= Alfonso Enríquez, Count of Gijón and Noreña =

Alfonso Enríquez (Gijón, 1355 – Marans or Portugal, c. 1400), Count of Noreña and of Gijón and lord of several places, was the eldest son of King Henry II of Castile and Elvira Íñiguez born before the king's marriage. (Note: Chronicler de Rades y Andrada in his Crónica de las tres Órdenes y Cauallerias de Sanctiago, Calatraua y Alcántara (Chronicle of the Three Military Orders of Santiago, Calatrava and Alcántara) calls her Inés Díaz de la Vega, daughter of Diego Lasso de la Vega and Elvira de Salcedo. In his last will, executed on 29 May 1374, King Henry calls her Elvira Íñiguez. She appears with this name on 22 February 1375 in a charter relating to a claim by "Elvira Íñiguez de la Vega, mother of Alfonso, Count of Gijón, bastard son of the king".) As one of the most powerful feudal lords in Asturias, where he owned many properties, he attempted to declare the independence of this region from his brother King John I and then from his nephew, King Henry III of Castile. He and his Portuguese wife, Isabel of Portugal, a natural daughter of King Ferdinand I, are the ancestors of the Noronha lineage in Portugal.

== Early years ==
Alfonso was raised close to his father during his youth. A year before his reign as king of Castile and León, Henry II gave Alfonso the lordship of Noreña and as such he appears confirming a charter in November 1368. He was knighted by his father in Santiago de Compostela in the spring of 1372 and it was probably at that time that he received the titles of Count of Noreña and of Gijón. (Note: According to the 18th century Portuguese genealogist António Caetano de Sousa, this was in 1373. Nevertheless, in a charter from the Monastery of San Vicente de Oviedo dated 1372, Alfonso was already signing as Count of Noreña.) He also received the properties that his father had inherited from his godfather and tutor, Rodrigo Álvarez, in León. In Asturias, these included the strategic counties of Noreña and Gijón plus Ribadesella, Villaviciosa, Nava, Laviana, Cudillero, Luarca, and Pravia. In León, he also owned the two Babias and Argüellos, both territories on the border with Asturias thanks to which he was able to move from one region to another without having to abandon his domains.

His first military experience was during the second Fernandine war in 1372 – 1373 where he succeeded in quashing the rebellions in Viana do Bolo and Cascais. The war came to an end with the signing of the Treaty of Santarém on 19 March 1373. One of the stipulations of the treaty was the marriage of Alfonso Enríquez with Isabel of Portugal, a natural daughter of King Ferdinand I, who at that time was about nine years old.

== Uprisings against his brother John I and nephew Henry III of Castile ==
Alfonso's father, King Henry II, died in May 1379 and was succeeded by his first-born son who reigned as John I of Castile. In the spring of 1381, King John I was preparing to go to war with Portugal. His half-brother, Alfonso Enríquez, knowing that all the soldiers from Asturias were away from the region, offered England, an ally of Portugal, the harbor of Gijón. Upon hearing this, King John I imprisoned his brother and confiscated his properties. Alfonso was only able to recover his territories in Asturias and León, including the County of Noreña, thanks to the intervention of the Bishop of Oviedo and after paying homage to his brother in Oviedo Cathedral.

The Count of Noreña, however, prepared a new uprising. His brother, King John, entrusted him with a diplomatic mission for negotiations with Portugal and, in early 1382, Alfonso, with his brother's permission, went to Braganza but, instead of defending Castile, he hid his intentions and tried to secure England's support for Portugal. The Castilian monarch in reprisal confiscated Alfonso's properties in Asturias and in the mountains of León.

In 1383, King John I discovered that his brother Alfonso had entered into new agreements with the King of Portugal. The king rushed to Asturias and subdued the entire region except for the port city of Gijón where his rebellious brother had sought refuge. At the end, the King forgave his brother on 18 July 1383 after having imprisoned him in La Puebla de Montalban under the custody of Pedro Tenorio, the archbishop of Toledo.

In September of that year, after the Courts of Segovia, the King donated all of Count Alfonso's properties in Asturias to Gutierre de Toledo, bishop of Oviedo, including the county of Noreña. As compensation, King John I granted Alfonso the title of Count of Valencia de Don Juan, a territory that was more accessible and controllable. The King also granted his son Henry the title of Prince of Asturias, with all the lordships thereby linking this difficult to reach territory — the ideal setting for conspiracies and uprisings due to its isolation and terrain — to the crown.

Shortly afterwards, following the death of King Ferdinand I in October 1383, King John I decided to imprison Alfonso in the castle of Almonacid since, having married a daughter of the deceased king, albeit illegitimate, Alfonso was a rival and could undermine his rights to the crown of Portugal as the husband of Beatrice, the late king's daughter with Leonor Teles. In July 1386, John I confiscated all of Alfonso's properties. His imprisonment lasted eight years and only after the death of King John I in 1390 was it possible for Alfonso to regain his freedom and his possessions.

During the reign of his nephew, Henry III of Castile, Alfonso continued to rebel against the crown. In 1394 the King laid siege to the city of Gijón. Isabel defended the city but finally surrendered. The King returned her son Henry who had been held hostage and ordered her to leave the kingdom and join her husband, Count Alfonso, who was in France at that time.

== Final years ==
Little is known about his final years except that he was made prisoner by order of the King in Saint-Jean-de-Luz but released shortly afterwards. It was rumored that in 1397 he was involved in a conspiracy with the King of Portugal against Henry III although this was never proven. He died around 1400 probably in Portugal or in Marans.

== Marriage and issue ==
His marriage with Isabel of Portugal was one of the stipulations of the Treaty of Santarém. Isabel, a natural daughter of King Ferdinand I, was about nine years in 1373 when the treaty was signed. The betrothal was celebrated a month later in Santarém. Unhappy with the arrangement, Alfonso fled to Avignon to try to convince Pope Gregory XI to intercede on his behalf and to cancel the wedding plans. He had to desist, however, when his father the king threatened to confiscate all his properties. The marriage finally took place in 1377. Although he obtained a divorce after his father's death, it was not effective since the marriage was consummated and the following children were born:

- Pedro de Noronha (1379 – 20 August 1452), Archbishop of Lisbon (1424 – 1452), father of João, Pedro and Fernando de Noronha;
- Fernando de Noronha, second count of Vila Real by his marriage to Beatrice de Meneses, second countess of Vila Real, daughter and heiress of Pedro de Menezes;
- Sancho de Noronha, first Count of Odemira, comendador mayor of the Order of Santiago, alcalde-mor of Estremoz and Elvas, Lord of Vimieiro, Mortágua, Aveiro and other territories, married to Mécia de Sousa;
- Henrique de Noronha, captain in Ceuta, without legitimate male issue;
- João de Noronha, participated in the siege of Balaguer and was knighted by Infante Duarte in the siege of Ceuta where he was injured. He died from his wounds shortly afterwards without having left any offspring;
- Constance of Noronha, the second wife of Afonso, Duke of Braganza, without issue.

From his affair with Inés de Soto de los Infantes of the Asturian lineage of the Miranda, he was the father of:

- Juana Enríquez, also known as Juana de Lodeña or Lidueña, abbess at the convent of Saint Clarie in Toledo. (Note: In 1489 the convent transferred to Diego de Miranda properties in Soto de los Infantes, Miranda, Salas, Grado, Navia, Cangas, Tineo, Allande and Babia, belonging to Juana. Author Margarita Cuartas Rivero quotes a document from the Archive of Valdecarzana dated 16 May 1489. Historian Balbina Martínez Caviró mistakenly asserted that Juana was the daughter of Alonso Enríquez and his wife Juana de Mendoza. Margarita Cuartas Rivero and J.A. González Calle, however, have proven that the abbess was, in fact, the daughter of the count of Noreña, a filiation also confirmed by historian Faustino Menéndez Pidal de Navascués who pointed out that the coat-of-arms engraved on Juana's tomb is identical to that of her father, Alfonso Enríquez, Count of Noreña.)

He was also the father of the following children out of wedlock:

- Juan Enríquez of Noreña, married to Beatrice, Lady of Mirabel.
- Beatrice of Noreña, the wife of Rui Vaz Pereira.
- Diego Enríquez of Noreña, married to Beatriz de Guzmán, the illegitimate daughter of Enrique Pérez de Guzmán, second Count of Niebla.

== Bibliography ==
- Blanco García, Flor (1971). "Catalogación de documentos medievales de La Rioja Burgalesa" (PDF). Boletín de la Institución Fernán González (in Spanish). No. 177. Burgos: Institución Fernán González. pp. 732–745. ISSN 0211-8998. Archived from the original (PDF) on 2014-10-16.
- Braamcamp Freire, Anselmo (1921). Livro primeiro dos Brasões de Sintra (in Portuguese). Coimbra: Imprenta da Universidade. OCLC 794223590.
- Carvallo, Luis Alfonso (1988) [1695]. Antiguedades y cosas memorables del Principado de Asturias (in Spanish). Gijón: Silverio Cañada. Bibliotéca Histórica Asturiana. ISBN 84-7286-263-1.
- Cuartas Rivero, Margarita (1983). Oviedo y el Principado de Asturias a fines de la edad media (in Spanish). Oviedo: Instituto de Estudios Asturianos (C.S.I.C.). ISBN 84-00-05447-4.
- Fernández Conde, F. Javier (1978). Gutierre de Toledo, obispo de Oviedo (1377-1389) (in Spanish). Oviedo: Universidad de Oviedo. Departamento de Historia Medieval. ISBN 84-7009-063-1.
- González Calle, Jesús Antonio (2011). "Mujeres en la nobleza bajomedieval asturiana: algunas biografías relevantes". Territorio, Sociedad y Poder:revista de estudios medievales (in Spanish). No. 6. Oviedo: Trea y Universidad de Oviedo: Servicio de Publicaciones. pp. 121–152. ISSN 1886-1121. Archived from the original on 2020-07-29.
- Lopes, Fernão (1895–1897). Chronica de el-rei D. Fernando (in Portuguese). 3 volumes. Lisbon: Escriptorio. Serie: Bibliotheca de classicos portugueses (VI). OCLC 2634915.
- Lopes, Fernão (1644). Chronica de el-rei D. Joam I de boa memoria (in Portuguese). Lisbon: António Álvarez Impressor delRey.
- López de Ayala, Pedro (1780). Crónicas de los reyes de Castilla D. Pedro I, D. Enrique II, D. Juan I, D. Enrique III (in Spanish). Vol. II. Con las enmiendas de Jerónimo Zurita y las correcciones y notas de Eugenio de Llaguno y Amírola. Madrid: Imprenta de Don Antonio de Sancha. OCLC 312539457.
- Martínez Caviró, Balbina (1980). Mudéjar toledano: palacios y conventos (in Spanish) (1st ed.). Madrid: Artes Gráficas VOCAL. ISBN 84-300-2910-9.
- Menéndez Pidal de Navascués, Faustino (1983). "De la famosa aventura heráldica de unos leones africanos y otras historias (Las armas del duque de Medina Sidonia, don Enrique)". Hidalguía: La revista de genealogía, nobleza y armas (in Spanish). No. 178–179. Madrid: Ediciones Hidalguía. pp. 305–317. ISSN 0018-1285.
- Menéndez Pidal de Navascués, Faustino (1982). Instituto Luis de Salazar y Castro (ed.). Heráldica medieval española: la Casa Real de León y Castilla (in Spanish). Vol. I. Madrid: Hidalguía. ISBN 8400051505.
- Rades y Andrada, Francisco (1572). Chronica de las Órdenes y Cavallerias de Santiago, Calatrava y Alcántara (in Spanish). Toledo: Casa de Juan de Ayala. OCLC 55249328.
- Rodrigues Oliveira, Ana (2010). Rainhas medievais de Portugal. Dezassete mulheres, duas dinastias, quatro séculos de História (in Portuguese). Lisbon: A esfera dos livros. ISBN 978-989-626-261-7.
- Rodríguez Díaz, Elena E. (1995). El Libro de la Regla Colorada de la Catedral de Oviedo. Estudio y edición (in Spanish). Oviedo: Real Instituto de Estudios Asturianos. ISBN 84-920049-1-6.
- Sousa, António Caetano de (1735). História Genealógica da Casa Real Portuguesa (PDF) (in Portuguese). Vol. I. Coimbra: Atlântida-Livraria Editora, Lda. OCLC 829426236.
- Sousa, António Caetano de (1755). Memorias Históricas e Genealógicas dos Grandes de Portugal (in Portuguese). Lisbon: Na Regia Officina Sylviana e da Academia Real. ISBN 9781010861676. OCLC 558039884.
- Uría Maqua, Juan (1975). "El conde don Alfonso" (PDF). Asturiensia medievalia (in Spanish). No. 2. Oviedo: Universidad de Oviedo, Departamento de Historia Medieval. pp. 177–238. ISSN 0301-889X.
- Uría Maqua, Juan (1978). "Las Rebeliones del conde don Alfonso en Asturias (1368-1396)". Historia General de Asturias (in Spanish). Vol. II. Gijón: Silverio Cañada. ISBN 8472860493.
- Uría Ríu, Juan (1951). "El matrimonio del conde D. Alfonso, bastardo de Enrique II y su anulación" (PDF). Archivum (in Spanish). No. 1. Oviedo: Universidad de Oviedo. Facultad de Filología. pp. 123–144. ISSN 0570-7218.
