= Church of the Lóios =

Coordinates: 38.5734815°N 7.9084775°W

- Convent of the Lóios
- Igreja dos Lóios
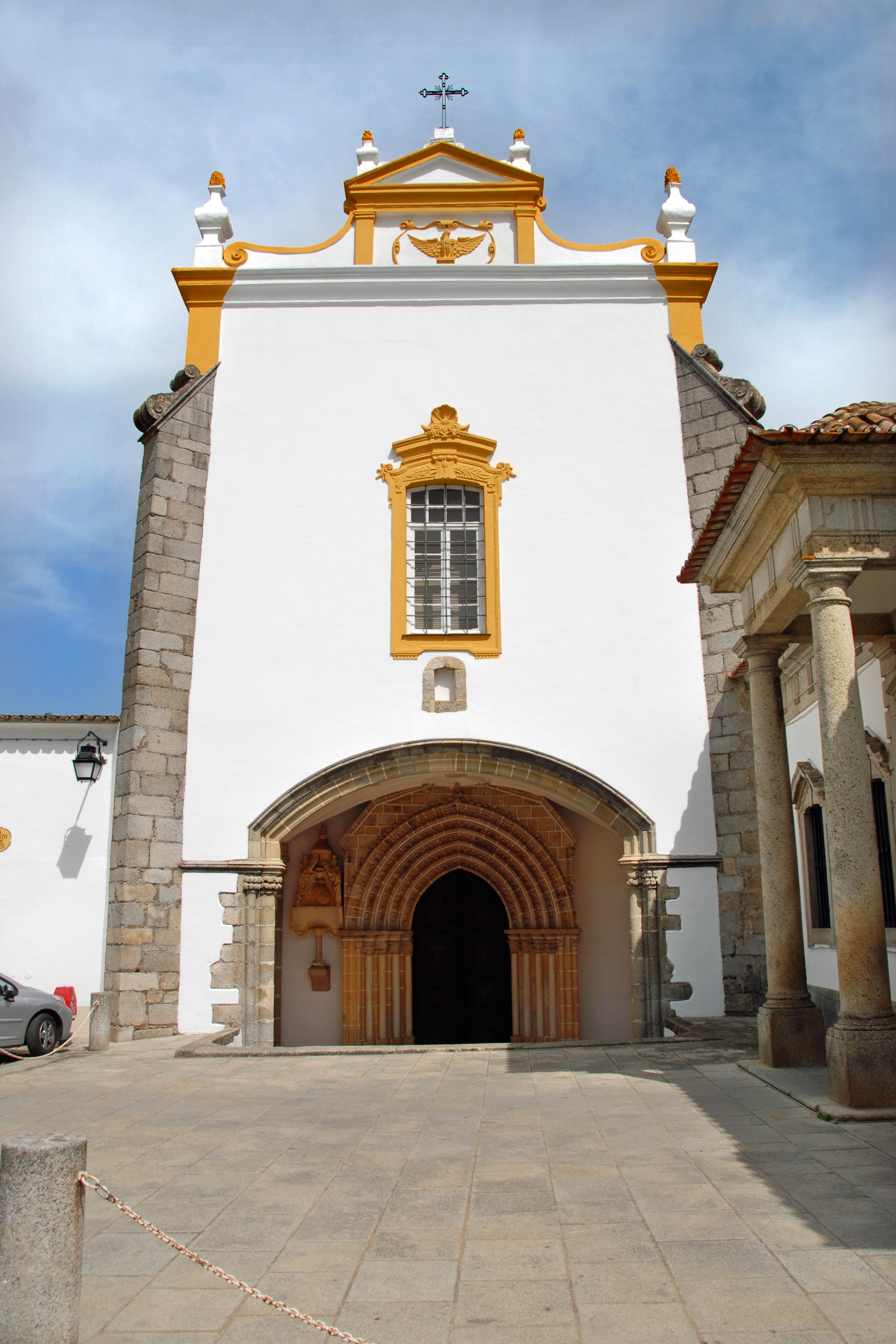
- The main facade and entrance to the Church of the Lóios
- Church of the Lóios
- Location: Évora, Alentejo Central, Alentejo
- Country: Portugal

Architecture
- Style: Gothic, Mannerism, Baroque

The Church of the Lóios (Portuguese: Igreja dos Lóios/Convento dos Lóios em Évora) is a 15th church civil parish of Évora (São Mamede, Sé, São Pedro e Santo Antão), municipality of Évora, in the Portuguese Alentejo.

== History ==
The church of São João Evangelista, annex to the Convent of the Lóios, was constructed through the initiative of the first Count of Olivença, D. Rodrigo Afonso de Melo. The church was founded in 1485 by D. Rodrigo, the squire to King D. Afonso V, who entrusted his coffin and the family pantheon to the friars of the congregation of Santo Elói, destined for his family (a branch of the Dukes of Cadaval). D. Rodrigo also left his lands in the medieval castle, for the construction of a monastery. The church was consecrated in 1491.

In addition to the tomb of D. Rodrigo de Sousa and his wife (in the presbytery), are the graves of his brother-in-law, D. Rui de Sousa (who was the chief-of-mission to the Congo in 1490 and ambassador of King D. João II to the Catholic Monarchs of Spain during the Treaty of Tordesilhas, in 1491) and D. Branca de Vilhena. The notable Flemish tombstones, in bronze, are actually in the Museum of the House of Cadaval. In the sacristy is a fresco from the early 15th century, attributed to José de Escobar, of calvary figures flanked by angels, revealed in a restoration intervention.

The sub-choir was constructed in the 16th century, resulting in the removal of the frontispiece. At the same time, the narthex was constructed to replace the primitive structure constructed in the 15th century. In 1630, the main altarpiece was constructed.

Between the 17th and 18th century the frontispiece and gable elevation were rebuilt. The lateral azulejo tiles were ordered by D. Nuno Álvares Pereira de Mello, descendant of the founder, and first Duke of Cadaval, from the Lisboeta master António de Oliveira Bernardes. The panels were date-marked 1711, and are one of the most monumental works of the artisan, with natural, expressive figures and large scenes.

In the beginning of the 18th century, the donatary tribune was installed in the nave.

As a consequence of the 1755 earthquake, much of the church was damaged, losing many of its original features.

On 13 September 2011 a declaration was issued to rectify the announcement 281/2011 on the public tender proposal for interventions in the public spaces in Évora to include several buildings and structures.

== Architecture ==
The church is situated on the clifftop escarpment known as Évora's acropolis (almost at the highest point), integrated into a complex of buildings that developed from the medieval castle, bordered by the Roman Temple of Évora.

It has a unique nave along a longitudinal plan, consisting of a polygonal apse and transept (though without the southern wing) covered in tile roofing. The principal facade includes three registers articulated vertically. On the first is the access to the narthex, through a Gothic portico with archivolts and flanked by imposing large columns with sculpted vegetal capitals. The archivolts are supported by columns of white marble with granite capitals, also with vegetal sculpted carvings, with the central archivolt supported by two thin colonnades. The outer doorway is framed by a small stone edicule over a broken-line, set on thin colonnades with similar vegetal capitals. The second register includes a decorated rectangular window and entablature.

The side wall of the Gospel is adorned by a commemoration of the feats of Dom Rodrigo de Melo in Tangier, in Ançã stone. It is constituted by a column with capital supporting a hexagonal base with two long-hair seraphs opening curtains to a tent, to show the heraldry of the Melos.

The lateral facades are defined by large buttresses, adorned by continuous three-lobed friezes that extend to the apse.

=== Interior ===
The large nave has five sections with ribbed ogival interior with heraldic buttons.

Formed of arches and of solid ribbed edges discharged into thin columns with vegetal capitals and abacuses in circular moldings. The first lower section of the entrance, includes the high choir and narthex, with lateral facades lined with historic tiles and large rectangular windows. Following this section is the triumphal arch which opens to the main chapel, through three archivolts with broken stone arch. The remainder of the two-story chapel is covered by three sections of the ogival ceiling with polychromatic ceramic panels of the life of São Lourenço Justiniano, covering the lateral walls to the gilded woodwork altarpiece with a tribune and pyramidal throne to expose the Blessed Sacrament.

The founder's pantheon is situated under the sub-choir, that includes numerous tombstones in white marble. At the front, near the Chapel of the Blessed Sacramento, are the tombs of D. Manuel de Melo and his son D. Francisco de Melo.

About half-way down the nave, on the right-side and second register is the tribune balustrade of the donation box, forming a wooden canopy supported by four pilasters. This canopy is highly decorated in gilded woodwork, that meets at the coat-of-arms of the Melo family. Farther along the opposite wall is a balustrade marble pulpit with radial petals base.

== Gallery ==
Nave looking toward the high altar

Nave looking toward the entrance and organ gallery

High altar and gilded retable

Azulejo panels surrounding the stone pulpit

Gilded projecting gallery and surrounding azulejo panels
