= Suo jure =

In their own right

Suo jure (suo iure) is a Latin phrase, used in English to mean 'in his own right' or 'in her own right'. In most nobility-related contexts, it means 'in her own right', since in those situations the phrase is normally used of women; in practice, especially in England, a man rarely derives any style or title from his wife (an example is Richard Neville, Earl of Warwick from his wife's heritage) although this is seen in other countries when a woman is the last heir of her line. It can be used for a male when such male was initially a 'co-lord' with his father or other family member and upon the death of such family member became the sole ruler or holder of the title "in his own right" (alone).

It is commonly encountered in the context of titles of nobility or honorary titles, e.g. Lady Mayoress, and especially in cases where a woman holds a title through her own bloodline or accomplishments rather than through her marriage.

An empress or queen who reigns suo jure is referred to as an "empress regnant" or "queen regnant", those terms often being contrasted with empress consort or queen consort. Meanwhile, "empress" and "queen" are often used alone to refer to either a regnant or consort, the distinction being indicated by context.

== Examples of suo jure titles ==
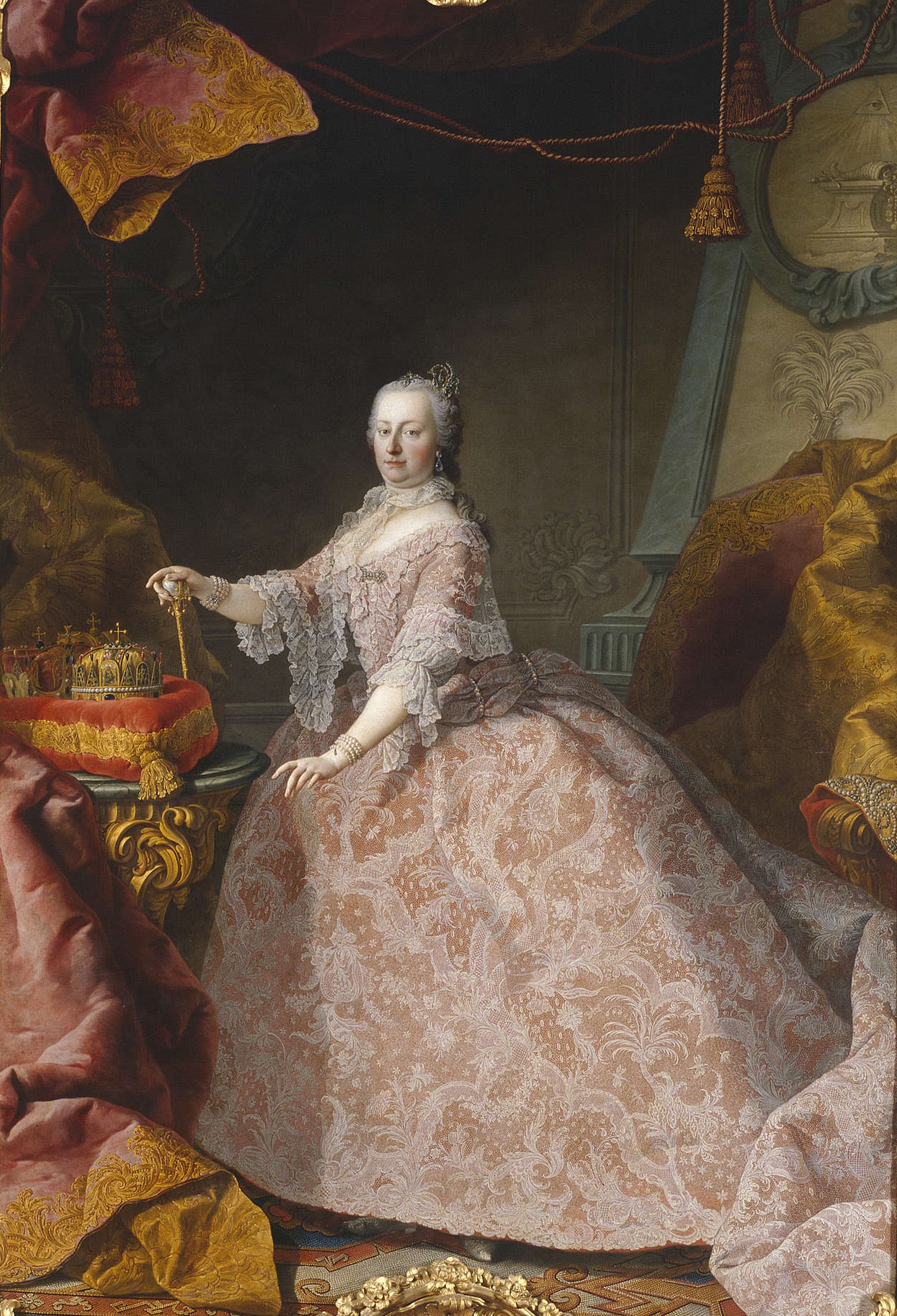
State portrait of Maria Theresa, which depicts her as the "first lady of Europe" in a precious dress of Brabant bobbin lace. To her right are Hungary's Crown of Saint Stephen, Bohemia's Crown of Saint Wenceslas and the Austrian Archducal hat as symbols of her suo jure reigns. The portrait is in the centre of the Hall of Ceremonies in Schönbrunn Palace (by Martin van Meytens, c. 1752)

- Ela of Salisbury, 3rd Countess of Salisbury – countess suo jure
- Anne of Austria, Landgravine of Thuringia – Duchess of Luxembourg suo jure
- Marjorie, Countess of Carrick – countess suo jure
- Matilda, Margrave of Tuscany – Italian, Imperial Vicar and Vice-Queen of Italy suo jure, Margrave suo jure
- Eleanor, Duchess of Aquitaine – French, then English queen consort, duchess suo jure
- Mary, Duchess of Burgundy – Queen consort of the Romans, duchess suo jure
- Anne Marie Louise d'Orléans, Duchess of Montpensier – French princess, peeress suo jure
- Hawise, Duchess of Brittany – duchess suo jure
- Henrietta Godolphin, 2nd Duchess of Marlborough – English peeress suo jure
- Maria Theresa of Austria – Archduchess of Austria, Queen of Bohemia and Queen of Hungary suo jure and Holy Roman Empress as a wife of Francis I
- Elizabeth of Russia – Russian empress regnant
- Princess Wilhelmine, Duchess of Sagan – Princess of Courland, duchess suo jure
- Princess Alexandra, 2nd Duchess of Fife – British princess, duchess suo jure
- Cayetana Fitz-James Stuart, 18th Duchess of Alba – Spanish grandee suo jure
- Patricia Mountbatten, 2nd Countess Mountbatten of Burma – British countess suo jure
- Jane Heathcote-Drummond-Willoughby, 28th Baroness Willoughby de Eresby – British baroness suo jure
- Rosalinda Álvares Pereira de Melo, 1st Duchess of Cadaval-Hermès – Portuguese duchess suo jure
- Diana Álvares Pereira de Melo, 11th Duchess of Cadaval – half-sister of the above, Portuguese duchess ad personam and suo jure
- Jeanne d'Albret – queen regnant of Navarre
- Margaret of Mar, 31st Countess of Mar – Scottish peeress suo jure
- Anne Hamilton, 3rd Duchess of Hamilton – Scottish duchess suo jure
- Catherine Willoughby, 12th Baroness Willoughby de Eresby – English baroness suo jure
- Joan of Kent – suo jure 4th Countess of Kent and 5th Baroness Wake of Liddell
- Queen Anne Boleyn of England – Marquess of Pembroke suo jure
- Elizabeth II, suo jure Queen of the United Kingdom of Great Britain and Northern Ireland and several other Commonwealth realms
- Catharina-Amalia, Princess of Orange became, in 2013, the first suo jure Hereditary Princess of Orange since Mary of Baux in 1417
- Princess Elisabeth, Duchess of Brabant became, in 2013, the first-ever suo jure Hereditary Duchess of Brabant
- Princess Leonor of Spain – Princess of Asturias suo jure
- Claude, Queen Consort of France – French princess, Hereditary Duchess of Brittany suo jure
- Ada, Countess of Atholl – countess suo jure
- Augusto Pinochet – senator-for-life suo jure, from 1998 to abolishment in 2002

== See also ==
- List of peerages created for women in the peerages of the British Isles
- List of peerages inherited by women in the peerages of the British Isles
- Jure uxoris
- List of Latin phrases
