= Jaime Álvares Pereira de Melo, 3rd Duke of Cadaval =

Jaime Álvares Pereira de Melo
- Duke of Cadaval
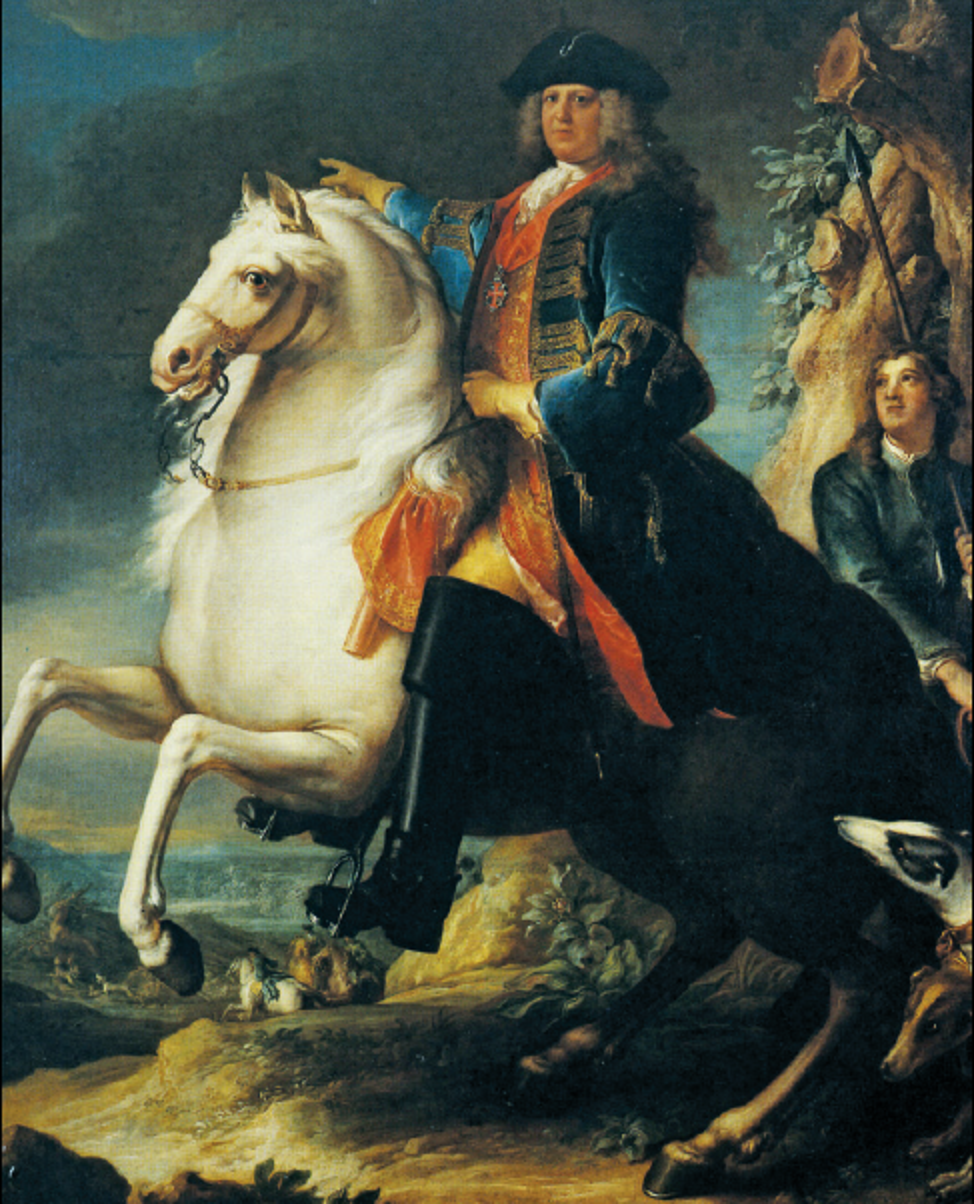
- Equestrian Portrait of the Duke of Cadaval; Pierre-Antoine Quillard, c. 1728-1730.
- Born: 1 September 1684
- Died: 29 May 1749 (aged 64)
- Spouse: Luísa of Braganza; Henriette Julienne de Lorraine
- Issue: Nuno, Duke of Cadaval; Joana; Margarida, Marquise of Marialva; Luísa, Countess of São Vicente
- Religion: Roman Catholicism

D. Jaime Álvares Pereira de Melo (1 September 1684 — 29 May 1749), 3rd Duke of Cadaval, 5th Marquis of Ferreira, and 6th Count of Tentúgal, was a Portuguese nobleman and statesman.

== Career ==
Dom Jaime Álvares Pereira de Melo, 3rd Duke of Cadaval, was the third son of Dom Nuno Álvares Pereira de Melo, 1st Duke of Cadaval, 4th Marquess of Ferreira and 5th Count of Tentúgal, and his third wife Princess Marguerite of Lorraine-Armagnac.

The Duke was High-Equerry of the Royal Household of Pedro II of Portugal and subsequently that of João V of Portugal. In 1713, he became a Counselor of State and War.

== Family ==
Jaime married twice, first to his dead brother's widow, Luísa of Braganza, natural daughter of King Peter II of Portugal, with whom he had no children, and then to Henriette Julienne Gabrielle de Lorraine, daughter of Louis de Lorraine, Prince of Lambesc, with whom he had four children, three surviving to adulthood:

- Nuno (1741–1771), 4th Duke of Cadaval, 6th Marquis of Ferreira, 7th Count of Tentúgal, who married D. Maria Leonor da Cunha e Távora, daughter of D. Miguel Carlos da Cunha Silveira e Távora, 5th Count of São Vicente.
- Joana, died in infancy.
- Margarida, married Diogo José Vito de Meneses Noronha Coutinho, 5th Marquis of Marialva, 7th Count of Cantanhede.
- Luísa, married Manuel Carlos da Cunha e Távora, 6th Count of São Vicente.

== Ancestry ==
Ancestors of Jaime Álvares Pereira de Melo, 3rd Duke of Cadaval

16. Francisco de Melo, 2nd Marquis of Ferreira and 2nd Count of Tentúgal
8. Nuno Álvares Pereira de Melo, 3rd Count of Tentúgal
17. Eugenia de Bragança (daughter of Jaime I of Braganza, 4th Duke of Braganza)
4. Francisco de Melo, 3rd Marquis of Ferreira and 4th Count of Tentúgal
18. Rodrigo de Moscoso Osorio y Álvarez de Toledo, 5th Count of Altamira
9. Mariana de Moscoso Osorio
19. Isabel de Castro
2. Nuno Álvares Pereira de Melo, 1st Duke of Cadaval
20. Enríque de Pimentel y Enríquez, 3rd Marquis of Távara
10. Antonio de Pimentel y Álvarez de Toledo, 4th Marquis of Távara
21. Juana Álvarez de Toledo
5. Juana de Pimentel
22. Lope de Moscoso Osorio, 6th Count of Altamira (son of 18 and 19)
11. Isabel de Moscoso
23. Leonor de Sandoval y Rojas
1. Jaime Álvares Pereira de Melo, 3rd Duke of Cadaval
24. Charles I de Lorraine-Guise, Duke d'Elbeuf
12. Henri de Lorraine, Count d'Harcourt
25. Marguerite de Chabot
6. Louis de Lorraine, Count d'Armagnac
26. Charles du Cambout, Marquis de Coislin
13. Marguerite-Philippe du Cambout
27. Philippe de Beurges
3. Marguerite of Lorraine
28. Charles de Neufville, Marquis de Villeroy
14. Nicolas de Neufville, Duke of Villeroy
29. Jacqueline de Harlay de Sancy
7. Catherine de Neufville
30. Charles de Blanchefort de Créquy, Duke de Créquy, Prince de Poix
15. Marie de Créquy, Dame de Mions
31. Madeleine de Bonne de Lesdiguières
