= Nuno Álvares Pereira de Melo, 1st Duke of Cadaval =

Nuno Álvares Pereira de Melo
- Duke of Cadaval; Marquis of Ferreira; Count of Tentúgal
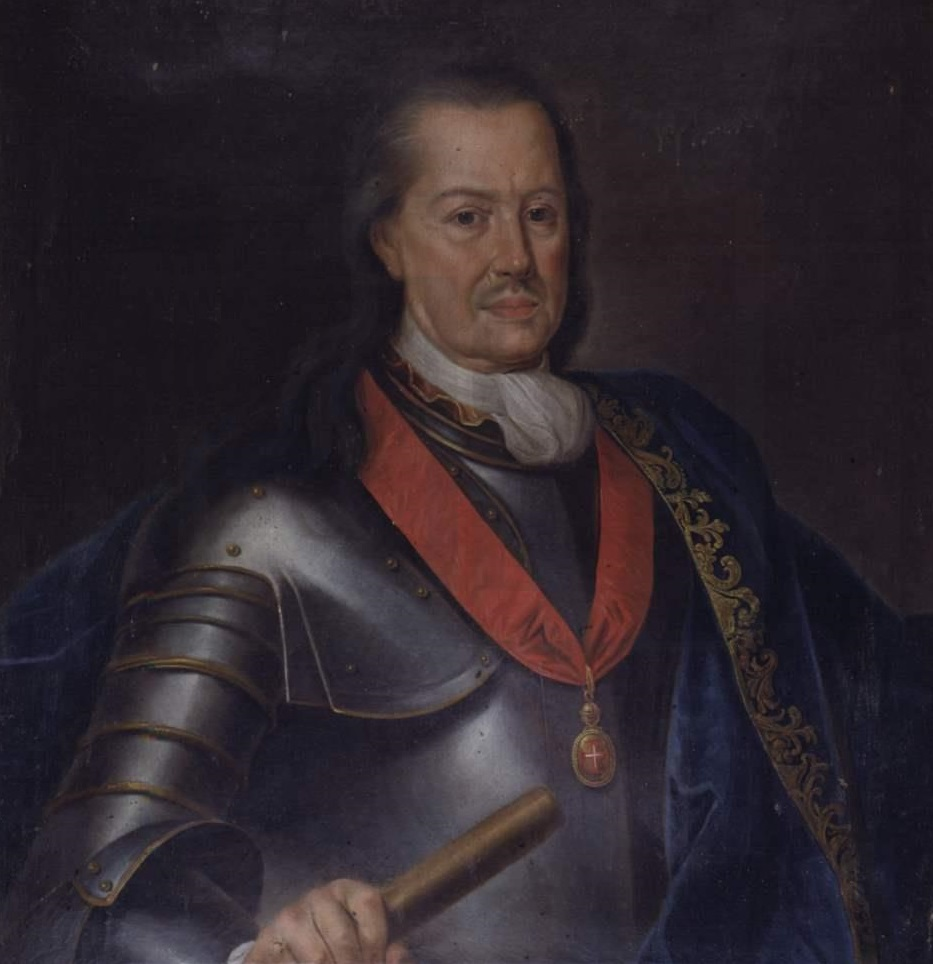
- Born: 4 November 1638
- Died: 29 January 1725 (aged 86)
- Spouse: Maria de Faro; Angélique of Lorraine-Harcourt; Marguerite of Lorraine-Armagnac
- Father: Francisco de Melo, 3.º marquês de Ferreira
- Mother: Joana Pimentel

Nuno Álvares Pereira de Melo, 1st Duke of Cadaval, 4th Marquis of Ferreira, 5th Count of Tentúgal (4 November 1638 – 29 January 1725), was a Portuguese nobleman and statesman.

== Biography ==
Nuno was a general in the Portuguese Restoration War, which earned him prestige and achieved himself the title of Duke of Cadaval. Following the end of the war, he was made Constable of Portugal in the Portuguese Cortes of 1668.

In June 1670, Nuno became a member of the Ultramarine Council, an administrative organ of the Portuguese Empire.

In 1707, the Duke was made chief of the Portuguese army.

== Personal life ==
He first married in 1660 Maria de Faro (1635-1661), daughter of Francisco de Faro, 7th Count of Odemira.
They had 3 children who all died young.

His second wife was Princess Marie Angélique of Lorraine-Harcourt (1646-1674), daughter of François Louis, Count of Harcourt. They had 2 children :

- Isabel Henriqueta de Lorena (1672-1699). She married in 1690 Rodrigo Anes de Sá Almeida e Meneses, 1st Marquis of Abrantes
- Francisco (1674-1674)

His third marriage was to Princess Marguerite of Lorraine-Armagnac (17 November 1662 – 16 December 1730), daughter of Louis, Count of Armagnac. They had 10 children :

- Francisco (1677–1678);
- Catarina (born and died in 1678);
- Luís Ambrósio de Melo (1679–1700), 2nd Duke of Cadaval. Died during his father's lifetime, without issue
- Ana de Lorena (1681–1721), married in 1695 to Luís Bernardo de Távora, 5th Count of São João da Pesqueira. They were the parents of Leonor Tomásia de Távora, 3rd Marquise of Távora.
- Eugênia Rosa de Lorena (1683–1724); married in 1698 to Manuel Teles da Silva (1682–1736), 4th Count of Vilar Maior.
- Jaime de Melo (1684–1749), 3rd Duke of Cadaval, 5th Marquess of Ferreira, 6th Count of Tentúgal.
- Álvaro (1685–1701)
- Joana de Lorena (1687–1740), married in 1699 to Bernardo António Filipe Neri de Távora, 2nd Count of Alvor.
- Rodrigo de Melo (1688–1713), Marquess of Cadaval. He married Ana Maria de Lorena, 1st Duchess of Abrantes.
- Filipa Angelina de Lorena (1694–1713), married in 1711 Joaquim Francisco de Sá Almeida e Menezes, 2nd Marquis of Abrantes.

== Ancestry ==
Ancestors of Nuno Álvares Pereira de Melo, 1st Duke of Cadaval

16. Rodrigo de Melo, 1st Marquis of Ferreira and 1st Count of Tentúgal
8. Francisco de Melo, 2nd Marquis of Ferreira and 2nd Count of Tentúgal
17. Leonor de Almeida
4. Nuno Álvares Pereira de Melo, 3rd Count of Tentúgal
18. Jaime I of Braganza, 4th Duke of Braganza
9. Eugénia de Bragança
19. Joana de Mendoça
2. Francisco de Melo, 3rd Marquis of Ferreira and 4th Count of Tentúgal
20. Álvaro Lope de Moscoso Osorio y Andrade, 4th Count of Altamira
10. Rodrigo de Moscoso Osorio y Álvarez de Toledo, 5th Count of Altamira
21. Ana Álvarez de Toledo
5. Mariana de Moscoso
22. Fernando Ruiz de Castro Osorio y Portugal, 4th Count of Lemos
11. Isabel de Castro Osorio y Portugal
23. Teresa de Andrade, 4th Countess of Villalba
1. Nuno Álvares Pereira de Melo, 1st Duke of Cadaval
24. Pedro de Pimentel y Osorio, 2nd Marquis of Távara
12. Enríque Bernardino de Pimentel y Enríquez, 3rd Marquis of Távara
25. Leonor Enríquez
6. Antonio de Pimentel y Álvarez de Toledo, 4th Marquis of Távara
26. García Álvarez de Toledo, 4th Marquis of Villafranca
13. Juana Álvarez de Toledo
27. Donna Vittoria Colonna
3. Juana de Pimentel
28. Rodrigo de Moscoso Osorio y Álvarez de Toledo, 5th Count of Altamira (=10)
14. Lope de Moscoso Osorio, 6th Count of Altamira
29. Isabel de Castro Osorio y Portugal (=11)
7. Isabel de Moscoso
30. Francisco Gómez de Sandoval y Zúñiga, 4th Marquis of Denia
15. Leonor de Sandoval y Rojas
31. Isabel de Borja y Castro (daughter of Francis Borgia, 4th Duke of Gandía)
