= Constable of Portugal =

Defunct office created by King Ferdinand I of Portugal

Constable of Portugal (Portuguese: Condestável de Portugal) was an office created by King Ferdinand I of Portugal in 1382, to replace the High Standard-bearer (Alferes-Mor) as the head of the Portuguese Military. It was also referred as the Constable of the Kingdom (Condestável do Reino).

The Constable was the second most powerful person in the Kingdom, after the King of Portugal. The Constable's responsibility was to command the military in the absence of the King and to maintain discipline in the army; he was present at all military tribunals.

After the reign of John IV of Portugal (1640–1656), the title ceased to have military or administrative responsibilities, becoming an honorific title.

== List of Constables of Portugal ==
1. Álvaro Pires de Castro, 1st Count of Arraiolos and 1st Count of Viana (da Foz do Lima) (brother of Inês de Castro) (1310–1384)
2. Nuno Álvares Pereira, the Saint Constable, 38th Lord Chamberlain (Mordomo-Mor) of Portugal (to King John I), 2nd Count of Arraiolos, 3rd Count of Ourém and 7th Count of Barcelos (1360–1431)
3. João of Portugal, Infante of Portugal and Lord of Reguengos, Colares and Belas (1400–1442)
4. Diogo of Portugal, son of the former, Infante of Portugal (1425–1443)
5. Pedro of Portugal, King of Aragon and Count of Barcelona, Grand Master of the Order of Aviz (1429–1466)
6. Fernando, 2nd Duke of Viseu, Infante of Portugal (1433–1470)
7. John, Marquis of Montemor-o-Novo, son of Fernando I, Duke of Braganza (n.1430)
8. Afonso of Viseu, grandson of Fernando, Duke of Viseu (1480–1504)
9. Luís, 5th Duke of Beja, Infante of Portugal (1506–1555)
10. Duarte II, 5th Duke of Guimarães, grandson of King Manuel I of Portugal (1541–1576)
11. John, 6th Duke of Braganza (1543–1583)
12. Fernando Álvarez de Toledo, 3rd Duke of Alba (1581–1582)
13. Teodósio II, 7th Duke of Braganza (1582–1630)
14. João IV, King of Portugal (1604–1656)
15. Francisco de Melo, 5th Marquis of Ferreira, 4th Count of Tentúgal (1588–1645)
16. Pedro of Braganza, Duke of Beja (later King of Portugal) (1648–1706)
17. Nuno Álvares Pereira de Melo, 1st Duke of Cadaval, 4th Marquis of Ferreira, 5th Count of Tentúgal (1638–1727)
18. Francisco, 7th Duke of Beja, Infante of Portugal (1691–1742)
19. João VI, King of Portugal (1767–1826)
20. Miguel, King of Portugal (1802–1866)
21. Nuno Caetano Álvares Pereira de Melo, 6th Duke of Cadaval, 8th Marquis of Ferreira, 9th Count of Tentúgal (1799–1837)
22. António de Vasconcelos e Sousa Câmara Caminha Faro e Veiga, 8th Count of Calheta, 4th Marquis of Castelo Melhor (1816–1858)
23. Luís I, King of Portugal (1838–1889)
24. João, 8th Duke of Beja, Infante of Portugal (1842–1861)
25. Afonso, Duke of Porto, Infante of Portugal (1865–1920)

== See also ==
- Marshal of Portugal
- Constable
- The Constable of France
- The Lord High Constable of England
- The Lord High Constable of Scotland
