= Count of Odemira =

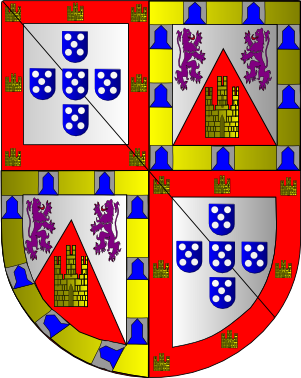
Coat of Arms of Sancho of Noronha, 1st Count of Odemira.

Count of Odemira (in Portuguese Conde de Odemira) was a Portuguese title of nobility granted to D. Sancho de Noronha by royal decree issued on 9 October 1446, by King Afonso V of Portugal.

Sancho de Noronha was the third son of Alfonso, Count of Gijón and Noroña (natural son of King Henry II of Castile) and of his wife Isabel of Portugal (natural daughter of King Fernando I of Portugal).

== List of title-holders ==
1. Sancho de Noronha (c.1390- ? );
2. Maria de Noronha, his daughter, married to Afonso, 1st Count of Faro;
3. Sancho de Noronha (c.1470- ? ), their eldest son;
4. Sancho de Noronha (c.1515-1573), his grandson;
5. Afonso de Noronha (c.1535-1578), his son, died in the battle of Alcácer Quibir;
6. Sancho de Noronha (1579–1641);
7. Francisco de Faro (c.1575- ? ) a distant cousin from a collateral branch;
8. Maria de Faro (c.1610-1664), married to Nuno Álvares Pereira de Melo, 1st Duke of Cadaval;
9. Joana de Faro (1661–1669), last countess of Odemira and countess of Tentúgal (as heir of the Duke of Cadaval).

== See also ==
- Count of Faro
- List of countships in Portugal

== Bibliography ==
"Nobreza de Portugal e Brasil" Vol III, pages 65/68. Published by Zairol, Lda., Lisbon, 1989.
