= Pierre-Antoine Quillard =

French painter

- Born: c. 1700; Paris, France
- Died: 25 November 1733 (aged 33); Lisbon, Portugal
- Education: School of Antoine Watteau
- Movement: Rococo
- Patrons: Louis XV of France, Joseph I of Portugal, John V of Portugal, Gabriel of Lencastre, 7th Duke of Aveiro, Manuel Teles da Silva, 3rd Marquis of Alegrete

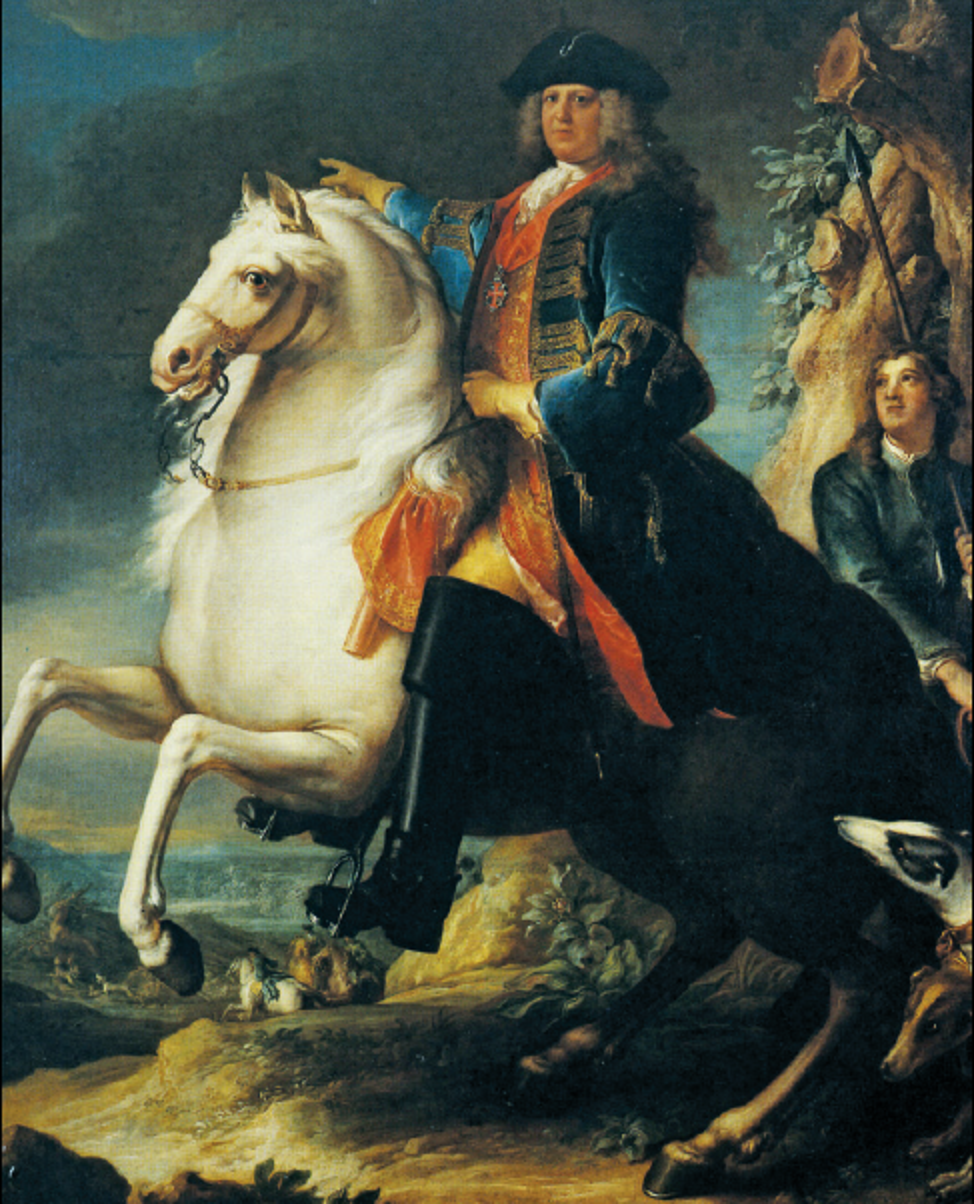
Portrait of the Duke of Cadaval (1728, attributed)

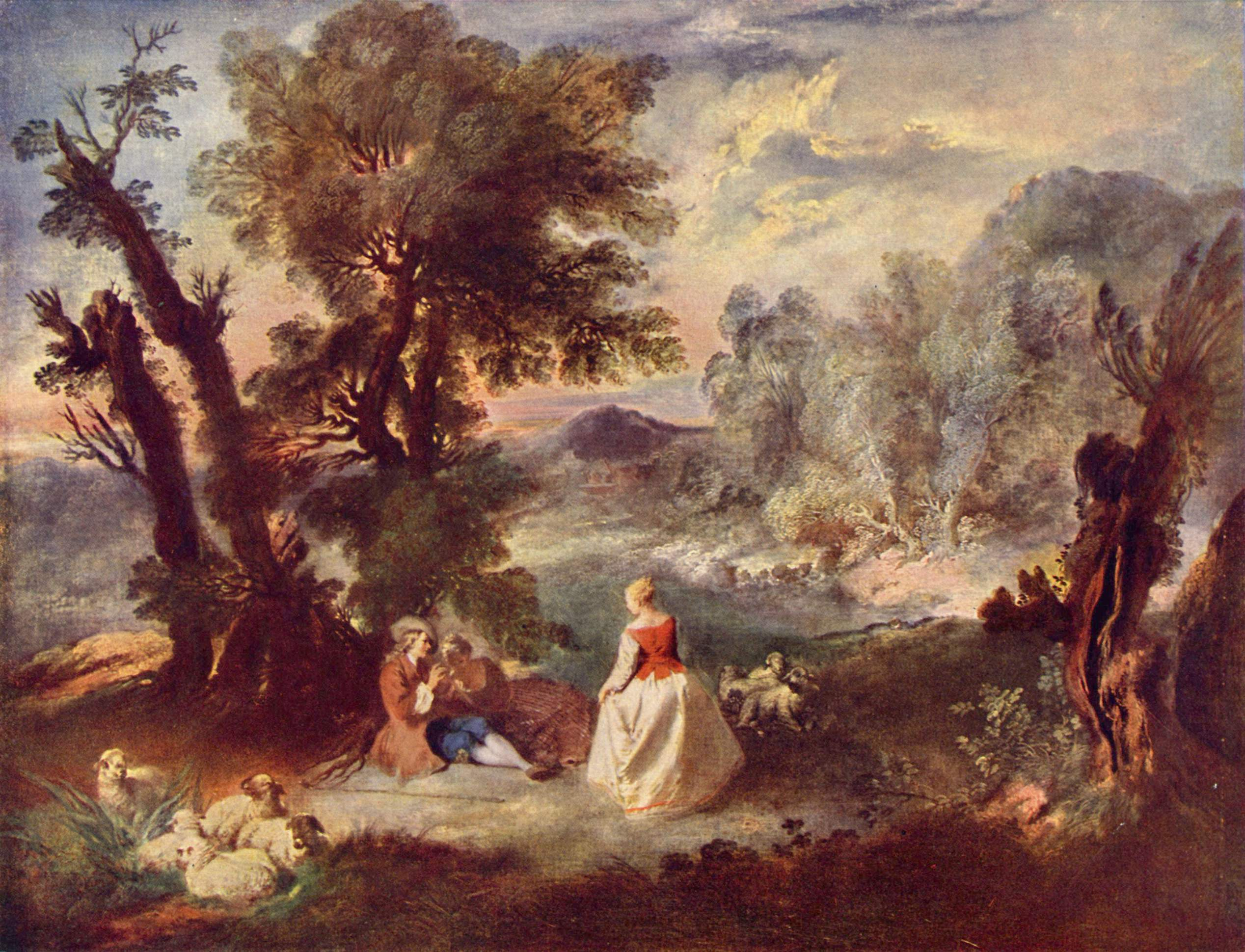
Pastorale (c. 1730)

Pierre-Antoine Quillard, ([pjɛʁ.ɑ̃.twan ki.jaʁ]; c. 1700 – 25 November 1733) was a French portrait painter and engraver who worked in Portugal.

== Biography ==
Quillard's father was a woodworker. He began to study art at a very early age, possibly with Antoine Watteau, or at least some of his close associates. When he was ten or eleven, his paintings were deemed such perfect copies of Watteau's style that Cardinal Fleury presented some to King Louis XV, who granted Quillard a pension.

After twice failing to win the Prix de Rome, in 1724 and 1725, and despite having won second place both times, he accepted an offer of work from Charles Frédéric de Merveilleux (d. 1749), a Swiss doctor who was attached to the Royal Court in Lisbon. The position involved drawing illustrations to accompany a herbarium the doctor was preparing. Upon Quillard's arrival, Crown Prince (later King) Joseph awarded him a pension of 80 cruzados per month.

After spending some time working on Merveilleux's Flora, he was able to obtain an appointment as court painter to King John V in 1727. His first assignment was to decorate the ceilings in Queen Maria Anna's apartments. As it turned out, those paintings had a short life, being destroyed in the Lisbon earthquake of 1755. Together with several other French and Flemish artists, he was commissioned to illustrate publications issued by the Academia Portuguesa de História, which had been founded in 1721.

He worked for the Marquis of Alegrete and the Count of Ericeira and produced decorations for the palace of the Duke of Cadaval. Shortly before his death, at the request of the Duke of Aveiro, he produced twelve screens for the Cathedral of Aveiro, a former Dominican convent.

Because of the huge demand for paintings in Watteau's style that arose after his death in 1721, very few works have been positively identified as Quillard's and a catalogue raisonné has yet to be created.
