= Isabel of Portugal, Lady of Viseu =

Natural daughter of Ferdinand I (1364–1435)

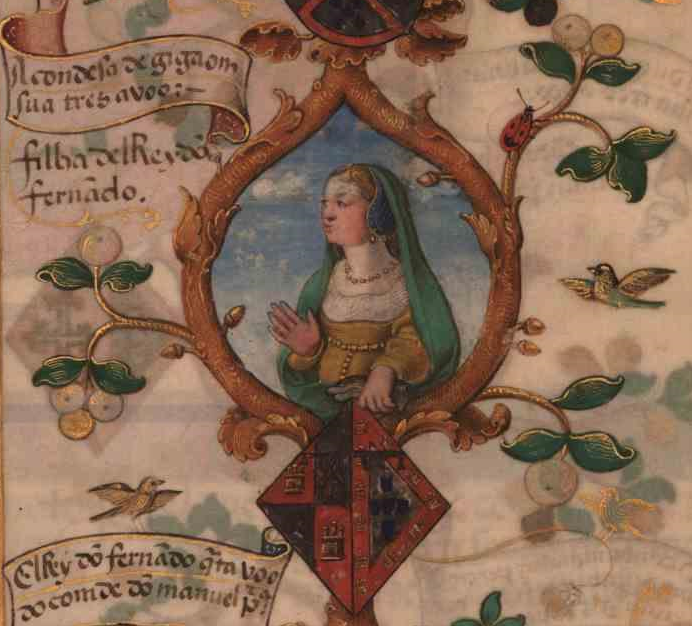
Isabella of Portugal in the Genealogy of Manuel Pereira, 3rd Count of Feira (1534)

Isabella of Portugal (c. 1364– Marans, 4 April 1435) was the natural daughter of King Ferdinand I of Portugal, from an unknown mother. Though, it was rumored at the time that her mother was none other than the king's half-sister, Beatrice, Countess of Albuquerque, with whom he was said to have had an incestuous relationship according to the chronicler Fernão Lopes.

== Biography ==
Before 1373 she was betrothed to João Afonso Telo de Menezes, 1st Count of Viana (do Alentejo), son of the powerful João Afonso Telo, 4th Count of Barcelos. However, this project was abandoned or dissolved.

She married Alfonso Enríquez, Count of Gijón and Noreña, natural son of King Henry II of Castile. Her marriage was one of the clauses of the Treaty of Santarém, signed in 1373, between Portugal and Castile.

Through a royal letter issued on 2 October 1377, her father granted her the Lordship of Viseu, Celorico, Linhares and Algodres.

She left to the Royal Court of King Henry II of Castile where she lived while waiting for an appropriate age to get married. They finally married in November 1377 in the city of Burgos. This marriage gave rise to the Noronha family, still represented in several aristocratic houses, both in Portugal and in Spain.

The couple had six children:

- Pedro de Noronha (1379 – 20 August 1452), Archbishop of Lisbon (1424 – 1452), father of João, Pedro and Fernando de Noronha;
- Fernando de Noronha, second count of Vila Real by his marriage to Beatrice de Meneses, second countess of Vila Real, daughter and heiress of Pedro de Menezes;
- Sancho de Noronha, first Count of Odemira, comendador mayor of the Order of Santiago, alcalde-mor of Estremoz and Elvas, Lord of Vimieiro, Mortágua, Aveiro and other territories, married to Mécia de Sousa. He is the ancestor of Queen Luisa de Guzmán;
- Henrique de Noronha, captain in Ceuta, without legitimate male issue;
- João de Noronha, participated in the siege of Balaguer and was knighted by Infante Duarte in the siege of Ceuta where he was injured. He died from his wounds shortly afterwards without having left any offspring.
- Constance of Noronha, the second wife of Afonso, Duke of Braganza, without issue.

Isabella eventually returned to her native Portugal where her uncle, King John I of Portugal, gave her a warm welcome and protection, both to her and to her children.

== See also ==
- Noronha
- Noreña

== Bibliography ==
- Braamcamp Freire, Anselmo (1921). Livro primeiro dos Brasões de Sintra (in Portuguese). Coimbra: Imprenta da Universidade. OCLC 794223590.
- Menéndez Pidal de Navascués, Faustino (1982). Instituto Luis de Salazar y Castro (ed.). Heráldica medieval española: la Casa Real de León y Castilla (in Spanish). Vol. I. Madrid: Hidalguía. ISBN 8400051505.
- Sousa, António Caetano de (1946). História Genealógica da Casa Real Portuguesa (in Portuguese). Vol. I. Coimbra: Atlântida-Livraria Editora, Lda. OCLC 829426236.
- "Nobreza de Portugal e Brasil" – Vol. II, pages 234/235. Published by Zairol Lda., Lisbon 1989.
- González Calle, Jesús Antonio (2011). "Mujeres en la nobleza bajomedieval asturiana: algunas biografías relevantes". Oviedo: Trea y Universidad de Oviedo: Servicio de Publicaciones. pp. 121–152. Archived from the original on 2020-07-29.
