= Count of Tentúgal =

Portuguese title of nobility, established in 1504

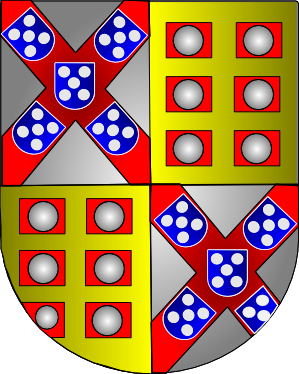
Coat of Arms of Rodrigo de Melo, 1st Count of Tentúgal and 1st Marquis of Ferreira, mixing the Braganzas coat of arms with the Melo family's.

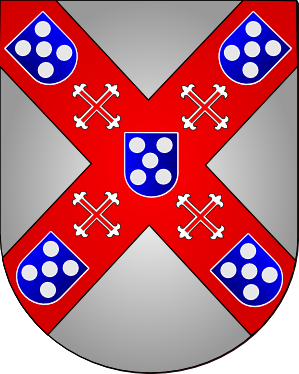
The Coat of Arms of the Dukes of Cadaval, Marquesses of Ferreira and Counts of Tentúgal.

Count of Tentúgal (in Portuguese Conde de Tentúgal) was a Portuguese title of nobility created by a royal decree, dated from 1 January 1504, by King Manuel I of Portugal, and granted to Dom Rodrigo de Melo, son of Álvaro of Braganza and Philippa of Melo (daughter and heir of the Count of Olivença).

Twenty nine years later, in 1533, King John III of Portugal granted him the new title of Marquis of Ferreira (in Portuguese Marquês de Ferreira). Count of Tentúgal became the title used by the Marquis's heir.

Finally, and following the expulsion of the Philippine Dynasty from the throne of Portugal (1640), the new King John IV of Portugal granted to 5th Count of Tentúgal and 4th Marquis of Ferreira, Dom Nuno Álvares Pereira de Melo, the new title of Duke of Cadaval (in Portuguese Duque de Cadaval) by a royal decree dated from 26 April 1648.

Marquis of Ferreira and Count of Tentúgal became subsidiary titles from the Duke of Cadaval, used by the Duke's heir, during his father's life.

== List of counts of Tentúgal (1504) and Marquises of Ferreira (1533) ==
Álvaro de Bragança, 4th Lord of Cadaval and 1st Lord of Tentúgal ⚭ Filipa de Melo, 5th Lady of Ferreira;

- Rodrigo de Melo (1468–1545), 1st Count of Tentúgal and 1st Marquis of Ferreira, who married Leonor de Almeida, daughter of Francisco de Almeida, 1st Viceroy of India;
- Francisco de Melo (1520–1588), 2nd Count of Tentúgal and 2nd Marquis of Ferreira;
- Nuno Álvares Pereira de Melo (1555–1597), 3rd Count of Tentúgal;
- Francisco de Melo (1588–1645), 4th Count of Tentúgal and 3rd Marquis of Ferreira;
- Nuno Álvares Pereira de Melo (1638–1727), 5th Count of Tentúgal, 4th Marquis of Ferreira and 1st Duke of Cadaval;
- Luis Ambrósio de Melo (1679–1700), 2nd Duke of Cadaval;
- Jaime Álvares Pereira de Melo (1684–1749), 6th Count of Tentúgal, 5th Marquis of Ferreira and 3rd Duke of Cadaval;
- Nuno Caetano Álvares Pereira de Melo (1741–1771), 7th Count of Tentúgal, 6th Marquis of Ferreira and 4th Duke of Cadaval;
- Miguel Caetano Álvares Pereira de Melo (1765–1808), 8th Count of Tentúgal, 7th Marquis of Ferreira and 5th Duke of Cadaval;
- Nuno Caetano Álvares Pereira de Melo (1799–1837), 9th Count of Tentúgal, 8th Marquis of Ferreira and 6th Duke of Cadaval;
- Maria da Piedade Caetano Álvares Pereira Melo (1827–1898), 10th Countess of Tentúgal, 9th Marquise of Ferreira and 7th Duchess of Cadaval;
- Jaime Caetano Álvares Pereira de Melo (1844–1913), 11th Count of Tentúgal, 10th Marquis of Ferreira and 8th Duke of Cadaval;
- Nuno Maria José Caetano Álvares Pereira de Melo (1888–1935), 12th Count of Tentúgal, 11th Marquis of Ferreira and 9th Duke of Cadaval;
- Jaime Álvares Pereira de Melo (1913–2001), 13th Count of Tentúgal, 12th Marquis of Ferreira and 10th Duke of Cadaval;
- Rosalinda Aurora Felicidade Álvares Pereira de Melo (born 1936), 14th Countess of Tentúgal, 13th Marquise of Ferreira and 1st Duchess of Cadaval-Guerrand-Hermès;
- Olympia Álvares Pereira de Melo Guerrand-Hermés (born 1977), 15th Countes of Tentúgal.

== See also ==
- Duke of Cadaval
- Dukedoms in Portugal
- List of marquisates in Portugal
- List of countships in Portugal
