= Count of Faro =

Noble title in the Kingdom of Portugal

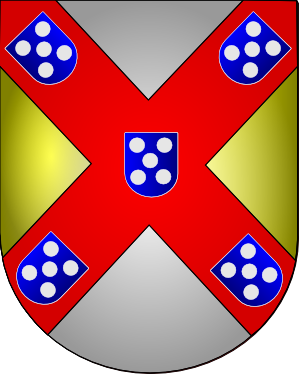
Coat of Arms of Afonso of Braganza, 1st Count of Faro.

Count of Faro (in Portuguese Conde de Faro) was a Portuguese title of nobility granted by royal decree issued on 22 May 1469, by King Afonso V of Portugal, to D. Afonso of Braganza, the third son of Fernando I, Duke of Braganza.

This title refers to the town of Faro do Alentejo and not to the city of Faro, capital of the Algarve. The main estates of this family were located in the Alentejo, especially around the town of Vimieiro.

== List of counts of Odemira (1469) ==
1. Afonso of Braganza (c.1435- ? ), he married Maria de Noronha, 2nd. Countess of Odemira;
2. Estêvão of Faro (c.1550-1629), their great-grandson;
3. Dinis of Faro (c.1570-1633), his son;
4. Joana Juliana Maria Máxima of Faro (c.1610- ? ), her daughter, married twice but had no issue.

== See also ==
- Count of Odemira
- List of countships in Portugal

== Bibliography ==
"Nobreza de Portugal e Brasil" Vol II, pages 65/68. Published by Zairol, Lda., Lisbon, 1989.
