= Nuno Caetano Álvares Pereira de Melo, 6th Duke of Cadaval =

Nuno Caetano Álvares Pereira de Melo
- Duke of Cadaval
- Born: 7 April 1799; Lisbon, Portugal
- Died: 4 February 1837 (aged 37); Lisbon, Portugal
- Burial: Picpus Cemetery
- Spouse: Maria Domingas Francisca de Bragança de Sousa e Ligne (m. 1820)
- House: Cadaval
- Father: Miguel Caetano Álvares Pereira de Melo, 5th Duke of Cadaval
- Mother: Marie Madaleine of Montmorency-Luxembourg

Dom Nuno Caetano Álvares Pereira de Melo, 6th Duke of Cadaval (7 April 1799 – 14 February 1837) was a Portuguese marshal, aristocrat and politician. He was one of the main politicians under King Miguel I during the Liberal Wars, being the Assistant Minister of the Dispatch, the head of government, from February 1828 until July 1831.

After the war, Nuno Caetano went into exile, first in England, and then in Paris, where he died in 1837.
