= Alejandro Finisterre =

Spanish inventor, poet and publisher (1919–2007)

- Alexandre de Fisterra
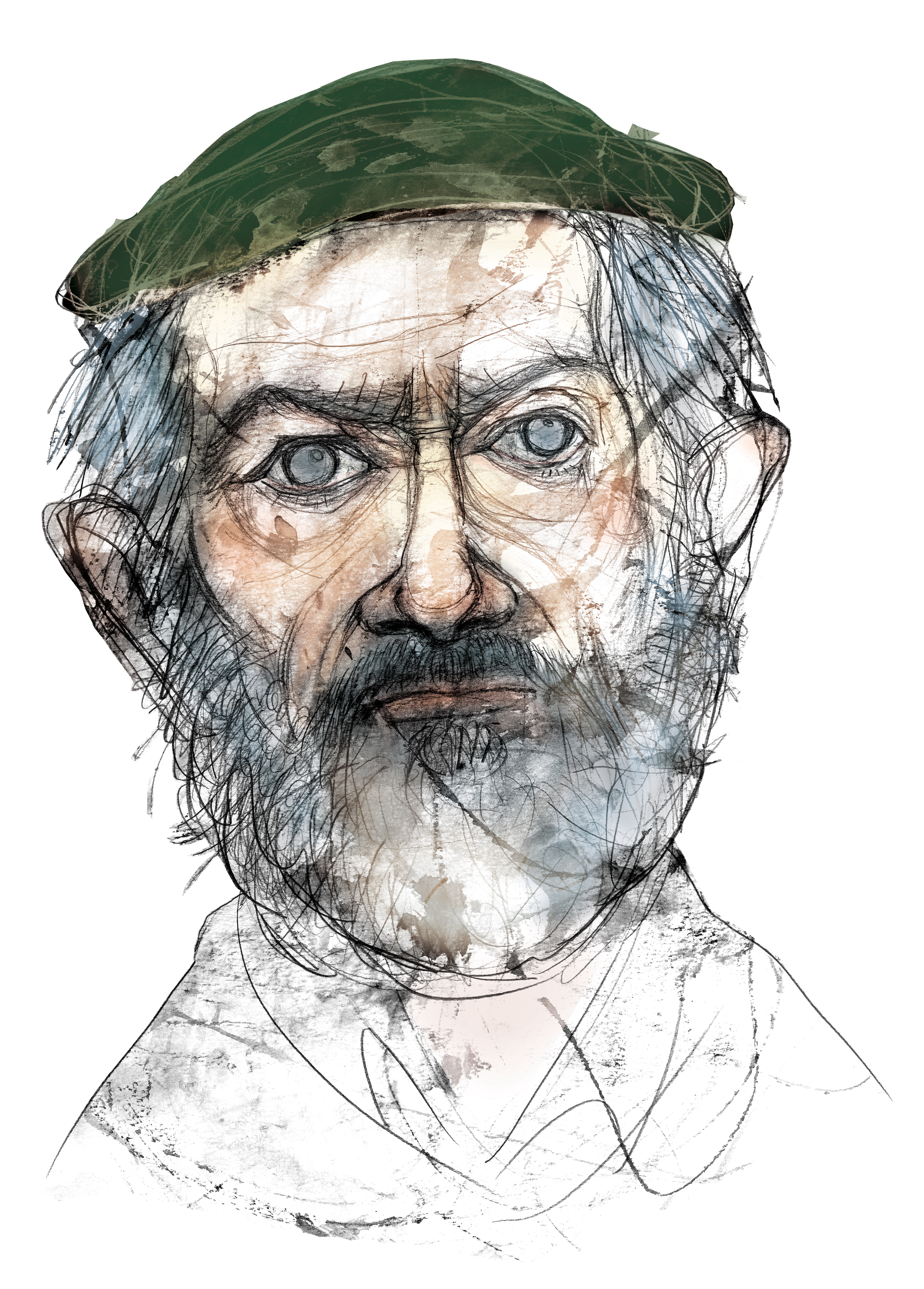
- Portrait of Finisterre
- Born: Alexandre Campos Ramírez; 6 May 1919; Fisterra, Galicia, Spain
- Died: 9 February 2007 (aged 87); Zamora, León, Spain
- Occupations: Inventor; poet; publisher
- Known for: Inventing table football
- Spouse: María Herrero

Alexandre Campos Ramírez (Note: Galician pronunciation: [aleˈʃandɾɪ ˈkampʊs raˈmiɾɪs].) (6 May 1919 – 9 February 2007), commonly known by his pseudonym Alejandro Finisterre, (Note: Spanish pronunciation: [aleˈxandɾo finisˈtere]; Galician: Alexandre de Fisterra, pronounced [aleˈʃandɾɪ ðɪ fisˈtɛrɐ].) was a Galician inventor, poet and publisher, known for inventing the Spanish version of table football.

Born in Galicia, he moved to Madrid at an early age, where he developed a passion for poetry and an anarchist philosophy, inspired by the work of León Felipe. During the Spanish Civil War, he was wounded in the siege of Madrid, leaving him disabled. While recovering, he invented table football as a way for him and his fellow disabled patients to keep playing a version of association football.

After the war, he fled to Latin America, where he sold his invention and continued his publishing activities. After the 1954 Guatemalan coup d'état, he was kidnapped by Francoist agents, but managed to escape by threatening to blow up the plane he was on with a fake bomb. After the Spanish transition to democracy, he returned to his home country, where he continued publishing and became an authority on the works of León Felipe. He spent the last years of his life in conflict with the Zamora city council, as they had accepted his collection of Felipe's works but did not establish a museum for them.

== Biography ==
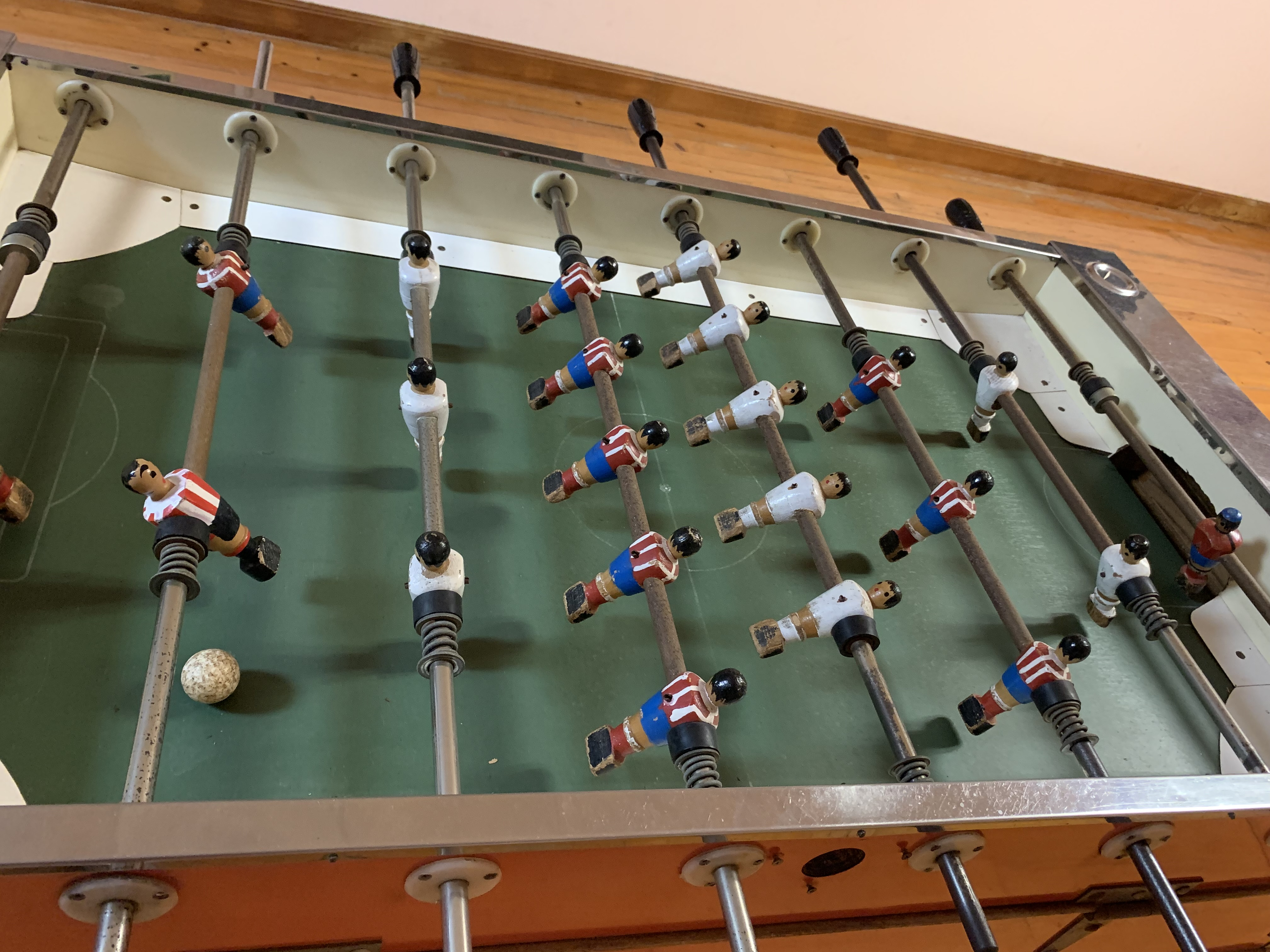
Finisterre invented the modern form of table football.

Alexandre Campos Ramírez was born in the Galician city of Fisterra, on 6 May 1919. He later adopted the surname Finisterre, the Castilianisation of the name of his hometown, as a pseudonym. He was raised by his father, a former telegraphist and later shoemaker, in the provincial capital of A Coruña. When he came of age, Finisterre left home to study in Madrid, working various jobs to pay his way through school after his father went bankrupt. He found work as a construction worker, then as a typographer at a publishing house. While working in publishing, he cultivated his passion for poetry, although he hoped to eventually become an architect. By the outbreak of the Spanish Civil War, he was editing the literary magazine Paso a la Juventud and had met the poet León Felipe, whose anti-capitalism and individualism inspired the young Finisterre. At this time, Finisterre defined himself as a "practical idealist", an anarchist that wanted to create a better world in the present.

During the siege of Madrid in November 1936, Finisterre was wounded in the Nationalist bombing of the city and left disabled. He was taken to a sanatorium in the Catalan mountain range of Montserrat. As he and his fellow patients would no longer be able to play football, he developed an idea to create a table football game (Spanish: futbolín). He hired a carpenter to build the table and carve realistic figurines of the football players. He recalled that the first table was built from pine and the ball was made of cork, which gave players a good amount of control over it. He patented the invention the following year, along with a pedal for musicians to turn the pages of sheet music. In 1939, when he fled the Catalonia Offensive into France, his patents were destroyed by heavy rain. He later rejected recognition as the inventor of the game, saying that if he had not invented it, then someone else would have.

After the war, Finisterre briefly returned to Spain to complete a degree in philosophy, before moving to Paris then on to Ecuador. In 1948, he established the poetry magazine Ecuador 0º 0' 0", which he published in Quito before moving to Guatemala. In 1952, he made money selling his table football game in Guatemala City and even played a game with Che Guevara. The ambassador of the Spanish Republic to Guatemala (which was among the few states that still recognised the republic), foreseeing the coming right-wing 1954 Guatemalan coup d'état, arranged with Finisterre that he would transport some confidential documents to Mexico. Because of that, following the coup, Francoist agents kidnapped Finisterre and put him on a plane back to Spain. On the way, he built a fake bomb with a bar of soap and threatened to blow up the plane if they took him there, forcing the plane to land in Panama and let him off. He moved to Mexico City, where he published hundreds of books by Spanish exiles over the subsequent two decades. He was also reunited with Felipe, for whom he erected a bronze bust in Chapultepec, and came into possession of his papers after he died. In honour of Felipe, he established an international theatre competition in his name. In 1972, he awarded the prize to Wilberto Cantón for his work Entre los hombres como entre las naciones.

With the Spanish transition to democracy in the late 1970s, Finisterre finally returned to Spain. There he wrote extensively about Felipe and republished his works through Alianza Editorial. In 1998, he published Felipe's previously unpublished translations of poems by Emily Dickinson. Finisterre also wrote his own works of poetry, but did not think much of them. In 2003, he sold Felipe's papers to the Zamora city council. This became a source of conflict in the last years of his life, as the council kept them in boxes rather than opening a museum as Finisterre had requested. Finisterre was married to María Herrero, and he died on 9 February 2007. In 2010, a newsletter in Fisterra described him as one of the most important figures in the city's history.

== Bibliography ==
- Alfano, Vincenzo; Capasso, Salvatore (2020). "Habits Do Not Die Easily: The Economics of Table Soccer". The B.E. Journal of Economic Analysis & Policy. 20 (1): 1–19. doi:10.1515/bejeap-2019-0229. ISSN 1935-1682.
- Calvillo, Juan Carlos (2023). "A Catalogue of Emily Dickinson's Spanish Translations". The Emily Dickinson Journal. 32 (1): 64–86. doi:10.1353/edj.2023.a902811. ISSN 1096-858X.
- Eaude, Michael (25 February 2007). "Alejandro Finisterre". The Guardian. ISSN 0261-3077.
- Fauré Polloni, Miguel (11 July 2019). "El poeta anarquista que inventó el taca-taca para la niñez víctima de la Guerra Civil Española". Revista de Frente (in Spanish).
- Gutiérrez, Rosa García; Toda Iglesia, María Ángeles (2023). "Emily Dickinson, Poets' Poet: First Versions in Spanish (Juan Ramón Jiménez, Gilberto Owen, Ernestina de Champourcin)". The Emily Dickinson Journal. 32 (1): 36–63. doi:10.1353/edj.2023.a902810. ISSN 1096-858X.
- Sánchez-Carretero, Cristina (2015). "Heritagization of the Camino to Finisterre". In Sánchez-Carretero, Cristina (ed.). Heritage, Pilgrimage and the Camino to Finisterre. GeoJournal Library. Vol. 117. Springer International Publishing. pp. 95–119. doi:10.1007/978-3-319-20212-9_4. ISBN 978-3-319-20211-2.
- Shirley, Carl R. (1980). "A curriculum operum of Mexico's Wilberto Cantón". Latin American Theatre Review. 13 (2): 47–56.
