= Noronha =

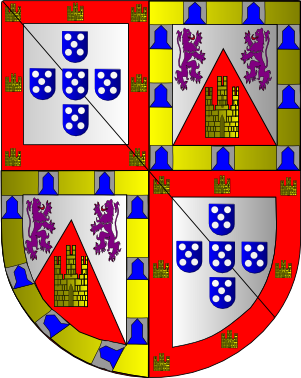
Arms of the Noronha family, showing their royal origins, both Portuguese and Castilian

Noronha is a family name that is found among some aristocratic families in Portugal, and in areas such as Brazil, India, Mozambique, Angola and Macau that were colonized by the Portuguese.

== Origins of the family ==
The family has its origins in the marriage of Alfonso Enríquez, Count of Gijón and Noreña (natural son of King Henry II of Castile) with Isabel of Portugal (natural daughter of King Ferdinand I of Portugal). Their marriage was one of the clauses of the Treaty of Santarém, signed in 1373 between the two peninsular kingdoms.

Alfonso was Count of Noreña, an Asturian village he had received from his father, and his children used the Portuguese spelling Noronha as their family name.

== Notable people with this name ==
Notable people bearing the name include:

- Fernando de Noronha, 2nd Count of Vila Real (c. 1380–1445), son of Alfonso of Gijón-Noreña and Isabel of Portugal, Governor of Ceuta
- Francisco Noronha (1748–1787), Spanish botanist whose standard author abbreviation is Noronha
- Fernão de Noronha (c. 1470 or earlier–c. 1540), corruption of the name of Portuguese explorer, Fernão de Loronha
- M. Helena Noronha, Brazilian-American mathematics educator
- Osnar Noronha (born 1991), Peruvian footballer
- Percival Noronha (1923–2019), Indian historian, heritage conservationist, and bureaucrat.
- Ester Noronha (born 1992), Indian actress and playback singer
- Alfredo Eduardo Barreto de Freitas Noronha (1918–2003), Brazilian footballer
- Several Viceroys or Governors of Portuguese India:
  - Garcia de Noronha, 1538–1540
  - Afonso de Noronha, 1550–1554
  - António de Noronha, 1564–1568
  - António de Noronha o Catarraz, 1571–1573
  - Miguel de Noronha, 4th Count of Linhares, 1629–1635
  - Lourenço de Noronha, 1742–1744

== See also ==
- Fernando de Noronha, Brazilian island group in the Atlantic Ocean
