= León Felipe =

Spanish anti-fascist poet (1884–1968)

León Felipe Camino Galicia
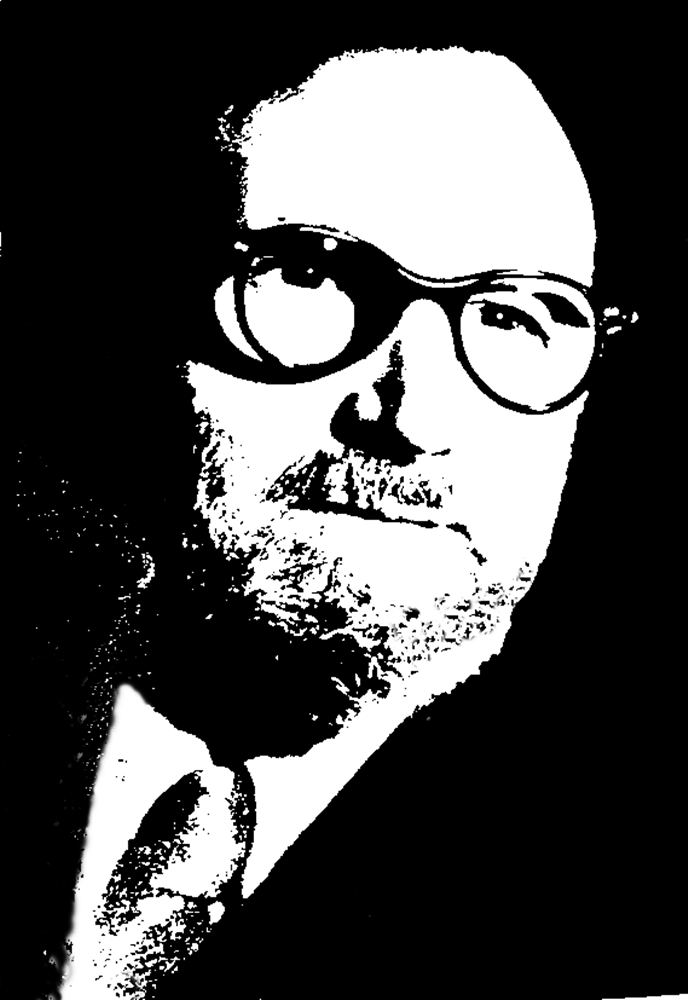
- Felipe in 1963
- Born: 11 April 1884
- Died: 18 September 1968 (aged 84)
- Occupations: Poet, professor of literature

León Felipe Camino Galicia (Spanish pronunciation: [leˈoɱ feˈlipe]; 11 April 1884 – 18 September 1968) was an anti-fascist Spanish poet who also worked as a professor of literature in Spain and the US.

== Biography ==
Felipe was born in Tábara, Zamora, Spain, while his parents were travelling. His father was a public notary and comfortably off. His family settled in Santander. In early adulthood Felipe would study Pharmacology and go into business as a pharmacist, ostensibly to please his father. However, literature exerted a stronger pull on him and he eloped with an itinerant theatre troupe. As a result, he was charged with fraud, due to the bankruptcy caused by dereliction of his business responsibilities, and spent two years in jail. On his release from custody, he started writing for literary reviews and later on his first books were published. He is one of Spain's best twentieth-century poets, and scholars have included him alongside Federico García Lorca, Jorge Guillén, Perdo Salinas, and Vicente Aleixandre among the members of Generation of 1927.

He fought in the Spanish Civil War for the Spanish Republican Army against the Nationalist faction. In 1938 he fled Spain and lived in exile in Mexico, where he died.

His poetry touched upon the difficult Spanish situation and the feeling that history would repeat itself for the worst. His use of reiteration and repetition, the prominence of Biblical motifs, and the Hebrew flavour to (Antología rota, 1947) inspired comparisons with the work of Walt Whitman. His poetry is also characterized by the tropes of Modernismo and the Vanguardismo (Drop a star, 1933). He wrote in free verse.

He lived the last decades of his life in Mexico, where he became a central figure among post-civil-war Spanish exiles. There he met actress and singer Sara Montiel, for whom he felt a great attraction. He died in Mexico City on 17 September 1968.

Seven of Leon Felipe's poems were found in a notebook that Che Guevara was carrying when he was captured by the Bolivian Army and the CIA in 1965.

== Selected poetry ==
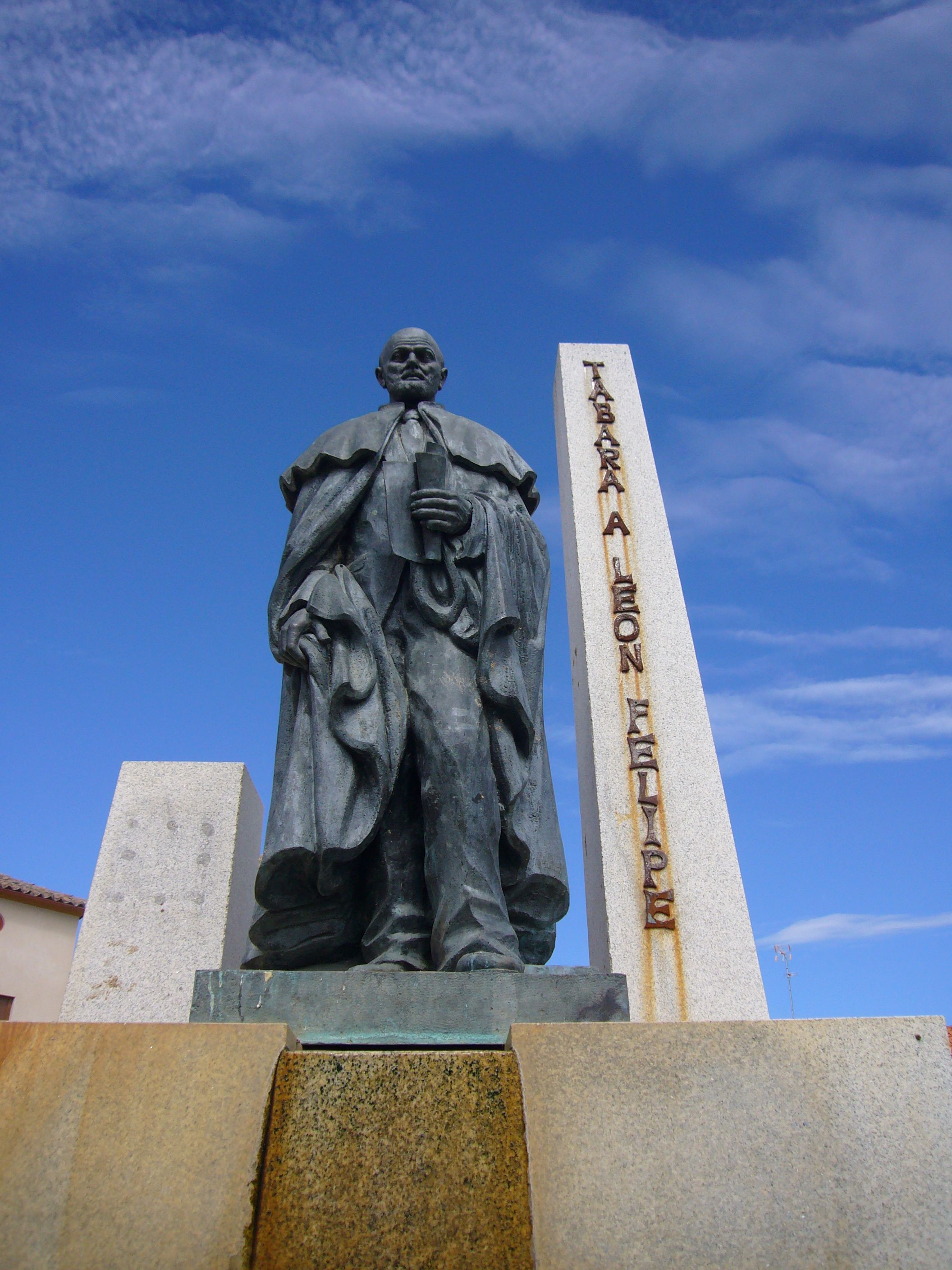
Monument to León Felipe in Tábara, his hometown.

- Versos y oraciones de caminante (I, 1920; II, 1929)
- Drop a star (1933)
- Goodbye, Panamá (1936)
- La insignia (1937)
- El payaso de las bofetadas y el pescador de caña (1938)
- El hacha (1939)
- Español del éxodo y del llanto (1939)
- El gran responsible (1940)
- Traducción de Canto a mí mismo, de Walt Whitman (1941)
- El poeta prometeico (1942)
- Ganarás la luz (1943)
- Parábola y poesía (1944)
- Llamadme Publicano (o Versos y blasfemias de caminante) (1950)
- El ciervo (1958)
- Cuatro poemas, con epígrafe y colofón (1958)
- ¿Qué se hizo del rey don Juan? (1962)
- Oh, este viejo y roto violin! (1965)
- Versos del merolico o del sacamuelas (1967)
- Israel (Discurso poemático pronunciado el 31 de Julio de 1967 y publicado posteriormente en 1970 Finisterre, México D. F.)
- Rocinante (1969)
- Puesto ya el pie en el estribo (1983)

== See also ==
- Alejandro Finisterre
