= Luísa de Bragança, Duchess of Cadaval =

Duchess Luísa
- Duchess of Cadaval
- Born: 9 January 1679; Lisbon, Kingdom of Portugal
- Died: 23 December 1732 (aged 53); Évora, Alentejo
- Burial: Convent of Saint John the Evangelist
- Spouse: Luís of Cadaval; Jaime, Duke of Cadaval
- House: House of Braganza
- Father: Pedro II of Portugal
- Mother: Maria da Cruz Mascarenhas

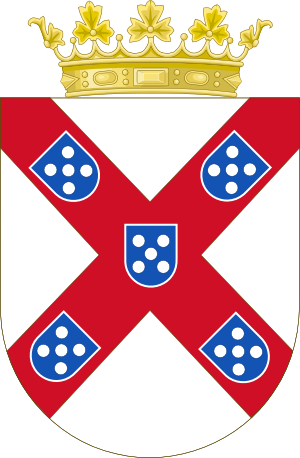
Duchy of Braganza (1640-1910)

Luísa of Braganza, Duchess of Cadaval (Portuguese pronunciation: [luˈizɐ]; 9 January 1679 in Lisbon – 23 December 1732 in Évora) was a natural daughter of Portuguese King Peter II and a Portuguese lady named Maria da Cruz Mascarenhas.

She was raised among the family of the Secretary of State, Francisco Correia de Lacerda and after that at the Monastery of Carnide with her aunt Maria of Braganza (natural daughter of John IV of Portugal). Luísa married D. Luís and after his death married D. Jaime de Melo, respectively the 2nd and 3rd dukes of Cadaval.

She died in Évora, Alentejo, and was buried at the Convent of Saint John the Evangelist in the same city.
