= Rodrigo Afonso de Melo, 1st Count of Olivença =

Portuguese colonial administrator

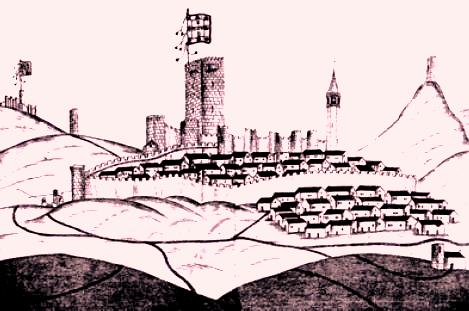
Castle of Olivença, designed by Duarte D'Armas, squire of the Portuguese king D. Manuel I, in 1509.

Rodrigo (or Rui) Afonso de Melo, 1st Count of Olivença (ca. 1430-25 November 1487) was a Portuguese nobleman, son of Martim Afonso de Melo, Lord of Ferreira de Aves e Chief-Guard of king Edward of Portugal.

He was Lord of Ferreira de Aves, Arega and Quinta de Água de Peixes, he was also king Afonso V's Chief-Guard, as well as governor of Tangier, escorting the king to his expeditions to north Africa. He also participated in king's Afonso V expedition to conquer Arzila.

Rodrigo married, in 1457, Isabel de Menezes, and the couple had three daughters:

- Philippa de Melo (ca. 1460–1516), his heir, married to Álvaro of Braganza, from whom descends the Álvares Pereira de Melo family, Dukes of Cadaval;
- Margarida de Vilhena (ca. 1450- ? ), married to Pedro de Castro, without issue;
- Brianda de Melo.

Rodrigo started to build the S. João Evangelista Convent (also known as Lóios Convent), in Évora, which was concluded under his daughter Philippa supervision, due to the count's death. The convent is next to the Palace of the Dukes of Cadaval, Rodrigo's heirs.

== See also ==
- Count of Olivença
- Duke of Cadaval
- List of countships in Portugal

== Bibliography ==
- ”Nobreza de Portugal e do Brasil” – Vol. III, page 78. Published by Zairol Lda., Lisbon 1989.
