= Diana Álvares Pereira de Melo, 11th Duchess of Cadaval =

Diana de Cadaval

Duchess of Cadaval
- Predecessor: Jaime Álvares Pereira de Melo, 10th Duke of Cadaval
- Born: 25 July 1978 (age 47); Geneva, Switzerland
- Spouse: Prince Charles Philippe d’Orléans (m. 2008; div. 2022)
- Issue: Princess Isabelle d’Orléans
Names
- Diana Mariana Vitória Álvares Pereira de Melo
- House: Cadaval
- Father: Jaime Álvares Pereira de Melo, 10th Duke of Cadaval
- Mother: Claudine Marguerite Tritz

Dona Diana Álvares Pereira de Melo, 11th Duchess of Cadaval (born 25 July 1978), more commonly known as Diana de Cadaval, is a Portuguese author and noblewoman. The duchess has authored several books on Portuguese history and Portuguese architecture.

== Early life ==
Diana Mariana Vitória Álvares Pereira de Melo, 11th Duchess of Cadaval is the eldest daughter of Jaime Álvares Pereira de Melo, 10th Duke of Cadaval and his second wife, Claudine Marguerite Marianne Tritz.

== Career ==
She studied international communication at the American University of Paris and attended the American School of Lisbon as a child. She manages the House of Cadaval's properties, which historically include the Palace of the Dukes of Cadaval in Évora, and the Muge estate in Santarém.

In the summer of 2015, the duchess collaborated with Hubert de Givenchy to open to the public an exhibit of haute couture bridal gowns in the palace church, Saint John-the-Evangelist. Chosen and arranged by Givenchy, the twelve dresses on display were originals borrowed from such designers as Yves Saint-Laurent, Balenciaga, Dior and include "The Nun" gown designed in 1972 for the marriage of the Spanish Caudillo Franco's granddaughter, Carmen Martínez-Bordiú to Alfonso XIII's grandson Alfonso de Bourbon, Duke of Cadíz, as well as the Givenchy dress Diana wore for her own 2008 wedding.

She is also an author of several books on personalities pertaining to the history of the Portuguese monarchy, which she publishes under the name of Diana de Cadaval.

== Family ==
Dona Diana's father Jaime Álvares Pereira de Melo (1913-2001) was the son of Dom Mino Álvares Pereira de Melo, who was the head of the 3rd branch of the House of Bragance, the son of countess Zileri dal Verme, née Lucchesi-Palli, the daughter of Marie-Caroline of Bourbon-Two Sicilies, Duchess of Berry. His father married his future mother Diane de Gramont, the daughter of Arnaud de Gramont and of countess de Gramont, née Brincard on the 2nd of December 1911 in Saint-Pierre-du-Gros-Caillou church in Pau. Dom Mino was the great-grandson of Duke of Montmorency-Luxembourg.

Jaime Álvares Pereira de Melo was married twice, but only the second marriage was a religious ceremony. Diana has two older half-sisters, an older half-brother (born from her father's extramarital relationship) and a younger sister:

- Dona Rosalinda Aurora Felicidade Álvares Pereira de Melo (born 1936), Duchess of Cadaval-Hermès, Marquise of Ferreira and Countess of Tentugal
- Dona Maria Graziela Consuelo Álvares Pereira de Melo (born 1938)
- Jaime Álvares Pereira de Melo (born 1946)
- Dona Alexandra Eugénia Álvares Pereira de Melo (born 1982)

When the Duke died in 2001, the eldest daughters of both marriages, Rosalinda and Diana, disputed the family heritage. Dom Duarte Pio, Duke of Braganza recognized Diana as 11th Duchess of Cadaval (on a non-hereditary basis, as all holders of the Dukedom of Cadaval in the past have obtained royal recognition of the title during their lifetime), acting on the authority attributed to him post-monarchy by the Conselho de Nobreza (Council of the Nobility) as Head of the Royal House of Braganza. He recognized for her eldest half-sister, Dona Rosalinda, the new title of Duchess of Cadaval-Hermès, as she's married to Hubert Guerrand-Hermès, heir of Hermès.

== Marriage ==
On 21 June 2008, Dona Diana married Prince Charles Philippe d'Orléans, (born 1973), a grandson of the Orleanist pretender Henri, Count of Paris. Charles Philippe bears the Orleanist title, Duke of Anjou. The ceremony took place in the Cathedral of Évora, a monument declared a World Heritage Site by UNESCO in 1988. Both wife and husband are Capetians, descending in unbroken male line from King Robert II of France (972–1031), Diana from his younger son Robert I, Duke of Burgundy through the royal (though illegitimate) Portuguese branch of the House of Braganza, and Charles-Philippe through the elder son, King Henry I of France, via the cadet branch of the House of Bourbon-Orléans. The couple are also fifth cousins once-removed through shared descent from King Francis I of the Two Sicilies.

Diana's only child by Charles-Philippe, Princess Isabelle d'Orléans, was born on 22 February 2012 in Lisbon, Portugal. She is named after her great-grandmother, the Countess of Paris, born Princess Isabelle of Orléans-Braganza. Her godparents are Princess Maria-Theodora of Löwenstein-Wertheim-Freudenberg and Felipe VI of Spain (at the time the Prince of Asturias). Isabelle bears the title "Princess d'Orléans" and the style of Royal Highness. She is not expected to inherit her mother's ducal title, because of the terms of its recognition. Traditionally, male Orléans dynasts receive individual, non-hereditary noble titles derived from the historical appanages of the French royal family.

In December 2022, the divorce of Diana and Charles-Philippe was announced.

== See also ==
- Palace of the Dukes of Cadaval

Portuguese nobility
| Preceded by Jaime Álvares Pereira de Melo | Duchess of Cadaval; 2001—present | Incumbent |
