= Count of Olivença =

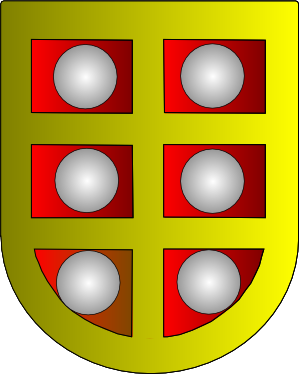
The Coat of Arms of the Melo family, Counts of Olivença.

Count of Olivença, (Portuguese: Conde de Olivença) was a Portuguese title of nobility created by a royal decree, on 21 July 1424, by King Afonso V of Portugal, and granted to Dom Rodrigo Afonso of Melo.

He was the sole count of this title. His daughter and heir, Dona Filipa de Melo, married Álvaro of Braganza. From this marriage descends the House of Cadaval.

== List of counts of Olivença ==
- Rodrigo Afonso de Melo, Count of Olivença (c.1430-1487)

== See also ==
- List of countships in Portugal

== Bibliography ==
- "Nobreza de Portugal e do Brasil" – Vol. III, page 78. Published by Zairol Lda., Lisbon 1989.
