= Palace of the Dukes of Cadaval =

Building in Évora, Évora District, Portugal

- Palácio dos Duques de Cadaval (Portuguese)
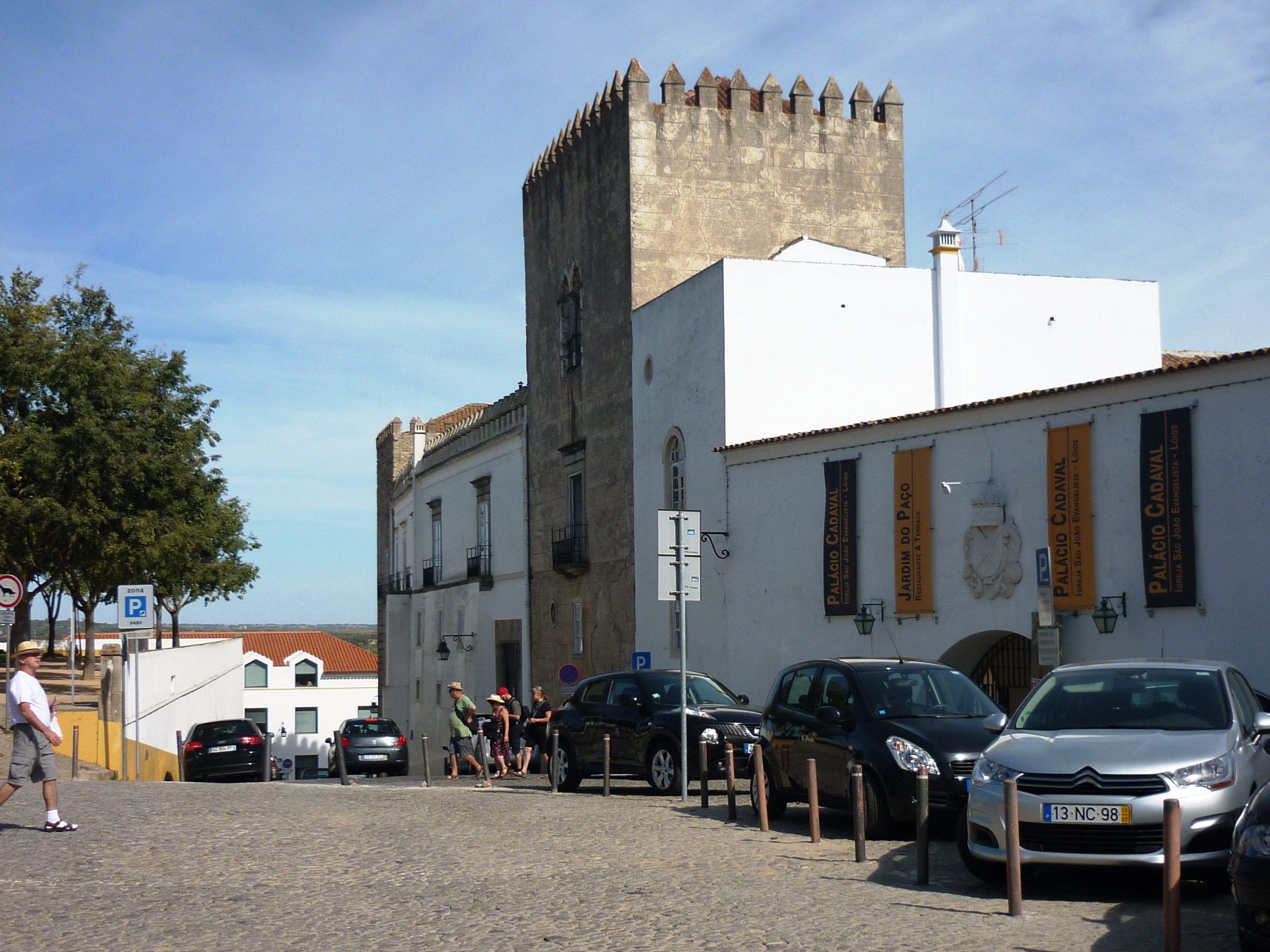
- Interactive map of the Palace of the Dukes of Cadaval area
- Alternative names: Palácio de Cadaval

General information
- Type: Palace
- Location: 7000-845 Évora, Portugal, Évora, Portugal
- Coordinates: 38.5732°N 7.9076°W
- Construction started: 6th century

Website
- www.palaciocadaval.com

The Palace of the Dukes of Cadaval (Portuguese: Palácio dos Duques de Cadaval), as it is also called, is a palace located in the acropolis of Évora, in Portugal.

This palace, which has belonged to Casa Cadaval since its foundation, is made up of the manor house and the Lóios Church, presenting a combination of Mudéjar, Gothic and Manueline styles. The Palace includes a pentagonal (medieval) tower, the Torre das Cinco Quinas, which has been classified as a National Monument since 1920.

It was in this Palace, on May 29, 1483, that Fernando II, Duke of Bragança was arrested and dragged to his death at the behest of King João II of Portugal.

== History ==
=== The family ===
The Dukes of Cadaval are a branch of the House of Braganza, the most powerful in Portugal and from which the Fourth Dynasty emerged.

The Duchy of Cadaval was created on April 26, 1648, the day of the birth of the infant Dom Pedro, the future Dom Pedro II, King of Portugal, by King João IV. The title was created in favor of Dom Nuno Álvares Pereira de Melo (1638–1727), son of Dom Francisco de Melo, one of the supporters of the Restoration of Independence in 1640, from whom he would inherit the titles of Count of Tentúgal and Marquis of Ferreira. The merger of these Houses made Dom Nuno one of the most powerful nobles in the kingdom, to which the family's fight for the cause of Independence contributed greatly, both during the succession crisis of 1580 and the Restoration of Independence in 1640.

Among the privileges of the House of Cadaval was the lordly authority to appoint or confirm municipal councils, and to appoint ombudsmen, clerks, inquirers, accountants and other positions in the lands under its jurisdiction.

The current representative is Diana Álvares Pereira de Melo, who was confirmed by Duarte Pio, Duke of Braganza, at the end of the so-called "Cadaval Case", a succession crisis created by the death in 2001 of Jaime Álvares Pereira de Melo, the previous representative of the title.

=== The palace ===
The original palace was built in the 14th century next to the Tower of Évora, where the nobleman Martim Afonso de Mello, servant of the Master of Avis and descendant of the Portuguese Crown, ordered the construction of the Palace of the Tower of the Five Corners, the name by which it is also known. The palace was built partly on the Roman-Visigoth walls of the old Évora Castle, incorporating traces of both in its structure, visible in the fortified military outlines of the building, as well as the imposing tower on the main façade, a vestige of the castle. At the back of the Palace, you can admire the extraordinary Torre das Cinco Quinas, the famous pentagonal tower that gave it its name.

In addition to the large outdoor gardens and the numerous rooms and halls that make up the building, it also houses the Casa Cadaval exhibition rooms, which house a collection of illuminated codices, sculptures, paintings and armory, with pieces dating from between the 15th and 18th centuries.

Several Portuguese monarchs temporarily resided in this palace, including Dom João II, Dom João IV and Dom João V. Also imprisoned in this palace was Dom Fernando II, 3rd Duke of Braganza, accused of plotting against King Dom João II and beheaded in Praça do Giraldo, the main square of the Alentejo capital, in 1483.

In the early 1990s, the palace underwent a restoration campaign promoted by Dª Claudine Marguerite Marianne Tritz, then Duchess of Cadaval, wife of the 10th Duke of Cadaval and mother of the current duchess.

== Nowadays ==
Nowadays, the palace, which combines the tourist character conferred by the adjoining Church of the Lóios (or Church of St. John the Evangelist) with its historical and architectural value, has been the stage for various cultural events. Among these is the "Festival Évora Clássica", an annual music festival promoted since 1994 on the initiative of Ms. Claudine herself. This festival, initially dedicated to Western music concerts, has expanded year after year to include musical styles from all over the world.

In one part of the garden, a pleasant restaurant with a terrace has been open to the public since the mid-1990s, named Jardim do Paço.

On June 21, 2008, the palace hosted a reception for around 400 guests on the occasion of the marriage of Her Excellency Diana Álvares Pereira de Melo, 11th Duchess of Cadaval, to H.R.H. Charles Phillipe d'Orleães, Prince of Órleães and Duke of Anjou, celebrated that same day in Évora Cathedral by the Archbishop Emeritus of Évora, D. Maurílio Jorge Quintal de Gouveia.

== See also ==
- Duke of Cadaval
- Évora
