= San Xuan de Nieva =

- Parish
- Location within Spain
- Country: Spain
- Autonomous community: Asturias
- Province: Asturias
- Municipality: Avilés

Population (2011)
  - Total: 13

San Xuan de Nieva (Spanish: Laviana) is one of six parishes (administrative divisions) in Avilés, a municipality within the province and autonomous community of Asturias, in northern Spain.

It is .22 km^{2} (0.085 sq mi) in size with a population of 13 (INE 2011).
