= Manuel Teles da Silva, 3rd Marquis of Alegrete =

Manuel Teles da Silva
- Marquis of Alegrete
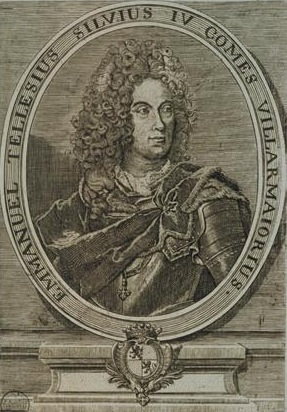
- Born: 6 February 1682
- Died: 9 February 1736 (aged 54)

Manuel Teles da Silva, 3rd Marquis of Alegrete, 4th Count of Vila Maior (6 February 1682 — 9 February 1736), was a Portuguese nobleman, statesman, and historian.

== Career ==
Manuel Teles da Silva was a Fidalgo of the Royal Household of João V of Portugal. In 1729 he became commander of the chapters of the Order of Christ in Albufeira and other nearby locales.

With the creation of the Royal Academy of History, under direction of João V, the Marquis of Alegrete became the Secretary of the Academy. Working alongside his father and grandfather, he studied the History of mathematics and horsemanship.

== Works ==
- History of the Royal Academy of Portuguese History; 1727
- Collection of the Documents and Memories of the Academy; 1723
- Epitome of the History of Portugal up to King John III
- Treatise on the Sphere(divided into twelve treatises)
- Treatise on the Origin of Printing
- Useful Instruction for Those Beginning to Read History

== Family ==
On 8 September 1698, Teles da Silva married Eugênia Rosa de Lorena, daughter of Nuno Álvares Pereira de Melo, 1st Duke of Cadaval. The couple had seven children in total, only six of who survived to adulthood.

- Margarida Ana de Lorena (1703-?), married Estêvão de Meneses, 1st Marquis of Penalva, 5th Count of Tarouca
- Fernão Teles da Silva (1703-1759), 4th Marquis of Alegrete, 5th Count of Vila Maior
- Helena Josefa de Lorena (1704-1738), married Manuel de Assis Mascarenhas, 3rd Count of Óbidos
- Nuno Teles da Silva (1709-1739), married Maria Josefa Francisca Xavier Baltasar da Gama, 4th Marquis of Niza, 8th Count of Vidigueira
- Ana Clara de Lorena (1710-1711), died prematurely
- Luísa de Lorena (1712-?), married José João de Portugal e Castro, 3rd Marquis of Valença, 9th Count of Vimioso
- Maria de Lorena (1716-?), married Pedro José de Noronha Camões, 3rd Marquis of Angeja, 4th Count of Vila Verde
