= Álvaro de Bragança =

Fourth son of Fernando I, 2nd Duke of Braganza

Álvaro of Braganza (c. 1440 – 1503, Toledo) was the 4th son of Ferdinand I, 2nd Duke of Braganza and his wife, Dona Joana de Castro.

== Biography ==
Álvaro played an important role during the reign of King Afonso V of Portugal, when he was appointed Chancellor of the Kingdom. He took part in the king's expeditions against Castile (War of the Castilian Succession) and in the king's voyage to France. On his return to Portugal, he married Dona Filipa de Melo (c. 1460–1516), the rich daughter and heiress of Rodrigo Afonso de Melo, 1st Count of Olivença. They had two sons and four daughters:

- Rodrigo de Melo (1468–1545), made 1st Count of Tentúgal (by royal decree of King Manuel I of Portugal, dated from 1504) and 1st Marquis of Ferreira (by royal decree of King John III of Portugal, dated from 1533). He was the origin of the House of Cadaval;
- Jorge Alberto de Portugal y Melo (1470- ? ), made 1st Count of Gelves (in Spain) by King Charles I of Spain (emperor Charles V); married firstly Guiomar, the daughter of the Conde de Bedigueyra, and had no successors with her; and married secondly Isabel Colón de Toledo, daughter of Diego Columbus (son of Christopher Columbus), I Duque de Veragua, I Marqués of Jamaica and doña María de Toledo y Roxas, and had children;
- Isabel de Castro, married the Spanish Alonso de Sotomaior, 4th Count of Belalcazar;
- Beatriz de Vilhena, married the Portuguese George, Duke of Coimbra;
- Joana de Vilhena, married the Portuguese Francisco de Portugal, 1st Count of Vimioso;
- Maria de Menezes, married the Portuguese João da Silva, 1st Count of Portalegre.

When King John II of Portugal succeeded on the throne of Portugal and began clashing with the high aristocracy, namely the Braganzas, Dom Álvaro tried an approach with the King, but he was unsuccessful. In 1483, his older brother, Ferdinand II, 3rd Duke of Braganza was executed, the family estates were confiscated, and the remaining family (Álvaro included) exiled to Castile. The Catholic Monarchs placed Álvaro on the Royal Council.

Queen Isabella I granted Dom Álvaro important estates in Gelves, and he was appointed Mayor of Seville and Andújar. He also took part in the conquest of the Kingdom of Granada led by the Catholic Monarchs.

When King John II died, Álvaro of Braganza returned to Portugal, where the new King, Manuel I, appointed him as special ambassador to Castile to negotiate the King's marriage to princess Isabella of Aragon. Later he also negotiated the King's second marriage.

Álvaro of Braganza died in Segovia in September 1503. His body was later transferred to the Convent of St. John Evangelist, in Évora.

== Gallery ==
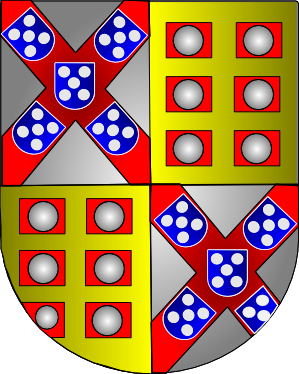
Coat of Arms of Álvaro of Braganza after his marriage with Philippa of Melo, mixing the Braganzas coat of arms with the Melo family's.

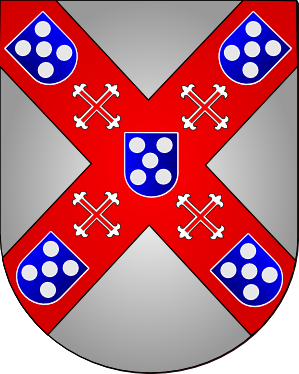
The Coat of Arms of the Dukes of Cadaval, descendants of Dom Álvaro.

== Ancestry ==
Ancestors of Álvaro de Bragança

8. John I of Portugal
4. Afonso, 1st Duke of Braganza
9. Inês Pires
2. Fernando I, Duke of Braganza
10. Nuno Álvares Pereira
5. Beatriz Pereira de Alvim
11. Leonor de Alvim
1. Álvaro of Braganza
12. Pedro de Castro, Lord of Cadaval
6. João de Castro, Lord of Cadaval
13. Leonor de Menezes
3. Joana de Castro
14. Martim Vasques da Cunha, Count of Valencia de Camp
7. Leonor da Cunha
15. Teresa Tellez-Giron

== See also ==
- House of Braganza
- Duke of Braganza
- Duke of Cadaval

== Bibliography ==
- Owens, J. B. (2005). "The Catholic Monarchs and the Legacy of John II". By My Absolute Royal Authority. Vol. 3. Boydell & Brewer.
- "Nobreza de Portugal e do Brasil" – Vol. II, pages 439–440. Published by Zairol Lda., Lisbon 1989.
