= Tábara =

Place in Castile and León, Spain

Coordinates: 41°49′N 5°57′W

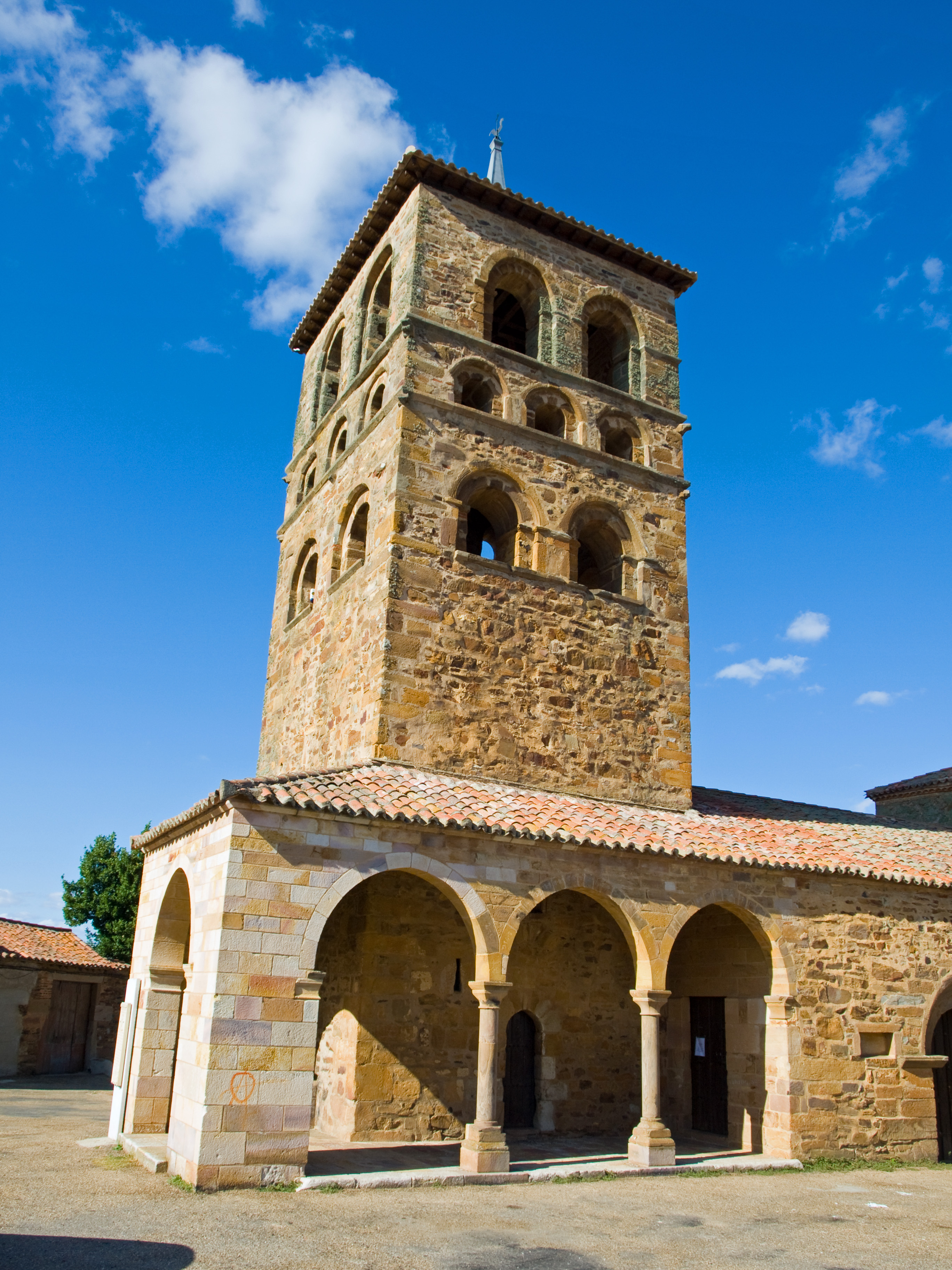
- Church of Tábara

- Flag Coat of arms
- Interactive map of Tábara
- Country: Spain
- Autonomous community: Castile and León
- Province: Zamora
- Comarca: Tierra de Tábara

Area
  - Total: 112 km^{2} (43 sq mi)

Population (2025-01-01)
  - Total: 743
  - Density: 6.63/km^{2} (17.2/sq mi)
- Time zone: UTC+1 (CET)
  - Summer (DST): UTC+2 (CEST)

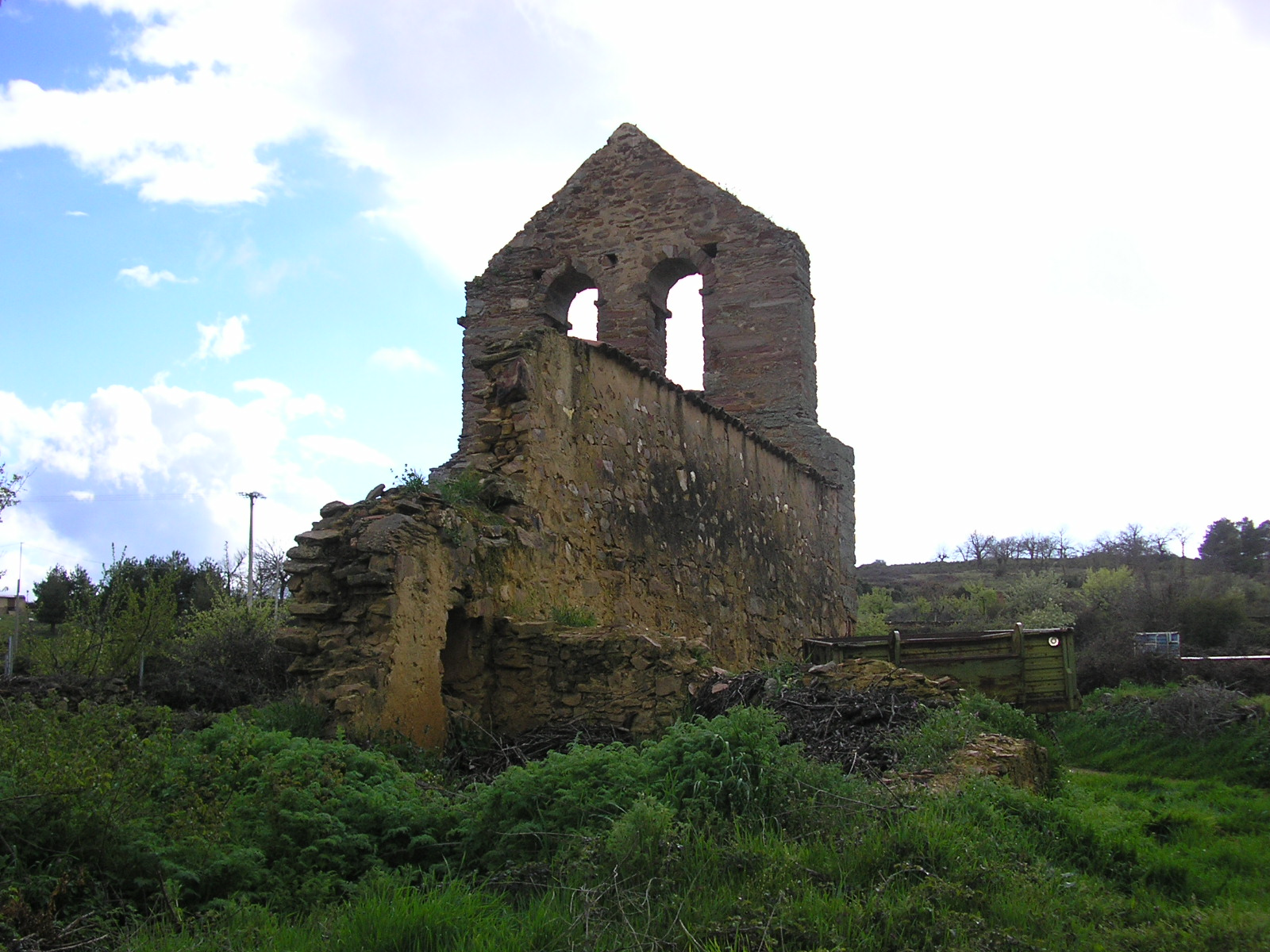
Ruined church with large bell-gable near Tábara

Tábara is a municipality located in the province of Zamora, Castile and León, Spain. According to the 2004 census (INE), the municipality has a population of 950 inhabitants. Tábara is the capital of the Tierra de Tábara comarca.

Tábara is located in the vicinity of the Sierra de la Culebra range, an important place for agritourism and wildlife watching.

Spanish poet León Felipe (1884–1968) was born in this town.
