= Duke of Cadaval =

Title of Portuguese nobility

Dukedom of Cadaval
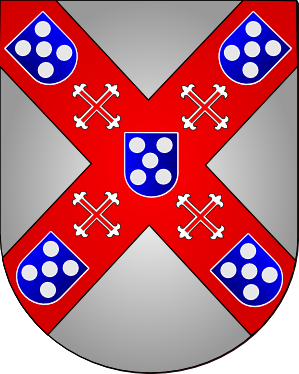
- Parent house: Braganza
- Country: Portugal
- Founded: 1648
- Founder: Nuno Álvares Pereira de Melo, 4th Marquis of Ferreira
- Current head: Diana Álvares Pereira de Melo, 11th Duchess of Cadaval
- Titles: Duke of Cadaval; Marquis of Ferreira; Count of Tentúgal
- Estate: Palace of the Dukes of Cadaval

Duke of Cadaval is a title of Portuguese nobility. It was created on 26 April 1648 by King John IV of Portugal for his distant cousin, Dom Nuno Álvares Pereira de Melo (1638–1725), who was already 4th Marquis of Ferreira and 5th Count of Tentúgal.

The Dukes of Cadaval trace their origins to Dom Álvaro of Braganza, Lord of Tentúgal, Póvoa, Buarcos and Cadaval, fourth son of Dom Ferdinand I, 2nd Duke of Braganza. Dom Álvaro married Dona Filipa de Melo, the rich daughter and heiress of Rodrigo Afonso de Melo, 1st Count of Olivença.

== List of dukes of Cadaval ==
1. D. Nuno Álvares Pereira de Melo (1638–1725)
2. D. Luís Ambrósio Álvares Pereira de Melo (1679–1700)
3. D. Jaime Álvares Pereira de Melo (1684–1749)
4. D. Nuno Caetano Álvares Pereira de Melo (1741–1771)
5. D. Miguel Caetano Álvares Pereira de Melo (1765–1808)
6. D. Nuno Caetano Álvares Pereira de Melo (1799–1837)
7. D. Maria da Piedade Álvares Pereira de Melo (1827–1859)
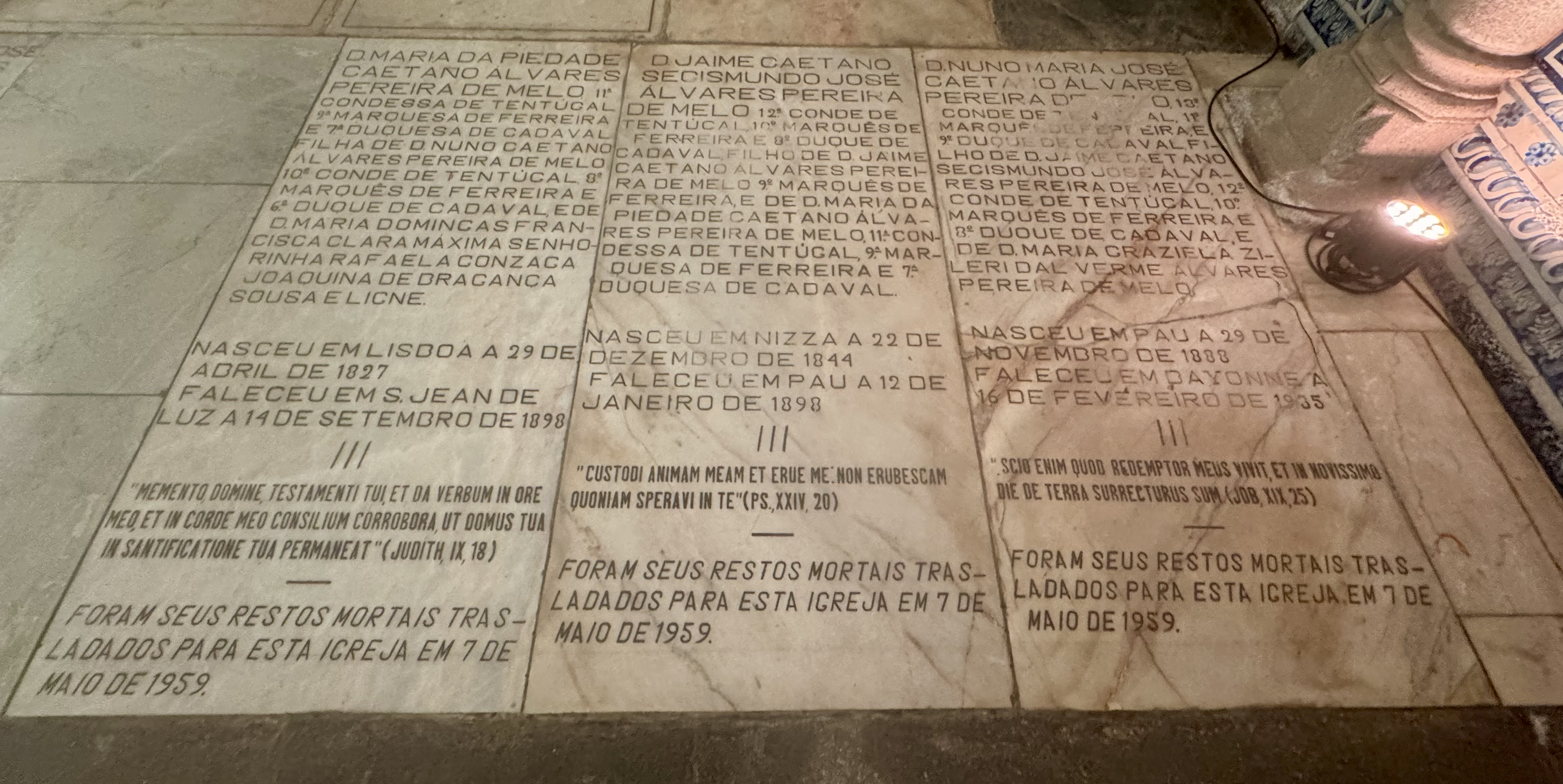
  Tombs of the 7th, 8th and 9th Dukes of Cadaval (August 2025)
8. D. Jaime Segismundo Álvares Pereira de Melo (1844–1913)
9. D. Nuno Maria José Caetano Álvares Pereira de Melo (1888–1935)
10. D. Jaime Álvares Pereira de Melo (1913–2001)
11. D. Diana Álvares Pereira de Melo (b. 1978)

== Other titles ==
- Count of Tentúgal (in 1504, by King Manuel I of Portugal)
- Marquis of Ferreira (in 1533, by King John III of Portugal)

== Family name ==
The ducal family's name is Álvares Pereira de Melo.

Dom Nuno Álvares Pereira, the remarkable Constable of Portugal, is among their ancestors.

== Duchess of Cadaval-Hermès ==
When Jaime Álvares Pereira de Melo, 10th Duke of Cadaval died in 2001, he left four daughters: two from his first (civil) marriage (with Antoinette Louise Schweisguth, ex-wife of René Durrieu, 4th Baron Durrieu), and two others from his second (religious) marriage (with Claudine Marguerite Marianne Tritz). Leadership of the house and its possessions was disputed by the elder daughters of each marriage:

- Rosalinda Álvares Pereira de Melo (born 1936), elder daughter of the Duke's first (civil) marriage;
- Diana Álvares Pereira de Melo (born 1978), elder daughter of the Duke's second (religious) marriage.

Duarte Pio de Bragança, in the de jure capacity of Head of the historical Royal House of Portugal, recognized Diana Álvares Pereira de Melo as the 11th Duchess of Cadaval.

However, he also granted to her eldest half-sister, Rosalinda Álvares Pereira de Melo, the new title of Duchess of Cadaval-Hermès, because she is married to Hubert Guerrand-Hermès, the House of Hermès's heir. Dona Rosalinda also obtained both titles of Marquise of Ferreira and Countess of Tentúgal, historically allocated to the heir of the Duke of Cadaval. But Rosalinda (or her heirs) isn't the designated heir to the Duchy and the person to succeed her younger half sister as Duchess of Cadaval will be chosen by the Duke of Braganza at the time of the death of the current Duchess.

There is some controversy about the Cadaval-Hermès title, as effectively it constitutes a new creation since the inauguration of the republican regime in Portugal. The Republic abolished all titles of Portuguese nobility in 1910.

== Genealogical summary ==
Fernando I (1403–1478); 2nd.Duke of Braganza | Rodrigo de Melo (1430–1487); 1st.Count of Olivença
Fernando II (1430–1506); 3rd.Duke of Braganza | Afonso (1435- ? ) 1st.Count of Faro; 2nd.Count of Odemira | Álvaro (1440- ? ) Lord of Tentúgal and Cadaval | Philippa de Melo (1460–1516)
Rodrigo de Melo (1468–1545); 1st.Count of Tentúgal; 1st.Marquis of Ferreira
House of Braganza | Counts of Faro; Counts of Odemira; Counts of Vimieiro | Francisco I de Melo (1520–1588); 2nd.Count of Tentúgal; 2nd.Marquis of Ferreira
Nuno Álvares Pereira de Melo (1555–1597); 3rd.Count of Tentúgal
Francisco II de Melo (1588–1645); 4th.Count of Tentúgal; 3rd.Marquis of Ferreira
Nuno I Álvares Pereira de Melo (1638–1727); 5th.Count of Tentúgal; 4th.Marquis of Ferreira; 1st.Duke of Cadaval
House of Cadaval

== See also ==
- Dukedoms in Portugal
- Palace of the Dukes of Cadaval

== Bibliography ==
- ”Nobreza de Portugal e do Brasil” – Vol. II, pages 459-463. Published by Zairol Lda., Lisbon 1989.
