= Celeirós, Aveleda e Vimieiro =

- Civil parish
- Location in Portugal
- Coordinates: 41.514°N 8.452°W
- Country: Portugal
- Region: Norte
- Intermunic. comm.: Cávado
- District: Braga
- Municipality: Braga

Area
  - Total: 7.57 km^{2} (2.92 sq mi)

Population (2011)
  - Total: 6,671
  - Density: 880/km^{2} (2,300/sq mi)
- Time zone: UTC+00:00 (WET)
  - Summer (DST): UTC+01:00 (WEST)

Celeirós, Aveleda e Vimieiro is a civil parish in the municipality of Braga, Portugal. It was formed in 2013 by the merger of the former parishes Celeirós, Aveleda and Vimieiro. in an area of 7.57 km^{2}.

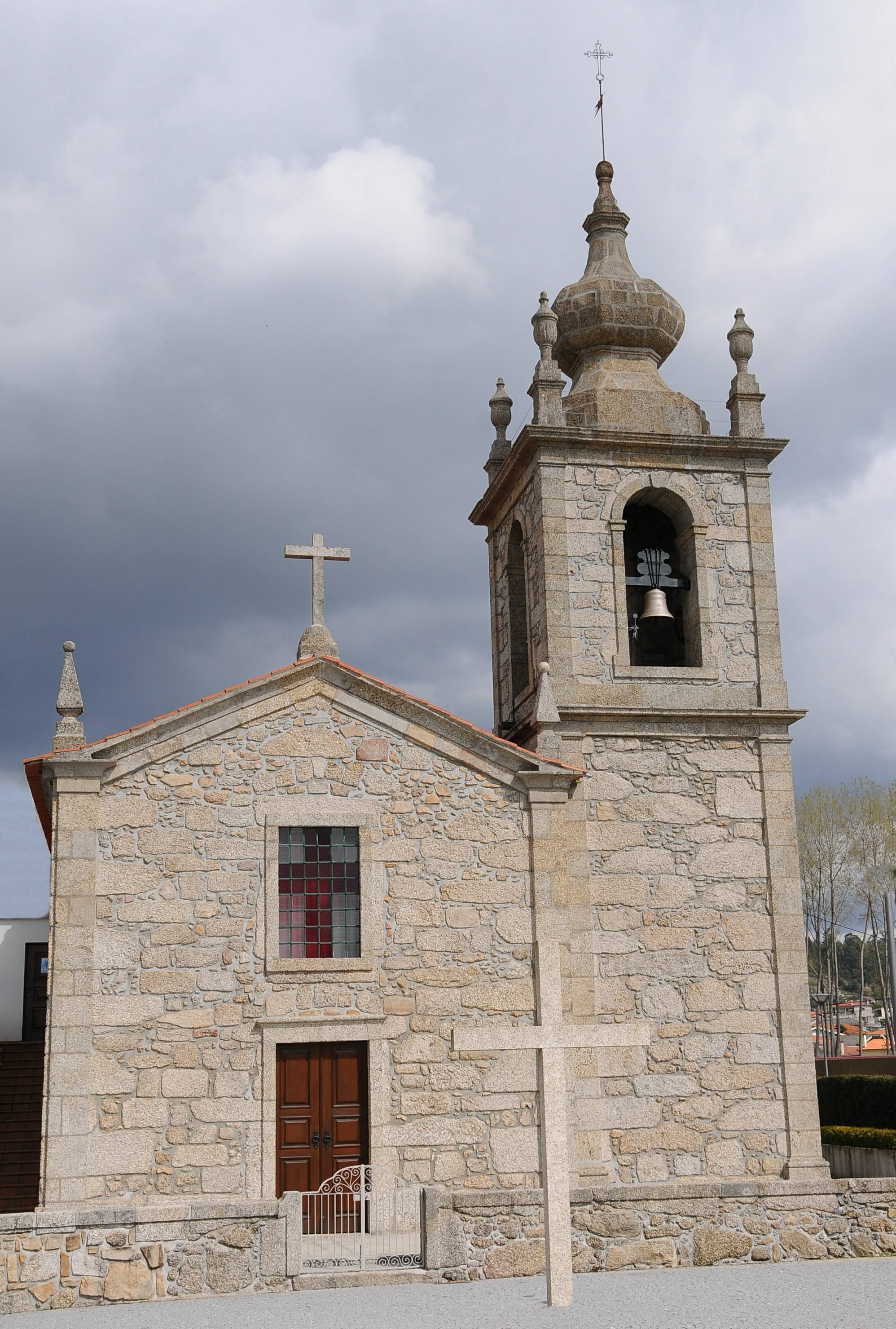
Celeirós Church

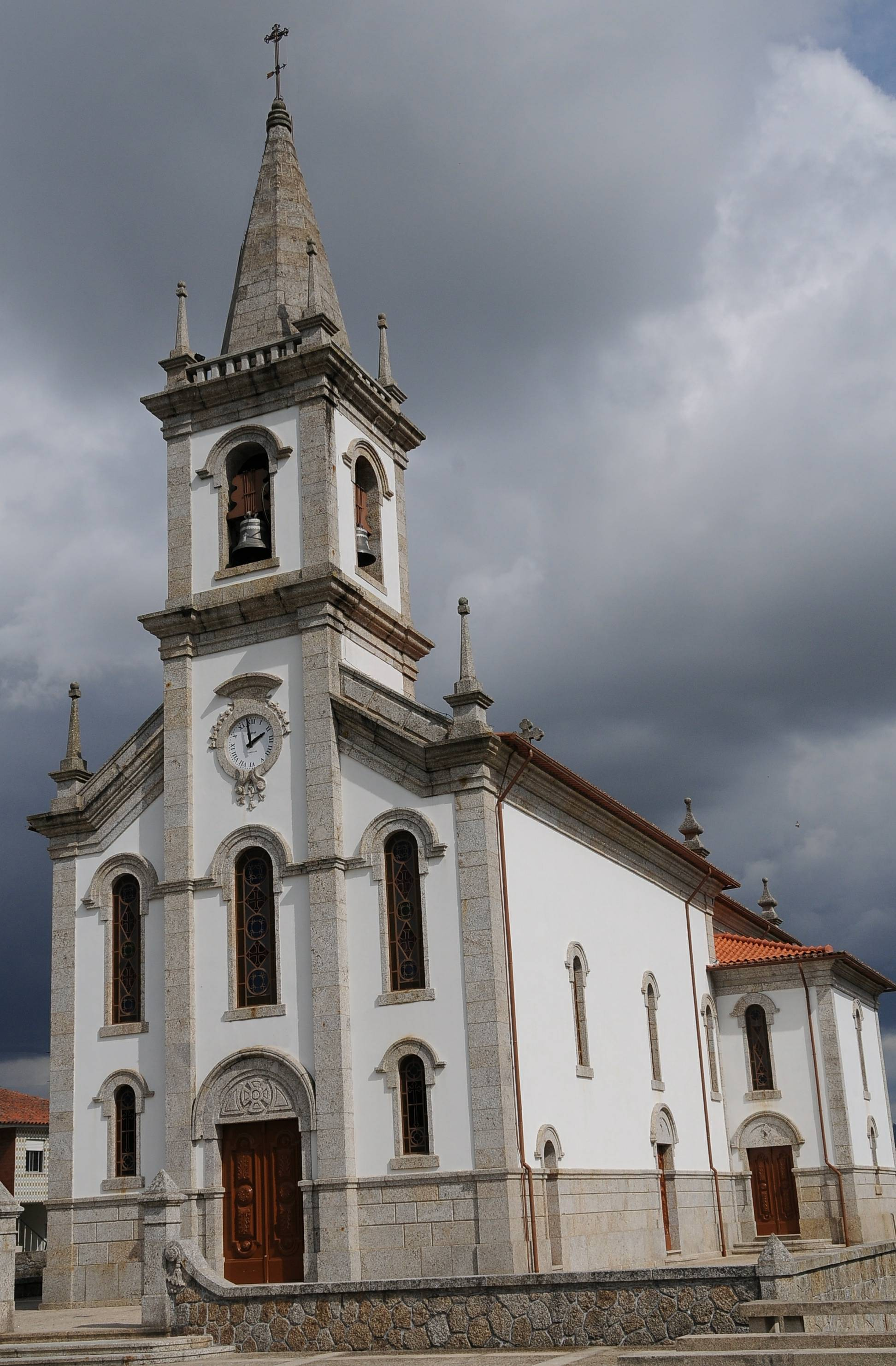
Aveleda Church

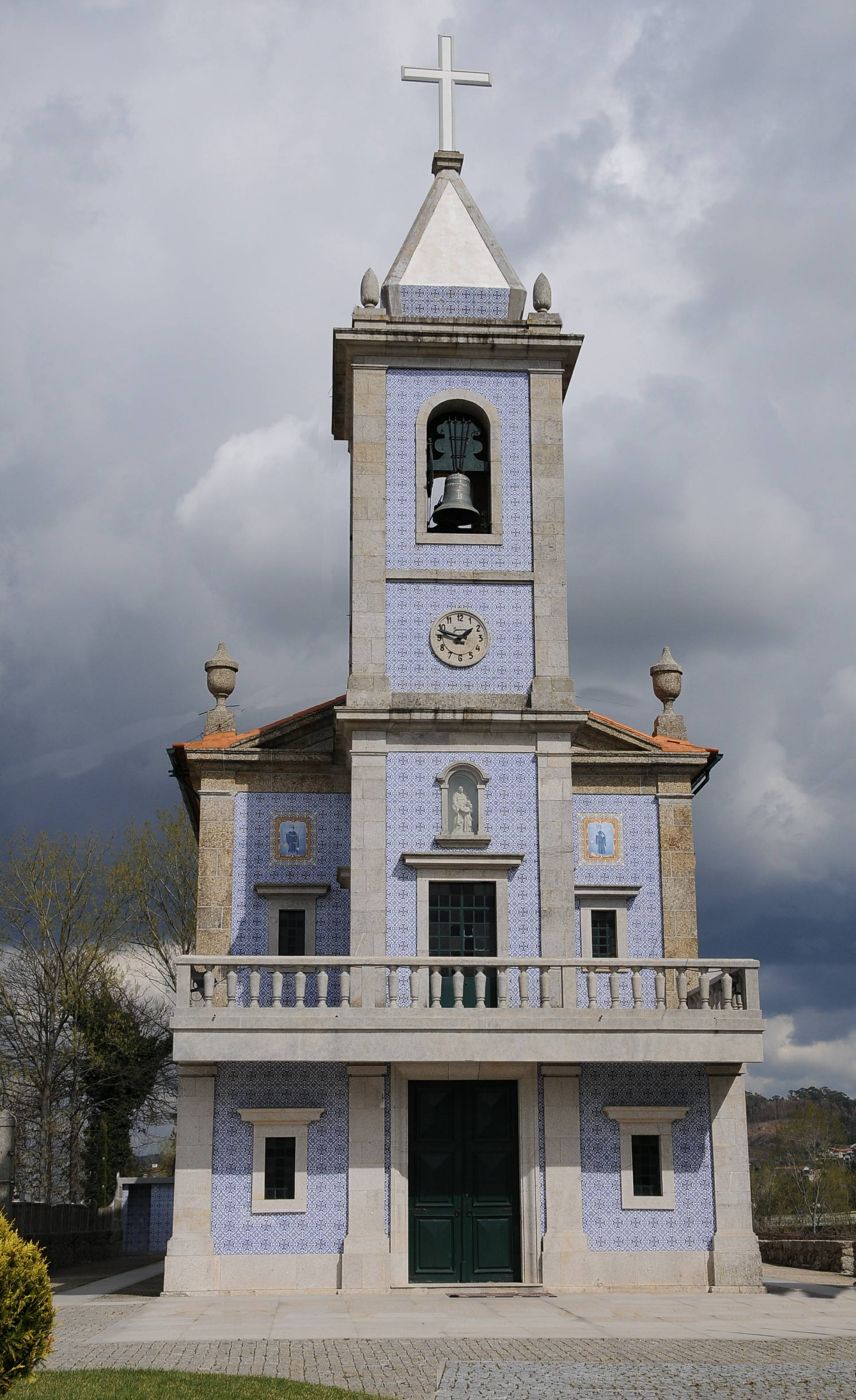
Vimieiro Church
