= Military Order of Saint James of the Sword =

State order of Portugal established in 1175

Military Order of Saint James of the Sword Ordem Militar de Sant'lago da Espada
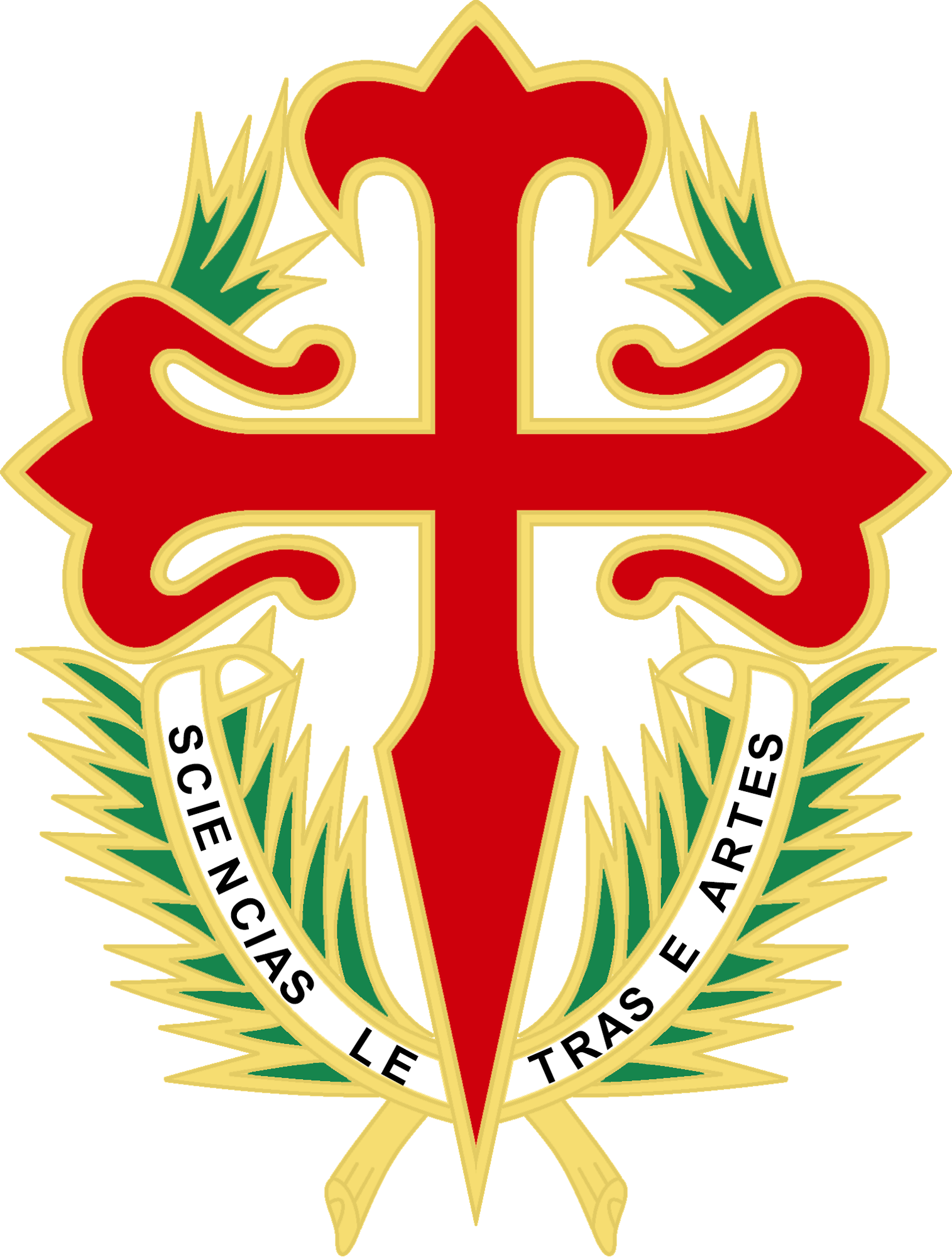
- Emblem of the Order

Awarded by the president of Portugal
- Type: Ancient military order
- Established: July 5, 1175 (founded); 1789 (secularized)
- Country: Portugal
- Ribbon: Violet
- Motto: Ciências, Letras e Artes (Sciences, Letters and Arts)
- Eligibility: Portuguese and foreigners; military and civilian
- Criteria: Exceptional and outstanding merit in literature, science and the arts
- Status: Active
- Grand Master: President of Portugal
- Chancellor: Guilherme d'Oliveira Martins
- Grades: Grand Collar (GColSE); Grand Cross (GCSE); Grand Officer (GOSE); Commander (ComSE); Officer (OSE); Knight (CvSE) / Dame (DmSE)

Precedence
- Next (higher): Military Order of Aviz
- Next (lower): Order of Prince Henry
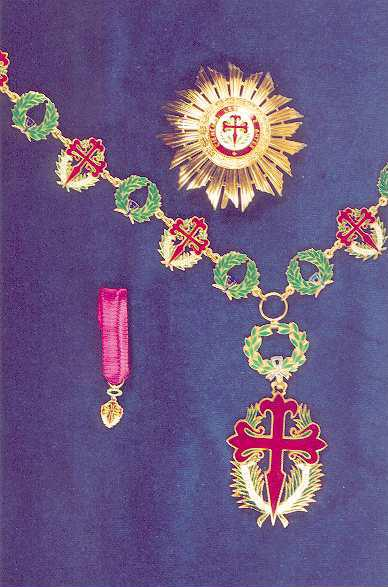
- Insignia of the Order Ribbon bar of the order

The Military Order of Saint James of the Sword (Portuguese: Ordem Militar de Sant'Iago da Espada), formerly known as the Ancient, Most Noble and Enlightened Military Order of Saint James of the Sword, of the Scientific, Literary and Artistic Merit (Antiga, Nobilíssima e Esclarecida Ordem Militar de Sant'Iago da Espada, do Mérito Científico, Literário e Artístico), is one of the four former ancient Portuguese military orders. It was formerly established in 1175 and secularized in 1789.

== History ==
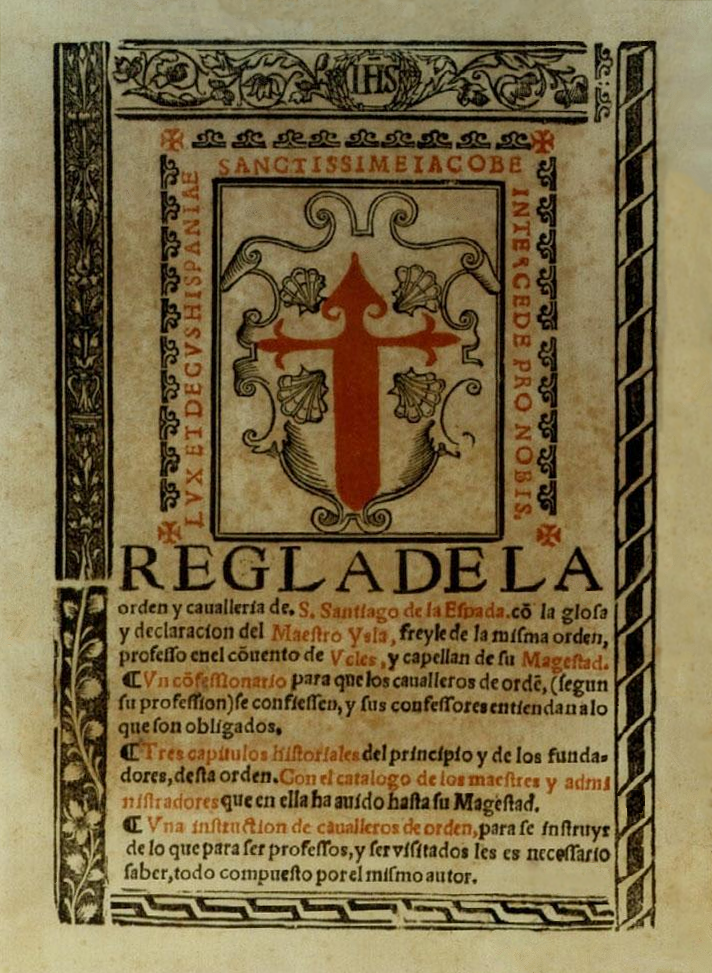
Regla de la orden y cavalleria de S. Santiago de la Espada / co(n) la glosa y declaracion del Maestro Ysla (1547).

The Order was founded in 1172, and has its origins in the Order of Santiago, founded in the Kingdom of León in 1170, probably as an order of Augustinian canons regular to escort pilgrims to the shrine of St. James the Greater in Santiago de Compostela. King Ferdinand II of León soon set it to garrison the southern frontiers of León against the Almohads of al-Andalus. In 1170, Ferdinand II granted the new order the castles of Cáceres and Monfragüe, which had been confiscated from Gerald the Fearless in 1169, and would make further donations thereafter. The new Leonese order was soon operating in neighboring kingdoms. His nephew, King Alfonso VIII of Castile granted them the castles of Mora and Oreja in 1171, and merged the arriving knights of Santiago with the older Castilian brotherhood of knights of Ávila in 1172.

The establishment of the Order of Santiago was endorsed by papal legate Cardinal Hyacinthus of Acardo on a visit to Iberia in 1172–73. The approval of the Order was confirmed three years later by Pope Alexander III in a bull issued July 1175.

In January 1174, Alfonso VIII granted them the citadel of Uclés, which would later serve as the headquarters of the Order of Santiago as a whole after the reunification of the León and Castile in 1230.

The Order expanded into Portugal when King Afonso I of Portugal donated Arruda dos Vinhos in June 1172. This was followed up by donations of the Castle of Monsanto in September 1173 and Abrantes in September 1174. Given the poor relations between Afonso and Ferdinand II, the arrival of the Leonese order in Portugal is a little surprising. Some historians have conjectured Afonso was trying to exploit a quarrel between order's grand master Pedro Fernández and king Ferdinand II, but it is likely that the Order's entry was part of some diplomatic agreement between the two kings. Nonetheless, the donation documents explicitly name Rodrigo Álvarez as the administrator of all three Portuguese donations. Although a founding knight of Santiago, Rodrigo Álvarez was known to be dissatisfied with its rules (Álvarez would resign shortly after and found his own separate Order of Mountjoy in Aragon). So it is possible Afonso may have been trying to encourage a switch or schism in the Order already at this stage. The foundation of the Order of Évora (future Order of Aviz) in 1175/76 reveal Afonso's keen interest in a native Portuguese order.

=== Expulsion from Portugal ===
Whatever the intentions of the original invitation, the knights of Santiago evidently did not meet Afonso's expectations. The Crown took back Monsanto in 1174, and in 1179, Afonso expelled the Order of Santiago from Portugal and cancelled all their donations, as a consequence of a war that erupted between Portugal and León that year.

=== Return to Portugal ===
In 1186, after the death of Afonso I, King Sancho I of Portugal donated to the Order of Santiago the Portuguese dominions of Palmela, Almada and Alcácer do Sal, all in the Setúbal District, south of Lisbon), thus marking their return. But in 1190–91, all three citadels were conquered in an offensive led by the Almohad caliph Yaqub al-Mansur. They were recovered sometime between 1194 and 1204. The Order of Santiago established its Portuguese headquarters at Palmela shortly before 1210, and definitively by 1212.

One of the most notable of Portuguese knights of St. James was Paio Peres Correia. Between 1234 and 1242, Correia led the conquest of much of the southerly Moorish dominions of Baixo Alentejo and the Algarve. In 1242, Paio Peres Correia was elevated to Grand Master of the Order of St. James, the only known Portuguese to have held the supreme title of the Castilian-based Order.

In 1249, Paio Peres Correia and the Order of Santiago helped Afonso III of Portugal sweep up the final Moorish possessions in the Algarve. The possessions of the Order in Portugal were expanded and confirmed by Afonso III in 1255.

=== Portuguese Order of Santiago ===
After the death of Correia in 1275, the Order of Santiago returned firmly into Castilian hands. Thus, in 1288, King Denis of Portugal separated the Portuguese branch from the Castilian-Leonese Order. This was confirmed by Pope John XXII in 1320.

During the 1383–1385 Portuguese succession crisis, D. Fernando Afonso de Albuquerque, master of the Order of Santiago in Portugal, backed the candidacy of John, Master of Aviz, and served briefly as John's ambassador to the English Court.

Upon becoming king, having distributed much royal and seized land to reward his supporters, King John I of Portugal was left with a slim royal demesne, insufficient to maintain his many sons with princely households. But the vast wealthy domains of the military orders were an alternative option. John promptly set his mind on acquiring the masterships of all the principal military orders in Portugal for his family.

In 1418, John secured the mastership of the Order of St. James for his son, John of Reguengos, the future Constable of Portugal. In 1420, he secured the mastership of the Order of Christ (ex-Templars) for another son, Henry the Navigator. After his death in 1433, John I's own Order of Aviz (ex-branch of Calatrava) was passed to a third son, Ferdinand the Saint. The mastership of the three major orders – St. James, Christ and Aviz – would remain in the hands of princes of the royal family (infantes) for much of the next century.

After the death of John of Reguengos in 1442, his brother, the regent prince Peter of Coimbra appointed John's son Diogo as master of Santiago. But Diogo died within a year, so Peter passed the mastership on to his nephew, Infante Ferdinand, Duke of Beja, the younger brother of King Afonso V of Portugal. This was confirmed by Pope Eugene IV in 1444. In the 1452 bull Ex apostolice sedis, Pope Nicholas V confirmed once more Ferdinand's appointment and put a definitive end to questions (up to then still being raised by Castile) about the autonomy of the Portuguese branch of Santiago.

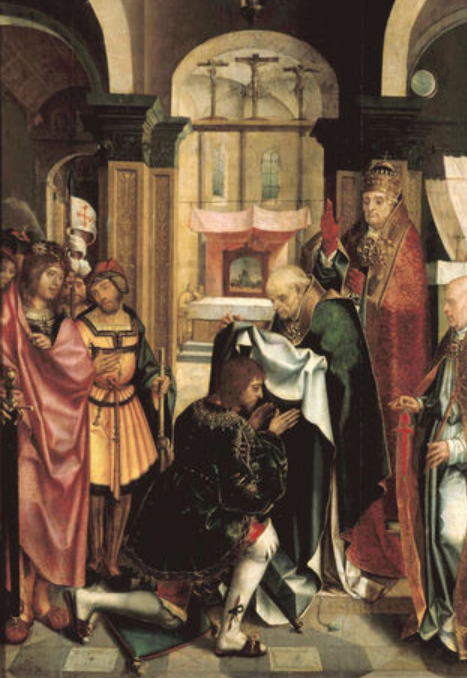
João Fernandes, Lord of Lourinhã, the first Grand-Master of the order

At the death of Henry the Navigator in 1460, his title of Duke of Viseu and the mastership of the Order of Christ passed on to Infante Ferdinand, Henry's designated heir. Ferdinand was in an unusual position of holding two major military orders, but this was ratified by Pope Pius II in 1461.

At Infante Ferdinand's death in 1470, all his titles, including both the orders of Christ and Santiago, were inherited by his eldest son, João, Duke of Viseu. But the sickly João died just two years later, in 1472. The mastership of the orders was subsequently separated again: João's younger brother, Diogo, Duke of Viseu became master of the Order of Christ, while the Order of St. James passed to his brother-in-law, Infante John, the eldest son and heir of Afonso V of Portugal. (John had recently married Infante Ferdinand's daughter, Eleanor of Viseu).

With the ascension of Infante John as King John II of Portugal in 1481, the fortunes of the Order of St. James rose with him. At the time, the Order of Christ, with their vast possessions (including the Atlantic islands), was the richest and most powerful military order in Portugal. To combat their influence, John II, a centralizing prince, doted on and deployed his Order of St. James at their expense.

The Order of Christ had been out of the explorations business since the death of Prince Henry in 1460. As A result, the Order of St. James supplied a greater share of the knights for the slate of new expeditions organized by John II in the 1480s.

The death of John II's only legitimate son and heir Prince Afonso in 1491 threw the kingdom into a succession crisis, as it left John II with only one legitimate successor, his cousin and brother-in-law, Manuel, Duke of Beja. Manuel of Beja had become the master of the Order of Christ in 1484 (following the death of his brother, Diogo of Viseu). John II did not trust Manuel, and suspected he might fritter away his hard-won gains. As a result, John II launched a campaign to legitimize his natural son, Jorge de Lencastre, as royal heir. From Pope Innocent VIII, John II received authorization to appoint Jorge de Lencastre as the Master of the Order of St. James in April 1492 (and also administrator of the Order of Aviz). However, the Pope refused to legitimize his birth, and as a result, at the death of John II in 1495, Duke Manuel of Beja ascended as King Manuel I of Portugal.

In the first decade of Manuel's reign, D. Jorge de Lencastre was the leader of what might be called the political opposition to Manuel, composed mostly of loyalists of the late King John II. The Order of St. James was his power base, and its castle in Palmela served as something akin to an 'alternative' royal court.

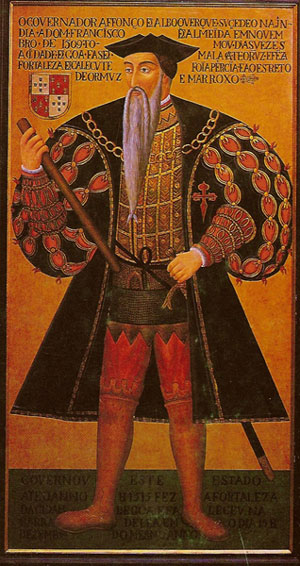
Afonso de Albuquerque, Portuguese Governor of the Indies (1509–1515), wearing a cloak with the cross of the Order of Santiago

The Order of Santiago played a leading role in the early India expeditions, a legacy project from the reign of John II. Vasco da Gama, Paulo da Gama, D. Francisco de Almeida, D. Afonso de Albuquerque and Duarte de Meneses, were leading knights of the Order of Santiago.

It is reported by chronicler João de Barros (p. 274) that just before his departure for India in 1497, King Manuel I of Portugal presented Vasco da Gama with his personal standard – not the familiar armillary sphere flag later associated with Manuel, but rather the banner of the Order of Christ, of which Manuel was the grand master. But chronicler Gaspar Correia (p. 15) reports that as soon as the ships left sight of Lisbon harbor, Paulo da Gama pulled 'the royal standard' down from the mast. Evidently the Gamas took the king's gesture as a calculated slight against their beloved Santiago.

Nonetheless, in subsequent years Manuel I would set his Order of Christ to poach the knights of the Order of St. James. In January, 1505, Manuel managed to coax D. Francisco de Almeida to abandon Santiago and move over to the Order of Christ. Vasco da Gama himself eventually did the switch in 1507. Afonso de Albuquerque, by contrast, refused; he was buried in his Santiago vestments.

Master Jorge de Lencastre spent much of his career trying to defend the Order of Santiago against Manuel's encroachments. In May 1505, he actually managed to secure a royal order prohibiting knights from leaving his orders without his express permission. But Manuel soon obtained from Pope Alexander VI two bulls to undermine him – one from July 1505, giving the King of Portugal the right to dispose of the property of all three Orders; another in January, 1506, authorizing knights to move freely from other Orders to the Order of Christ.

In 1509, D. Jorge de Lencastre introduced a new set of rules for the Order of Santiago, overhauling its administration in a centralized fashion, bringing it closer in line with the rules of their Spanish brethren. This was done perhaps to gain the support of the Spanish monarchy and the Pope, but to no avail. In 1516, Manuel secured from Pope Leo X the authority to appoint Jorge's successor as grand master of Santiago.

=== As a royal order ===
Manuel died in 1521, and he was succeeded by his son John III of Portugal. When Jorge de Lencastre died in July 1550, John III received a bull from Pope Julius III a couple of weeks later appointing him personally as the master of both the Order of Santiago and the Order of Aviz. This was followed by a second bull, Praeclara carissimi, issued by the pope under great diplomatic pressure by John III in December 1551, appointing the Kings of Portugal as masters in perpetuity of all three military orders (Christ, Santiago and Aviz), thus bringing an end to the independence of the military orders in Portugal.

=== Secularization ===
Pope Pius VI (1789) and Queen Maria I reformed the order into a secular institution.

=== As an order of merit ===
In 1834, when the civil government of Portugal became anti-clerical after the defeat of King Miguel in the Civil War, under the constitutional monarchy, the order lost its properties. The ancient military orders were transformed by the liberal constitution and subsequent legislation into mere orders of merit. The privileges which once had been an essential part of the membership of the old military orders also ceased.

In 1910, when the Portuguese monarchy ended, the Republic of Portugal abolished all of the orders except the Military Order of the Tower and Sword.

== Revival ==
In 1917, at the end of World War I, some of these Orders were re-established to reward outstanding services to the state, the office of Grand Master belonging to the Head of State – the President of the Republic. The Military Order of St. James, together with the other Portuguese Orders of Merit, had its statutes revised on several occasions, during the First Republic (1910–1926), then in 1962, and again in 1986.

The Military Order of Saint James, together with the Military Orders of Christ and of Aviz, form the group of the "Ancient Military Orders", governed by a Chancellor and a Council of eight members, appointed by the President of the Republic, to assist him as Grand Master in all matters concerning the administration of the Order. The Order, despite its name, can be conferred to Portuguese and foreigners for outstanding services to science, literature or art. The highest grade of the Order, that of Grand Collar, is a special award, conferred only to foreign heads of state.

== Domains ==
The Order of Santiago possessed many domains granted by the Portuguese Crown, almost all of them south of the Tagus river, clustered in the Sado region and lower Alentejo. As the most southerly of the four Portuguese military orders, the Santiago knights were the first frontline against incursions from the Moorish Algarve in the 13th century. These domains were partitioned into comendas, and granted by the Order in commendam to a Santiago knight (comendador) entrusted with the obligation of defending them. After the completion of the conquest of the Algarve, the comendas continued to be a source of revenue for the Order, granted to distinguished individual knights of the Order, still contingent on military service, and run according to the Order's regulations. In principle, the comendador was just a temporary manager of the Order's property, although over time some comendadors treated the comenda as their own property.

The vast size and compactness of the domains of the Order of Santiago, its self-contained system of knights and comendas, and the extensive privileges of the Order, including civil and criminal jurisdiction, over these domains, has led some commentators to refer to it as a "state within a state". The grand masters of the Order were among the most powerful men in Portugal, and comendadors stood at the peak of rural society in their districts.

By the 15th century the large comendas of the Order of Santiago were (from north to south): Arruda and Santos (both north of the river), then Palmela, Setúbal, Sesimbra, Cabrela, Alcácer do Sal, Torrão, Grândola, Ferreira, Santiago do Cacém, Sines, Aljustrel, Messejana, Casével, Garvão, Castro Verde, Mértola, Almodôvar, and (on the southeast Algarve coast) Cacela.

== Grades ==
The Order of St. James of the Sword, as awarded by the Portuguese government today, comes in six classes:

- Grand Collar (GColSE), which wears the badge of the Order on a special collar (chain), and the star of the Order in gold on the left chest;
- Grand Cross (GCSE), which wears the badge of the Order on a gilt collar (chain), or on a sash on the right shoulder, and the star of the Order in gold on the left chest;
- Grand Officer (GOSE), which wears the badge of the Order on a gilt collar (chain), and the star of the Order in gold on the left chest;
- Commander (ComSE), which wears the badge of the Order on a gilt collar (chain), and the star of the Order in silver on the left chest;
- Officer (OSE), which wears the badge of the Order on a gilt collar (chain), and on a ribbon with rosette on the left chest;
- Knight (CavSE) or Dame (DamSE), which wears the badge of the Order on a silver collar (chain), and on a plain ribbon on the left chest.

Ribbon bars
Grand Collar (GCollSE)	Grand Cross (GCSE)	Grand Officer (GOSE)	Commander (ComSE)	Officer (OSE)	Knight (CavSE) / Dame (DamSE)

== Insignia ==
The insignia of the order prominently features the Cross of St. James.

- The badge of the Order is a gilt cross with red enamel, similar to the Order's emblem illustrated here, but with a longer lower arm, and is surrounded by a wreath of green-enamelled palm leaves; a white-enamelled scroll, bearing the legend "Ciência Letras e Artes" (Science Literature and Art), is located at the bottom of the badge. (The Grand Collar badge has no scroll, and a laurel wreath instead of palms.) During the monarchy the badge was topped by the Sacred Heart of Christ.
- The star of the Order has 22 asymmetrical arms of rays, in gilt for Grand Collar, Grand Cross and Grand Officer, and in silver for Commander. The central disc is in white enamel, with a miniature of the modern badge in it. During the monarchy the Sacred Heart of Christ was placed at the top of the star.
- The ribbon of the Order is plain lilac.

== See also ==
- Orders, decorations, and medals of Portugal

== Bibliography ==
- Blanco, Enrique Gallego (1971). The Rule of the Spanish Military Order of St. James. E.J.Brill.
- de Albuquerque, Afonso (1557). Commentarios Dafonso Dalboquerque, capitam geral & gouernador da India (in Spanish). "1774 Port. ed. trans. 1875–84 by Walter de Gray Birch, as The Commentaries of the great Afonso Dalboquerque, second viceroy of India, 4 volumes, London: Hakluyt Society"
- de Barros, João. Décadas da Ásia: Dos feitos, que os Portuguezes fizeram no descubrimento, e conquista, dos mares, e terras do Oriente (1552–59).
- Correia, Gaspar (1550). Lendas da Índia. "first pub. 1858–64"
- Fonseca, L.A. (2008). "The Portuguese Military Orders and the Oceanic Navigations: From Piracy to Empire (Fifteenth to Early Sixteenth Centuries)". In J. M. Upton-Ward (ed.). The Military Orders Volume IV: On Land and by Sea. Aldershot: Ashgate. pp. 81–92. doi:10.4324/9781315555553-18. ISBN 9781315555553.
- Mattoso, Jose (2007). D. Afonso Henriques. Lisbon: Circulo de Leitores. pp. 223–230. doi:10.4000/lerhistoria.2041.
- Olival, Fernanda (2018). The Military Orders and the Portuguese Expansion (15th to 17th Centuries. Portuguese Studies Review Monograph Series. Vol. 3. Peterborough: Baywolf Press and The Portuguese Studies Review. ISBN 9780921437543.
- Oliveira Marques, A.H.; Alves Dias, J.J. (2003). Atlas Historico de Portugal e do Ultramar Portugues (in Portuguese). Lisbon: Universidade Nova.
- Subrahmanyam, S. (1997). The Career and Legend of Vasco da Gama. Cambridge, UK: Cambridge University Press. ISBN 9780521646291.
- Tagore, Sourindro Mohun (1884). The orders of knighthood, British and foreign. Catholic Orphan Press.
