= Infante Ferdinand, Duke of Guarda =

Infante Ferdinand
- Duke of Guarda
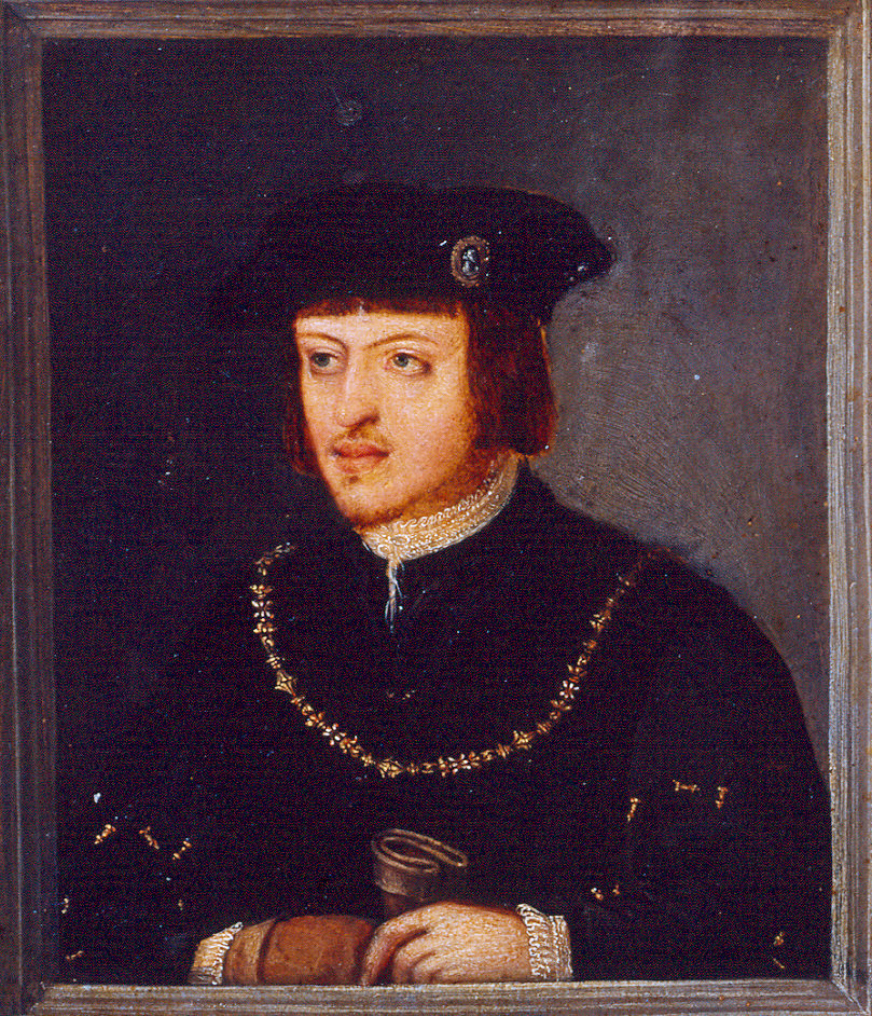
- Born: 5 June 1507; Abrantes, Kingdom of Portugal
- Died: 7 November 1534 (aged 27); Abrantes, Kingdom of Portugal
- Burial: Church of Saint Dominique of Abrantes
- Spouse: Guiomar Coutinho
- Issue: Infanta Luisa
- House: Aviz
- Father: Manuel I of Portugal
- Mother: Maria of Aragon

Ferdinand of Portugal, Duke of Guarda (Portuguese: Fernando, Portuguese pronunciation: [fɨɾˈnɐ̃du]; 5 June 1507 – 7 November 1534) was a Portuguese infante (prince), the son of King Manuel I of Portugal and his second wife, Maria of Aragon.

== Biography ==
Ferdinand was born in Abrantes on 5 June 1507. He was Lord of Alfaiates, Sabugal and Abrantes, and Mayor of Trancoso, Lamego and Marialva. Ferdinand was friends with the renowned Portuguese intellectual Damião de Góis.

On 5 October 1530, Ferdinand was made Duke of Guarda by his brother, John III. He married Guiomar Coutinho, 5th Countess of Marialva and 3rd Countess of Loulé, a rich heiress from a Portuguese noble family. The marriage was arranged by John III. The couple settled in Abrantes, where their two children were born: a daughter, Luisa (born in 1531), and a son, born on 1 August 1533, who died shortly after his birth.

Luisa, his only surviving child, died in October 1534. Ferdinand himself died one month later, on 7 November 1534, in Abrantes. He is buried in the Church of Saint Dominique of Abrantes. His widow, Guiomar Coutinho, died one month later, on 9 December.

== Ancestry ==
Ancestors of Infante Ferdinand, Duke of Guarda

8. Edward I of Portugal
4. Ferdinand, Duke of Viseu
9. Eleanor of Aragon
2. Manuel I of Portugal
10. John, Constable of Portugal
5. Beatrice of Portugal
11. Isabel of Barcelos
1. Ferdinand, Duke of Guarda
12. John II of Aragon
6. Ferdinand II of Aragon
13. Juana Enríquez
3. Maria of Aragon
14. John II of Castile
7. Isabella I of Castile
15. Isabella of Portugal

== See also ==
- Duke of Guarda
- Count of Loulé
- Count of Marialva
- Descendants of Manuel I of Portugal

Infante Ferdinand, Duke of Guarda House of Aviz Cadet branch of the House of Burgundy Born: 1507 Died: 1534
Portuguese nobility
New title	Duke of Guarda; 1530–1534	Title extinct
