= João, Duke of Viseu =

Constable of Portugal (c. 1448–1472)

João
- constable of Portugal
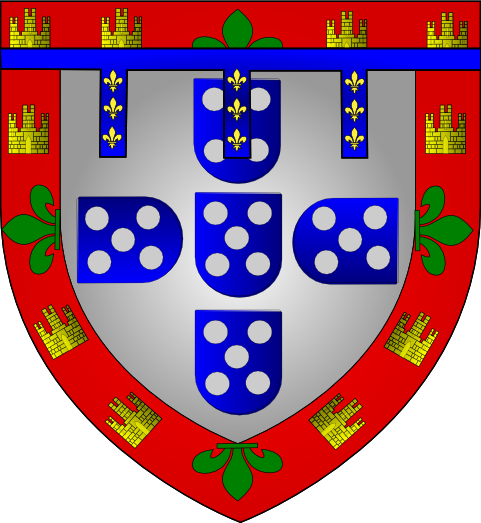

Duke of Beja and Viseu
- Reign: 1470 - 1472
- Predecessor: Ferdinand, Duke of Viseu
- Successor: Diogo, Duke of Viseu
- Born: c. 1448
- Died: 1472
- House: Aviz
- Father: Ferdinand, Duke of Viseu
- Mother: Beatriz of Portugal

Infante João of Viseu (c. 1448 – 1472) was the older son of Infante Fernando, Duke of Viseu and of his wife Infanta Beatrice of Portugal.

In 1470, following his father's death, he inherited the titles of Duke of Viseu and Duke of Beja, as well as the Lordships of Covilhã and Moura.

He also became Master of the Order of Christ and of the Order of Santiago, becoming also Constable of Portugal.

In July 1472, his uncle, King Afonso V granted him the Moroccan city of Anfa (in Portuguese Anafé).

He died young and single, without issue. His brother, Infante Diogo, inherited his titles and estates.

== Ancestry ==
Ancestors of João, Duke of Viseu

8. John I of Portugal
4. Edward I of Portugal
9. Philippa of Lancaster
2. Ferdinand, Duke of Viseu
10. Ferdinand I of Aragon
5. Eleanor of Aragon
11. Eleanor of Alburquerque
1. João, Duke of Viseu
12. John I of Portugal (= 8)
6. John, Constable of Portugal
13. Philippa of Lancaster (= 9)
3. Beatrice of Portugal
14. Afonso I, Duke of Braganza
7. Isabel of Barcelos
15. Beatriz Pereira de Alvim

== See also ==
- Duke of Beja
- Duke of Viseu
- Dukedoms in Portugal

== Bibliography ==
- ”Nobreza de Portugal e do Brasil” – Vol. II, page 409. Published by Zairol Lda., Lisbon 1989.

João, Duke of Viseu House of Aviz Cadet branch of the House of Burgundy Born: ? 1448 Died: ? 1472
Portuguese nobility
Preceded by Infante Fernando	Duke of Beja; 1470—1472	Succeeded by Infante Diogo
Preceded by Infante Fernando	Duke of Viseu; 1470—1472	Succeeded by Infante Diogo
