= Beatriz of Portugal, Duchess of Viseu =

Duchess of Viseu (1430–1506)

Infanta Beatrice
- Duchess of Viseu
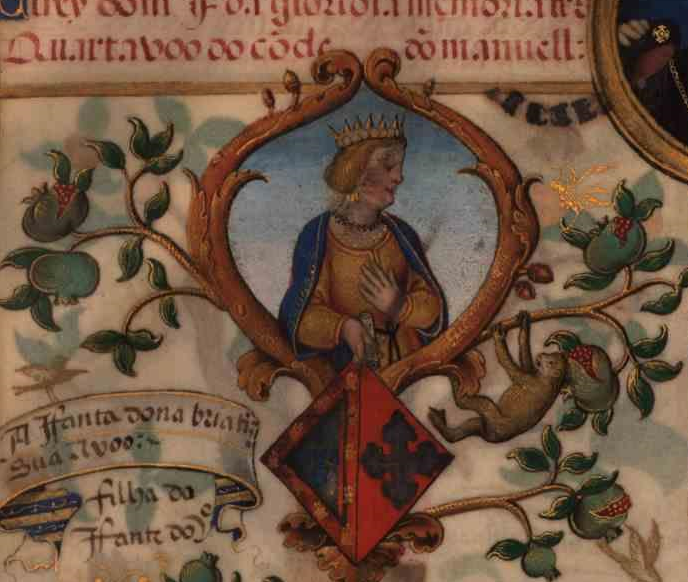
- Born: 13 June 1430
- Died: 30 September 1506 (aged 76)
- Spouse: Infante Fernando, Duke of Viseu
- Issue: John, Duke of Viseu; Diogo, Duke of Viseu; Eleanor, Queen of Portugal; Isabella, Duchess of Braganza; Manuel I of Portugal
- House: Aviz
- Father: John, Constable of Portugal
- Mother: Isabella of Barcelos

Infanta Beatriz of Portugal (13 June 1430 – 30 September 1506) was a Portuguese infanta, daughter of John, Constable of Portugal (fourth son of King John I of Portugal and his wife Philippa of Lancaster), and Isabella of Barcelos, a daughter of Afonso I, Duke of Braganza.

== Biography ==
Due to the Aviz dynasty marriage policy, Beatrice was first cousin and sister-in-law of king Afonso V of Portugal, first cousin once removed and mother-in-law of king John II of Portugal, first cousin and mother-in-law of Ferdinand II, 3rd Duke of Braganza and mother of king Manuel I of Portugal, playing an active role in politics during the consecutive reigns of Afonso V, John II and Manuel I.

Through her sister Isabella, wife of John II of Castile, she was an aunt of Isabella I of Castile, helping to settle both the Treaty of Alcáçovas and the Treaty of Terçarias de Moura between the Kingdom of Portugal and the Kingdom of Castile, after meeting with her niece Isabella in person.

She was also predominant in the Order of Santiago, acting as tutor for her son Diogo.

Infanta Beatrice protected and encouraged Gil Vicente, a Portuguese playwright, considered as the father of the Portuguese theatre.

She founded the Religiosas da Conceição monastery, in Beja, where her husband was buried.

=== Marriage and children ===
In 1447, Beatrice married her cousin Infante Ferdinand (Portuguese: Fernando), 2nd Duke of Viseu, son of King Edward of Portugal (her uncle). From this marriage, they had nine children:

- Infante João (1448–1472), 3rd Duke of Viseu, 2nd Duke of Beja, 7th Constable of Portugal;
- Infante Diogo (1450–1484), 4th Duke of Viseu, 3rd Duke of Beja;
- Infanta Eleanor of Viseu (1458–1525), married to King John II of Portugal, becoming Queen of Portugal;
- Infanta Isabella of Viseu (1459–1521), married to Ferdinand II, Duke of Braganza;
- Infante Duarte of Viseu (1462–1476 or after);
- Infante Simão of Viseu (died in 1465/1470);
- Infanta Catarina of Viseu (1465–bef.1470);
- Infante Dinis of Viseu (1468–bef.1470);
- Infante Manuel (1469–1521), 5th Duke of Viseu, 4th Duke of Beja. Became King of Portugal, as Manuel I, following his cousin's (John II) death.

== Ancestry ==
Ancestors of Beatriz of Portugal, Duchess of Viseu

16. Afonso IV of Portugal
8. Peter I of Portugal
17. Beatrice of Castile
4. John I of Portugal
18. Lourenço Martins
9. Teresa Lourenço
19. Sancha Martins
2. John, Constable of Portugal
20. Edward III of England
10. John of Gaunt, 1st Duke of Lancaster
21. Philippa of Hainault
5. Philippa of Lancaster
22. Henry of Grosmont, 1st Duke of Lancaster
11. Blanche of Lancaster
23. Isabel of Beaumont
1. Beatriz of Portugal
24. Peter I of Portugal (= 8)
12. John I of Portugal (= 4)
25. Teresa Lourenço (= 9)
6. Afonso I, Duke of Braganza
26. Pero Esteves, o Barbadão
13. Inês Pires
27. Maria Anes
3. Isabel of Barcelos
28. Álvaro Gonçalves Pereira, Prior of Crato
14. Nuno Álvares Pereira, 7th Count of Barcelos
29. Iria Gonçalves do Carvalhal
7. Beatriz Pereira de Alvim
30. João Pires de Alvim
15. Leonor Anes de Alvim
31. Branca Pires Coelho

== See also ==
- Duke of Beja
- Duke of Viseu
- Dukedoms in Portugal

== Bibliography ==
- ”Nobreza de Portugal e do Brasil” – Vol. I, page 298 and 312. Published by Zairol Lda., Lisbon 1989.
