= Order of Saint James =

Order of Saint James may refer to the following Orders of knighthood :

- Order of Santiago, also known as the Military Order of Santiago, a Catholic chivalric order and monarchical order founded in Castile
- Military Order of Saint James of the Sword, a Catholic chivalric order, founded in Portugal
- Order of St. James of Lucca, Catholic, suppressed in favor of the military Order of Our Lady of Bethlehem for the defence of the Greek island of Lemnos
