= House of Aviz =

Portuguese royal dynasty

House of Aviz Casa de Avis
- Arms of the House of Aviz
- Parent house: Portuguese House of Burgundy
- Country: Kingdom of Portugal
- Founded: 1385; 641 years ago
- Founder: John I
- Final ruler: Henry I or António I (disputed)
- Titles: King of Portugal; King of Aragon (Claimed); King of the Algarve; Prince of Antioch (Titular); Duke of Viseu; Duke of Beja; Duke of Coimbra; Duke of Guarda; Duke of Guimarães; Lord of Ceuta; Lord of Alcácer; Lord of Guinea
- Dissolution: 1580; 446 years ago or 1583; 443 years ago (disputed)
- Cadet branches: House of Coimbra; House of Lancaster; House of Braganza; House of Brazil; House of Brazil-Saxe-Coburg-Gotha; House of Orleans-Brazil; House of Cadaval; House of Lavradio; House of Abrantes

The House of Aviz (Portuguese: Casa de Avis [ɐˈviʃ]), also known as the Joanine Dynasty (Dinastia Joanina), was a royal dynasty of Portuguese origin which flourished during the Renaissance and the period of the Portuguese discoveries, when Portugal expanded its power globally.

The house was founded by King John I of Portugal, Grand-Master of the Order of Aviz and illegitimate son of King Pedro I (of the Portuguese House of Burgundy), who ascended to the throne after successfully pressing his claim during the 1383–1385 Portuguese interregnum. Aviz monarchs ruled Portugal through the Age of Discovery, establishing Portugal as a global power following the creation of the Portuguese Empire. In 1494, Pope Alexander VI divided the world under the dominion of Portugal and Spain with the Treaty of Tordesillas.

The House of Aviz has produced numerous prominent figures in both European and global history, including Prince Henry the Navigator, King Manuel I of Portugal, and Holy Roman Empress Isabella of Portugal. Numerous Aviz dynasts have also claimed thrones or titles across Europe, including John, Prince of Antioch. The Aviz ruled Portugal from 1385 until 1580, when the Philippine Dynasty succeeded to the throne following the Portuguese succession crisis of 1580.

== History ==
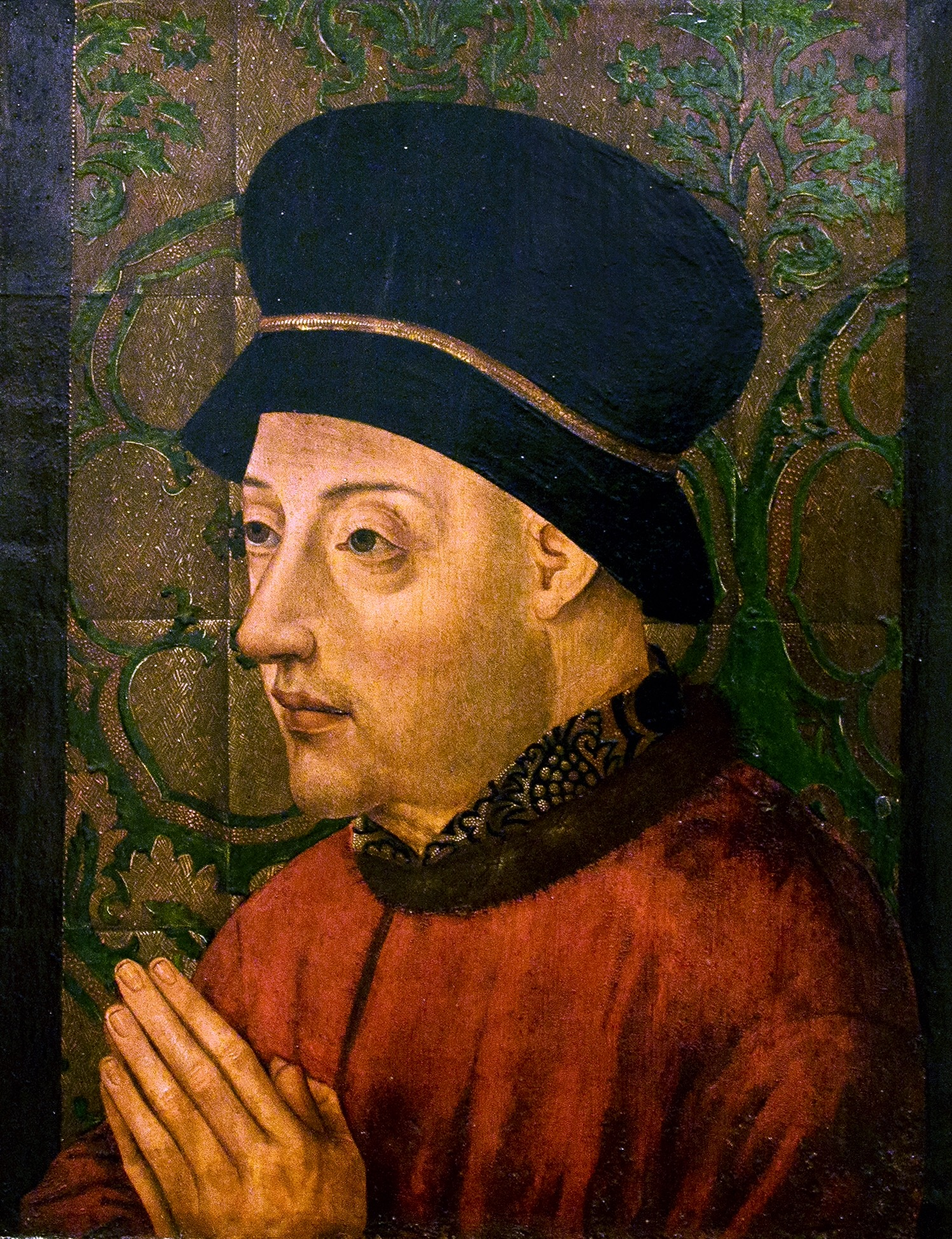
King John I of Portugal, founder of the House of Aviz.

=== Origins ===
The founder of the House of Aviz, King John I of Portugal, was born in 1357 as the illegitimate child of King Pedro I of Portugal, a member of the Portuguese House of Burgundy, and Teresa Lourenço, daughter of a Lisbon merchant. In 1364, at 7 years old, John was made Grand Master of the Order of Aviz, henceforth becoming known as John of Aviz.

=== Rise to the throne ===
The House of Aviz was established as a result of the dynastic crisis following the 1383 death of Ferdinand I. Ferdinand's widow Leonor Telles was disliked by both the nobility and the commoners for having left her first husband and for having had their marriage annulled in order to marry King Ferdinand. Ferdinand's designated heir was their only surviving child Beatrice, married to John I of Castile who claimed the throne in the name of his wife, but under the Treaty of Salvaterra that had been the basis for John's marriage to Beatrice, the unpopular Leonor was left as Regent until such time as the son of Beatrice and John would be 14 years old.

In April 1385, amidst popular revolt and civil war, the Cortes of Coimbra declared John, Master of Aviz, as king John I of Portugal. He was half-brother of Ferdinand and natural son of Ferdinand's father and predecessor Pedro I. He had the particular backing of the rising bourgeoisie of Lisbon; the nobility were split, with the majority favoring the legitimist Beatrice. Troops under General Nuno Álvares Pereira defeated a small Castilian army at Atoleiros, while John of Castile had to lift a siege to Lisboa, mainly due to a plague that hit his army and killed his wife Beatrice. This was followed, however, by a larger invasion of Castilian and Portuguese troops loyal to John of Castile.

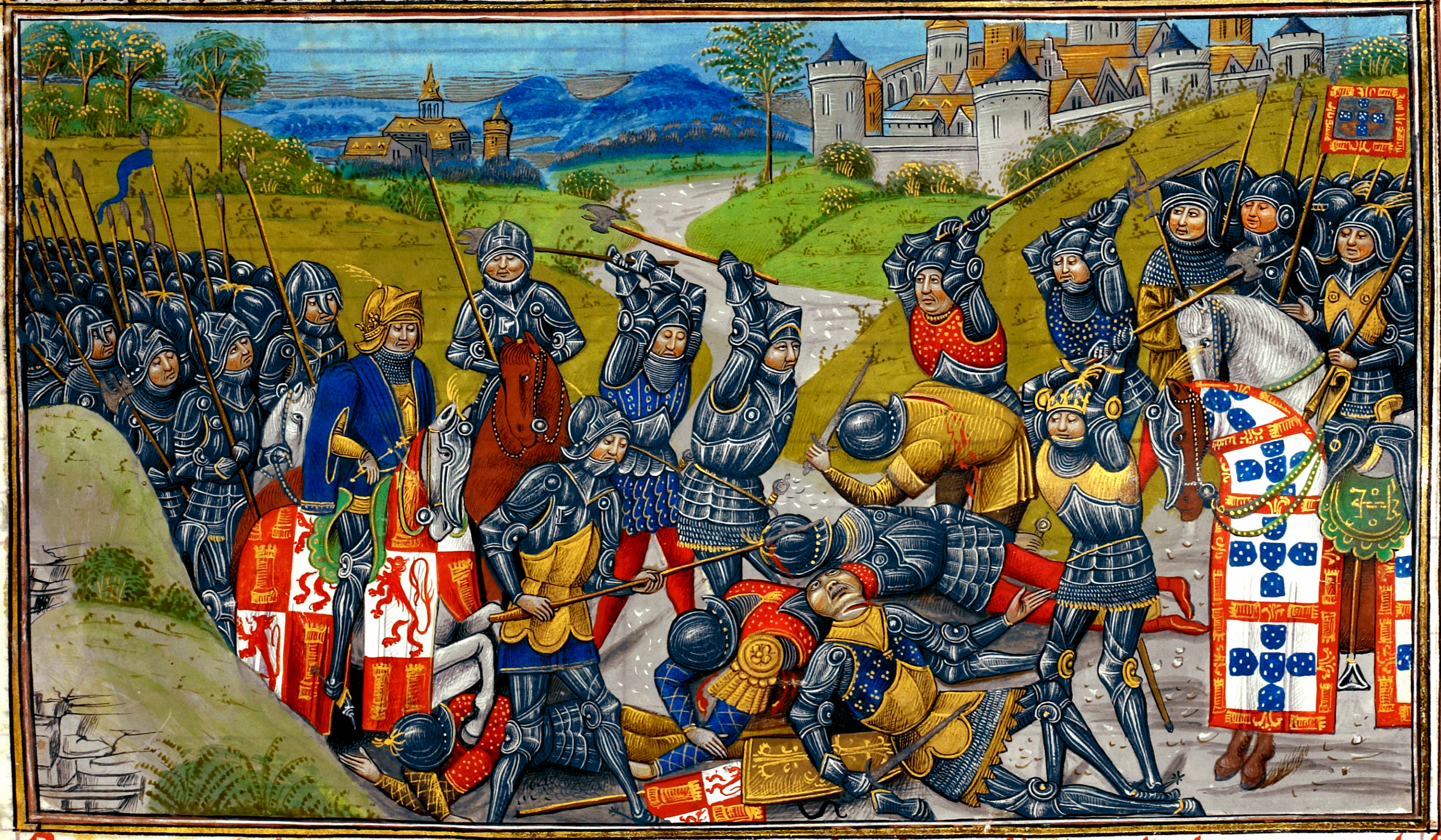
The House of Aviz became Portugal's reigning dynasty following the Battle of Aljubarrota in 1385.

John of Aviz's rule became established fact with the Portuguese victory in the Battle of Aljubarrota on 14 August 1385, where he defeated John I of Castile. A formal peace between Portugal and Castile would not be signed until 1411.

To mark his victory, John founded the Monastery of Santa Maria da Vitória, known as the "Batalha Monastery" ("Battle Monastery"), whose chapel became the burial place of the princes of the new dynasty of Aviz. The descendants of King John I were still also Masters of Aviz, though at times that title passed to one descendant of John and the Crown of Portugal to another. The title of Grand Master of the Order of Aviz was permanently incorporated into the Portuguese Crown toward the end of rule by the House of Aviz, in 1551.

=== Age of Discoveries ===
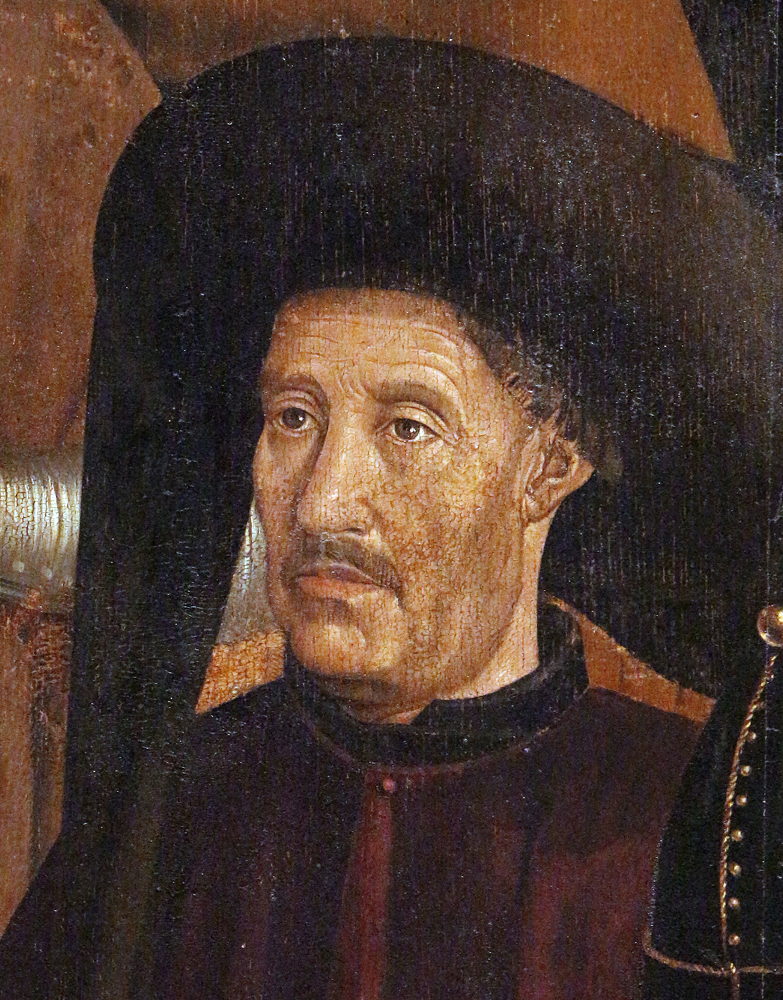
Prince Henry the Navigator, famed leader of the Age of Discoveries and prince of the House of Aviz.

The House of Aviz would rule Portugal until its fall in the 1580 to the Philippine Dynasty. after he had ordered the Duke of Alba to take Portugal by force.

This period of Portuguese history saw the ascent of Portugal to the status of a European and world power. The conquest of Ceuta in 1415 was its first venture in colonial expansion, followed by a great outpouring of national energy and capital investment in the exploration of Africa, Asia and Brazil with the founding of colonies to exploit their resources commercially. The period also includes the zenith of the Portuguese Empire during the reign of Manuel I and the beginning of its decline during John III's reign.

=== Fall of the Aviz ===
John III was succeeded in 1557 by his grandson Sebastian I of Portugal, who died, aged 24 and childless, in the Battle of Alcácer Quibir. Sebastian was succeeded by his great-uncle Henry, aged 66, who, as a Catholic Cardinal, also had no children. The Cardinal-King Henry died two years later, and a succession crisis occurred when pretenders to the throne including Catherine, Duchess of Braganza, Philip II of Spain, and António, Prior of Crato claimed the right to inherit it.

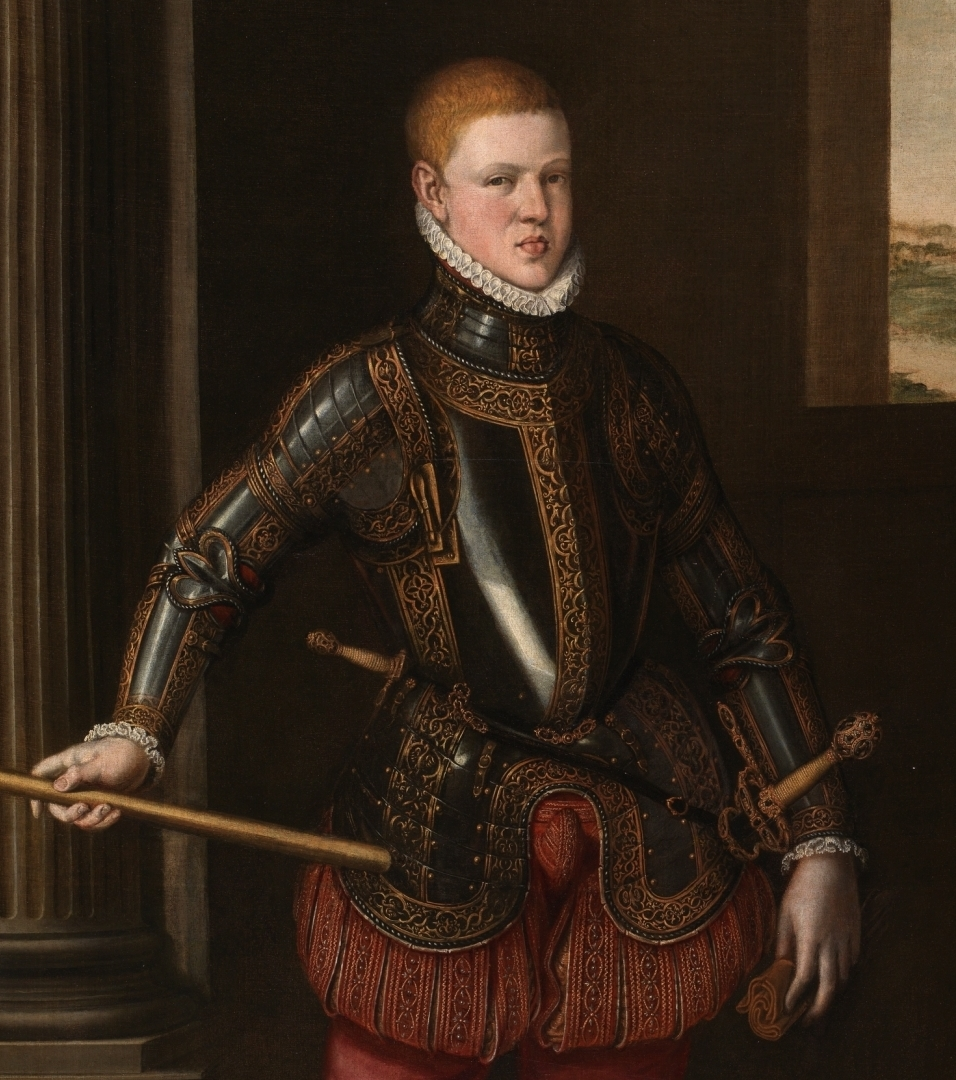
The death of King Sebastian I of Portugal at the Battle of Alcácer Quibir in 1578 led to the Portuguese succession crisis of 1580.

António, Prior of Crato, was acclaimed king in several cities around the country in 1580, twenty days before Philip II of Spain invaded Portugal and defeated the supporters of António in the Battle of Alcântara. Although António had been proclaimed king, and was still regarded as rightful king in some of the Azores Islands until 1583, his legitimacy as a monarch is still disputed by historians. Only a small minority of historians (even in Portugal) accept the period of twenty days between Anthony's acclamation and the Battle of Alcântara as his reign. In Portugal he generally considered not as a national king, but as a patriot who led armed resistance to the Philippine domination.

Joaquim Veríssimo Serrão, writing in 1956 and counting António as a king, dates the end of the dynasty's rule of Portugal as occurring in 1581–1582. The Cortes of Tomar had acclaimed Philip II of Spain as Philip I of Portugal in 1581, subsequently António's forces were utterly defeated at sea by Álvaro de Bazán at the Battle of Ponta Delgada off São Miguel Island in the Azores, on 26 July 1582. António then retreated to Terceira, where he supervised the raising of levies for defense, but in November he left Angra do Heroísmo en route to France to persuade the French to furnish more troops, 800 of which arrived in June 1583. Philip had despatched Santa Cruz with an overwhelming force which left Lisbon on 23 June, and reaching sight of São Miguel some time after 7 July, finally reduced the Azores to subjection.

The Cortes in Tomar acknowledged Philip II of Spain as King Philip I of Portugal on 16 April 1581 after this Spanish military intervention. From 1581, the House of Aviz had ceased to rule any portion of continental Portugal; António, Prior of Crato held out in the Azores into 1582 as António I of Portugal; the last of his allies in the islands finally surrendered in 1583.

The House of Aviz was succeeded in Portugal by Philip's personal union of the Crowns of Portugal and Spain. In Portuguese history this is variously referred to as the Philippine Dynasty, the House of Habsburg, or the House of Austria. Portugal and Spain would share a common monarch until 1640, upon the proclamation of the Duke of Braganza as John IV of Portugal.

== Aviz monarchs ==
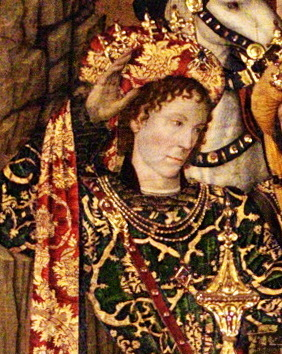
Peter V of Aragon, king in opposition to John II.

Monarchs of Portugal

Name	Reign	Notes
John I of Portugal	1385–1433	Founder of the House of Aviz
Duarte I of Portugal	1433–1438	Oldest member of the Illustrious Generation
Afonso V of Portugal	1438–1481
John II of Portugal	1481–1495
Manuel I of Portugal	1495–1521	Formerly Duke of Beja
John III of Portugal	1521–1557
Sebastian I of Portugal	1557–1578	Death at Battle of Alcácer Quibir triggers Portuguese succession crisis of 1580
Henry I of Portugal	1578–1580	Last Aviz monarch recognized by the Portuguese Cortes
António I of Portugal	1580	Disputed reign in opposition to King Philip I of Portugal in the War of the Portuguese Succession

Monarchs of Aragon

Name	Reign	Notes
Peter V of Aragon	1463–1466	Disputed reign in opposition to King John II of Aragon in the Catalan Civil War

== Symbols ==
=== Cross of Aviz ===
Cross of Aviz.

Following his success in succeeding to the throne following the 1383–1385 Portuguese interregnum, King John I of Portugal took the Cross of the Order of Aviz as his heraldic badge, adding it to the coat of arms of Portugal and the according royal flags. King John I enforced the imagery of his position as Grand-Master of the Order of Aviz, lending its name to his newly founded royal house and its cross as his personal charge on the royal arms. This was effected in various ways: by insertion within the bordure, alternating with the castles; more commonly inserted within the shield, and occasionally shown outside the shield with the latter laying over it. The Cross of Aviz is a cross flory vert (a green cross with a fleur-de-lys at the end of each arm)

=== Armillary sphere ===
Personal standard of King Manuel I.

The armillary sphere has been an important element of Portuguese heraldry since the reign of King Manuel I of Portugal. The armillary sphere became a royal badge for the Portuguese monarchy, apart from being part of the personal standard of King Manuel I. It acts as a supporter to the Coat of arms of Portugal, also present on the current Flag of Portugal.

Owing to the association with King Manuel I and other Aviz monarchs with the Portuguese discoveries, the armillary sphere was commonly used as a symbol representing Portuguese sovereignty across the Portuguese Empire. The symbol was a consistent motif in both Manueline and Neo-Manueline architecture. It also became particularly associated with Colonial Brazil and the subsequent United Kingdom of Portugal, Brazil, and the Algarves.

An important element of Portuguese heraldry since the 15th century, the armillary sphere was many times used in Portuguese naval and colonial flags, mainly in Brazil. It was a navigation instrument used to calculate distances and represents the importance of Portugal during the Age of Discovery, as well as the vastness of its colonial empire when the First Republic was implemented.

=== Coats of arms ===
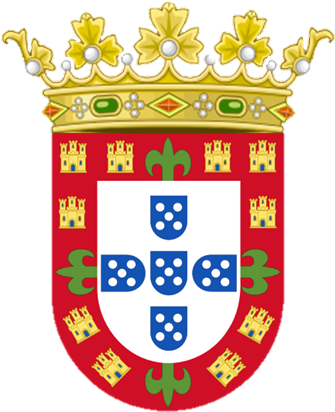
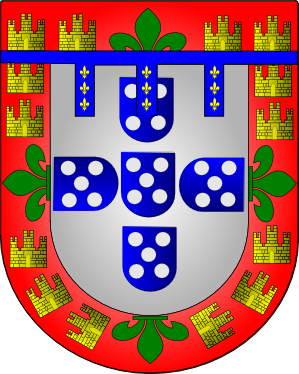
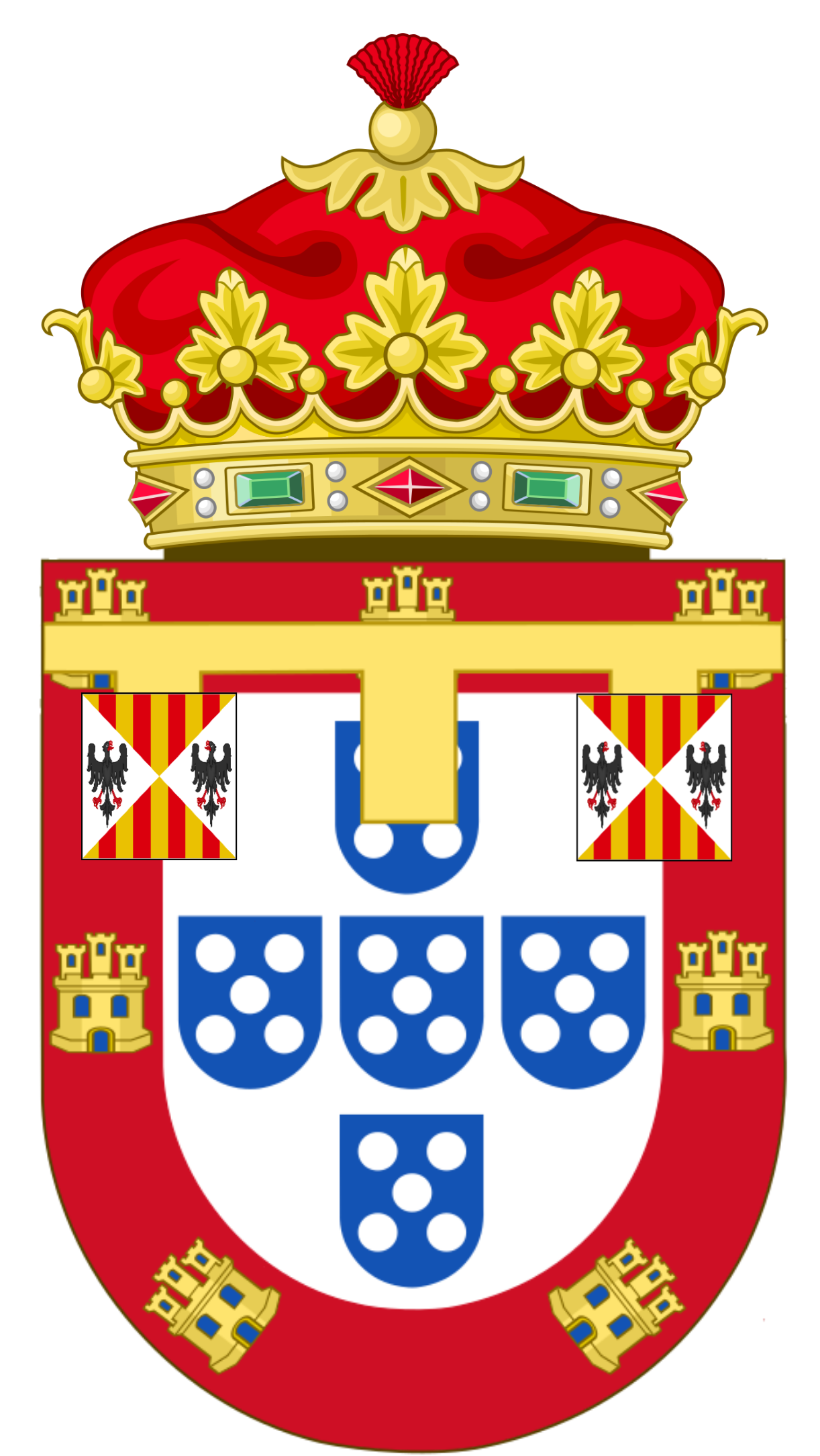
Coat of arms	Title	Tenure	Coat of arms	Title	Tenure	Coat of arms	Title	Tenure
	King of Portugal	1385–1580		King of the Algarves	1385–1580		King of Aragon *in opposition to King John II of Aragon	1463–1466
	Prince of Antioch *jure uxoris through Queen Charlotte of Cyprus	1456-1457		Duke of Viseu	1394-1577		Duke of Beja	1433-1555

== Notable members of the House of Aviz ==
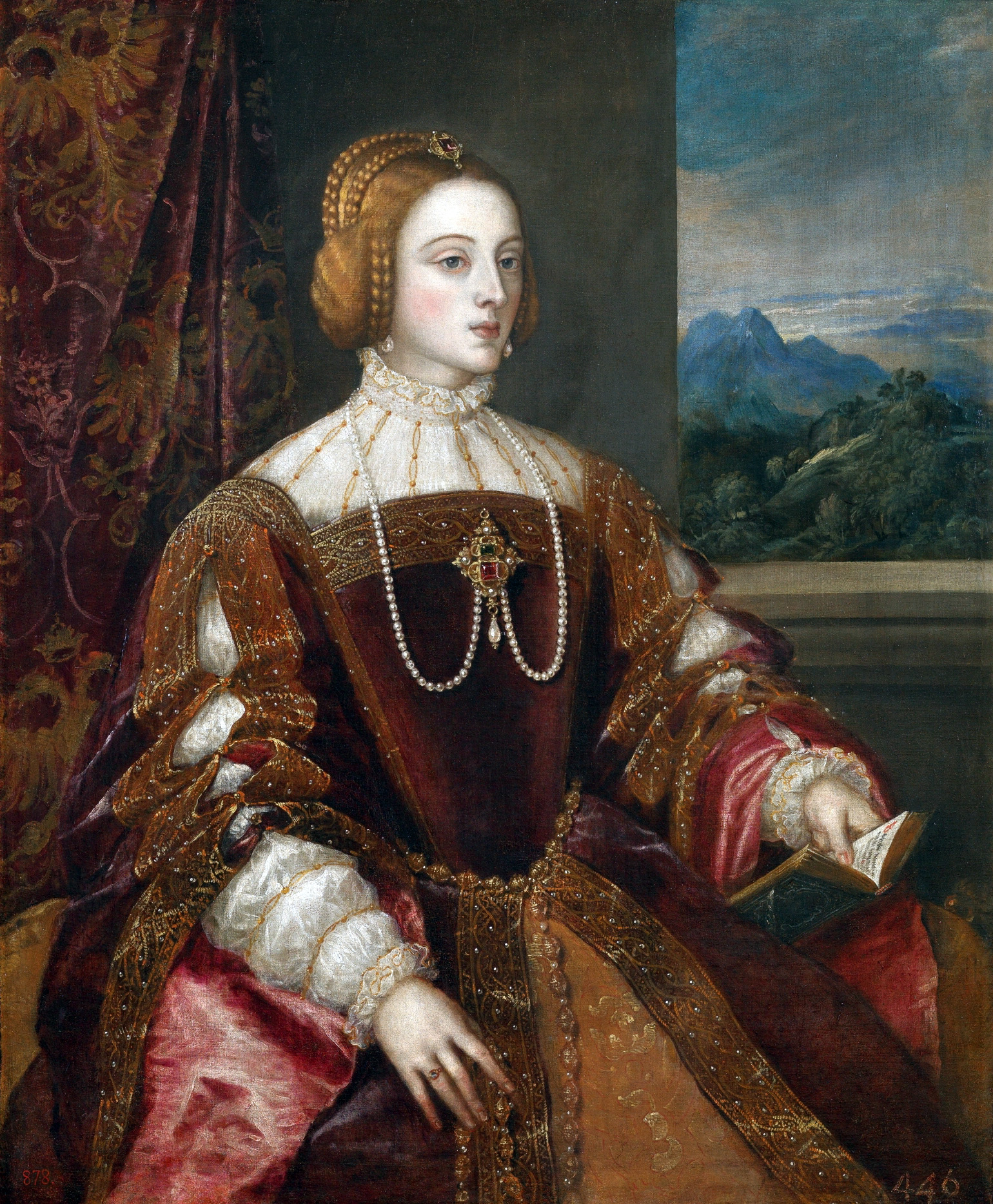
Isabel, Holy Roman Empress and Queen of Spain.

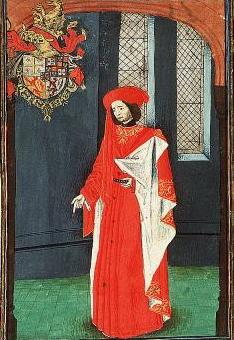
John, Prince of Antioch.

- Peter, Duke of Coimbra, regent of Portugal for nine years.
- Henry the Navigator, Duke of Viseu.
- Isabella, Duchess of Burgundy, twice regent of the Burgundian Low Countries; wife of Philip the Good, Duke of Burgundy, mother of Charles the Bold.
- John, Constable of Portugal.
- Ferdinand the Holy Prince.
- Ferdinand, Duke of Viseu, also first Duke of Beja.
- Eleanor of Portugal, Holy Roman Empress, wife of Frederick III, Holy Roman Emperor, mother of Maximilian I, Holy Roman Emperor.
- Joanna, Princess of Portugal, daughter of Afonso V. Regent of Portugal and Roman Catholic saint.
- Peter, Constable of Portugal, son of Peter, Duke of Coimbra. King of Aragon, count of Barcelona.
- James of Portugal, son of Peter, Duke of Coimbra. Cardinal and Archbishop of Lisbon.
- Beatrice of Coimbra married Adolph of Cleves, Lord of Ravenstein.
- Isabel of Coimbra, daughter of Peter, Duke of Coimbra, first wife of Afonso V, mother of John II.
- Philippa of Coimbra, unmarried, served as a mother to John II after the death of her sister, Isabella of Coimbra. Lived in the monastery of Odivelas.
- John, Prince of Antioch, son of Peter, Duke of Coimbra.
- Eleanor of Viseu, daughter of Ferdinand, Duke of Viseu and wife of John II of Portugal.
- Isabella of Portugal, empress of the Holy Roman Empire, queen of Aragon, Castile, Sicily, and Naples, wife of Charles V, Holy Roman Emperor (Charles I of Spain), mother of Philip II of Spain.
- Beatrice, Duchess of Savoy, daughter of Manuel I, who brought the name "Manuel" (Italian: "Emanuele") into the House of Savoy.
- Louis, Duke of Beja, son of Manuel I, lover and possibly later husband of the wealthy New Christian Violante Gomes; their son António, Prior of Crato was the disputed last Aviz king of Portugal.
- Edward, Duke of Guimarães, constable of the kingdom.
- Maria of Guimarães, daughter of Edward, Duke of Guimarães, wife of Alexander Farnese, Duke of Parma (and hence Duchess of Parma), who brought the previously exotic Portuguese cuisine to the rest of Europe.
- Catherine, Duchess of Braganza, daughter of Edward, Duke of Guimarães, niece of King Henry, grandmother of John IV of Portugal.
- Edward, Duke of Guimarães, son of Edward, Duke of Guimarães, constable of the kingdom.

== Family tree of the House of Aviz ==
Peter I 1320–1367; King of Portugal r. 1357–1367	Teresa Lourenço b. 1330
Ferdinand I 1345–1383; King of Portugal r. 1367–1383	Philippa of Lancaster; 1360–1415	John I 1357–1433; King of Portugal r. 1385–1433	Inês Peres c. 1350 – c. 1400
Ferdinand I 1380–1416; King of Aragon	Beatrice c. 1386–1439; Countess of Arundel	Afonso; 1377–1461; 1st Duke of Braganza
Eleanor of Aragon; 1402–1445	Edward; 1391–1438; King of Portugal r. 1433–1438	Isabella; 1397–1471; Duchess of Burgundy	Henry; 1394–1460; Duke of Viseu	Peter; 1392–1449; Duke of Coimbra	Isabella of Urgell; 1409–1459	Ferdinand; 1402–1443; The Holy Prince	John; 1400–1442; Constable of Portugal	Isabel of Barcelos; 1402–1466	Fernando I 1403–1478; 2nd Duke of Braganza
John II; 1398–1479; King of Aragon	Maria of Aragon; 1396–1445	John II; 1405–1454; King of Castile	Isabella; 1428–1496
Eleanor; 1434–1467	Frederick III; 1415–1493; Holy Roman Emperor	Catherine; 1436–1463	Henry IV; 1425–1474; King of Castile	Joan; 1439–1475	Ferdinand; 1433–1470; Duke of Viseu	Beatrice; 1430–1506
Maximilian I 1459–1519; Holy Roman Emperor	Mary of Burgundy; 1457–1482	Ferdinand II of Aragon; 1452–1516; King of Castile	Isabella I 1451–1504; Queen of Castile	Isabella of Coimbra; 1432–1455	Afonso V 1432–1481; King of Portugal r. 1438–1477, r. 1477–1481	Joanna la Beltraneja; 1462–1530
Joanna; 1452–1490	John II; 1455–1495; King of Portugal r. 1477, r. 1481–1495	Eleanor of Viseu; 1458–1525	Isabella of Viseu; 1459–1521	Fernando II; 1430–1483; 3rd Duke of Braganza
Philip I 1478–1506; King of Castile	Joanna; 1479–1555; Queen of Castile	Catherine of Aragon; 1485–1536	Henry VIII; 1491–1547; King of England	Afonso; 1475–1491; Prince of Portugal	Isabella of Aragon; 1470–1498	Manuel I 1469–1521; King of Portugal r. 1495–1521	Maria of Aragon; 1482–1517	Jaime; 1479–1532; 4th Duke of Braganza
Ferdinand I 1503–1564; Holy Roman Emperor	Catherine; 1507–1578	John III; 1502–1557; King of Portugal r. 1521–1557	Charles V(I); 1500–1558; King of Spain	Isabella; 1503–1539	Beatrice; 1504–1538; Countess of Asti	Charles III; 1486–1553; Duke of Savoy	Henry; 1512–1580; King of Portugal r. 1578–1580	Edward; 1515–1540; Duke of Guimarães	Isabella of Braganza; 1514–1576
Afonso; 1509–1540; Cardinal-Infante	Louis; Duke of Beja; 1506 —1555	Ferdinand; 1507–1534; Duke of Guarda	Guiomar; Coutinho of Marialva d. 1534
Third Dynasty; House of Habsburg
João; Manuel; 1537–1554	Joanna of Austria; 1535–1573	Maria Manuela; 1527–1545	Philip I(II); 1527–1598; King of Portugal r. 1581–1598	Teodósio I 1510–1563; 5th Duke of Braganza
Sebastian; 1554–1578; King of Portugal r. 1557–1578	António; 1531–1595; Prior of Crato; King of Portugal r. 1580–1582	Catarina; 1540–1614	João I 1543–1583; 6th Duke of Braganza
Ana de Velasco y Girón; 1585–1607	Teodósio II; 1568–1630; 7th Duke of Braganza
Fourth Dynasty; House of Braganza
John IV; 1604–1656; King of Portugal r. 1640–1656

== See also ==
- House of Aviz kings of Portugal family tree
- Illustrious Generation
- Portugal in the period of discoveries
- Timeline of Portuguese history
- Descendants of Manuel I of Portugal

*Royal House* House of Aviz Cadet branch of the Portuguese House of Burgundy
Preceded by Portuguese House of Burgundy	Ruling House of the Kingdom of Portugal; 1385–1580	Succeeded by House of Habsburg
Titles in pretence
Preceded by Itself as the reigning house	— TITULAR — Claimant House of the Portuguese monarchy 1580–1638; Reason for succession failure: War of the Portuguese Succession	Claim extinct
