= Eleanor of Viseu =

Queen of Portugal from 1481 to 1495

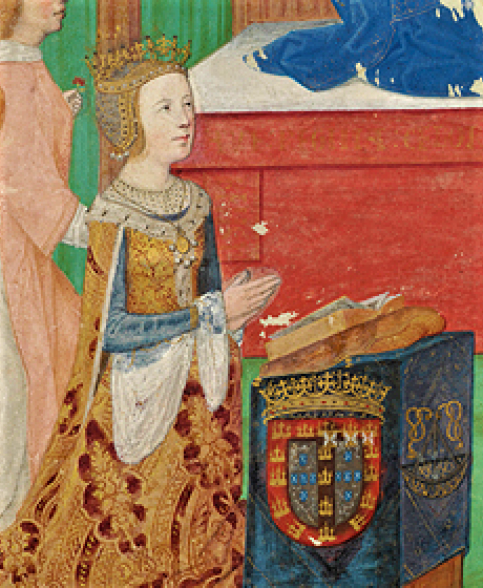
- Portrait miniature, c. 1500 (Morgan Library, MS M.52)

Queen consort of Portugal
- Tenure: 28 August 1481 – 25 October 1495
- Tenure: 11 November 1477 – 15 November 1477
- Born: 2 May 1458; Beja, Portugal
- Died: 17 November 1525 (aged 67); Palace of Xabregas, Lisbon
- Burial: Convent of the Mother of God
- Spouse: John II of Portugal (m. 1470; died 1495)
- Issue Detail: Afonso, Prince of Portugal
- House: Aviz
- Father: Ferdinand, Duke of Viseu
- Mother: Beatrice of Portugal

Dona Eleanor of Avis (Portuguese: Leonor de Avis [li.uˈnoɾ ðɨ viˈzew]; 2 May 1458 – 17 November 1525), also known as Leonor de Lencastre or Eleanor of Viseu (after her father's title, Duke of Viseu), was a Portuguese infanta (princess) and queen consort of Portugal. She was the wife of King John II of Portugal and the sister of King Manuel I of Portugal. Eleanor is one of Portugal's more famous queen consorts and is best known as the founder of the Santa Casa da Misericórdia, a charitable organization operating since 1498.

== Early life and background ==
Eleanor was the eldest daughter of Infante Fernando, Duke of Viseu and his wife Beatrice of Portugal. Both of her parents were grandchildren of John I of Portugal and Philippa of Lancaster.

Little is known about Eleanor's early life. Her education and upbringing were likely guided by the writings of her grandfather Edward I of Portugal.

=== Marriage ===
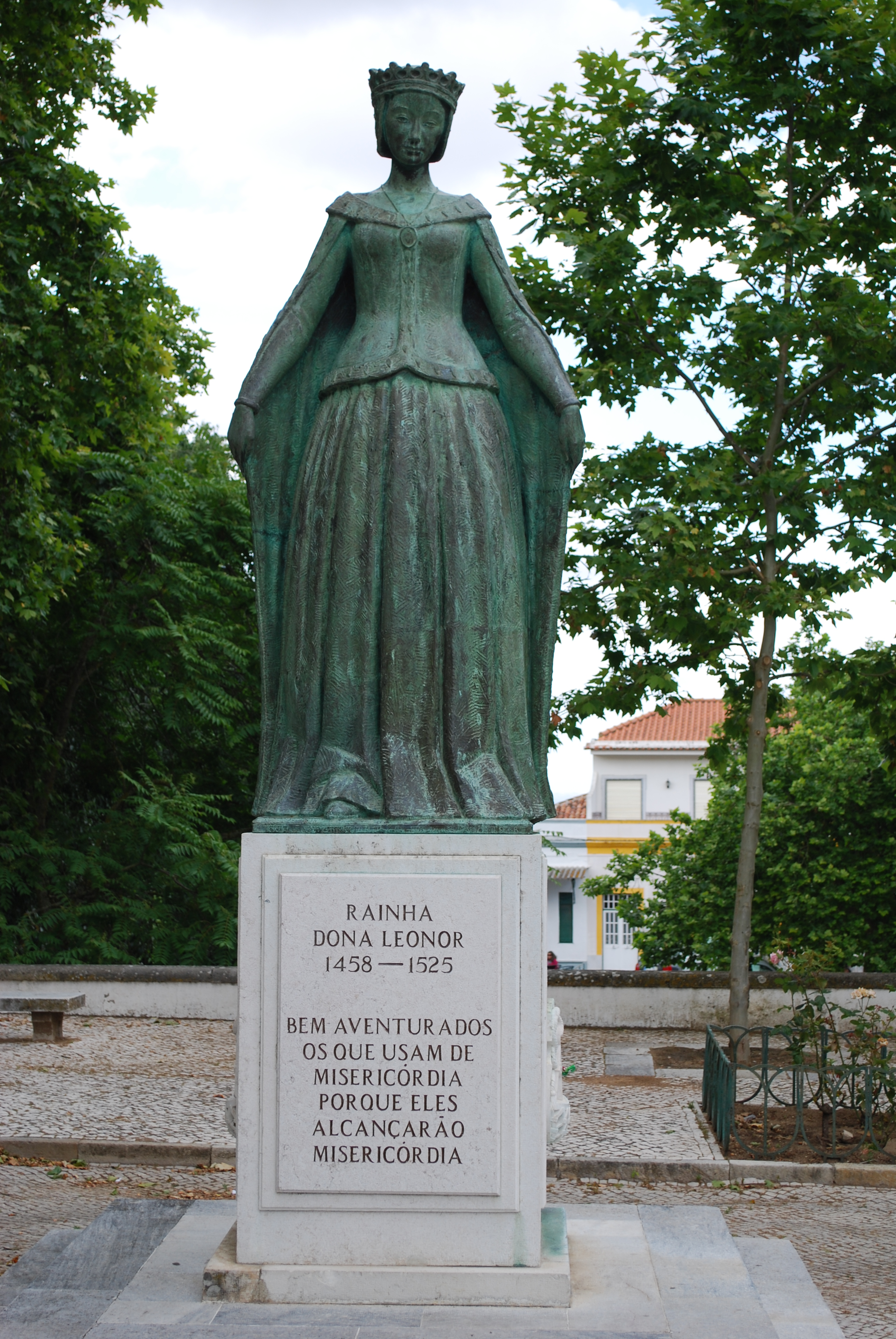
Queen Eleanor of Portugal statue in Beja

On 22 January 1471, twelve year old Eleanor married the fifteen year old John, Prince of Portugal, son of her uncle Afonso V and his wife Isabella of Coimbra and the heir apparent to the throne of Portugal. Around the same time, Eleanor's sister Isabel of Viseu married Fernando II of Braganza, head of the most powerful noble house in Portugal.

In May 1475, while her husband and father-in-law were invading Castile, Eleanor gave birth to her only child to survive infancy, Afonso. John returned home sometime after but left again in January 1476, appointing Eleanor regent of the kingdom.

== Queen consort ==
Upon the death of Afonso V on 28 August 1481 John ascended the throne as King of Portugal with Eleanor as his queen consort. The queens consort of Portugal were awarded fiefs and villages to grant them independent incomes, and Eleanor was granted Silves e Faro and Terras de Aldeia Galega e Aldeia Gavinha for this purpose.

From the onset of his reign, John II focused heavily on diminishing the powers of the most powerful noble houses in the kingdom, namely the House of Beja and Viseu and the House of Braganza. His aggressive centralization policies impacted some of Eleanor's closest relatives. In 1483, John accused the Queen's brother-in-law, Fernando II of Braganza, of treason and had him executed. Later, in 1484, the Queen's brother Diogo, Duke of Viseu was accused of leading a conspiracy against the crown and was stabbed to death in 1484 by the king himself.

Eleanor is credited as the founder of Caldas da Rainha. In 1484, at the site of water that healed of her of an unknown affliction while traveling from Óbidos to Batalha, the queen ordered a hospital built so that others could enjoy the same relief. Construction began the following year, and although the first patients were admitted in 1488, the works were not completed until about 1496 or 1497. To finance the hospital and its adjoining church, the queen sold her jewels and used income from her landholdings. The name of the settlement that grew around the site and became Caldas da Rainha refers to both its founder and the reason for its existence. The city's name can be translated as "Queen's Hot Springs", "Queen's Spa", or "Queen's Baths".

Eleanor and John II's only child, Afonso, died in a horse accident in 1491, leaving the succession uncertain. John wanted his illegitimate son Jorge to succeed him but Eleanor was intent on securing succession for her younger brother Manuel. Following bitter disputes with Eleanor and a failed petition to Rome to have Jorge legitimized, John finally recognized Manuel as his heir in his will a few weeks before his death.

== Queen dowager ==
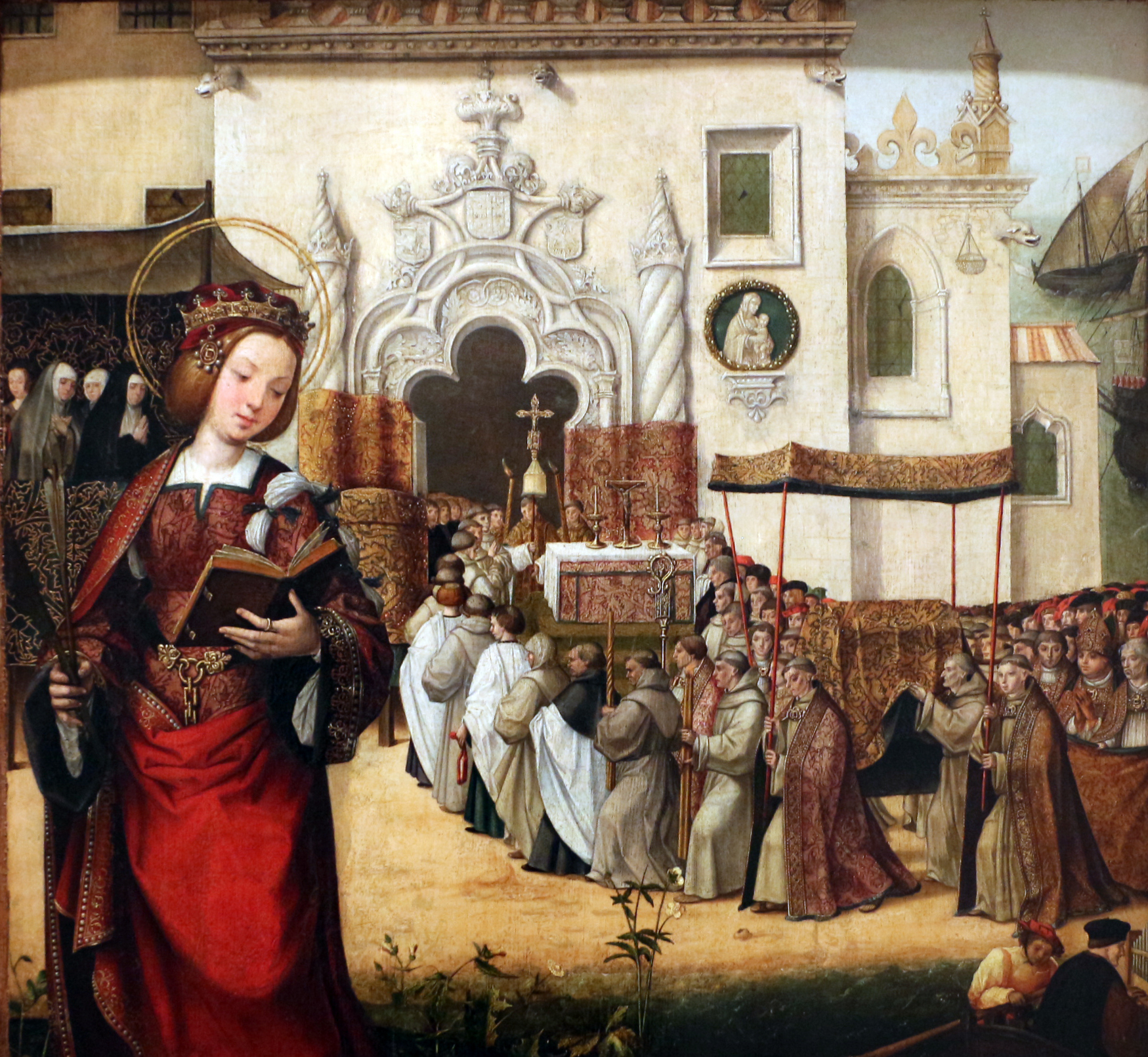
The Arrival of D. Leonor with the Relics of Santa Auta at Madre de Deus by Cristóvão de Figueiredo.

After her brother Manuel I succeeded to the throne in 1495, Eleanor moved to the palace of Xabregas, where she hosted the royal court and continued to be socially active. For a short period between 1500 and 1502, Eleanor's brother Manuel found himself childless, and Eleanor herself became the heir to the throne. As she had no children, she declined to make the oath as an heir in favour of her sister Isabel.

Eleanor was extremely wealthy and used much of her money for charity. In 1498, she spearheaded the creation of the Santa Casa da Misericórdia as confraternities with humanitarian purposes, especially the care of the poor and the sick. The original foundations survive today, and more have since been founded in other towns and cities of Portugal and in the Portuguese colonies.

Eleanor is also credited with having introduced the printing press to Portugal, when she commissioned a translation of Vita Christi into Portuguese. When the first of its four volumes were published in 1502, it became the first book to be printed in Alcalá de Henares.

Eleanor supported the foundation of the Hospital Real de Todos-os-Santos (All Saints' Royal Hospital) in Lisbon, considered the best in contemporary Europe. She also founded the convent Madre de Deus (1509), considered a great architectural work, where she spent many of her later years, dressed almost as a nun.

== Issue ==
Name	Birth	Death	Notes
Prince Afonso	18 May 1475	13 July 1491	Crown Prince of Portugal. Died in a horse riding accident, leading to the accession of his uncle Manuel I.
Stillborn son	1483	1483	

== Ancestry ==
Ancestors of Eleanor of Viseu

8. John I of Portugal (= 12)
4. Edward I of Portugal
9. Philippa of Lancaster (= 13)
2. Ferdinand, Duke of Viseu
10. Ferdinand I of Aragon
5. Eleanor of Aragon
11. Eleanor of Alburquerque
1. Eleanor of Viseu
12. John I of Portugal (= 8)
6. John, Constable of Portugal
13. Philippa of Lancaster (= 9)
3. Beatriz of Portugal
14. Afonso I, Duke of Braganza
7. Isabel of Barcelos
15. Beatriz Pereira de Alvim

Eleanor of Viseu House of Aviz Cadet branch of the House of Burgundy Born: 2 May 1458 Died: 17 November 1525
Portuguese royalty
Preceded by Joanna la Beltraneja	Queen consort of Portugal; 1477 – 1477	Succeeded by Joanna la Beltraneja
Preceded by Joanna la Beltraneja	Queen consort of Portugal; 1481 – 1495	Succeeded by Isabella of Aragon
