= Duke of Guarda =

The coat of arms of Infante Ferdinand, Duke of Guarda

The title of Duke of Guarda (in Portuguese, Duque da Guarda) was granted by a royal decree dated from October 5, 1530, by King John III to his younger brother, Infante Ferdinand.

Some authors say the Infante was also made Duke of Trancoso (in Portuguese, Duque de Trancoso) at the same date (according to Arquivo do Conselho Nobiliárquico de Portugal, Vol I, 78).

However, the majority of historians maintain that the Dukedom of Trancoso did not exist, and that the confusion comes from the fact that Infante Ferdinand (Fernando, in Portuguese) was also Lord of Trancoso.

Finally, others say he was Duke of Guarda and Trancoso (a joint dukedom).

Whatever the truth of this, it is certain that Infante Ferdinand was the sole bearer of the title of Duke of Guarda.

According to the will of his father, King Manuel I, Infante Ferdinand was intended to marry the rich and prestigious heiress Dona Guiomar Coutinho, 5th Countess of Marialva and 3rd Countess of Loulé.

But when the Infante's marriage was announced, the Marquis of Torres Novas (who later became the 1st Duke of Aveiro) declared that he had already secretly married the rich heiress. The scandal in the Court ended when King John III ordered the imprisonment of the marquis for several years, allowing the celebration of the Infante Ferdinand's marriage.

The marriage was short but apparently happy: the couple had two children (a boy and a girl), who died at a very young age, before their parents.

== List of dukes of Guarda ==
1. Infante Fernando, Duke of Guarda (1507–1534), King Manuel I's third son from his second marriage.

== See also ==
- Count of Marialva
- Count of Loulé
- Dukedoms in Portugal

== Bibliography ==
”Nobreza de Portugal e do Brasil” – Vol. I, page 385. Published by Zairol Lda., Lisbon 1989.
