= Diogo, Duke of Viseu =

Son of Duke of Viseu, Portugal (1450–1484)

Diogo
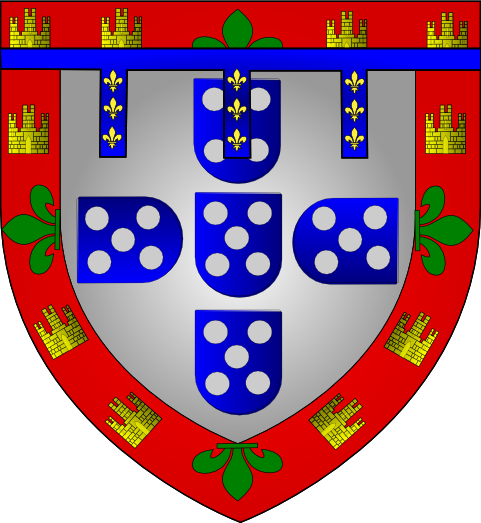
- Duke of Viseu

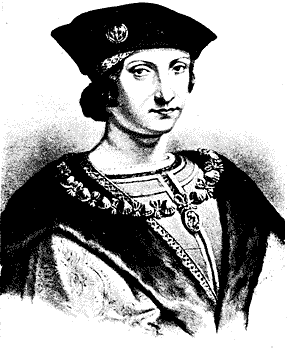
- Diogo, Duke of Viseu

Duke of Viseu and Beja
- Reign: 1472 - 1484
- Predecessor: João, Duke of Viseu
- Successor: Manuel I of Portugal
- Born: 1450
- Died: 1484 (aged 33–34)
- House: Aviz
- Father: Ferdinand, Duke of Viseu
- Mother: Beatriz of Portugal

Infante Diogo of Viseu (1450–1484) was the second son of Ferdinand, Duke of Viseu, and his wife Beatriz, Duchess of Viseu.

== History ==
Diogo's father, uncle of King John II, was believed to be the richest man in Portugal, having accumulated two duchies and numerous lordships. In 1472, when his older brother John, Duke of Viseu, died without issue, Diogo inherited his titles and estates as Duke of Viseu and Duke of Beja.

Diogo was a popular personality at the court of his cousin King John II, and together with Duke Fernando II of Braganza, he was the main target of King John's centralization policies. John II sought to limit the power of the upper nobility, which had increased greatly during the reign of John's father Afonso V of Portugal.

Duke Fernando II of Braganza, husband of Isabella of Viseu, the sister-in-law of King John II of Portugal and Diogo's sister, was the first victim of John's efforts against the Portuguese nobility. In 1483, he was imprisoned, tried and executed in Évora.

In 1484, Diogo was accused of being the center of a conspiracy against the crown and was stabbed to death by the king himself.

After the execution, King John II called the duke's younger brother, Infante Manuel of Viseu, and showed him his brother's body. He promised Manuel that he would consider him his own son. At that moment, Manuel inherited his brother Diogo's titles and estates.

Duke Diogo never married, but when he was quite young he visited the Crown of Castile, where he had a love affair with Doña Leonor de Sotomaior y Portugal (great-granddaughter of King Pedro I of Portugal). With her he had a natural son, Afonso de Portugal. King Manuel I of Portugal granted this nephew, Afonso de Portugal, the position of 8th Constable of Portugal. Afonso's daughter and heir, Beatrice of Lara, married the 3rd Marquis of Vila Real.

== See also ==
- Duke of Beja
- Duke of Viseu
- Dukedoms in Portugal

== Bibliography ==
- Marques, Antonio Henrique R. de Oliveira (1976). History of Portugal. New York: Columbia University Press. ISBN 0-231-08353-X.
- McMurdo, Edward (1889). The history of Portugal, from the Commencement of the Monarchy to the Reign of Alfonso III. London: Sampson Low, Marston, Searle, & Rivington.
- Sanceau, Elaine (1970). Reign of the Fortunate King, 1495–1521: Manuel I of Portugal. Hamden, Conn.: Archon Books. ISBN 0-2080096-8-X.
- Stephens, H. Morse (1891). The Story of Portugal. New York: G. P. Putnam's Sons.
- Nobreza de Portugal e do Brasil (in Portuguese). Vol. III. Lisbon: Zairol Lda. 1989. pp. 544–545.

Diogo, Duke of Viseu House of Aviz Cadet branch of the House of Burgundy Born: ? 1450 Died: ? 1484
Portuguese nobility
Preceded by Infante John	Duke of Beja; 1472–1484	Succeeded by Infante Manuel
Preceded by Infante John	Duke of Viseu; 1472–1484	Succeeded by Infante Manuel
