= Duke of Viseu =

Portuguese nobility title

Coat of Arms of Prince Henry the Navigator, first Duke of Viseu.

Coat of Arms of Infante Ferdinand, 1st Duke of Beja and 2nd Duke of Viseu.

Duke of Viseu (in Portuguese Duque de Viseu) was a Portuguese Royal Dukedom created in 1415 by King John I of Portugal for his third male child, Henry the Navigator, following the conquest of Ceuta.

When Henry the Navigator died without issue, his nephew, Infante Ferdinand of Portugal (King Edward, King of Portugal's younger son), who was already Duke of Beja, inherited the Dukedom of Viseu and, when his younger son became King of Portugal as Manuel I, this became a royal Dukedom.

Between 1460 (Henry's death) and 1495 (Manuel's ascension to the throne), the Viseu-Beja house was the most powerful family in the kingdom, encompassing vast territories in the mainland, the archipelagos of Madeira, Açores and Cape Verde and taxes on the commerce with the African coast. This huge estate was governed by Infanta Beatrice (wife of duke Ferdinand) after she became a widow until her son, Diogo, reached adulthood. During her rule on behalf of her sons, first John and, after John's death, Diogo, she carried out a series of reforms in the island territories and produced a large amount of documentation.

== List of dukes of Viseu ==
1. Infante Henrique, Duke of Viseu (1394–1460), King João I's fourth son (third surviving);
2. Infante Fernando, Duke of Viseu (1433–1470), also 1st Duke of Beja, King Duarte I's third son (second surviving);
3. Infante João, Duke of Viseu (1448–1472), also 2nd Duke of Beja, Infante Fernando's eldest son;
4. Infante Diogo, Duke of Viseu (1450–1484), also 3rd Duke de Beja, Infante Fernando's second son;
5. King Manuel I (1469–1521), Infante Fernando's seventh son (third surviving);
6. Infanta Maria, Duchess of Viseu (1521–1577), King Manuel I's daughter from his third marriage;

=== Claimants ===
Following the establishment of the Portuguese Republic, the following individuals have claimed to be the Dukes of Viseu:

1. Prince Miguel, Duke of Viseu (1878–1923), Prince Miguel, Duke of Braganza's elder son from his first marriage;
2. Infante Miguel, Duke of Viseu (born 1946), Prince Duarte Nuno, Duke of Braganza's second son.

== See also ==
- Dukedoms in Portugal
