= Manuel I of Portugal =

King of Portugal from 1495 to 1521

Manuel I
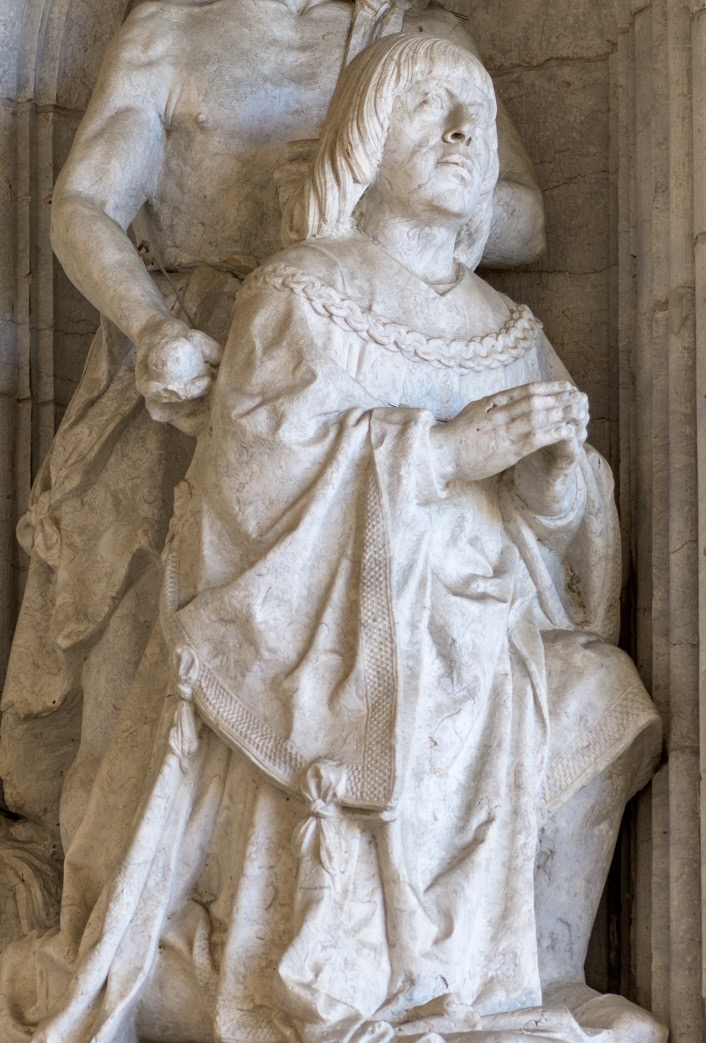
- Statue of King Manuel I by Nicolas Chantereine (c. 1517), Jerónimos Monastery, Lisbon

King of Portugal
- Reign: 25 October 1495 – 13 December 1521
- Enthronement: 27 October 1495
- Predecessor: John II
- Successor: John III
- Born: 31 May 1469; Alcochete, Portugal
- Died: 13 December 1521 (aged 52); Lisbon, Portugal
- Burial: Jerónimos Monastery
- Spouses: Isabella, Princess of Asturias (m. 1497; died 1498) Maria of Aragon (m. 1500; died 1517) Eleanor of Austria (m. 1518)
- Issue Detail: Miguel da Paz, Hereditary Prince of Portugal; John III, King of Portugal; Isabella, Holy Roman Empress; Beatrice, Duchess of Savoy; Louis, Duke of Beja; Ferdinand, Duke of Guarda; Cardinal-Infante Afonso; Henry, King of Portugal; Duarte, Duke of Guimarães; Maria, Duchess of Viseu
- House: Aviz
- Father: Ferdinand, Duke of Viseu
- Mother: Beatrice of Portugal
- Religion: Roman Catholicism

Manuel I (Note: In archaic Portuguese, Manoel.) (European Portuguese: [mɐnuˈɛl]; 31 May 1469 – 13 December 1521), known as the Fortunate (Portuguese: O Venturoso), was King of Portugal from 1495 to 1521. A member of the House of Aviz, Manuel was Duke of Beja and Viseu prior to succeeding his cousin, John II of Portugal, as monarch. Manuel ruled over a period of intensive expansion of the Portuguese Empire owing to the numerous Portuguese discoveries made during his reign. His sponsorship of Vasco da Gama led to the Portuguese discovery of the sea route to India in 1498, resulting in the creation of the Portuguese India Armadas, which guaranteed Portugal's monopoly on the spice trade. Manuel began the Portuguese colonization of the Americas and Portuguese India, and oversaw the establishment of a vast trade empire across Africa and Asia.

Manuel established the Casa da Índia, a royal institution that managed Portugal's monopolies and its imperial expansion. He financed numerous famed Portuguese navigators, including Pedro Álvares Cabral (who discovered Brazil), Afonso de Albuquerque (who established Portuguese hegemony in the Indian Ocean), among numerous others. The income from Portuguese trade monopolies and colonized lands made Manuel the wealthiest monarch in Europe, allowing him to be one of the great patrons of the Portuguese Renaissance, which produced many significant artistic and literary achievements. Manuel patronized numerous Portuguese intellectuals, including playwright Gil Vicente (called the father of Portuguese and Spanish theatre). The Manueline style, considered Portugal's national architecture, is named for the king.

== Early life ==
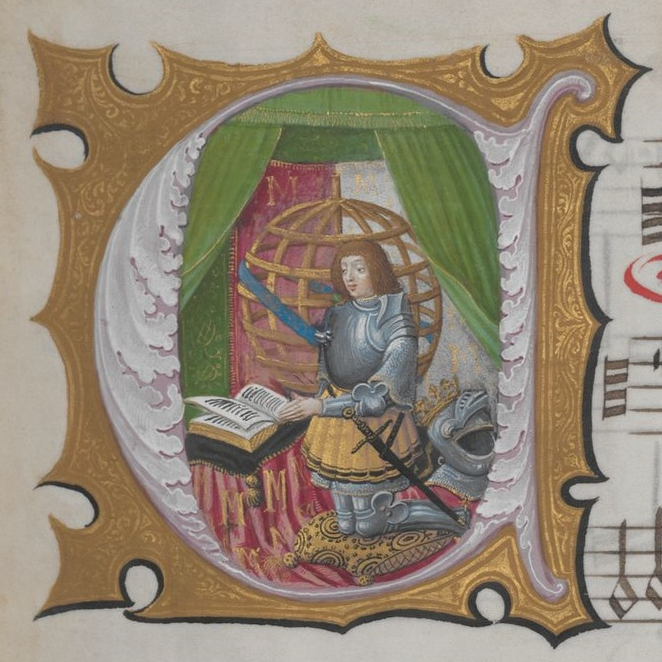
Depiction of Manuel in prayer in his illuminated Gradual, c. 1500 (Austrian National Library).

Manuel was born in Alcochete on 31 May 1469, the ninth child of Ferdinand, Duke of Viseu and Beatriz of Portugal. His father, Ferdinand, was the son of Edward, King of Portugal and the brother of Afonso V of Portugal, while his mother, Beatriz, was granddaughter of King John I of Portugal. In addition, his sister Eleanor of Viseu was the wife of King John II of Portugal.

Manuel grew up amidst strife between the Portuguese noble families and King John II. In 1483, Fernando II, Duke of Braganza, leader of Portugal's most powerful feudal house, was executed for treason. Later, Manuel's older brother, Diogo, Duke of Viseu, was accused of leading a conspiracy against the crown and was stabbed to death in 1484 by the king himself.

After the death of his son Prince Afonso and failed attempts to legitimise his illegitimate son, Jorge de Lencastre, Duke of Coimbra, John II named Manuel heir to the throne. Manuel succeeded John as king of Portugal in 1495.

== Reign ==
=== Imperial expansion ===
King Manuel's royal standard, depicting an armillary sphere, became a symbol of the Portuguese Empire's global expanse and eventually Portugal itself. It can still be seen in Portugal's coat of arms and its flag.

Manuel would prove a worthy successor to his cousin John II for his support of Portuguese exploration of the Atlantic Ocean and development of Portuguese commerce. During his reign, the following achievements were realised:

1498 – The discovery of a maritime route to India by Vasco da Gama.
1500 – The voyage to Brazil by Pedro Álvares Cabral.
1501 – The voyage to Labrador by Gaspar and Miguel Corte-Real.
1503 – The construction of the first feitoria in Brazil by Fernão de Loronha and of a fort in the allied Kingdom of Cochin in India by Afonso de Albuquerque.
1505 – The construction of forts at Kilwa, Sofala, Angediva, and Cannanore by Francisco de Almeida as the first viceroy of India.
1506 – The capture of Essaouira in Morocco by Diogo de Azambuja.
1507 – The capture of Socotra by Tristão da Cunha and Oman by Afonso de Albuquerque.
1508 – The capture of Safi in Morocco by Diogo de Azambuja.
1510 – The capture of Goa in India by Afonso de Albuquerque.
1511 – The capture of Malacca in Malaysia by Afonso de Albuquerque.
1513 – The capture of Azamor in Morocco by Dom Jaime Duke of Braganza.
1515 – The capture of Ormus in the Persian Gulf by Afonso de Albuquerque.

The capture of Malacca in modern-day Malaysia in 1511 was the result of a plan by Manuel I to thwart the Muslim trade in the Indian Ocean by capturing Aden, blocking trade through Alexandria, capturing Ormuz to block trade through the Persian Gulf and Beirut, and capturing Malacca to control trade with China.

All these events made Portugal wealthy from foreign trade as it formally established a vast overseas empire. Manuel used the wealth to build a number of royal buildings (in the "Manueline" style) and to attract artists to his court.

Commercial treaties and diplomatic alliances were forged with the Ming dynasty of China and the Persian Safavid dynasty. Pope Leo X received a monumental embassy from Portugal during his reign designed to draw attention to Portugal's newly acquired riches to all of Europe.

Like Afonso V, Manuel extended his official title to reflect Portugal's expansion. He styled himself King of Portugal and the Algarves, on this side and beyond the Sea in Africa, Lord of Guinea and the Lord of Conquest, Navigation and Commerce in Ethiopia, Arabia, Persia and India.

=== Judicial reform ===
In Manuel's reign, royal absolutism was the method of government. The Portuguese Cortes (the assembly of the kingdom) met only four times during his reign, always in Lisbon, the king's seat.

He reformed the courts of justice and the municipal charters with the crown, modernizing taxes and the concepts of tributes and rights. During his reign, the laws in force in the kingdom were recodified with the publication of the Manueline Ordinances.

=== Religious policy ===
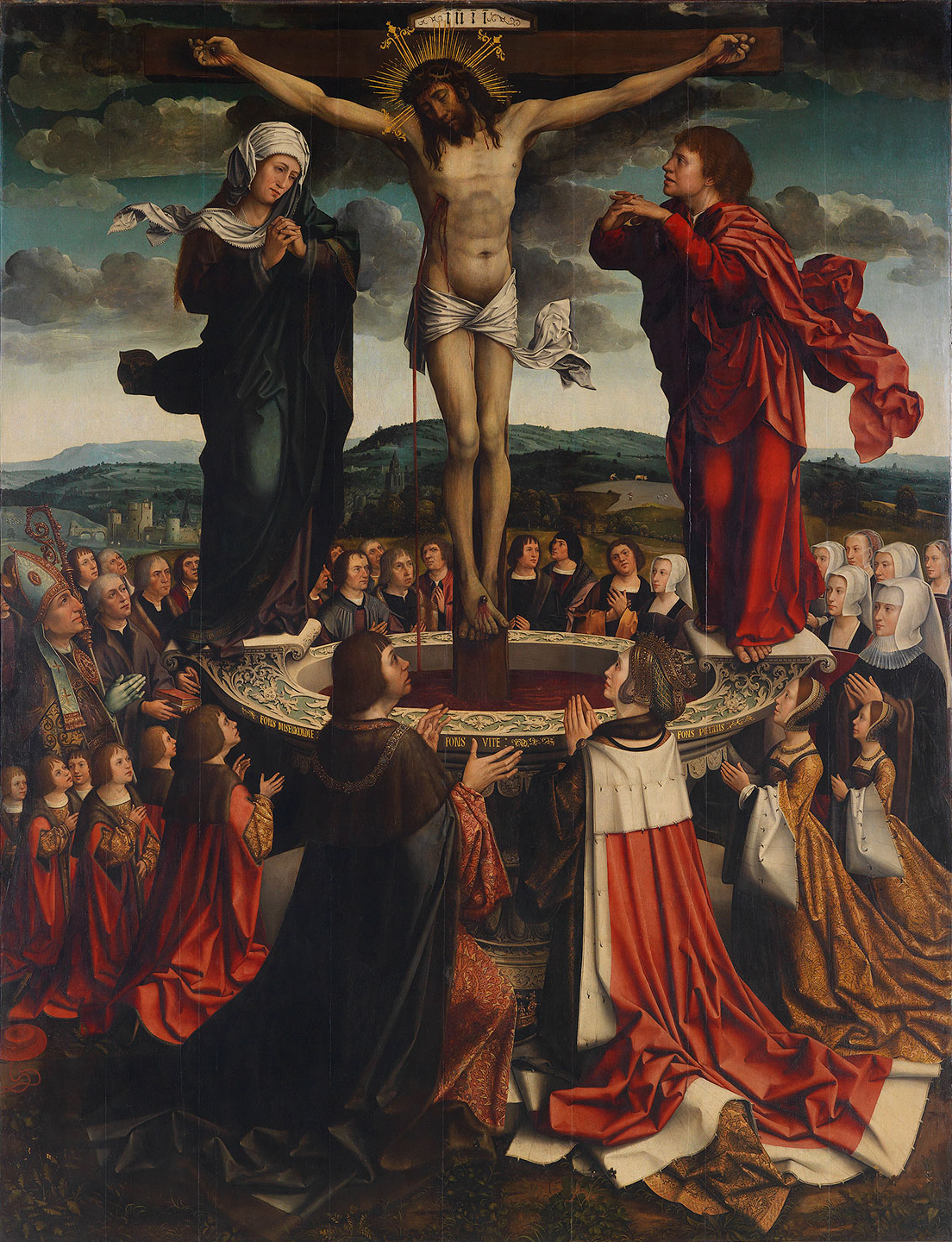
Manuel with his second wife Maria of Aragon and their eight children; by Colijn de Coter, c. 1515–17.

Manuel was a very religious man and invested a large amount of Portuguese income to send missionaries to the new colonies, among them Francisco Álvares, and sponsor the construction of religious buildings, such as the Monastery of Jerónimos. Manuel also endeavoured to promote another crusade against the Turks.

At the outset of his reign, Manuel relaxed conditions that had kept Jews in virtual slavery under John II. However, in 1496, while seeking to marry Infanta Isabella of Aragon, he relented to pressure from her parents, Ferdinand and Isabella, and decreed that Jews who refused baptism must leave the country. Then, before the deadline for their expulsion he converted all Jews to Christianity by royal decree.

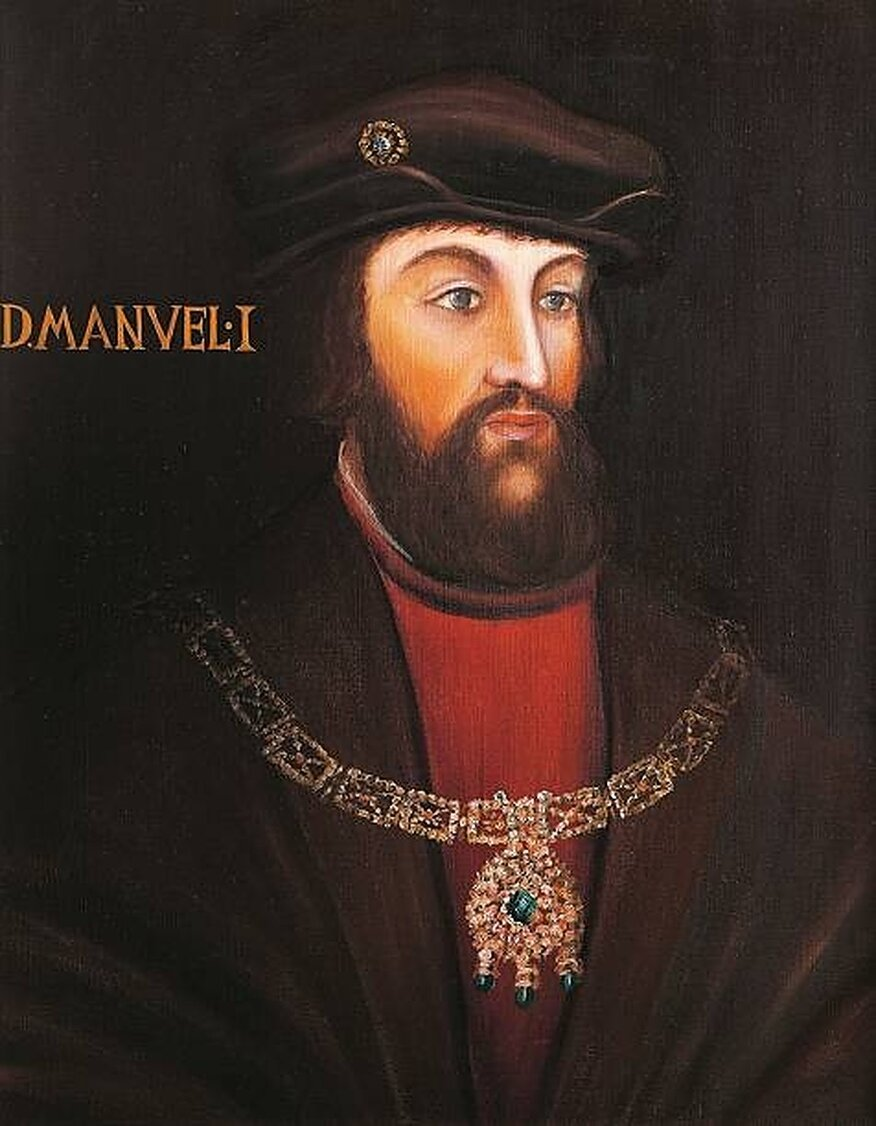
Panel portrait of Manuel I

That period of time technically ended the presence of Jews in Portugal. Afterwards, all converted Jews and their descendants would be referred to as "New Christians" and were given a grace period of thirty years in which no inquiries into their faith would be allowed, which was later extended to end in 1534.

During the Lisbon massacre of 1506, people murdered thousands of accused Jews. The leaders of the riot were executed by Manuel.

In addition, Manuel also ordered the expulsion of Muslims from Portugal, and he is known to have pressured Ferdinand and Isabella of Spain to end the toleration of Islam in their own kingdom.

== Family ==
Isabella died in childbirth, thus putting a damper on Portuguese ambitions to rule in Spain, which various rulers had harbored since the reign of King Ferdinand I (1367–1383). Manuel and Isabella's young son, Miguel da Paz, was named Prince of Asturias, Prince of Portugal, and Prince of Girona, making him heir apparent of Castile, Portugal, and Aragon until his death in 1500, at the age of two years, ended the ambitions of the Catholic Monarchs and Manuel.

Manuel's next wife, Maria of Aragon, was his first wife's younger sister. Two of their sons later became kings of Portugal. Maria died in 1517 but the two sisters were survived by two other sisters, Joanna of Castile, who was born in 1479 and had married Archduke Philip (Maximilian I's son) and had a son, Charles V who would eventually inherit Spain and the Habsburg possessions, and Catherine of Aragon, first wife of Henry VIII. After Maria's death, Manuel married her niece, Eleanor of Austria.

== Honours ==
Manuel I was awarded the Golden Rose by Pope Julius II in 1506 and by Pope Leo X in 1514. Manuel I became the first individual to receive more than one Golden Rose after Emperor Sigismund von Luxembourg.

== Death ==
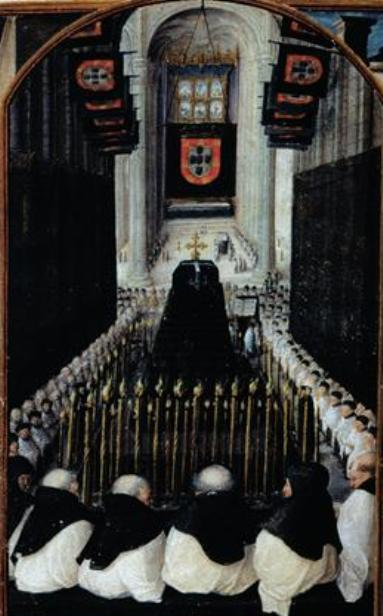
Manuel's funeral in 1521.

In December 1521, while Lisbon was dealing with an outbreak of the Black Plague, Manuel and his court remained at Ribeira Palace. On 4 December, Manuel began displaying symptoms of an intense fever which incapacitated him by the 11th. He died on 13 December 1521, at the age of 52, and was succeeded by his son, John III of Portugal.

The next day, his body was transported to the Belém district of Lisbon, in a black velvet-draped coffin, followed by masses of mourners. He was provisionally buried at Restelo Church, while the royal pantheon of the House of Aviz was furnished inside Jerónimos Monastery. His coffin was buried by four of the most prominent nobles of the kingdom, the Duke of Braganza, the Duke of Coimbra, and the Marquis of Vila Real, in a private ceremony attended only by the royal family and the Portuguese nobility. His remains were transferred to Jerónimos Monastery in 1551, along with his second wife Maria of Aragon.

== Genealogy ==
=== Ancestry ===
Ancestors of Manuel I of Portugal

8. John I of Portugal (= 12)
4. Edward I of Portugal
9. Philippa of Lancaster (= 13)
2. Ferdinand, Duke of Viseu
10. Ferdinand I of Aragon
5. Eleanor of Aragon
11. Eleanor of Alburquerque
1. Manuel I of Portugal
12. John I of Portugal (= 8)
6. John, Constable of Portugal
13. Philippa of Lancaster (= 9)
3. Beatrice of Portugal
14. Afonso I, Duke of Braganza
7. Isabel of Barcelos
15. Beatriz Pereira de Alvim

=== Marriages and Issue ===
Manuel was married three times, to two daughters and one granddaughter of Ferdinand and Isabella of Spain:

- Isabella, married from 30 September 1497 – 23 August 1498, died in childbirth
- Maria, married from 30 October 1500 – 7 March 1517, died from complications of pregnancy
- Eleanor, married from 16 July 1518 – 13 December 1521, outlived Manuel, later Queen Consort of France.

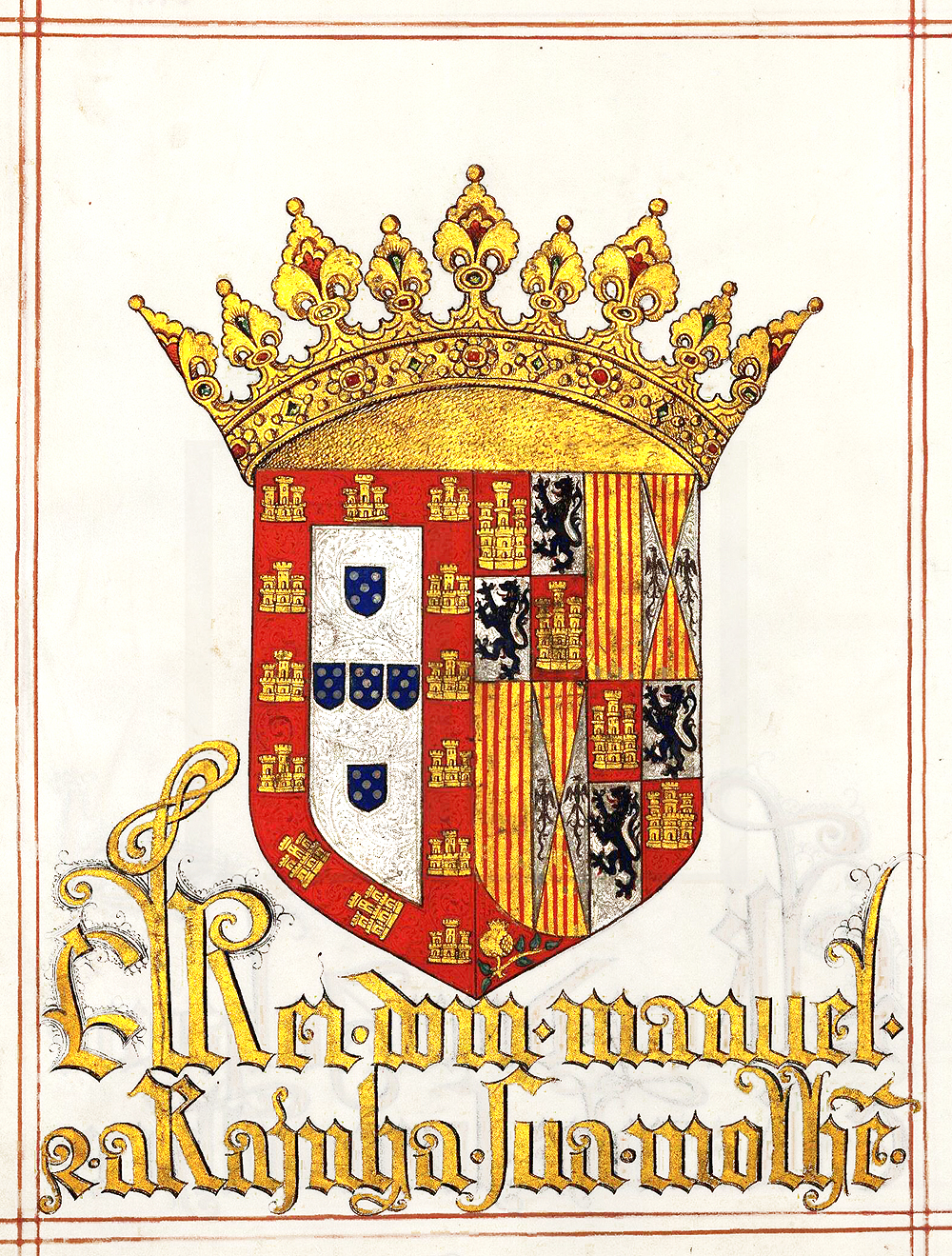
Coat of Arms of King Manuel and Queen Maria of Aragon.

Name	Portrait	Lifespan	Notes
By Isabel of Aragon (2 October 1470 – 23 August 1498; married 30 September 1497)
Miguel, Prince of Asturias & Portugal		23 August 1498 – 19 July 1500	Heir to all of the Iberian kingdoms of Portugal, Castile, and Aragon as Prince of Asturias, Prince of Portugal, and Prince of Girona, until his premature death.
By Maria of Aragon (29 June 1482 – 7 March 1517; married 30 October 1500)
John III of Portugal		7 June 1502 – 11 June 1557	King of Portugal from 1521 until 1557. He was married to Catherine of Austria, daughter of King Philip I of Castile and Queen Joana I of Castile. He had nine children from this marriage.
Isabel, Holy Roman Empress		24 October 1503 – 1 May 1539	Married Charles V, Holy Roman Emperor. She had five children from this marriage, including Philip II of Spain.
Beatriz, Duchess of Savoy		31 December 1504 – 8 January 1538	Married Charles III, Duke of Savoy. She had seven children from this marriage.
Luís, Duke of Beja		3 March 1506 – 27 November 1555	Never married but had an illegitimate son, António, Prior of Crato, who tried to claim the throne of Portugal during the 1580 dynastic crisis.
Fernando, Duke of Guarda		5 June 1507 – 7 November 1534	Married Guiomar Coutinho, Countess of Marialva and Loulé. He had two children from this marriage.
Afonso, Cardinal-Archbishop of Lisbon		23 April 1509 – 21 April 1540	He was a Cardinal-Infante, Prince of the Church, Archbishop of Lisbon, and Bishop of Évora.
Infanta Maria		1511 – 1513	She died at the age of 2.
Henry I of Portugal		31 January 1512 – 31 January 1580	King of Portugal from 1578 until 1580. He was a Cardinal-Infante, Prince of the Church, Archbishop of Lisbon, and the only cardinal in history to reign as king.
Duarte, Duke of Guimarães		7 October 1515 – 20 September 1540	Married Isabel of Braganza. He had three children from this marriage. He was the great-grandfather of John IV.
Infante António		8 September 1516 – 1 November 1516	He died less than two months later.
By Eleanor of Austria (15 November 1498 – 25 February 1558; married 16 July 1518)
Infante Carlos		18 February 1520 – 14 April 1521	He died at the age of 1 of a fever.
Maria, Duchess of Viseu		18 June 1521 – 10 October 1577	Never married. She was the richest woman in Europe of her time.

== See also ==
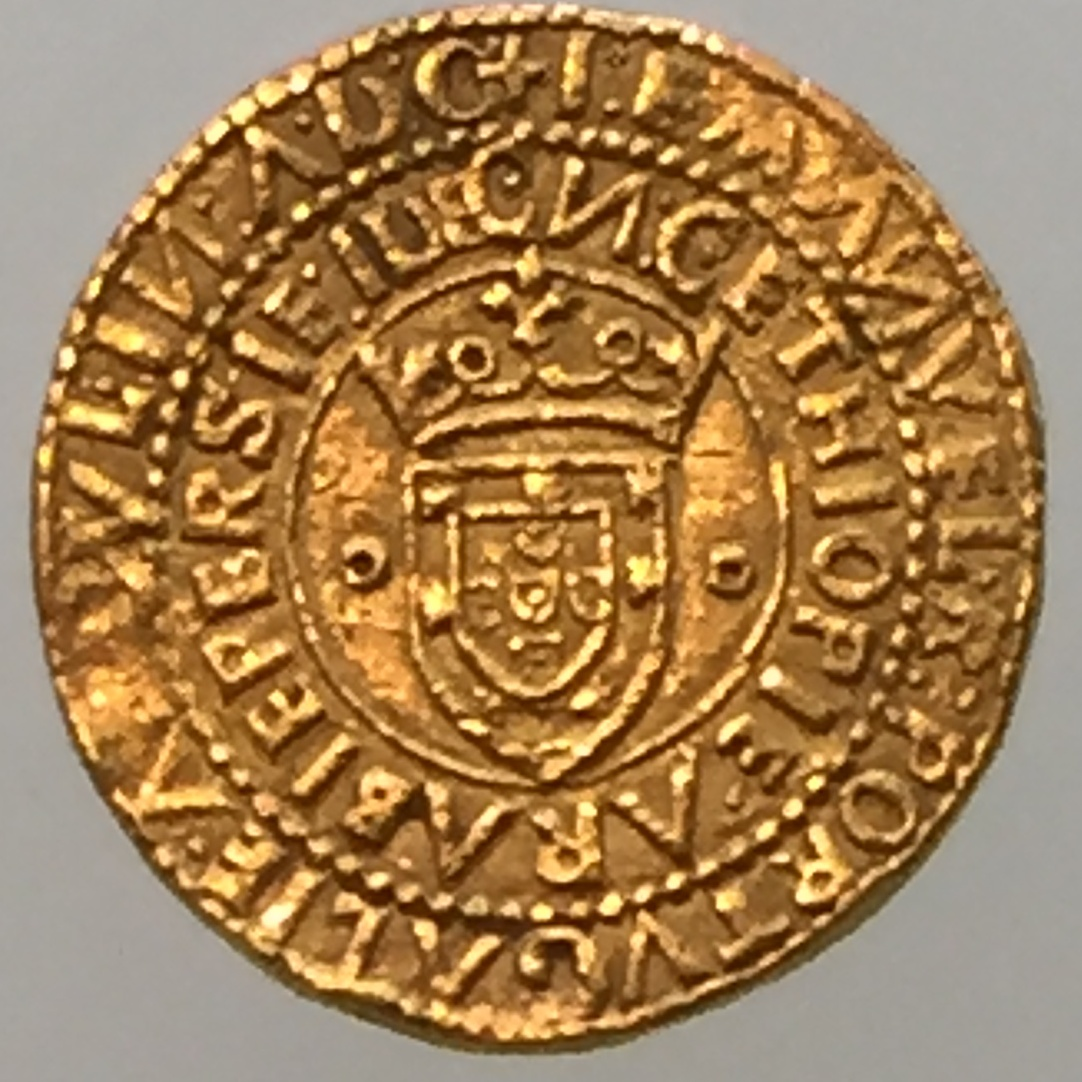
16th century português from the reign of King Manuel.

- Manueline, an architectural style named after Manuel
- Portugal in the Age of Discovery
- Português
- Royal Palace of Évora

== Sources ==
- Livermore, H.V. (1976). A New History of Portugal. Cambridge University Press. ISBN 9780521095716.
- Marques, Antonio Henrique R. de Oliveira (1976). History of Portugal. New York: Columbia University Press. ISBN 0-231-08353-X.
- McMurdo, Edward (1889). The history of Portugal, from the Commencement of the Monarchy to the Reign of Alfonso III. London: Sampson Low, Marston, Searle, & Rivington.
- Newitt, M. D. D (2005). A History of Portuguese Overseas Expansion, 1400-1668. New York: Routledge.
- Pereira, Esteves; Rodrigues, Guilherme (1904). Portugal: diccionario historico, chorographico, heraldico, biographico, bibliographico, numismatico e artistico (in Portuguese). Vol. 4. Lisboa: J. Romano Torres. pp. 800–803.
- Rebelo, Luis (2003). "Manuel I, King of Portugal". In Gerli, E. Michael (ed.). Medieval Iberia : an encyclopedia. New York: Routledge. ISBN 0-415-93918-6.
- Sanceau, Elaine (1970). Reign of the Fortunate King, 1495–1521: Manuel I of Portugal. Hamden, Conn.: Archon Books. ISBN 0-2080096-8-X.
- Smith, Robert C. (1968). The Art of Portugal, 1500-1800. New York: Meredith Press.
- Stephens, H. Morse (1891). The Story of Portugal. New York: G. P. Putnam's Sons.
- Buescu, Ana Isabel (2019). D. Beatriz de Portugal (1504-1538). A Infanta Esquecida (in Portuguese). Lisbon: Manuscrito.

Manuel I of Portugal House of Aviz Cadet branch of the House of Burgundy Born: 31 May 1469 Died: 13 December 1521
Regnal titles
Preceded by João II	King of Portugal; 1495–1521	Succeeded by João III
Portuguese royalty
Preceded by Afonso	Prince of Portugal; 1491–1495	Succeeded by Miguel de Paz
Preceded by Diogo	Duke of Beja; 1484–1495	Vacant Title next held by Luís
Preceded by Diogo	Duke of Viseu; 1484–1495	Vacant Title next held by Maria
