= Ferdinand, Duke of Viseu =

Duke of Viseu and Beja (1433–1470)

Infante Ferdinand
- Duke of Viseu and Beja
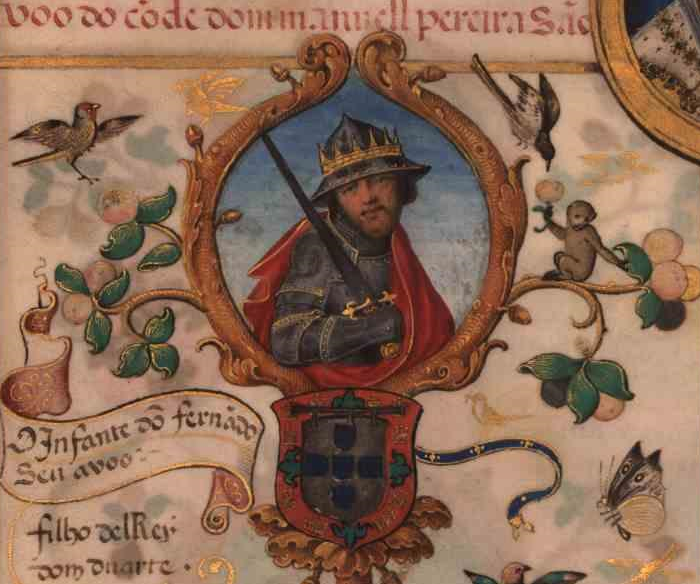
- Born: 17 November 1433; Almeirim
- Died: 18 September 1470 (aged 36); Setúbal
- Spouse: Beatrice of Portugal
- Issue: John, Duke of Viseu; Diogo, Duke of Viseu; Eleanor, Queen of Portugal; Isabella, Duchess of Braganza; Manuel I, King of Portugal
- House: Aviz
- Father: Edward, King of Portugal
- Mother: Eleanor of Aragon

Infante Ferdinand, Duke of Viseu and Beja (or Fernando, Portuguese pronunciation: [fɨɾˈnɐ̃du], 17 November 1433 – 18 September 1470) was the third son of Edward, King of Portugal, and Eleanor of Aragon.

== Biography ==
Ferdinand was born in Almeirim on 17 November 1433, and died in Setúbal on 18 September 1470.

He was twice sworn Prince of Portugal (title granted to the presumptive heir to the throne): first between 1438 and 1451, once his older brother became king Afonso V of Portugal and had no children; and for the second time, in 1451, when Prince João was born, but died months later.

When Afonso V's first daughter, Princess Joan, was born (1452), Infante Ferdinand finally lost this title.

In 1452, Ferdinand fled the country looking for adventure. Some say he wanted to go to the north African cities controlled by the Portuguese; others say that he wanted to join his uncle, the King Alfonso I of Naples, in his campaigns in southern Italy. It seems Ferdinand had the hope to inherit his uncle's kingdom, as he had no legitimate children.

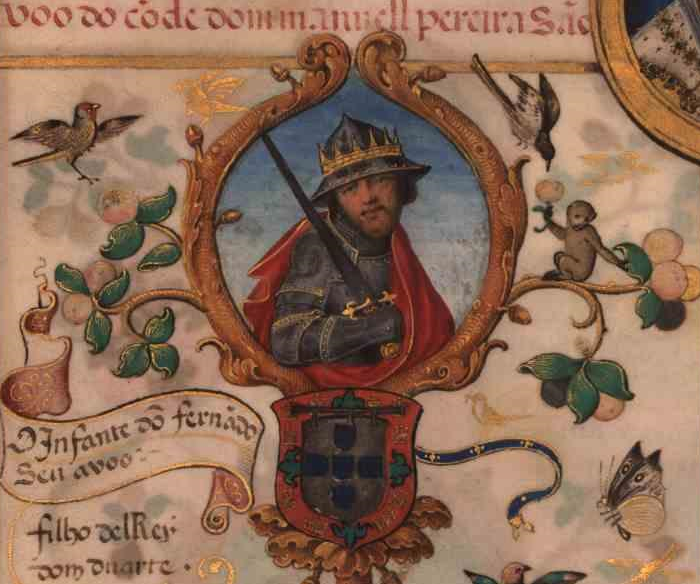
Ferdinand in a 1534 miniature in the Genealogy of D. Manuel Pereira, 3rd Count of Feira.

However, his brother, King Afonso V of Portugal, as soon as he knew about Ferdinand's escape, ordered to the Count of Odemira, which was patrolling the strait of Gibraltar with a fleet, to intercept the infante's ship and bring him back to mainland Portugal.

=== Duke of Beja and Viseu ===
In 1453, his brother, King Afonso V of Portugal granted him the title of 1st Duke of Beja.

When his uncle, Prince Henry died, in 1460, he also became 2nd Duke of Viseu as well. He also succeeded his uncle as Master of the Order of Christ and responsible for the Discoveries (1460–1470).

He was finally allowed to fight in north Africa: first in 1458 he escorted the king to the conquest of the Moroccan city of Alcácer Ceguer; and for a second time, in 1468, he led a Portuguese fleet that conquered and destroyed the port of Anfa (Anafé in Portuguese), today included in Casablanca, which was a barbary corsairs base.

He was buried in the Religiosas da Conceição monastery, in Beja, founded by his wife.

=== Marriage and children ===
He married his cousin Beatrice of Portugal (Portuguese: Beatriz) in 1447, daughter of Infante João, Lord of Reguengos (his uncle). From this marriage, Ferdinand had nine children:

- Infante João (1448–1472), 3rd Duke of Viseu, 2nd Duke of Beja, 7th Constable of Portugal;
- Infante Diogo (1450–1484), 4th Duke of Viseu, 3rd Duke of Beja;
- Infanta Eleanor of Viseu (1458–1525), married to King John II of Portugal, becoming Queen of Portugal;
- Infanta Isabella of Viseu (1459–1521), married to Ferdinand II, Duke of Braganza;
- Infante Duarte of Viseu (1462–1476 or after);
- Infante Simão of Viseu (died in 1465/1470);
- Infanta Catarina of Viseu (1465–bef.1470);
- Infante Dinis of Viseu (1468–bef.1470);
- Infante Manuel (1469–1521), 5th Duke of Viseu, 4th Duke of Beja. Became King of Portugal, as Manuel I, following his cousin's (John II) death.

== Ancestry ==
Ancestors of Ferdinand, Duke of Viseu

8. Peter I of Portugal
4. John I of Portugal
9. Teresa Lourenço
2. Edward I of Portugal
10. John of Gaunt, 1st Duke of Lancaster
5. Philippa of Lancaster
11. Blanche of Lancaster
1. Ferdinand, Duke of Viseu
12. John I of Castile
6. Ferdinand I of Aragon
13. Eleanor of Aragon
3. Eleanor of Aragon
14. Sancho Alfonso
7. Eleanor of Alburquerque
15. Beatrice of Portugal

== See also ==
- Duke of Beja
- Duke of Viseu
- Dukedoms in Portugal

== Bibliography ==
”Nobreza de Portugal e do Brasil" – Vol. I, pages 311 and 312. Published by Zairol Lda., Lisbon 1989.

Ferdinand, Duke of Viseu House of Aviz Cadet branch of the House of Burgundy Born: 17 November 1433 Died: ? 1470
Portuguese royalty
Preceded by Afonso who became Afonso V	Prince of Portugal; 1438–1451	Succeeded by John
Preceded by John	Prince of Portugal; 1451–1452	Succeeded by Joanna
Portuguese nobility
New title	Duke of Beja; 1453–1470	Succeeded by John
Preceded by Henry	Duke of Viseu; 1460–1470	Succeeded by John
