= Duke of Beja =

Aristocratic Portuguese title and royal dukedom

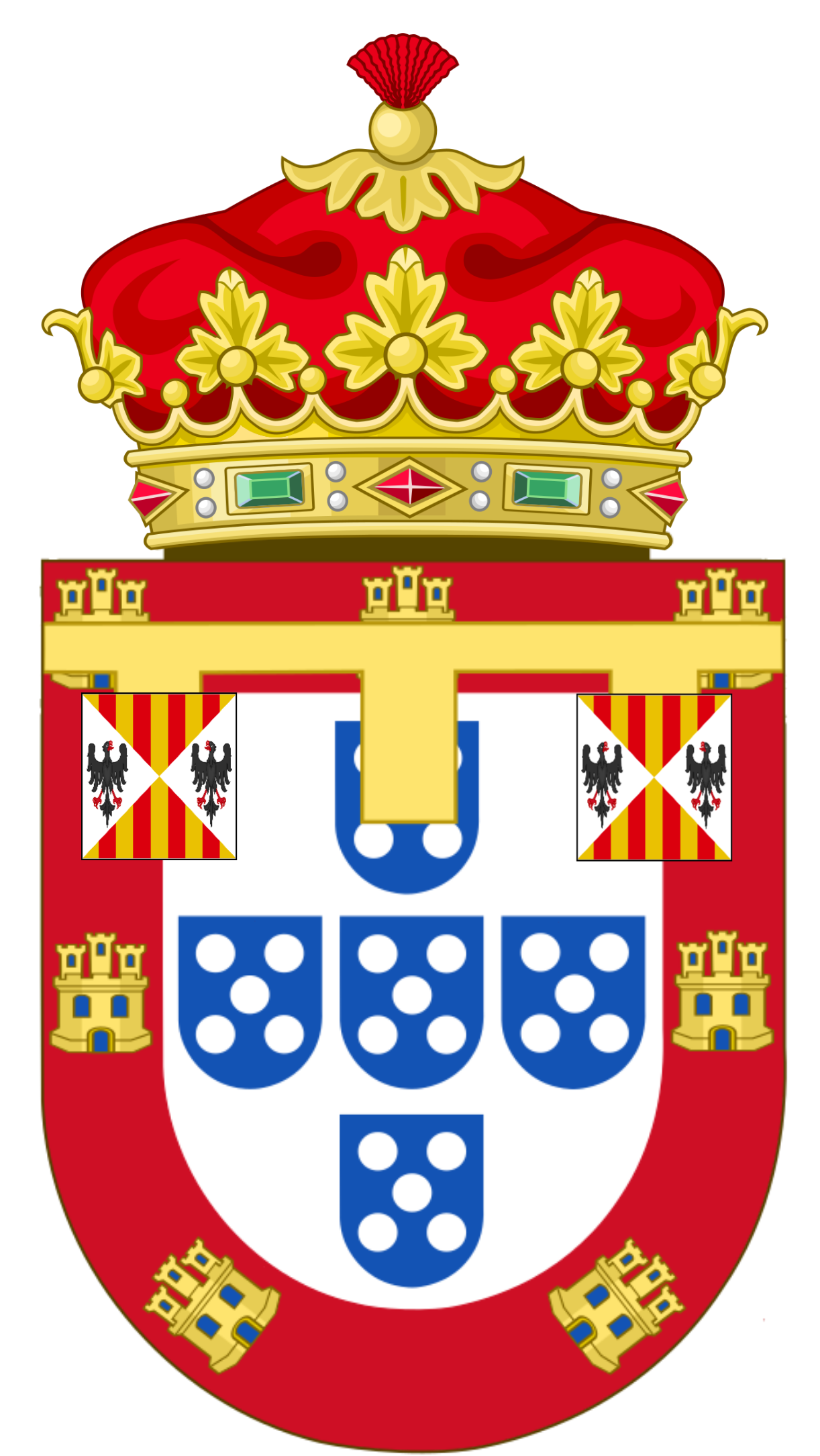
The Coat of Arms of the Dukes of Beja.

Personal Coat of Arms of Infante Luis, 5th Duke of Beja.

Duke of Beja (Portuguese: Duque de Beja) was an aristocratic Portuguese title and royal dukedom, associated with the Portuguese Royal House.

== List of dukes of Beja ==
1. Infante Fernando, 2nd Duke of Viseu (1433–1470), King Duarte I's third son (second surviving);
2. Infante João, 3rd Duke of Viseu (1448–1472), Infante Fernando's eldest son;
3. Infante Diogo, 4th Duke of Viseu (1450–1484), Infante Fernando's second son;
4. King Manuel I (1469–1521), Infante Fernando's seventh son (third surviving);
5. Infante Luís, Duke of Beja (1506–1555), King Manuel I's second son of his second marriage; father of King António I;
6. King Pedro II (1648–1706), King João IV's fourth son (second surviving in 1654);
7. Infante Francisco, Duke of Beja (1691–1742), King Pedro II's third son (second surviving);
8. King Pedro III (1717–1786), King João V's fourth son (second surviving in 1742);
9. King João VI (1767–1826), Queen Maria I's and King Pedro III's third son (second surviving in 1786);
10. King Miguel I (1802–1866), King João VI's third son (second surviving in 1816);
11. Infante João, Duke of Beja (1842–1861), Queen Maria II's third son;
12. King Manuel II (1889–1932), King Carlos I's second son.

== See also ==
- Dukedoms in Portugal
