= House of Abrantes =

Portuguese nobility

House of Abrantes Casa de Abrantes
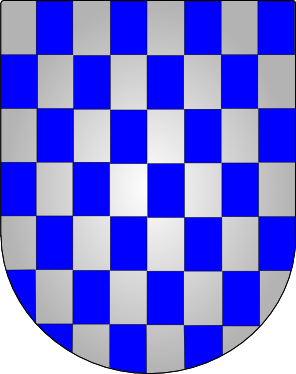
- Parent house: House of Almeida
- Founded: June 13, 1476; 550 years ago
- Founder: Lopo de Almeida
- Current head: José Maria da Piedade de Lancastre e Tavora
- Titles: Duke of Abrantes; Marquess of Abrantes; Marquess of Fontes; Count of Vila Nova de Portimão; Count of Penaguião; Count of Abrantes; Count of Matosinhos; Count of São João da Foz
- Estate: of Portugal
- Cadet branches: House of Lancastre e Távora

The House of Abrantes (Portuguese: Casa de Abrantes) descends from the ancient and noble Almeida family.

King Afonso V granted the land around Abrantes to his cousin, Lopo de Almeida, 1st Count of Abrantes in 1476. The title and lands descended in the Almeida family until 1650 when its male line expired and the estate reverted to the Crown.

The estate and noble title were granted to the Sá family, Counts of Penaguião in 1718 and devolved via the Lancastres, Counts of Vila Nova, now represented by the Lancastre e Távora branch of the family.

== The Counts of Abrantes ==
In 1476, King Afonso V of Portugal granted Dom Lopo de Almeida, a descendant of King Pedro I of Portugal through an illegitimate line, the title of Count of Abrantes, which became extinct when Dom Miguel de Almeida, 4th Count of Abrantes and a Restoration hero, died without issue.

When Isabel de Mendonça, the Count of Abrantes’ heir, married João Rodrigues de Sá, 1st Count of Penaguião, the Count of Abrantes revived for the Sá family.

== The Marquesses of Abrantes ==
In 1659, King Afonso VI granted Francisco de Sá e Menezes (1640–1677), 4th Count of Penaguião, the new title of 1st Marquess of Fontes, which was replaced in 1718 with the title of Marquess of Abrantes according to King John V’s decree.

== The Duchesses of Abrantes ==
Twice, on exceptional occasions, the title of Duchess of Abrantes was granted to two Marchionesses of Abrantes upon becoming the Queen of Portugal's Maid of Honour (in Portuguese Camareiras-Môr), the highest court position for a lady:

- In 1753, King Joseph I of Portugal granted the 3rd Marchioness of Abrantes, Ana Maria Catarina Henriqueta de Lorena, the title of Duchess of Abrantes for life.
- In 1757, her daughter, Maria Margarida de Lorena, 4th Marchioness of Abrantes, was created Duchess of Abrantes also for life.

== House of Lancastre e Távora ==
Coat of arms of the House of Lancastre e Távora

When Maria Margarida, Duchess of Abrantes died without issue in 1780, the Abrantes estates and titles were inherited by the Lancastre family, Counts of Vila Nova de Portimão (who descended from infante George of Lencastre, 2nd Duke of Coimbra).

The union of Isabel de Lancastre e Menezes with Manuel Rafael de Távora formed the Lencastre e Távora (or Lancastre e Távora) family, the current representatives of the noble title. Dom José Maria da Piedade de Lencastre e Távora (born 1960) is the 11th and present Marquess of Abrantes.

== Titles used by members of the House of Abrantes ==
- Count of Abrantes - granted by King Afonso V in 1476, but became extinct in 1650 when the 4th Count died without issue;
- Count of Vila Nova de Portimão - granted by King Manuel I in 1504;
- Count of Matosinhos e São João da Foz - granted by the Cardinal-King Henry I in 1580;
- Count of Penaguião - granted by King Philip I in 1583;
- Marquess of Fontes - granted by King Afonso VI in 1659 and absorbed into the marquisate of Abrantes in 1718;
- Marquess of Abrantes - granted by King John V in 1718;
- Duchess of Abrantes - granted by King Joseph I in 1753 and again 1757 as dukedoms for life; the title expired in 1780.

== The Palace of Santos ==
The Palace of Santos, or Palace of the Marquesses of Abrantes, where the French embassy is located in Lisbon, resulted from a major historical and architectural evolution.

The name "Santos" refers to three Christian martyrs executed on the top of a Lisbon hill and, in 589, when the Visigoth King Reccared I converted to Christianity, a temple in remembrance of the three saints was built there; it was later destroyed. Following the conquest of Lisbon, King Afonso I of Portugal rebuilt the church and gave it to the Order of Santiago, which made it their headquarters.

When the knights left to the Reconquista, the building was converted on the south into a noble ladies' convent (the Comendadeiras). In 1490, they abandoned the building in favor of a new convent, and the building then took the name of Santos-o-Velho (in Portuguese, literally, "the old Santos").

In 1497, under King Manuel I of Portugal, the building was transformed into a royal residence due to its unique location facing the Tagus river and between the centre of Lisbon and the new area of Belém. It was frequently used by Kings Manuel I, John III and Sebastian. In 1510, Gil Vicente presented some of his plays (in Portuguese: autos) there, and from that location King Sebastian of Portugal left to join the Battle of Alcácer Quibir.

Following Alcácer Quibir, the palace was abandoned and, in 1629, it was acquired by Francisco Luís de Lencastre, 3rd high-Commendator (in Portuguese Comendador-Môr) of the Order of Aviz, a descendant of infante George of Lencastre (natural son of King John II), and it was kept in the family for the next 300 years. Meanwhile, the family also inherited the title of Marquess of Abrantes.

It is not known how extensively the palace was damaged by the 1755 earthquake, but several relatives took shelter there at the time.

In the beginning of the 19th century, the palace was restored and the façade was rebuilt, which gave greater dignity to the building. In 1833, the infanta Ana de Jesus Maria and her husband, the 1st Duke of Loulé, rented part of the palace, as did Amélie de Beauharnais (widow of Pedro I of Brazil), who lived there between 1841 and 1849.

Following the death of the 8th Marquess in 1870, the palace was rented to Count Armand, French Minister in Lisbon, who established legation services there. The French government finally acquired the building in 1909.

Today, the rooms are decorated with paintings and tiles and house an excellent furniture collection dating from the 17th and 18th centuries. Special attention was given to the pyramidal roof room, which was completely covered with porcelains, and to the chapel tiles, which date from the 16th century.

The gardens provide a view over the Tagus. Visitors are welcome, depending on availability in accord with the needs of the embassy of France, which usually opens some rooms to public viewing on International Museum Day (18 May).

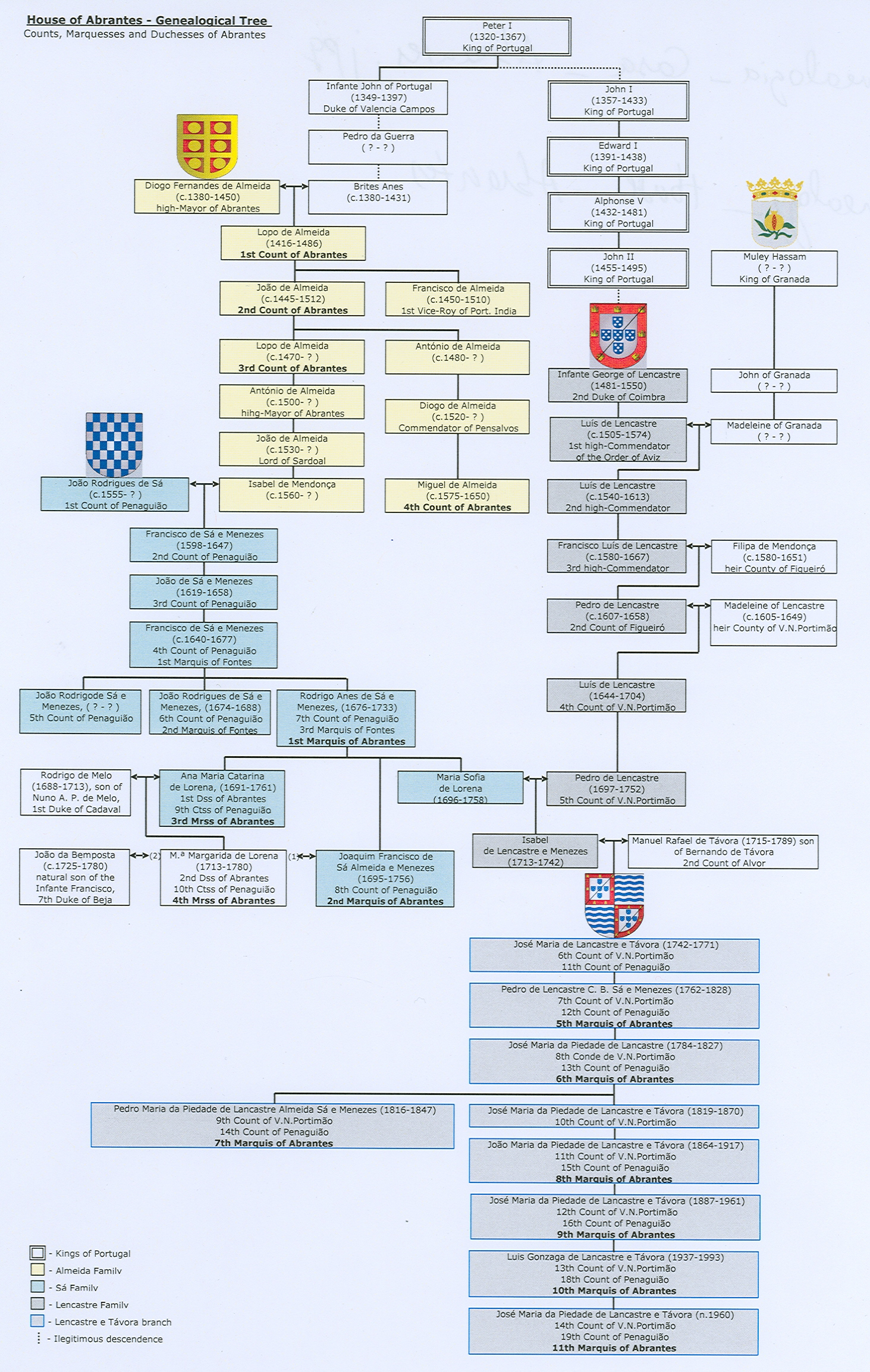

== See also ==
- Abrantes
- Count of Abrantes
- Marquess of Abrantes
- Duke of Abrantes

== Bibliography ==
"Nobreza de Portugal e do Brazil" – Vol. II, pages 203/205. Zairol Lda., Lisbon 1989.
