= Marquis of Abrantes =

Portuguese nobility

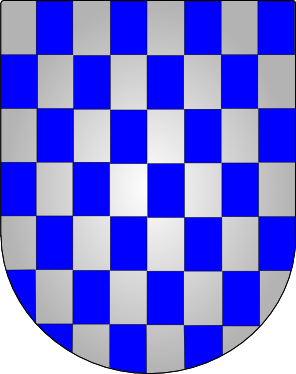
Coat of Arms of the Sá family, Marquesses and Dukes of Abrantes.

Marquess of Abrantes (in Portuguese Marquês de Abrantes) was a Portuguese title of nobility, granted by a decree issued by King John V of Portugal on 24 June 1718, to Rodrigo Anes de Sá Almeida e Menezes, 3rd Marquess of Fontes and 7th Count of Penaguião.

On that date, Rodrigo's title was changed, by King John V of Portugal, from Marquess of Fontes to Marquess of Abrantes, since he descended, in the female line, from the prestigious Counts of Abrantes, an old line rendered extinct on the death of the fourth count, Miguel de Almeida, in 1650.

Two of the Marchioness of Abrantes had their title upgraded to the rank of duchess during their livetimes, when they became the queen's First Lady of the Bedchamber (Camareira-Mor), the highest palatine office for a lady.

== List of marquesses of Abrantes (1718) ==
1. D. Rodrigo Anes de Sá Almeida e Menezes (1676-1733), also 3rd Marquess of Fontes and 7th Count of Penaguião;
2. D. Joaquim Francisco de Sá Almeida e Menezes (1695-1756), his son, 8th Count of Penaguião;
3. D. Ana Maria Catarina Henriqueta de Lorena (1691-1761), his sister, 9th Countess of Penaguião, became 1st Duchess of Abrantes in 1753;
4. D. Maria Margarida de Lorena (1713-1780), her daughter, 10th Countess of Penaguião and 2nd Duchess of Abrantes;
5. D. Pedro de Lancastre da Silveira de Castelo-Branco Sá e Menezes (1762-1828), her 3rd cousin, also 12th Count of Penaguião and 7th Count of Vila Nova de Portimão;
6. D. José Maria da Piedade de Lancastre (1784-1827), also 13th Count of Penaguião and 8th Count of Vila Nova de Portimão;
7. D. Pedro Maria da Piedade de Lancastre Almeida Sá Menezes (1816-1847), also 14th Count of Penaguião and 9th Count of Vila Nova de Portimão;
8. D. João Maria da Piedade de Lancastre e Tavora (1864-1917), also 15th Count of Penaguião and 11th Count of Vila Nova de Portimão;
9. D. José Maria da Piedade de Lancastre e Tavora (1887-1961), also 16th Count of Penaguião and 12th Count of Vila Nova de Portimão;
10. D. Luis Gonzaga de Lancastre e Tavora (1937-1993), also 17th Count of Penaguião, 13th Count of Vila Nova de Portimão and 14th Marquess of Fontes;
11. D. José Maria da Piedade de Lancastre e Tavora (born 1960), also 18th Count of Penaguião, 14th Count of Vila Nova de Portimão and 15th Marquess of Fontes.

== Other titles ==
- Count of Vila Nova de Portimão, on 28 May 1504, by a royal decree of King Manuel I of Portugal;
- Count of Penaguião, on 10 February 1583, by royal decree of King Philip I of Portugal;
- Marquess of Fontes, on 2 January 1659, by royal decree of King Afonso VI of Portugal;
- Duke of Abrantes, on 9 December 1753, by a royal decree of King Joseph I of Portugal.

== See also ==
- House of Abrantes
- Duke of Abrantes
- Count of Abrantes
- Dukedoms in Portugal
- List of marquisates in Portugal

== Bibliography ==
”Nobreza de Portugal e do Brasil" – Vol. II, pages 203/208. Published by Zairol Lda., Lisbon 1989.
