= Marquess of Fontes =

Defunct Portuguese noble title

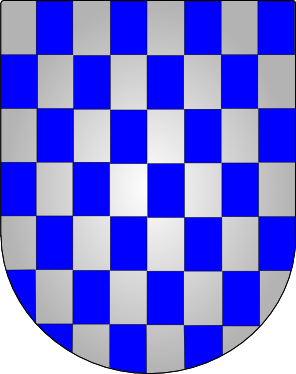
Coat of Arms of the Sá family, Marquesses of Fontes.

Marquess of Fontes (in Portuguese Marquês de Fontes) was a Portuguese title of nobility, granted by a decree issued by King Afonso VI of Portugal on 2 January 1659, to D. Francisco de Sá e Menezes, 3rd Count of Penaguião.

On 24 June 1718, the 3rd Marquess of Fontes, Rodrigo Anes de Sá Almeida e Menezes, had his title changed, by King John V of Portugal, to Marquess of Abrantes, once he descended, by female line, from the prestigious Counts of Abrantes, an old line already extinct.

== List of marquesses of Fontes (1659) ==
1. Francisco de Sá e Menezes (c.1640-1677), also 4th Count of Penaguião;
2. João Rodrigues de Sá Menezes (1674-1688), his son, also 6th Count of Penaguião;
3. Rodrigo Anes de Sá Almeida e Menezes (1676-1733), his brother, also 7th Count of Penaguião. He became 1st Marquess of Abrantes in 1718.

== See also ==
- Marquess of Abrantes
- List of marquisates in Portugal

== Bibliography ==
”Nobreza de Portugal e do Brasil" – Vol. II, page 614. Published by Zairol Lda., Lisbon 1989.
