= Rodrigo Anes de Sá Almeida e Meneses, 1st Marquis of Abrantes =

Portuguese nobleman and diplomat

His Excellency The Marquis of Abrantes
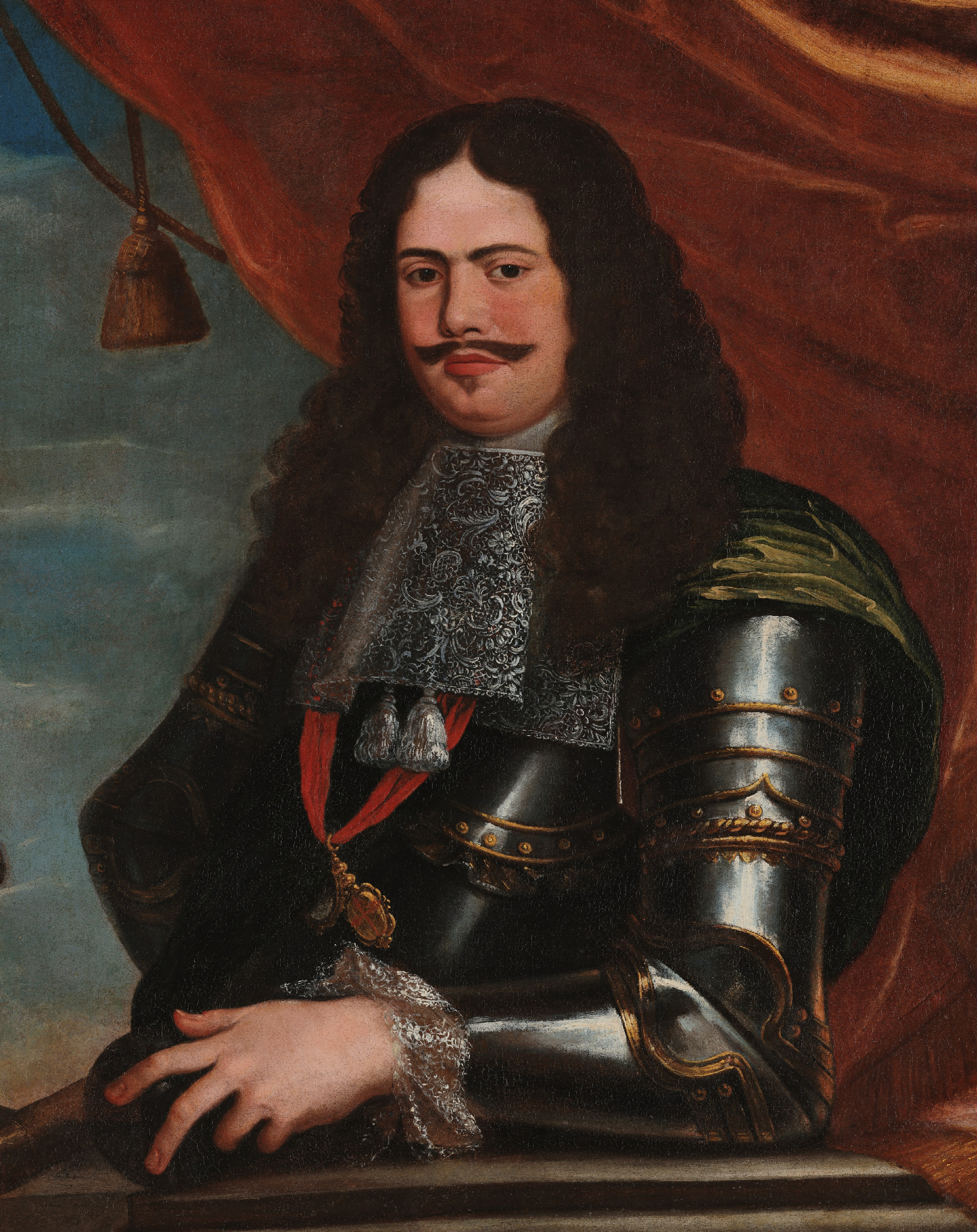

Portuguese Ambassador to the Holy See
- In office 1712–1718
- Monarch: John V of Portugal
- Preceded by: André de Melo e Castro
- Succeeded by: The Count of Galveias

Portuguese Ambassador to Spain
- In office 1727–1729
- Monarch: John V of Portugal
- Preceded by: José da Cunha Brochado
- Succeeded by: Manuel Ribeiro

Personal details
- Born: Rodrigo Anes de Sá Almeida e Meneses; 19 October 1676 Lisbon, Portugal
- Died: 30 April 1733 (aged 56) Abrantes, Portugal

D. Rodrigo Anes de Sá Almeida e Meneses, 1st Marquis of Abrantes (19 October 1676 – 30 April 1733), before 1718 titled 3rd Marquis of Fontes and 7th Count of Penaguião, was a Portuguese nobleman and diplomat.

The Marquis of Abrantes enjoyed a significant international projection in the first half of the 18th century, first in the service of King Peter II but mainly in that of his son and successor King John V. While acting as the king's representative in the Papal Court, and afterwards in the Spanish Court, he was a major player in two significant events in the history of Portuguese diplomacy: the Embassy to Pope Clement XI in 1716, and the Exchange of the Princesses in 1729.

== Early life ==
D. Rodrigo was the third-born and youngest son of D. Francisco de Sá e Meneses, 1st Marquis of Fontes and 4th Count of Penaguião (c.1640–1677) and his wife D. Joana Luísa de Lancastre. He was baptised by his uncle D. Luís de Sousa, Cardinal-Archbishop of Lisbon. After his father's death in 1677, the Dowager Marchioness took up the responsibility of overseeing the education of her children: she envisioned a career in Letters for D. Rodrigo, accordingly, she assigned to him the distinguished Latinist scholar Inácio da Silva as a teacher.

The Dowager Marchioness's plans changed drastically after her two eldest sons died; at age 12, in 1688, D. Rodrigo succeeded his brother as head of the illustrious and powerful of his forebears. In 1690, D. Joana had him married to the daughter of the Duke of Cadaval, D. Isabel Henriqueta de Lorena, who had originally been promised to D. Rodrigo's brother.
Four children were born of this union:

- D. Ana Maria Catarina Henrique de Lorena (1691–1761),
- D. Joaquim Francisco de Sá Almeida e Meneses, 2nd Marquis of Abrantes (1695–1756), no issue,
- D. Maria Sofia de Lancastre (1696–1758),
- D. Luísa Maria de Faro (1697–1697).

The marriage was cut short by D. Isabel's illness and death on 26 November 1699.

After his widowerhood, the Marquis of Fontes became more directly involved in the service of the King. During the War of the Spanish Succession, as Peter II of Portugal allied himself with the English and the Germans to prevent a dynastic union between France and Spain under Philip, Duke of Anjou, the Marquis of Fontes served as mestre de camp of the Old Tercio of Setúbal from 1703 to 1706. While in command of this infantry unit, the Marquis had them in new military uniforms at his own expense, generously fed his men, and opted to lodge himself in monasteries to which he would then leave substantial tithes.

== Embassy to Pope Clement XI ==
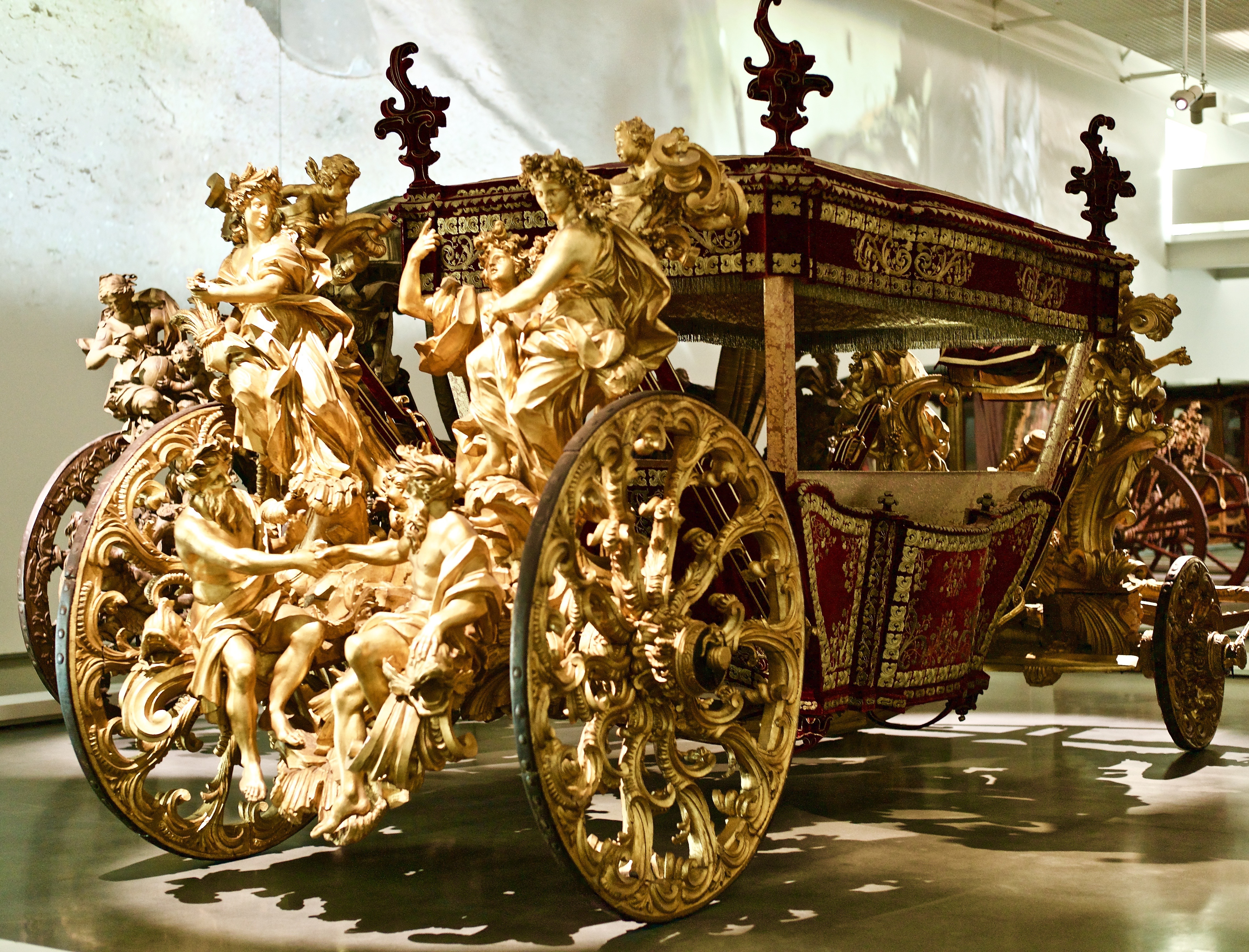
The Coach of the Oceans

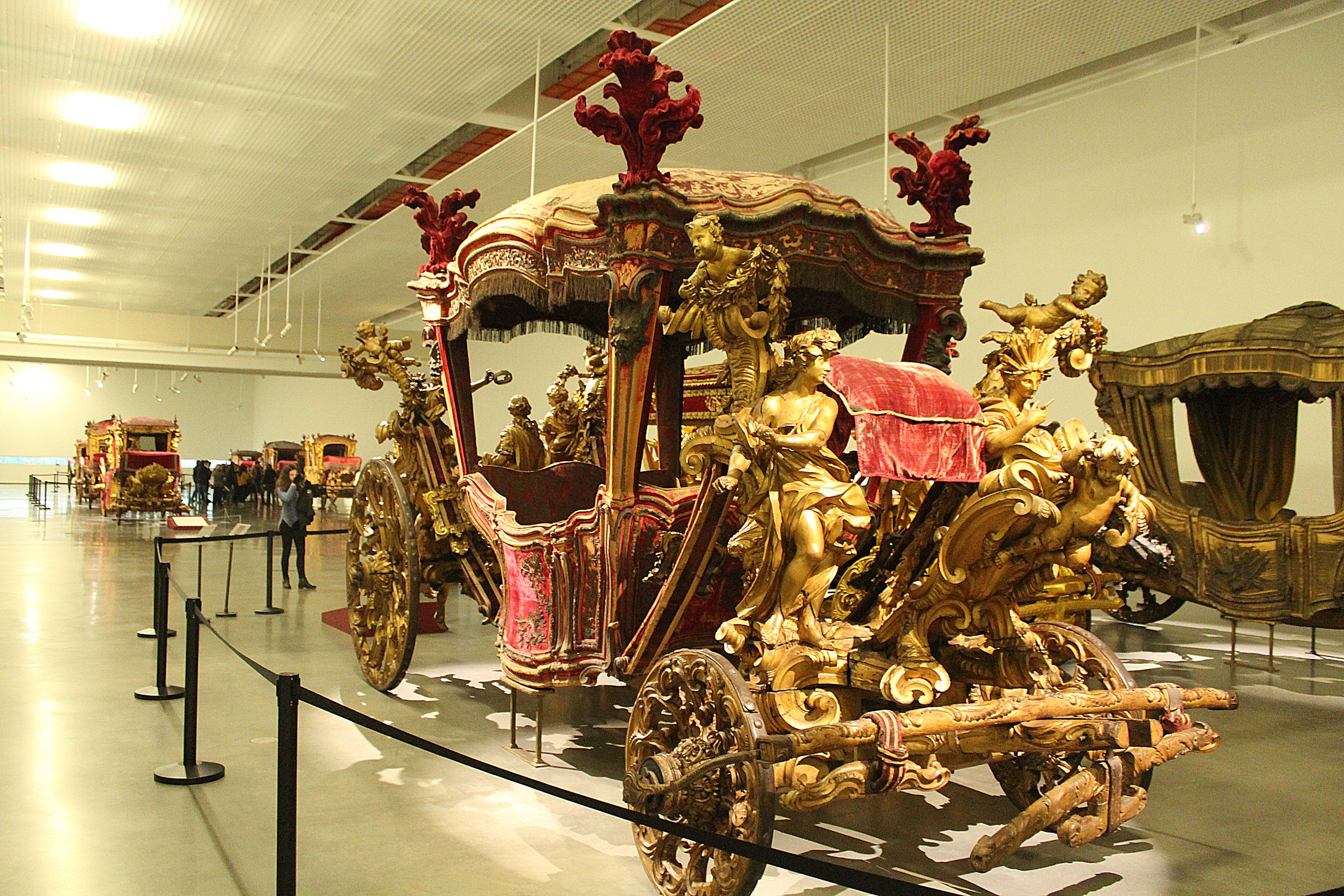
The Coach of the Coronation of Lisbon

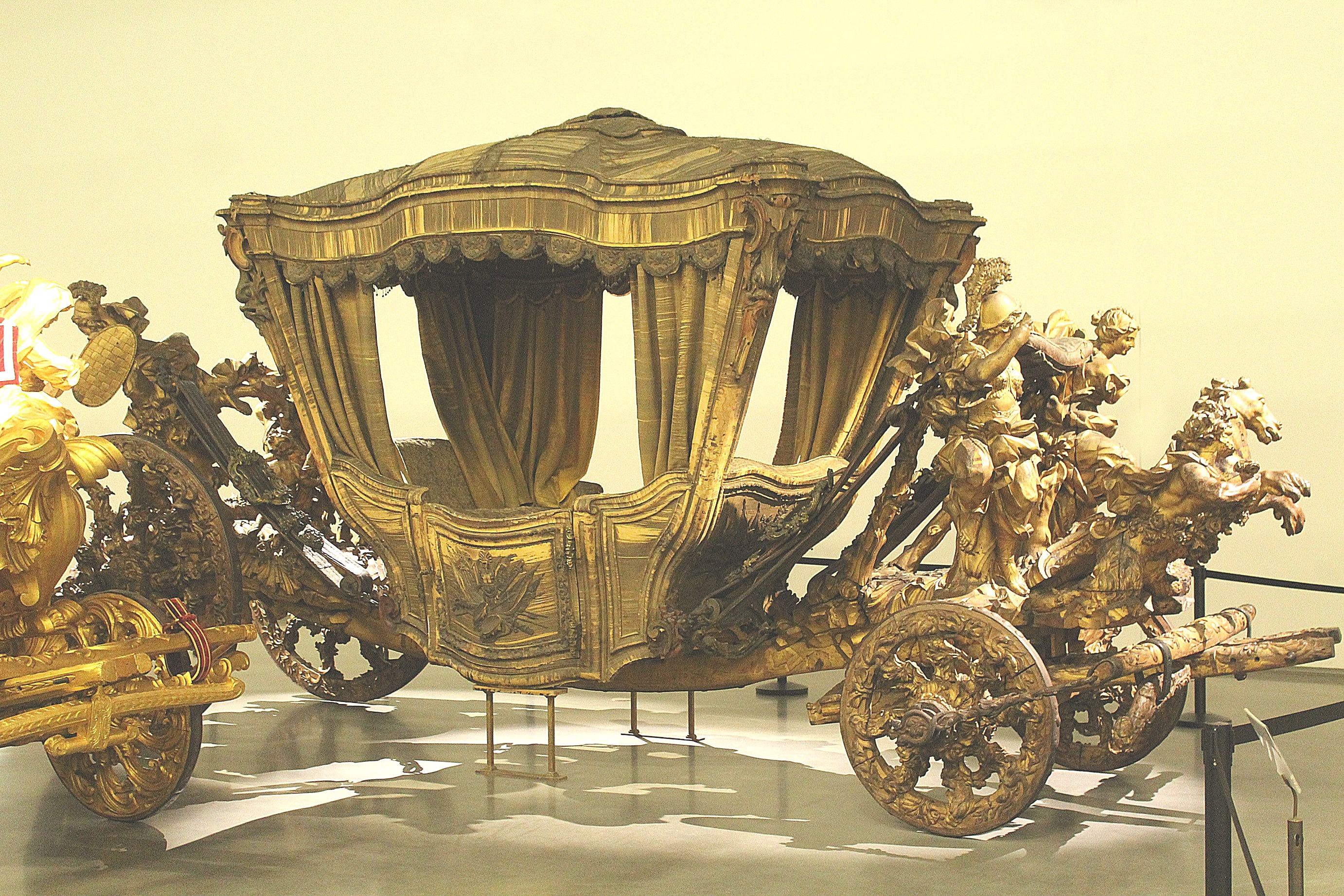
The Coach of the Ambassador

The three surviving triumphal carriages that were part of the procession of the Solemn Entrance of the Marquis of Fontes in the Papal Court, kept today in the National Coach Museum, Lisbon

The Marquis of Fontes was selected to carry out the important task of ambassador extraordinary of John V of Portugal to the Holy See, as befitting his long familial tradition of diplomatic service. This was a important mission, since the reign of John V was characterized by sustained cultural activity, generally seen as the apex of Absolutism and Baroque culture in the Portuguese Empire, promoting the image of the monarch as a protector of the arts and sciences, while at the same time presenting the country's imperial ideal.

The Marquis of Fontes left for Genoa on 9 January 1712, aboard the carrack La Madonna delle Vigne, commanded by Giovanni Lorenzo Viviani, accompanied by his family and protegés such as the young painter Vieira Lusitano. After a turbulent and stormy voyage (especially while crossing the Gulf of Lion, which motivated a landing in Cagliari in Sardinia, from where passengers and crew made a brief barefoot procession to the Shrine of Our Lady of Fair Winds where the Marquis left a gold ingot worth 500 thousand réis as votive offering), they reached their destination on 30 March. They stayed in Genoa for over a month and a half, and embarked to Livorno on 17 May, where they arrived the following day. Travelling the rest of the route by land, they arrived in Rome on 21 May 1712, in time to attend, the following day, the Canonisation Mass of Saints Catherine of Bologna, Pope Pius V, Andrew Avellino, and Felix of Cantalice. The Marquis first stayed with the Portuguese envoy in Rome, André de Melo e Castro, but afterwards rented a house in Piazza Colonna.

Even though the ambassador was in Rome, his solemn public entry was delayed for four years due to a long waiting list for such public entries in Rome; the Marquis of Fontes made use of this setback to carefully prepare the lavish ceremony. During this time, he cultivated an important friendship with Cardinal Annibale Albani, nephew of Pope Clement XI, who received from the Marquis a lavish gift of precious objects from Brazil and India, as well as a set of Chinese and Japanese porcelain, symbolic of the span and importance of the Portuguese Empire.

The Marquis of Fontes made his public entrance in Rome on 8 July 1716, on a parade of an unusually splendid scale. The rules of protocol were scrupulously observed and the total number of carriages employed for the procession led by the ambassador comprised five state coaches (three of which survive in the collections of the National Coach Museum, in Lisbon), and 10 other processional vehicles — thus exceeding the requisite 12 officially stipulated. The richly decorated carriages were complete with monumental gilded sculptures that in effect sought to celebrate the Portuguese overseas victories in battle as a means of spreading the Roman Catholic faith to pagan nations, to demonstrate the riches enjoyed by Portugal, and, most importantly, to affirm before the Pope and the foreign ambassadors at the Papal Court that Portugal was already an old imperial power whose possessions dated from before the emergence of other European colonial powers. By celebrating the Portuguese feats in the Indian Ocean with such great splendour, at a time when the main European powers — Great Britain, France, The Netherlands — were competing for India, the Embassy of the Marquis of Fontes was successful effort to contradict the perception that most Europeans had of the decline of the Portuguese possessions in India and present Portugal as a strong imperial power.

There is suggestive evidence that the Marquis of Fontes himself took a direct personal interest in the decorative programme of the processional carriages.

After the parade, the Marquis of Fontes received "great demonstrations of benevolence and joy" from Pope Clement XI before kneeling to kiss his slippers. The ambassador then formally presented his letter of credence, relayed the Pope news of the birth of a new Infante of Portugal (Carlos of Braganza), and gave a full account of "the powerful rescue that [King John] was sending to defend Italy, formidably threatened by the Ottoman might".

The Embassy of the Marquis of Fontes was a resounding success. Having impressed the papal court, Pope Clement XI raised the dignity of the Archdiocese of Lisbon to the Patriarchate of Lisbon, making the Portuguese capital only one of two dioceses with this title in Europe, alongside Venice. King John's good fortune with the papacy and Italy would continue to raise the next year, in 1717, when the aid of a Portuguese squadron of ships helped win the Battle of Matapan, in the ongoing Ottoman-Venetian War.

== Later life ==
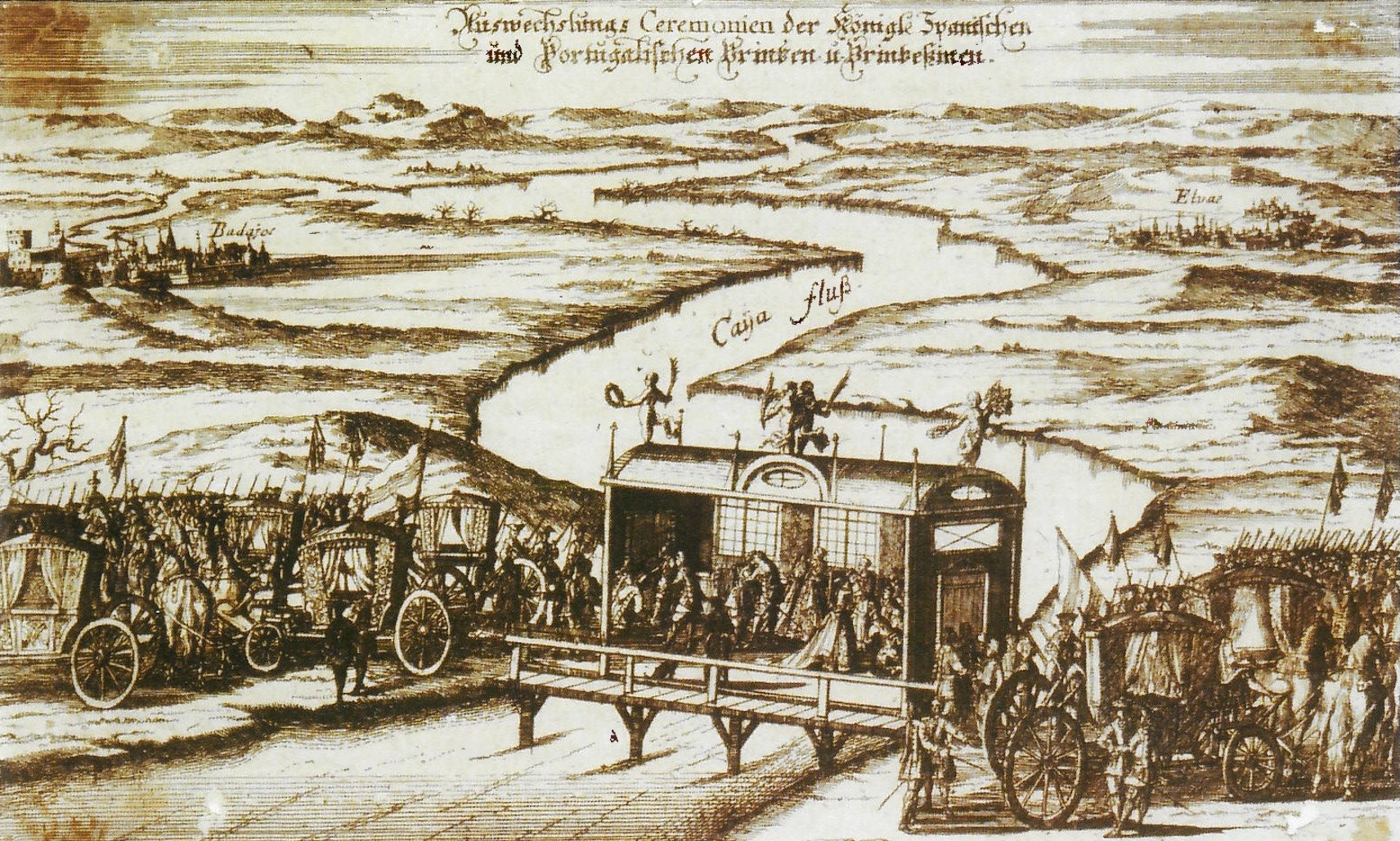
Contemporary engraving depicting the Exchange of the Princesses over the Caia River on the Portugal–Spain border

Upon his return from Lisbon, by Royal Decree of 24 June 1718, D. Rodrigo Anes de Sá was made Marquis of Abrantes, and the title was conferred the additional privilege of Honours of Kin to the King (an official acknowledgement of the blood relationship between the title holder and the Crown, which conferred precedence over other Grandees). The territorial designation was chosen on account of him being a descendant, through the distaff line, of the ancient Counts of Abrantes, already extinct.

From 1727 to 1729, the Marquis of Fontes also served as Ambassador Extraordinary to the Spanish Court, where he was responsible for the negotiations for the "Exchange of the Princesses", the double marriage of Spanish Infanta Mariana Victoria of Spain to the heir of the Portuguese throne, Joseph, Prince of Brazil, and of her older half-brother Ferdinand, Prince of Asturias to Joseph's sister the Infanta Barbara of Portugal, in January 1729. After this, he was conferred the Order of the Golden Fleece by Philip V of Spain.

He died on 30 April 1733, and was succeeded in his titles by his only son, D. Joaquim Francisco de Sá Almeida e Meneses (1695–1756).
