= Duke of Abrantes (1753) =

Portuguese nobility

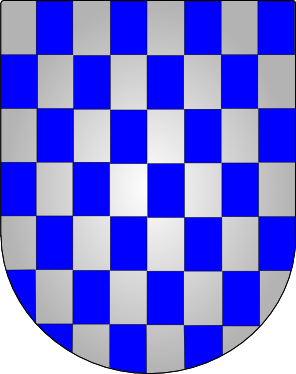
Arms of the 1st Duchess of Abrantes (Portuguese title)

Duke of Abrantes (unrelated to the Spanish and French titles) is a title of Portuguese nobility. It is the only one that was officially recognised by the Kingdom of Portugal. It was created by decree of King Joseph I of Portugal, on 9 December 1753, for Ana Maria Catarina Henriqueta de Lorena, 3rd Marchioness of Abrantes and 9th Countess of Penaguião.

The King advanced Dona Ana Maria de Lorena, 3rd Marchioness of Abrantes, to the rank of duchess (vitalício) upon her appointment as The Queen's Maid of Honour (Camareira-Môr), the highest court position for ladies. The title was subsequently revived for the same reason in favour of her daughter Maria Margarida, considered to be the "2nd Duchess".

== List of duchesses of Abrantes ==
1. Ana Maria Catarina Henriqueta de Lorena, Duchess of Abrantes vitalício (1691–1761), also 3rd Marchioness of Abrantes;
2. Maria Margarida de Lorena, Duchess of Abrantes vitalício (1713–1780), also 4th Marchioness of Abrantes (daughter of Duquesa Ana Maria).

== Subsidiary titles held by duchesses of Abrantes ==
- Countess of Penaguião, created in 1583 by King Philip I of Portugal;
- Marchioness of Abrantes, created in 1718 by King John V of Portugal.

== See also ==
- Duke of Abrantes
- Marquis of Abrantes
- Count of Abrantes
- Genealogical tree of the House of Abrantes
- House of Abrantes
- House of Lancaster
- Dukedoms in Portugal

== Bibliography ==
- Nobreza de Portugal e do Brasil, Vol. II, pp. 203–208, Lisbon, Zairol, 1989.
