= Francisco de Almeida =

Portuguese nobleman and soldier

His Lordship D. Francisco de Almeida
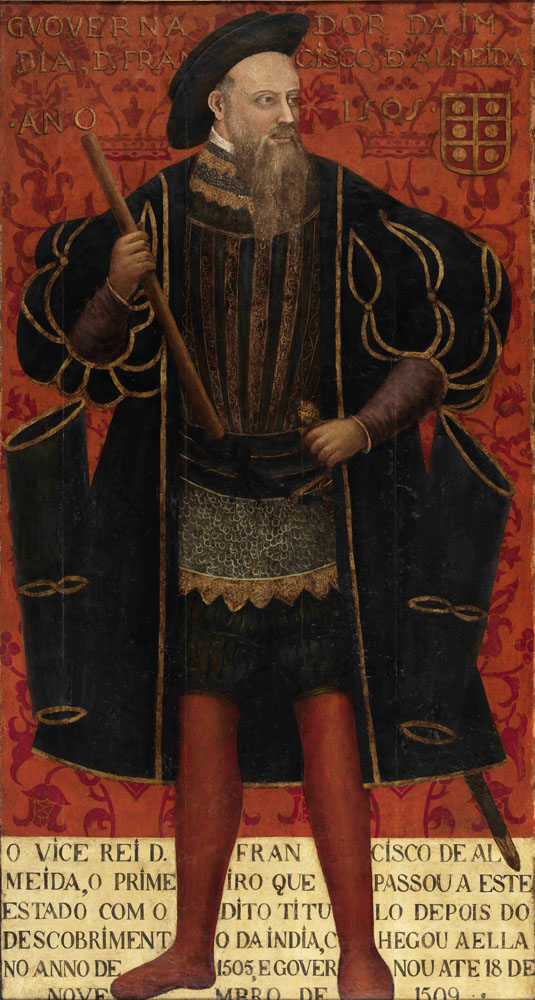

1st Viceroy of Portuguese India
- In office 12 September 1505 – 4 November 1509
- Monarch: Manuel I of Portugal
- Preceded by: Tristão da Cunha (designate; never took office)
- Succeeded by: Afonso de Albuquerque

Personal details
- Born: Francisco de Almeida ca. 1450 Lisbon, Kingdom of Portugal
- Died: 1 March 1510 (aged 59–60) Table Bay, Cape of Good Hope
- Children: Lourenço de Almeida
- Occupation: Soldier, explorer, viceroy of Portuguese India
- Known for: Establishment of Portuguese naval hegemony in the Indian Ocean.

Dom Francisco de Almeida (Portuguese pronunciation: [fɾɐ̃ˈsiʃku ðɨ alˈmɐjðɐ]; c. 1450 – 1 March 1510), was a Portuguese nobleman, soldier and explorer. He distinguished himself as a counsellor to King John II of Portugal and later in the wars against the Moors and in the conquest of Granada in 1492. In 1505 he was appointed as the first governor and viceroy of the Portuguese State of India (Estado da Índia). Almeida is credited with establishing Portuguese hegemony in the Indian Ocean with his victory at the naval Battle of Diu in 1509. Before Almeida returned to Portugal he lost his life in a conflict with indigenous people at the Cape of Good Hope in 1510. His only son Lourenço de Almeida had previously been killed in the Battle of Chaul.

== Exploits as soldier ==
Almeida was born at Lisbon as son of Lopo de Almeida, first Count of Abrantes and Brites da Silva. As was customary for men in his social circle, he joined the military at an early age. In 1476 he took part in the Battle of Toro. Then he fought in conflicts in different parts of Morocco and in 1492 participated in the Christian conquest of Granada on the side of the Castilians.

== Mission to the east ==
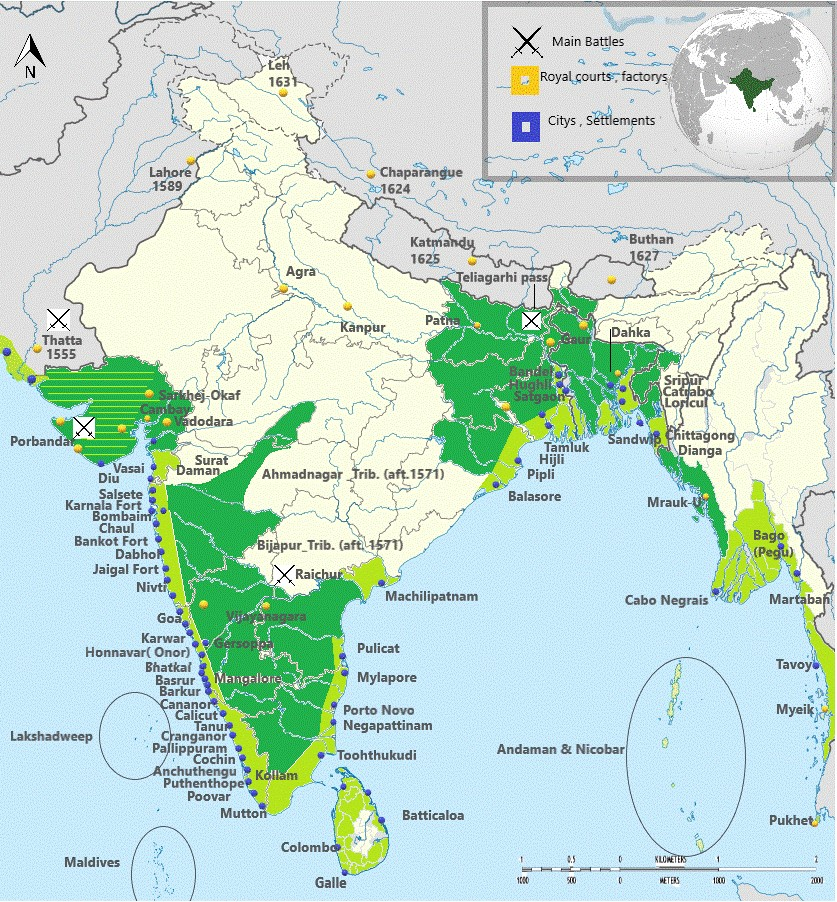
Portuguese presence in India, Gulf of Bengal and the Himalayas (maximum extent) between the 15th and 17th centuries

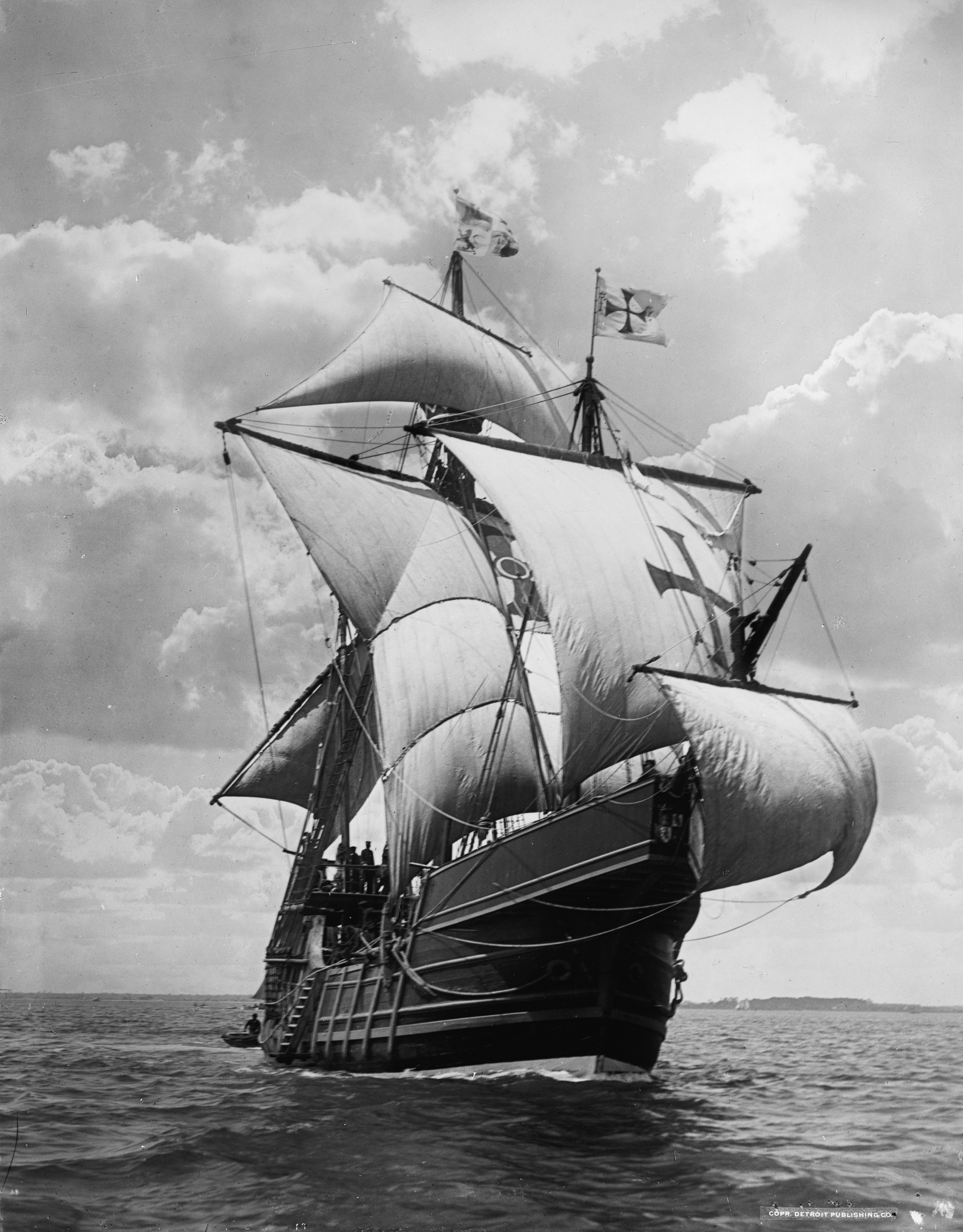
A carrack, 14 of which Almeida employed in his voyage to the east

In 1505, King Manuel I of Portugal made Almeida, then in his mid-fifties, the first viceroy of Portuguese India (Estado da Índia). With an armada of 22 ships, including 14 carracks and 6 caravels, Almeida departed from Lisbon on 25 March 1505. The armada carried a crew of 1,500 soldiers. The flagship was the carrack São Rafael captained by Fernão Soares. The mission's primary aims were to bring the spice trade under Portuguese control, build forts along the east African and Indian coasts, further Portuguese spice trade through alliances with local chieftains, and construct trading posts.

=== African conquest ===
Almeida rounded the Cape of Good Hope and entered African coastal waters again at Sofala and the Island of Mozambique, whence they proceeded northwards to the coastal settlement of Kilwa. In July 1505, they employed 8 ships to attack and conquer the roughly 4,000-strong population of this harbour town. Because of the good harbour that the town provided, sufficient for anchoring ships of up to 500 tons, the Portuguese decided to build a fort here. For this purpose, Pêro Ferreira and a crew of 80 soldiers remained in the town.

In 1505, Francisco d'Almeida arrived with eleven heavily armed ships that destroyed Kilwa, Barawa, and Mombasa, a coastal port further north. The city with a population of about 10,000 was conquered in heavy combat against the troops of the local Arab sheikh. The city was plundered and torched. The Portuguese were assisted in this attack by an enemy of Mombasa, the Sultan of Melinde. The same month, a caravel of Almeida's fleet captained by John (João) Homere captured Zanzibar island and claimed it for Portugal.

=== Viceroy in India ===
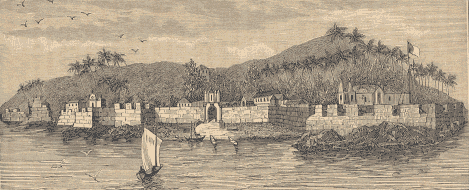
Fort Anjediva, Anjediva Island

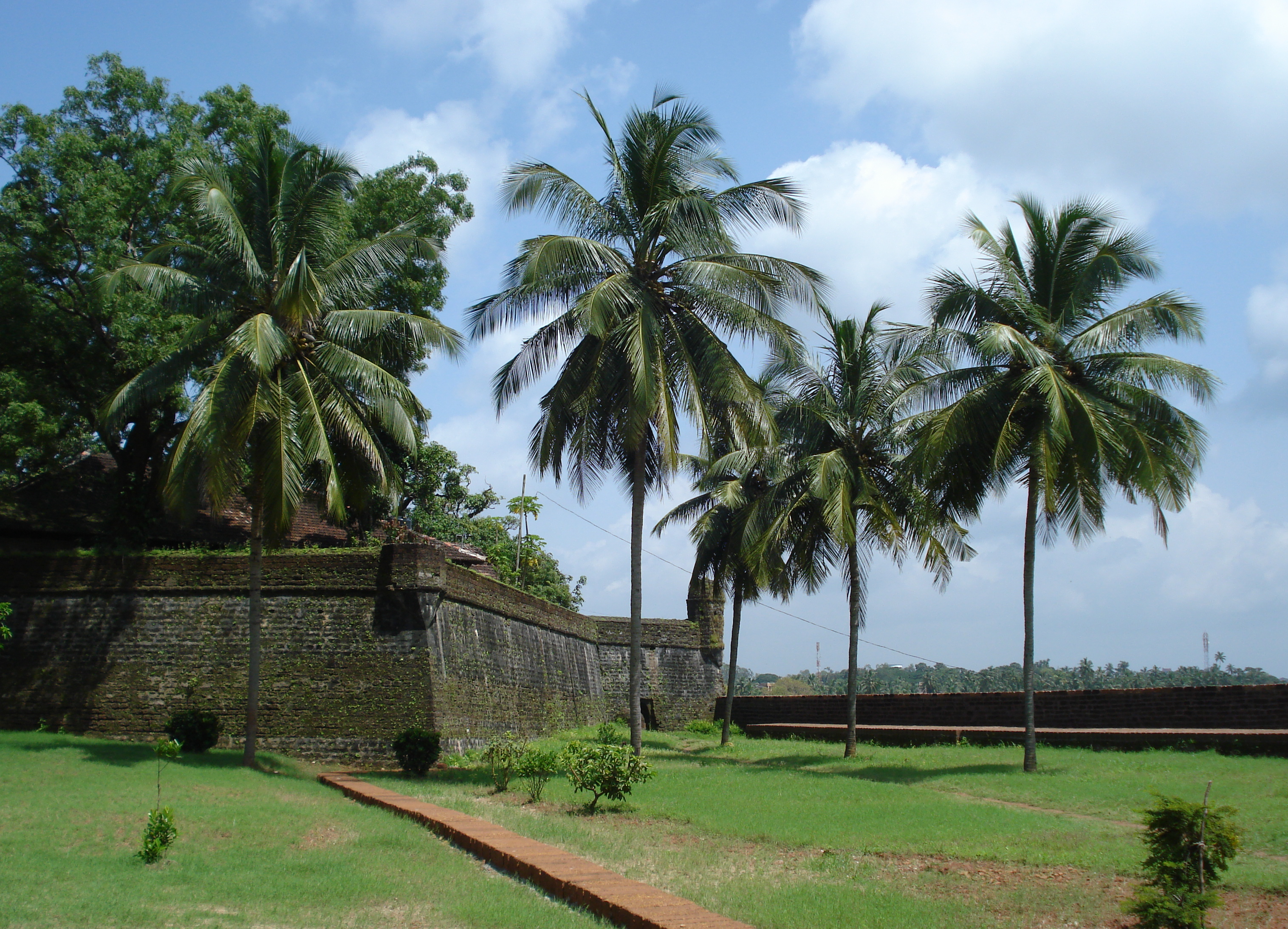
Fort St. Angelo, Cannanore

On 25 March 1505, Francisco de Almeida was appointed as Viceroy of India, on the condition that he would set up four forts on the southwestern Indian coast: at Anjediva Island, Cannanore, Cochin, and Quilon.

On 13 September, Francisco de Almeida reached Anjediva Island, where he immediately started the construction of Fort Anjediva. On 23 October, he started, with the permission of the friendly ruler Kōlattiri, the building of St. Angelo Fort in Cannanore, leaving Lourenço de Brito in charge with 150 men and two ships.

Francisco de Almeida then reached Cochin on 31 October 1505, with only eight vessels left. There he learnt that the Portuguese traders at Quilon had been killed. He decided to send his son Lourenço with 6 ships, who wantonly destroyed 27 Calicut vessels in the harbour of Quilon. Almeida took up residence in Cochin. He strengthened the Portuguese fortifications of Fort Manuel on Cochin.

The Zamorin of Calicut prepared a large fleet of 200 ships to oppose the Portuguese, but in March 1506 De Almeida's son Lourenço de Almeida intercepted Zamorin's fleet in a sea battle at the entrance to the harbour of Cannanore, the Battle of Cannanore, and inflicted heavy losses. Hereupon Lourenço de Almeida explored the coastal waters southwards to Colombo, in modern-day Sri Lanka. Meanwhile, the Zamorin succeeded in convincing the Kōlattiri of Cannanore of the true imperialistic motives of Portuguese in Kerala. The Kōlattiri was already annoyed and angered with the Portuguese for their violation of the safe conduct guaranteed to the ships of Muslim merchants of Cannanore. The Kōlattiri joined the fight against the Portuguese, besieging Fort St. Angelo at the Siege of Cannanore.

In 1507, Almeida's mission was strengthened by the arrival of Tristão da Cunha's squadron. Afonso de Albuquerque's squadron had, however, split from that of Cunha off east Africa and was independently conquering territories to the west.

In March 1508, at the request of the Arab merchants of Calicut, an Egyptian fleet under the command of Amir Husain Al-Kurdi (Mir Hussain) of the Egyptian Mamluk Sultanate attacked and defeated the Portuguese squadron under command of Lourenço de Almeida at Chaul in the Battle of Chaul. Lourenço de Almeida was killed in this battle and this led to a temporary retreat by the Portuguese from Indian waters.

Afonso de Albuquerque arrived at Cannanore at the close of 1508 and immediately made known a hitherto secret commission he had received from the King empowering him as governor to replace Almeida at the end of his term as viceroy. Almeida, determined to avenge the death of his son and free the Portuguese prisoners taken at Chaul, refused to recognize Albuquerque's credentials immediately, and later arrested him.

In 1509, Almeida became the first Portuguese to arrive by ship in Bombay. He sought Meliqueaz, to whom he had written a menacing letter, and the Egyptian Mamluk commander Amir Husain Al-Kurdi (Mir Hussain), fiercely engaging them at the naval Battle of Diu on 3 February 1509 commanding a fleet of 23 ships near the port of Diu. He inflicted a decisive defeat on a joint fleet from the Mamluk Sultanate of Egypt, the Ottoman Empire, the Zamorin of Calicut, and the Sultan of Gujarat, with technical naval support from the Republic of Venice and the Republic of Ragusa (Dubrovnik), which feared for their eastern trade links.

His victory was decisive: the Ottomans and Egyptians left the Indian Ocean, enabling a Portuguese trade monopoly over Indian waters for over 100 years, into the 17th century when it was ended by the Dutch and English. Albuquerque was released after three months' confinement, on the arrival of the grand-marshal of Portugal with a large fleet, in November 1509.

=== Return and death ===
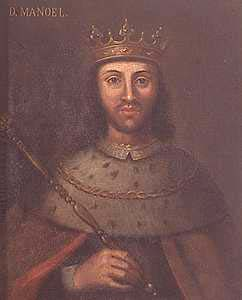
Almeida's patron, Manuel I of Portugal

Almeida sailed for Portugal in December 1509 and reached Table Bay near the Cape of Good Hope, where the Garcia, Belém, and Santa Cruz dropped anchor in late February 1510 to replenish water. There they encountered the local indigenous people, the ǃUriǁ'aikua (recorded as "Goringhaiqua", a Khoe-speaking clan). After friendly trade with the ǃUriǁ'aikua, some of the crew visited their nearby village, situated in modern-day Observatory where they tried to steal some of the locals' cattle. Almeida allowed his captains Pedro and Jorge Barreto to return to the village on the morning of 1 March 1510. The village's cattle herd was raided with the loss of one man, while Almeida awaited his men some distance from the beach. As the flagship's master Diogo d'Unhos had moved the landing boats to a watering point, the Portuguese were left without a means of retreat. The ǃUriǁ'aikua sensed the opportunity for an attack, during which Almeida and 64 of his men perished, including 11 of his captains. Almeida's body was recovered the same afternoon and buried on the shore front of the current Cape Town. An archivist, Nicolaas Vergunst, suggested in a 2011 book that De Almeida was the victim of a plot by his own men, who intentionally cut off his retreat after the planned provocation of the ǃUriǁ'aikua

== Relatives and subjects ==
Almeida was the son of the 1st Count of Abrantes and one of a number of highly distinguished siblings including two bishops, an ambassador to the Holy See and the Portuguese head of the Order of Malta. His son, Lourenço, was killed in the battle of Chaul, but he was survived by a daughter, Leonor, who was married twice: with Dom Rodrigo de Melo, Count of Tentúgal, precursor of the Dukes of Cadaval, and with Francisco de Mendonça, of the House of the Alcaides de Mourão. He also had a bastard daughter, Susana, who married Diogo de Barbuda, Alcaide of Seia. Ferdinand Magellan (Fernão de Magalhães) accompanied Almeida to the east, but was promoted to captain and only returned in 1512 after losing that commission.

== See also ==
- Lourenço de Almeida, his son
- 7th Portuguese India Armada (Almeida, 1505)
- Chronology of European exploration of Asia
- Gujarati-Portuguese conflicts
- First Luso-Malabarese War

Preceded by Post Established	Viceroy of Portuguese India; 1505–1509	Succeeded by Afonso de Albuquerque
