= Lopo de Almeida =

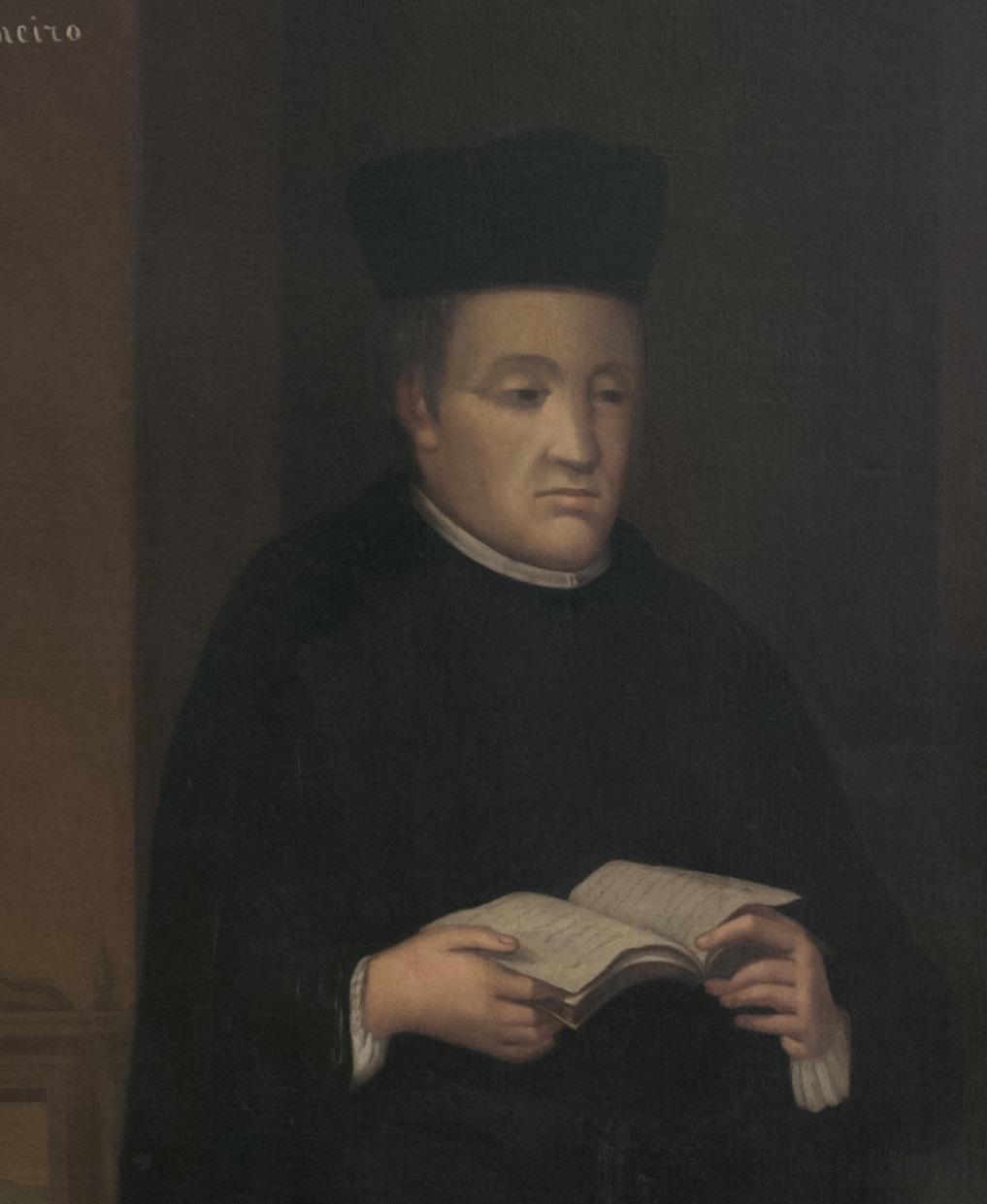
- Born: 1416
- Died: 1486
- Resting place: Abrantes, Portugal
- Occupation: Count of Abrantes
- Years active: 1476–1486
- Successor: D. João de Almeida
- Spouse: Brites da Silva
- Children: João de Almeida; Pedro de Almeida; Fernando de Almeida; Diogo Fernandes de Almeida; Jorge de Almeida; Francisco de Almeida; Afonso de Almeida; Duarte de Almeida; Isabel da Silva; Catarina da Silva; Branca Gil de Almeida; Briolanja de Almeida

Lopo de Almeida (1416–1486) was the first Count of Abrantes bestowed with the title on June 13, 1476 by King D. Afonso V of Portugal.

== Biography ==
Fidalgo of the Portuguese court during the reigns of kings D. Afonso V and D. João II, he was a knight, diplomat, Finance Minister, businessman and benefactor, beyond Mayor of Abrantes, Punhete, Amêndoa, the castle of Torres Novas, lord of Sardoal and Mação and member of the Royal Counsil, governor of the lands of the Queen and other high roles on the Portuguese Court.

Lopo de Almeida was a grandson of Fernão Álvares de Almeida, knight of Avis and a son of Diogo Fernandes de Almeida, both very important fidalgos of the Portuguese Court.

During his lifetime, D. Lopo provided several services to Country and Crown. In 1451 he accompanied infanta D. Leonor, older sister of king D. Afonso V, to Rome, where she married Frederick III, Holy Roman Emperor. In this trip he wrote a series of letters to the king, which he sent one every month, describing the journey, the people and the landscape, which were edited for the first time in 1739.

== Wedding and posterity ==
D. Lopo married Brites da Silva in 1442, lady of queen D. Leonor of Aragon's court. She was daughter of Pedro Gonçalves Malafaia, finance minister of king D. João I and his ambassador to Castile. They had twelve children:

1. D. João de Almeida (1443-1512), second Count of Abrantes.
2. D. Pedro de Almeida (d.1512), commander of the Order of Avis.
3. D. Fernando de Almeida (Lisbon 1467?- 1500), bishop of Ceuta, apostolic nuncio to Alexander VI, he was one of the three deputies that in Valois cancelled the marriage of Louis XII of France and Joanne of Valois so the king could marry Anne duchess of Brittany. He might have been poisoned by Cesare Borgia.
4. D. Diogo Fernandes de Almeida (died 1508), was the sixth prior of Crato, Grand Huntsman of King D. João II and mayor of Torres Novas.
5. D. Jorge de Almeida (1458–1543), Bishop of Coimbra, second Count of Arganil. He baptized infante D. Henrique, future king of Portugal, and had many votes to be Pope. First Grand Inquisitor of the Portuguese Inquisition.
6. D. Francisco de Almeida, first viceroy of India.
7. D. Afonso de Almeida.
8. D. Duarte de Almeida.
9. D. Isabel da Silva, first countess of Penela.
10. D. Catarina da Silva, subprioress at the Jesus Monastery of Aveiro.
11. D. Branca Gil de Almeida
12. D. Briolanja de Almeida (1430–1480).
