= Exchange of the Princesses (1729) =

Portuguese-Spanish double marriage

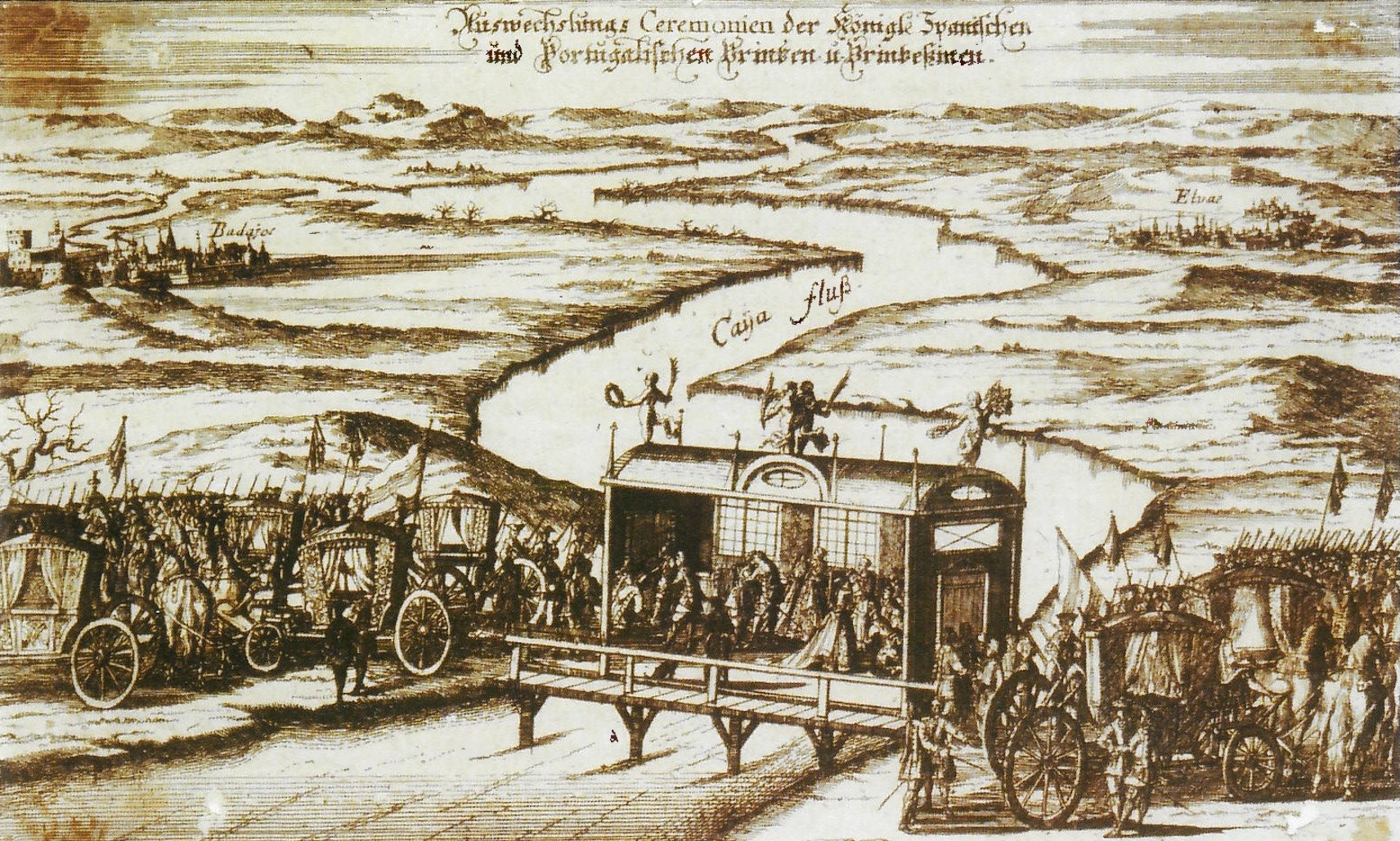
Contemporary engraving depicting the Exchange of the Princesses over the Caia River on the Portugal–Spain border

The Exchange of the Princesses (Portuguese: Troca das Princesas; Spanish: Intercambio de las Princesas) refers to the ceremonies of the double marriage of Spanish Infanta Mariana Victoria of Spain to the heir of the Portuguese throne, Joseph, Prince of Brazil, and of her older half-brother Ferdinand, Prince of Asturias to Joseph's sister the Infanta Barbara of Portugal, in January 1729.

In what was a complex diplomatic and protocolary arrangement, the two sets of princes and princesses were escorted to the Portugal–Spain border by the two Iberian royal courts and were exchanged on a purpose-built ephemeral pavilion built on a bridge over the Caia River, by the towns of Elvas (on the Portuguese side) and Badajoz (on the Spanish side). There was a great preoccupation with ensuring the ceremonial was perfectly symmetrical so that both kings, John V of Portugal and Philip V of Spain, were given equal precedence. There was also a concern with evoking — and outdoing — the episode on the Isle of Pheasants in which Infanta Mariana Victoria of Spain had originally been betrothed to Louis XV of France (the young Spanish Infanta had been rejected four years later, causing a diplomatic rift between Spain and France).

The marriage negotiations were conducted by the Marquis of Los Balbases and the Marquis of Abrantes.

Some of the carriages used for the ceremony subsist in the collections of the National Coach Museum in Lisbon: three French berlines, the Dom José Coach, and the Coach of the Table. A gala berline is at the Luray Caverns Car and Carriage Caravan Museum in Luray, Virginia.

== Gallery ==
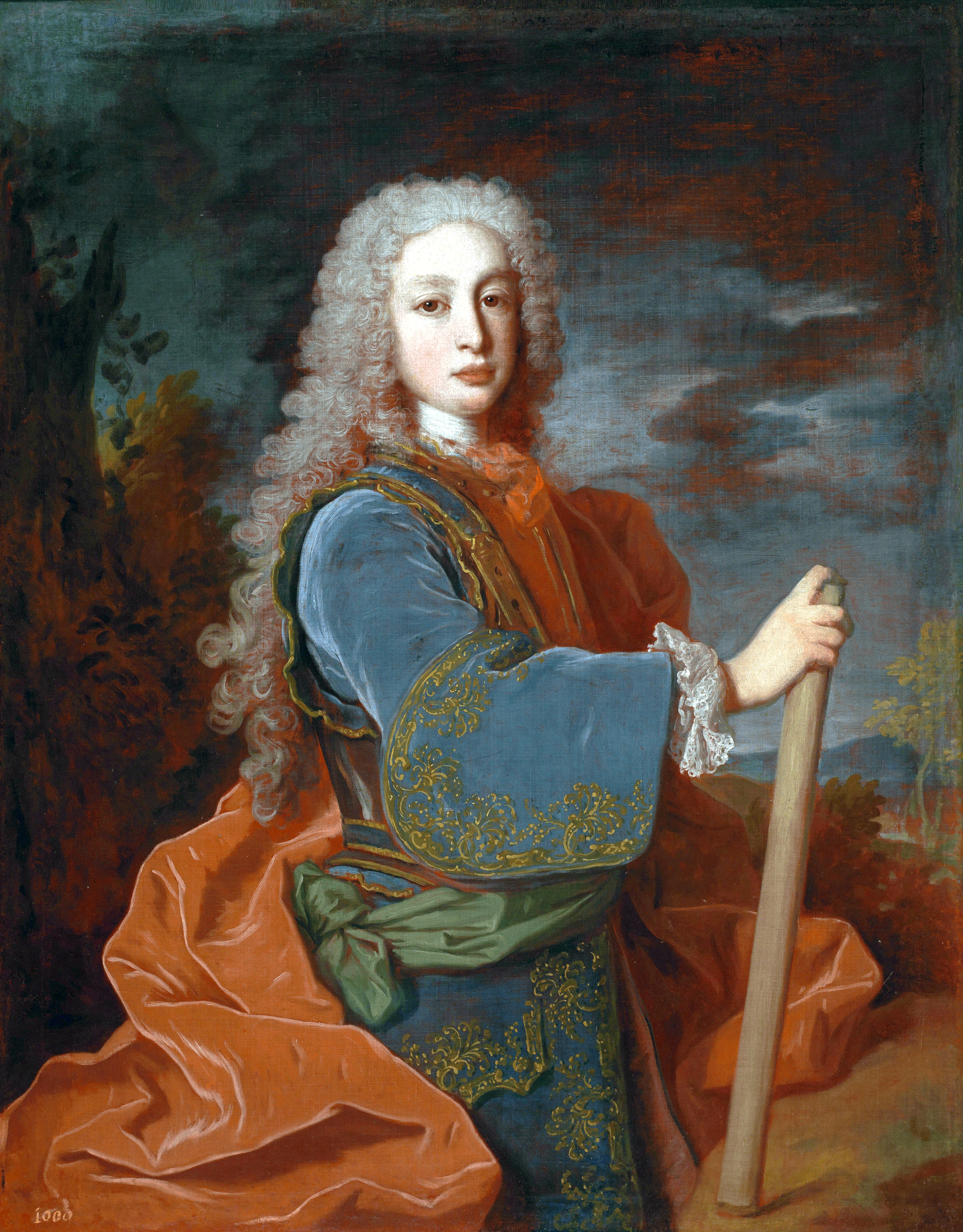
Joseph, Prince of Brazil, by Jean Ranc, 1729

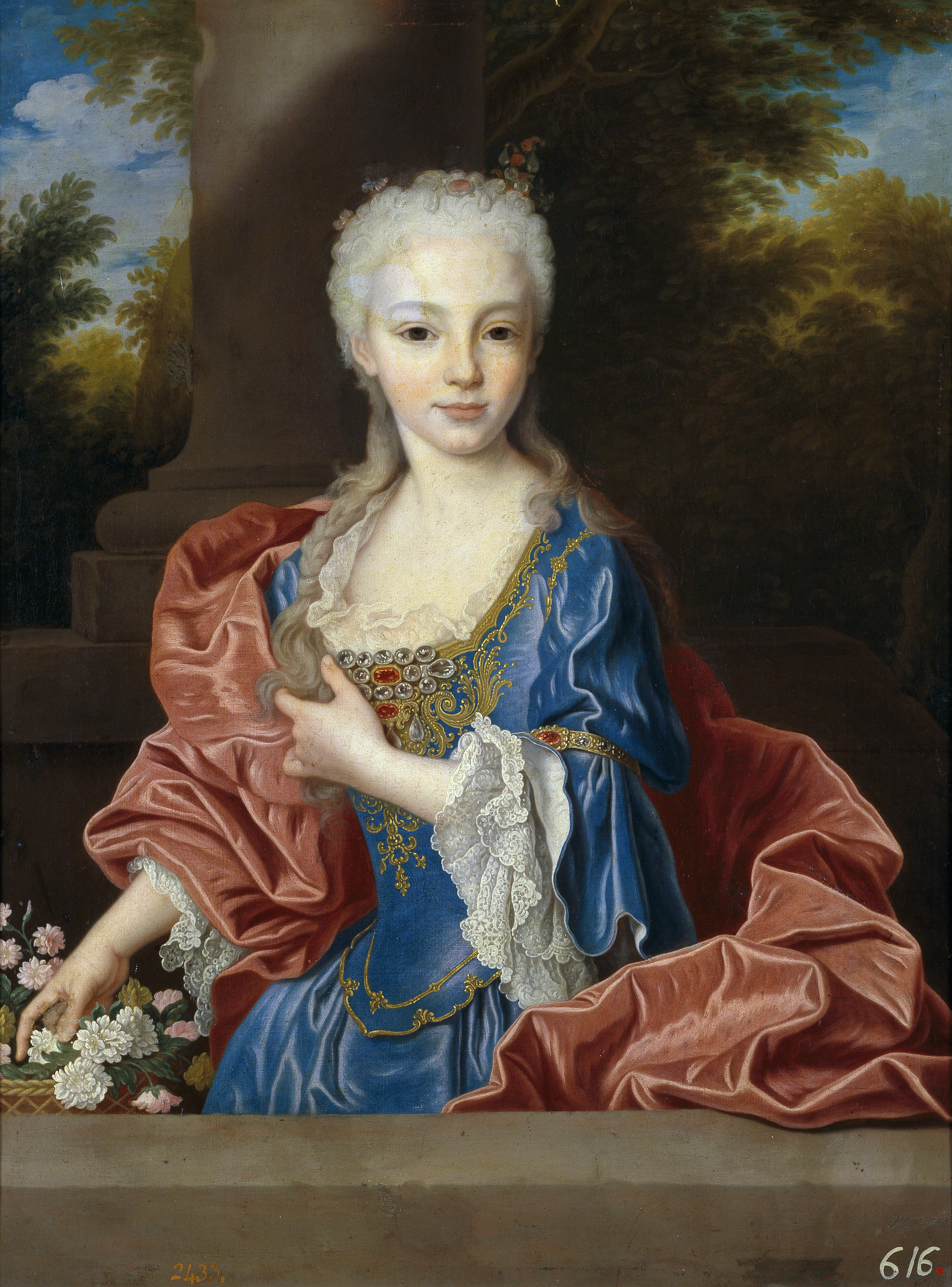
Mariana Victoria of Bourbon, Infanta of Spain, by Jean Ranc, c. 1725-8

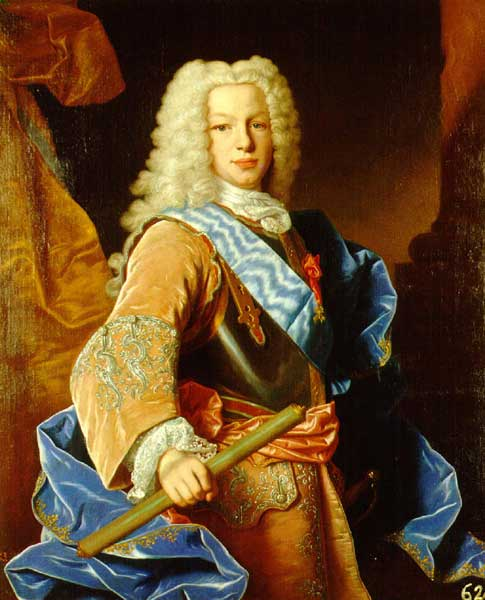
Ferdinand, Prince of Asturias, by Jean Ranc, 1731

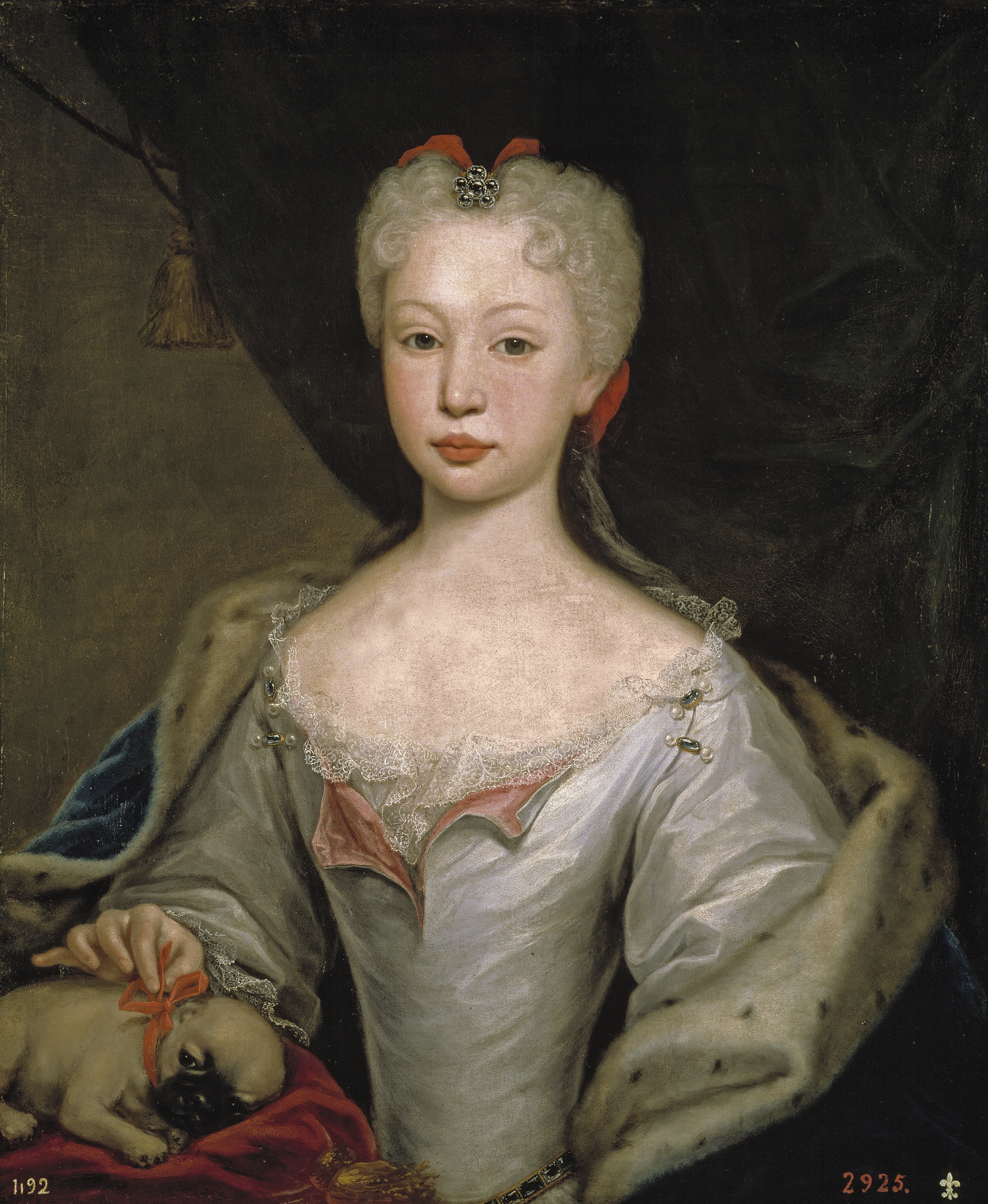
Maria Barbara of Braganza, Infanta of Portugal, by Domenico Duprà, 1725
