= Rui de Sá =

Angolan diplomat

Chairperson of the Angolan Volleyball Federation
- In office 1978–2002

MPLA Representative to Egypt
- In office 1970s–?

Personal details
- Born: Rui Alberto Filomeno de Sá; 20 April 1939; Lunda Sul, Angola
- Died: 12 August 2017 (aged 78); Luanda, Angola
- Spouse: Cristina Odete de Sá

General Rui de Sá, also known as General Dibala, was an Angolan liberation rebel who served as the representative of the Popular Movement for the Liberation of Angola (MPLA) to Egypt in the 1970s.
