= Maria Margarida de Lorena, 2nd Duchess of Abrantes =

Portuguese noble, court lady

Maria Margarida de Lorena, Duchess of Abrantes (2 February 1713 – 1780) was the daughter of Dom Rodrigo de Mello (1688–1713), second child of Nuno Álvares Pereira de Melo, 1st Duke of Cadaval and of Ana Maria Catarina Henriqueta de Lorena, 1st Duchess of Abrantes.

== Biography ==
On 22 December 1726, Maria Margarida married her uncle, Joaquim Francisco de Sá Almeida e Menezes, 2nd Marquis of Abrantes (her mother's younger brother), who died in 1756.

King Joseph I of Portugal elevated the dowager marchioness to the title and degree of Duchess of Abrantes vitalício (by Royal Decree of 1757) upon her appointment as the Queen's Mistress of the Robes (Camareira-Môr (in Portuguese)). This was the highest position in the Portuguese court for a lady, and one which her mother previously held.

On 20 February 1757, she married secondly João da Bemposta, natural son of the Infante Francisco, and her husband was raised to the style and degree of duke on 18 May 1757.

When her mother, the Duchess Ana Maria, died in 1765, Maria Margarida succeeded to her hereditary titles as 4th Marchioness of Abrantes and 10th Countess of Penaguião.

Maria Margarida had no issue from either marriage, and her hereditary titles devolved upon her 2nd cousin Pedro de Lancastre da Silveira de Castelo-Branco Sá e Menezes (1762–1828), 7th Count of Vila Nova de Portimão.

== See also ==
- Dukedoms in Portugal
- Marquis of Abrantes
- Count of Penaguião

== Bibliography ==
"Nobreza de Portugal e do Brasil" – Vol. II, page 206. Published by Zairol Lda., Lisbon 1989.

== Notes ==
Portuguese nobility
Preceded by New title	Duchess of Abrantes; 1757–1780	Succeeded by For life
Preceded by Ana Maria Catarina Henriqueta de Lorena, 3rd Marchioness	Marquis of Abrantes; 1761–1780	Succeeded by Pedro de Lancastre da Silveira de Castelo-Branco Sá e Menezes, 5th Marquis
Preceded by Ana Maria Catarina Henriqueta de Lorena, 9th Countess	Count of Penaguião; 1761–1780	Succeeded by Pedro de Lancastre da Silveira de Castelo-Branco Sá e Menezes, 11th Count
