= Count of Penaguião =

Portuguese nobility

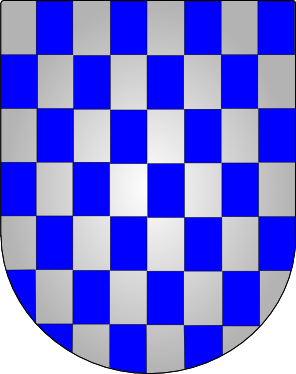
- Creation date: 10 February 1583
- Created by: Philip I of Portugal
- Peerage: Peerage of Portugal
- First holder: Dom João Rodrigues de Sá
- Present holder: Dom José Maria da Piedade de Lancastre e Távora

Count of Penaguião (in Portuguese Conde de Penaguião) is a Portuguese title of nobility, created by King Philip I of Portugal, on 10 February 1583, for Dom João Rodrigues de Sá.

The noble family of Sá were elevated as Marquises of Fontes in 1659.

By Royal Decree of King John V of Portugal on 24 June 1718, the 3rd Marquis of Fontes, a celebrated military commander and ambassador, received a grant of land from the Crown and was conferred the additional distinguished marquisate of Abrantes; the Letters Patent also granted him the additional ancient arms and name of Almeida and stipulated the countship of Penaguião devolve upon the Marquis' heir apparent de jure.

== List of counts of Penaguião (1583) ==
1. João Rodrigues de Sá (c.1555- ? );
2. Francisco de Sá de Menezes (1598-1647), his son;
3. João Rodrigues de Sá e Menezes (1619-1658), his son;
4. Francisco de Sá e Menezes (c.1640-1677), his son, also 1st Marquis of Fontes;
5. João Rodrigo de Sá e Menezes, his son;
6. João Rodrigues de Sá Menezes (1674-1688), his brother, also 2nd Marquis of Fontes;
7. Rodrigo Anes de Sá Almeida e Menezes (1676-1733), his younger brother, also 3rd Marquis of Fontes, later 1st Marquis of Abrantes;
8. Joaquim Francisco de Sá Almeida e Menezes (1695-1756), his son, also 2nd Marquis of Abrantes;
9. Ana Maria Catarina Henriqueta de Lorena (1691-1761), his sister, also 3rd Marchioness and Duchess of Abrantes for life;
10. Maria Margarida de Lorena (1713-1780), her daughter, also 4th Marchioness and Duchess of Abrantes for life;
11. José Maria de Lancastre e Távora de Almeida Sá e Menezes (1742-1771), his 2nd cousin, also 6th Count of Vila Nova de Portimão;
12. Pedro de Lancastre da Silveira de Castelo-Branco Sá e Menezes (1762-1828), his son, also 5th Marquis of Abrantes and 7th Count of Vila Nova de Portimão;
13. José Maria da Piedade de Lancastre (1784-1827), his son, also 6th Marquis of Abrantes and 8th Count of Vila Nova de Portimão;
14. Pedro Maria da Piedade de Lancastre Almeida Sá Menezes (1816-1847), his son, also 7th Marquis of Abrantes and 9th Count of Vila Nova de Portimão;
15. João Maria da Piedade de Lancastre e Távora (1864-1917), his nephew, also 8th Marquis of Abrantes and 11th Count of Vila Nova de Portimão;
16. José Maria da Piedade de Lancastre e Távora (1887-1961), his son, also 9th Marquis of Abrantes and 12th Count of Vila Nova de Portimão;
17. Luis Gonzaga de Lancastre e Távora (1937-1993), his son, also 10th Marquis of Abrantes and 13th Count of Vila Nova de Portimão;
18. José Maria da Piedade de Lancastre e Távora (born 1960), his son, the 11th and present Marquis of Abrantes, also 14th Count of Vila Nova de Portimão.

== See also ==
- House of Abrantes
- Marquis of Abrantes
- Count of Vila Nova de Portimão
- List of countships in Portugal

== Bibliography ==
- ”Nobreza de Portugal e do Brasil" – Vol. III, pages 112/113. Published by Zairol Lda., Lisbon 1989.
