= Barbara of Portugal =

Queen of Spain from 1746 to 1758

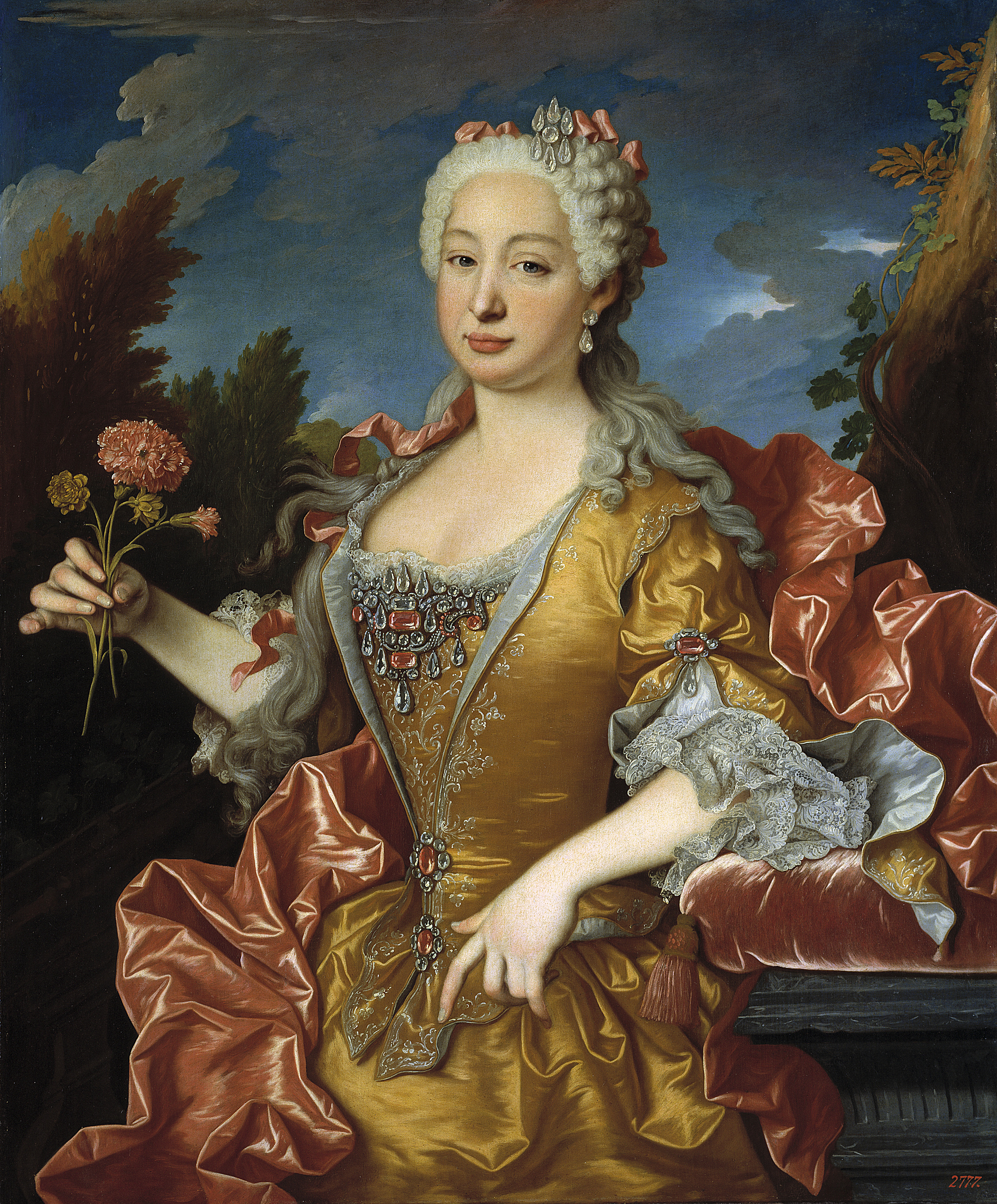
- Portrait by Jean Ranc, 1729

Queen consort of Spain
- Tenure: 9 July 1746 – 27 August 1758
- Born: 4 December 1711; Ribeira Palace, Lisbon, Portugal
- Died: 27 August 1758 (aged 46); Royal Palace, Aranjuez, Spain
- Burial: Convent of the Salesas Reales
- Spouse: Ferdinand VI of Spain (m. 1729)
Names
- Portuguese: Maria Madalena Bárbara Xavier Leonor Teresa Antónia Josefa; Spanish: María Magdalena Bárbara Javiera Leonor Teresa Antonia Josefa
- House: Braganza
- Father: John V of Portugal
- Mother: Maria Anna of Austria

Barbara of Portugal (Maria Madalena Bárbara Xavier Leonor Teresa Antónia Josefa; 4 December 1711 – 27 August 1758) was an Infanta of Portugal, and Queen consort of Spain by marriage to Ferdinand VI. She had a good relationship with Ferdinand and is known for her influence over the affairs of state.

== Life ==
=== Infanta of Portugal ===
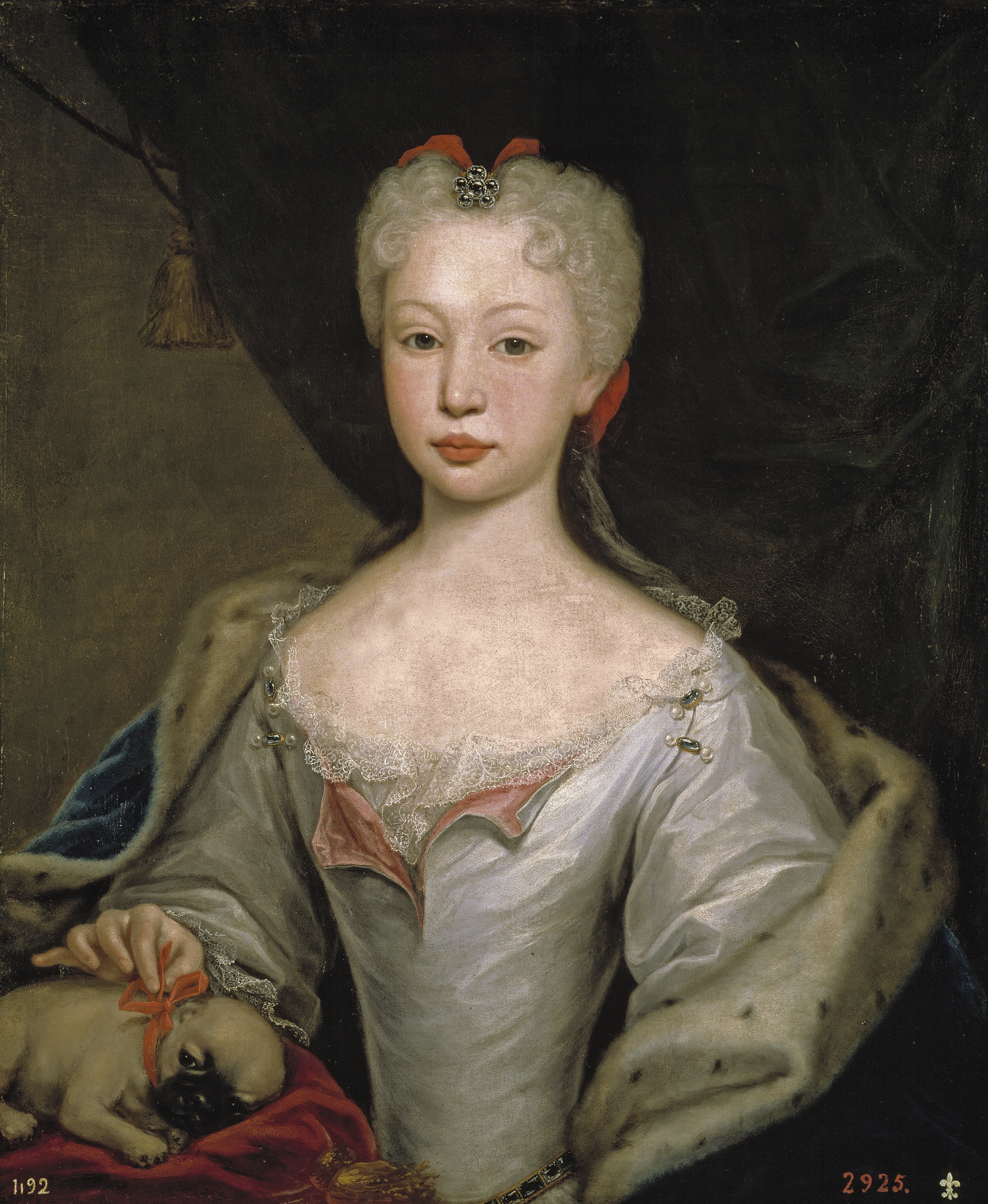
A young Barbara painted by Domenico Duprà

Barbara was the daughter of King John V of Portugal and his wife Maria Anna of Austria. Their marriage remained childless for nearly three years, and thus the king made a promise to God that if an heir to the throne was born, a great convent would be built as a sign of gratitude. Upon the birth of a daughter in late 1711 began the building of the Convent of Mafra. The child was baptised Maria Madalena Bárbara Xavier Leonor Teresa Antónia Josefa, honouring a number of saints and relatives, and styled Princess of Brazil as the heiress presumptive to the Portuguese throne. She was usually referred to as Bárbara or Maria Bárbara after Saint Barbara, the saint of her birthday, a name never used before among Portuguese royalty.

Two years later, Barbara's mother gave birth to a son, Pedro, and she ceased to be heir presumptive. Pedro died at the age of two, but by that time, the queen had already had another son, Joseph, and hence Barbara never became heiress presumptive again.

Barbara had a fine education and loved music. A talented keyboard player, she was the sole pupil of Domenico Scarlatti, the great harpsichordist and composer, from age 9 or 10 until 1757, when Scarlatti died, a year before her own death.

In 1725, Barbara was among the seventeen princesses seriously considered for marriage to king Louis XV of France, when the list of the original 99 had been reduced. However, there were concerns about the perceived weak physical and mental health of her family as well as her young age, and in the end she was removed from the list.

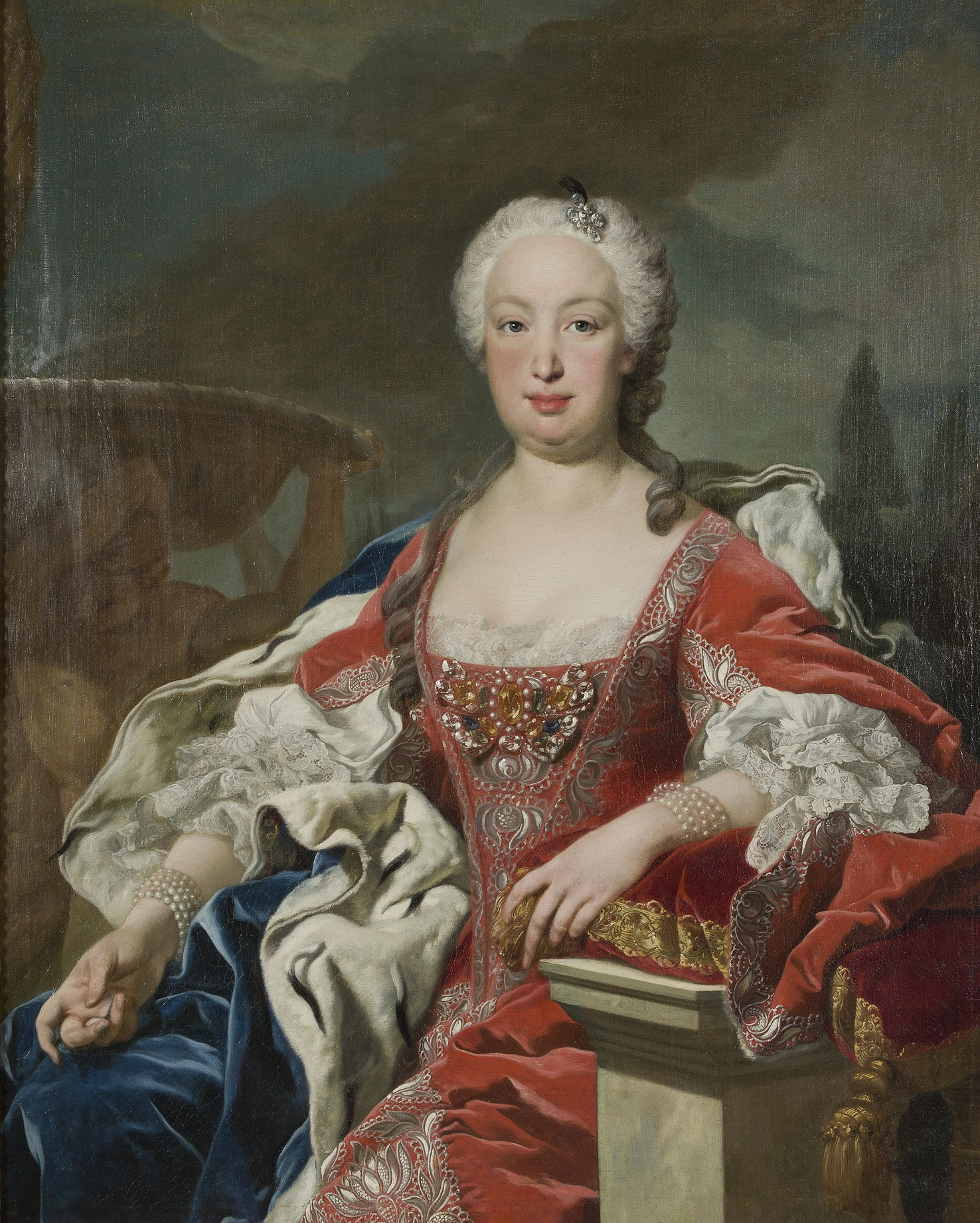
Portrait by Louis-Michel van Loo, c. 1740

=== Princess of Asturias ===
In 1729, at the age 18, Barbara married the future Ferdinand VI of Spain, two years her junior, the marriage contract having been signed the previous year. Her brother Joseph married Ferdinand's half-sister, the Spanish Infanta Mariana Victoria, who had also been rejected as a bride for Louis XV. The double marriage, known as the Exchange of the Princesses, was meant to repair the Portuguese-Spanish alliance. Scarlatti followed Barbara to Madrid after her marriage and remained with her, composing hundreds of harpsichord sonatas for her.

During their time as Prince and Princess of the Asturias, Ferdinand and Barbara became the target of the opposition known as the Spanish party, in parallel with Spain's deteriorating relations with Portugal. From 1733 until 1737 they were kept more or less under house arrest in their apartments, prevented from appearing in public and watched by the spies of Queen Elisabeth. This gave Barbara the time to deepen her relationship with Ferdinand, a timid person who suffered also from ill health.

Barbara was not considered beautiful by her contemporaries, and her homely looks were thought by observers to have caused her future husband a visible shock when he was first presented to her. However, Ferdinand became deeply attached to her, sharing her passion for music and soon becoming dependent on her for advice and support. When he ascended the Spanish throne as Ferdinand VI, the French ambassador noted "it is rather Barbara who succeeds Elisabeth [Ferdinand's step-mother] than Ferdinand succeeding Philippe." Barbara was well-educated, and in addition to her musical talents was adept at languages and was an avid reader on many varied subjects.

=== Queen of Spain ===
Upon their succession, Barbara was exposed to attempts to drive a political wedge between her and Ferdinand, engineered by, among others, supporters of the Queen Dowager, and she formed an alliance with three members of the Spanish party, who had been in opposition during the previous regime, Ensenada, Huescar and Carvajal. She thus secured the Spanish party as her supporters and obtained the dismissal of all power holders of the previous regime who threatened her influence over Ferdinand. Encouraged by Barbara, Ferdinand fired the minister Villarias, who was replaced by Carvajal, and in July 1747 the Queen Dowager was banished from court.

Coat of arms of Queen Barbara

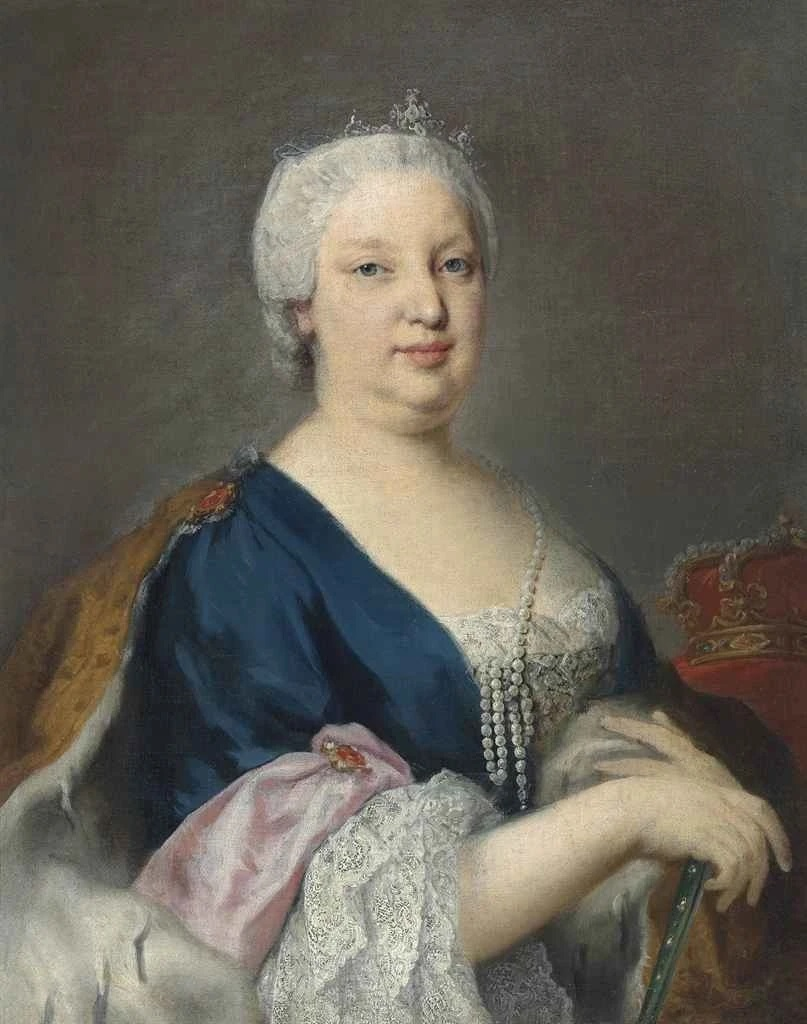
Portrait of Queen Barbara by Jacopo Amigoni

During her husband's reign, Barbara was to preside over magnificent parties and concerts at her favorite retreat, the Royal Palace of Aranjuez. However, in contrast to her predecessor as queen, Barbara did not like to flaunt her influence over her spouse and the government policy, and she made a moderately positive impression upon the public. She was not as self-assured, nor did she have as much political ambition as Elisabeth Farnese, and her policy focused mainly upon a friendly relationship between Spain and Portugal in cooperation with her father and the Portuguese ambassador Belmonte. Queen Barbara participated regularly in the affairs of state: the ministers, who respected her, presented to her all documents of state before they were given to the king, because: "only she knows what ought either be said or hidden from the king": she was the channel through which the ministers worked with the king, as it was she who advised them how to achieve the desired result from the king, and the ministers relied upon her for their work as, the British ambassador Benjamin Keene reported: "She can sway him as she pleases, with as much power, but much less difficulty, than ever the Dowager did with the late King, his father." In 1754, she was behind the fall of her previous ally Ensenada. Keene and Huascar presented the Queen with a paper implying that minister Ensenada was making puppets of the royal couple. They succeeded in convincing her to act against Ensenada, and in cooperation with Richard Wall and Huascar, Barbara convinced Ferdinand to exile Ensenada.

The couple produced no children who survived, with Barbara having delivered a stillborn son in 1733. Barbara suffered from severe asthma for most of her life and in later years became overweight. She died at the Royal Palace of Aranjuez, on the outskirts of Madrid on 27 August 1758. Her death was said to have broken her husband's heart.

=== As composer? ===
The harpsichordist/scholar Ralph Kirkpatrick published an article suggesting, quite diffidently, that the celebrated series of keyboard sonatas standardly attributed to Domenico Scarlatti were in fact the work of his pupil Barbara—who, under this view, would qualify as one of the outstanding musicians of her century. Kirkpatrick notes that concealment of Barbara's authorship would have been sensible in light of the contemporary taboo against aristocrats (especially female ones) doing the work of a tradesman. He does not attempt to establish his hypothesis as true, but only suggests that it is plausible and not easy to prove false.

== Ancestors ==
Ancestors of Barbara of Portugal

8. John IV of Portugal
4. Peter II of Portugal
9. Luisa de Guzmán
2. John V of Portugal
10. Philip William, Elector Palatine
5. Maria Sophia of Neuburg
11. Elisabeth Amalie of Hesse-Darmstadt
1. Barbara of Braganza
12. Ferdinand III, Holy Roman Emperor
6. Leopold I, Holy Roman Emperor
13. Maria Anna of Austria
3. Maria Anna of Austria
14. Philip William, Elector Palatine (= 10)
7. Eleonore Magdalene of Neuburg
15. Elisabeth Amalie of Hesse-Darmstadt (= 11)

== Bibliography ==
- Noel, Charles C. (2004). "'Barbara Succeeds Elizabeth...': The Feminisation and Domestication of Politics in the Spanish Monarchy, 1701–1759". In Campbell Orr, Clarissa (ed.). Queenship in Europe 1660–1815: The Role of the Consort. Cambridge University Press. pp. 155–185. ISBN 0-521-81422-7.

Barbara of Portugal House of Braganza Cadet branch of the House of Aviz Born: 4 December 1711 Died: 27 August 1758
Spanish royalty
Preceded by Elisabeth Farnese	Queen consort of Spain; 1746–1758	Vacant Title next held by Maria Amalia of Saxony
Portuguese royalty
Vacant Title last held by John who became John V	Princess of Brazil; Duchess of Braganza; 1711–1712	Succeeded by Peter
