= Count of Vila Nova de Portimão =

Portuguese nobility

Coat of Arms of the Castelo Branco family, Counts of Vila Nova de Portimão.

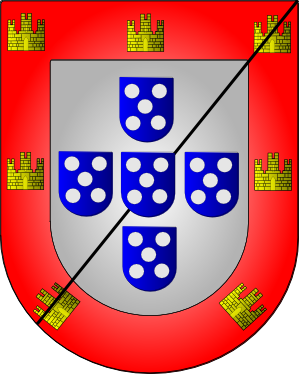
Coat of Arms of the Lencastre family, Counts of Vila Nova de Portimão.

Count of Vila Nova de Portimão (Portuguese: Conde de Vila Nova de Portimão) was a Portuguese title of nobility granted on 28 May 1504, by King Manuel I of Portugal to D. Martinho de Castelo Branco, 2nd Lord of Vila Nova de Portimão.

In 1662, the third count died without issue and this title was inherited by his sister's grandson, Luís de Lencastre (who descended from Infante George of Lencastre, Duke of Coimbra).

Later, in the 18th century, due to the 5th count's marriage to Maria Sofia de Lencastre (heiress of the House of Abrantes), the family reunited all the estates and honours within the same House, which became a reference among the Portuguese aristocracy.

== List of counts of Vila Nova de Portimão ==
1. Martinho Castelo Branco (c.1460- ? );
2. Manuel de Castelo Branco (1550- ?), his grandson;
3. Gregório Taumaturgo de Castelo-Branco (c.1600-1662), his son;
4. Luis de Lancastre (1644-1704), his grand-nephew;
5. Pedro de Lancastre (1697-1752), his son;
6. José Maria de Lancastre e Tavora (1742-1771), his grandson;
7. Pedro de Lancastre da Silveira de Castelo-Branco Sá e Menezes (1762-1862), his son, also 5th Marquis of Abrantes and 12th Count of Penaguião;
8. José Maria da Piedade de Lancastre (1784-1827), his son, 6th Marquis of Abrantes and 13th Count of Penaguião;
9. Pedro Maria da Piedade de Lancastre Almeida Sá Menezes (1816-1847), 7th Marquis of Abrantes and 14th Count of Penaguião, died without issue;
10. José Maria da Piedade de Lancastre e Tavora (1819-1870), his younger brother;
11. João Maria da Piedade de Lancastre e Tavora (1864-1917), his son, also 8th Marquis of Abrantes and 15th Count of Penaguião;
12. José Maria da Piedade de Lancastre e Tavora (1887-1961), his son, also 9th Marquis of Abrantes and 16th Count of Penaguião;
13. Luis Gonzaga de Lancastre e Tavora (1937-1993), his son, also 10th Marquis of Abrantes and 18th Count of Penaguião;
14. José Maria da Piedade de Lancastre e Tavora (born 1960), also 11th Marquis of Abrantes and 19th Count of Penaguião.

== See also ==
- Marquis of Abrantes
- Count of Penaguião
- List of countships in Portugal

== Bibliography ==
"Nobreza de Portugal e Brasil" Vol. III, pages 514/516. Published by Zairol, Lda., Lisbon, 1989.
