= João Rodrigues de Sá =

Count of Penaguião

João Rodrigues de Sá (c.1555 – ? ) was the first Count of Penaguião, a Portuguese title. He was succeeded by his son Francisco de Sá de Menezes (1598–1647) and then his son João Rodrigues de Sá e Menezes (1619–1658). His son Francisco de Sá e Menezes (c.1640–1677) was also 1st Marquis of Fontes and his son João Rodrigo de Sá e Menezes succeeded him. His brother João Rodrigues de Sá Menezes (1674–1688) came next and was also 2nd Marquis of Fontes.

Under the administration of John IV of Portugal, João Rodrigues de Sá visited the island of Berlengas accompanied by a military engineer to determine the construction of Fort of São João Baptista (Berlengas).
