= Ana Maria de Lorena, 1st Duchess of Abrantes =

Portuguese noblewoman and courtier

Coronet of a Duchess

Ana Maria de Lorena, Duchess of Abrantes (Ana Maria Catarina Henriqueta de Lorena; 3 September 1691 – 1761) was a Portuguese noblewoman and courtier.

== Life ==
The eldest daughter of Rodrigo Anes de Sá Almeida e Menezes, 1st Marquis of Abrantes and 7th Count of Penaguião, she adopted the surname "de Lorena" after a maternal great-grandfather, François-Louis de Lorraine.

By Royal Decree of King Joseph I of Portugal of 9 December 1753, she was created Duchess of Abrantes vitalício upon her appointment as The Queen's Mistress of the Robes (in Portuguese Camareira-Môr), the highest court position for a lady. She inherited her family estates and honours three years later, upon her brother's death. Her younger brother, Joaquim Francisco de Sá Almeida e Menezes, had succeeded their father as 2nd Marquis of Abrantes and married Dona Ana Maria's only daughter, but died without issue; thus, in 1756, she became 3rd Marchioness of Abrantes and 9th Countess of Penaguião.

Her surname of Lorena (the Portuguese translation for Lorraine) was inherited from her maternal grandmother, Marie-Angelique-Henriette de Lorraine, daughter of François-Louis, comte d'Harcourt.

Duquesa Ana Maria married Dom Rodrigo de Mello (1688–1713), second child of Nuno Álvares Pereira de Mello, 1st Duke of Cadaval. They had an only daughter, Maria Margarida de Lorena (likewise created Duchess of Abrantes), who married her uncle (Ana Maria's brother), Dom Joaquim Francisco de Sá Almeida e Menezes, 2nd Marquis of Abrantes.

== See also ==
- Dukedoms in Portugal

== Bibliography ==
- ”Nobreza de Portugal e do Brasil" – Vol. II, page 205. Published by Zairol Lda., Lisbon 1989.

Portuguese nobility
Preceded by New title	Duchess of Abrantes; 1753–1761	Succeeded by For life
Preceded by Joaquim Francisco de Sá Almeida e Menezes, 2nd Marquis	Marquis of Abrantes; 1756–1761	Succeeded by Maria Margarida de Lorena, 4th Marchioness
Preceded by Joaquim Francisco de Sá Almeida e Menezes, 8th Count	Count of Penaguião; 1756–1761	Succeeded by Maria Margarida de Lorena, 10th Countess
