= Duke of Abrantes =

Duke of Abrantes may refer to:

- Duke of Abrantes (1642), a title of Spanish nobility created in 1642
- Duke of Abrantes (1753), a title of Portuguese nobility created in 1753
- Duke of Abrantès, a title of Napoleonic nobility created in 1808
