= Sá =

Sá is a Portuguese and Galician surname, derived from places in Portugal and Galicia named Sá or Sa.

== People ==
- Alfredo de Sá, Portuguese politician and Prime Minister during the First Republic
- André Sá, Brazilian tennis player
- Armando Sá; Mozambican footballer
- Ary de Sá, Brazilian long jumper
- Bernardo de Sá, Portuguese politician and Prime Minister during the Constitutional Monarchy
- Estácio de Sá, Portuguese military officer and founder of Rio de Janeiro in Brazil
- Francisco de Sá, Portuguese politician and former Prime Minister
- Francisco de Sá, Portuguese poet of the Renaissance
- Francisco Sá, retired Argentine footballer
- Gustavo Sá, Brazilian footballer
- José Sá, Portuguese footballer
- Luiza Sá, Brazilian musician
- Manuel de Sá, Portuguese Jesuit theologian and exegete
- Mário de Sá, Portuguese poet and writer
- Mem de Sá, Portuguese Governor-General of Brazil
- Ricardo Sá, Portuguese retired footballer
- Roberta Sá, also known as Roberta de Sá, Brazilian singer
- Roger De Sá, South African football manager
- Rui de Sá, Angolan politician
- Pedro Sá, Portuguese footballer
- Sandra de Sá, Brazilian singer and songwriter
- Sílvio Sá, Portuguese footballer
- Wanda Sá, Brazilian bossa nova singer and guitarist

== Other ==
- Bacalhau à Gomes de Sá, traditional Portuguese dry cod recipe named for Gomes de Sá
- Coronel João Sá, municipality in the state of Bahia in the North-East region of Brazil
- Escola Secundária Sá de Miranda, Portuguese Public school in civil parish of São Vicente, in the municipality of Braga
- Estácio de Sá Futebol Clube, Brazilian football team
- Escola de Samba Estácio de Sá, samba school of the city of Rio de Janeiro, Brazil
- Francisco Sá, municipality in the north of the Brazilian state of Minas Gerais
- Francisco de Sá Carneiro Airport, in Porto, Portugal
- Sá da Bandeira, capital city of the Angolan province of Huíla
- Senador Sá, municipality in the state of Ceará in the Northeast region of Brazil
- Universidade Estácio de Sá, University in Rio de Janeiro, Brazil
