= Count of Abrantes =

Noble title in the Kingdom of Portugal

Count of Abrantes (Portuguese: Conde de Abrantes) was a Portuguese title of nobility created by a royal decree, dated from June 13, 1476, by King Afonso V of Portugal, and granted to his 4th cousin, Lopo de Almeida.

Dom Lopo was closely related to the Portuguese royal House, once his great-grandfather was Infante João, Duke of Valencia de Campos (son of King Peter I of Portugal and of Inês de Castro).

This title became extinct when the 4th Count, Miguel de Almeida, a hero of the Portuguese uprising of December 1, 1640, died without issue in 1650.

== Genealogical summary ==
Pedro I (1320–1367); King of Portugal
Fernando I (1345–1383); King of Portugal	Infante João (1349–1397); Duke of Valencia de Campos (Spanish title)	João I (1357–1433); King of Portugal
Beatrice (1372–1408); Queen de jure	Pedro da Guerra (c.1380- ? )	Duarte I (1391–1438); King of Portugal
Brites Anes (c.1380-1431) m.Diogo Fernandes de Almeida; Mayor of Abrantes
Lopo de Almeida (1416–1486); 1st Count of Abrantes	Portuguese Royal House

== List of counts of Abrantes (1476) ==
- Lopo de Almeida (1416–1486), 1st Count of Abrantes
- João de Almeida (1445–1512), 2nd Count of Abrantes (son of the previous)
- Lopo de Almeida (1470- ? ), 3rd Count of Abrantes (son of the previous)
- Miguel de Almeida (1575–1650), 4th Count of Abrantes (2nd cousin of the previous)

== Family name ==
Coat of Arms of the Almeida family, Counts of Abrantes

The family name associated with the Counts of Abrantes was Almeida.

The Almeida clan was closely associated with King John II of Portugal and played a pivotal role in the 1490s succession crisis after the death of John's son, Prince Alfonso. They strongly backed John's preferred candidate, his illegitimate son Jorge de Lencastre, against the eventual winner, Manuel, Duke of Beja.

According to Subrahmanyam (1997: 49), Lopo de Almeida, the first Count of Abrantes, had at least six notable sons:

1. D. João de Almeida - 2nd Count of Abrantes married D. Inês de Noronha (a niece of Christopher Columbus)
2. D. Diogo Fernandes de Almeida - tutor of Jorge de Lencastre and, from 1492, Prior of Crato (Portuguese branch of St. John Hospitaller).
3. D. Jorge de Almeida, Bishop of Coimbra from mid-1490s.
4. D. Pedro da Silva - used his mother's surname, sent on king's 1494 mission to Pope Alexander VI.
5. D. Fernando de Almeida - sent with Pedro on the papal mission.
6. D. Francisco de Almeida - commander of 1505 expedition to India, first Vice-roy of Portuguese India.

The Almeida clan remained the principal political opponents of Manuel I of Portugal throughout his reign.

== See also ==
- List of countships in Portugal

== Bibliography ==
- "Nobreza de Portugal e do Brasil" – Vol. II, pages 203/205. Zairol Lda., Lisboa 1989.
- Subrahmanyam, S. (1997) The Career and Legend of Vasco da Gama. Cambridge, UK: Cambridge University Press.
