= Afonso of Lencastre =

Afonso de Lencastre
- Marquess of Puerto Seguro
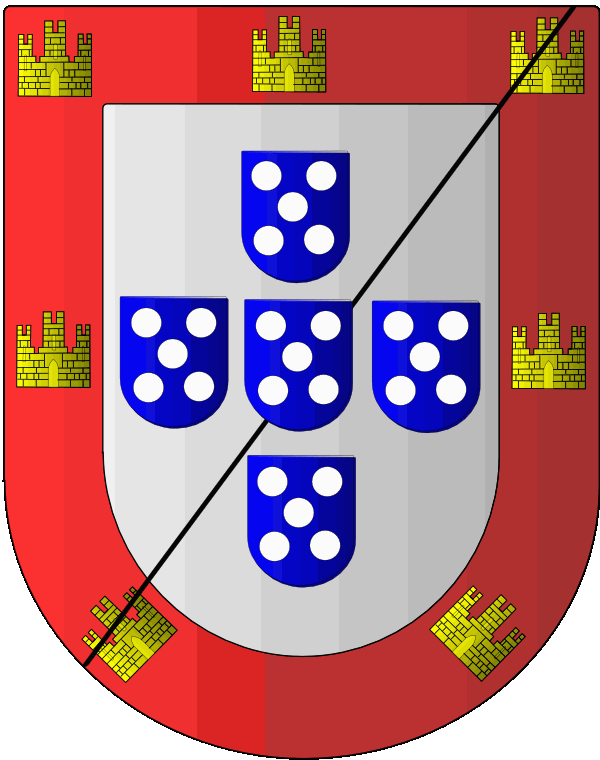
- Coat of arms of Lencastre dukes of Aveiro
- Born: 1597; Azeitão
- Died: 1654 (aged 56–57)
- Spouse: Ana de Sande de Padilla
- Issue: Agustin; Maria
- House: House of Aviz
- Father: Álvaro, 3rd Duke of Aveiro
- Mother: Juliana de Lencastre

Afonso of Lencastre (1597–1654) was a Portuguese nobleman, son of the 3rd Dukes of Aveiro, Álvaro and Juliana of Lencastre. This family descended from the Infante George of Lencastre, therefore they had royal blood.

By a royal decree dated from 8 April 1627, King Philip III of Portugal (aka Philip IV of Spain) granted him the new title of Marquess of Puerto Seguro.

In spite of the Portuguese revolution of 1 December 1640, Afonso remained faithful to the Spanish Habsburgs. To reward his fidelity, King Philip IV granted him, by a decree issued on 23 March 1642, the new titles of Duke of Abrantes and Marquis of Sardoal. However, as Philip IV was no longer King of Portugal, these two titles were never recognise by the Portuguese authorities.

D. Afonso was born in his family palace, in Azeitão (near Setúbal), Portugal, and, on 15 July 1627, he married a Spanish lady, Ana de Sande de Padilla, 2nd Marchioness of Valdefuentes. They had 4 children:

1. Alvaro (1630- ? ), died in childhood;
2. Luís, died in childhood;
3. Agustin de Lencastre Padilla y Bobadilla (1639–1720), Duke of Abrantes. Married to Joana de Noronha de Silva and had a daughter Maria Josefa Lancastre throuh which he had a grandson José de Carvajal y Lancáster.
4. Maria (1639–1692), married in 1654 to the Spanish Pedro de Leiva-Lacerda, Marquis de Landrada.

== Ancestry ==
Ancestors of Afonso of Lencastre

16. John II of Portugal
8. George of Lencastre, Duke of Coimbra
17. Ana de Mendonça
4. Afonso of Lencastre
18. Álvaro of Braganza
9. Beatriz de Vilhena
19. Filipa de Melo
2. Álvaro of Lencastre
5. Isabel Henriques
1. Afonso of Lencastre
24. George of Lencastre, Duke of Coimbra
12. John of Lencastre
25. Beatriz de Vilhena
6. George of Lencastre, 2nd Duke of Aveiro
3. Juliana of Lencastre
7. Madalena Tellez Giron

== Bibliography ==
- "Nobreza de Portugal e do Brasil" – Vol. III, page 173. Published by Zairol Lda., Lisbon 1989.
