= Jácome de Olivares =

16th-century Portuguese–Jewish merchant and informant for the Ottoman Empire

- Born: fl. 1540; Setúbal, Kingdom of Portugal
- Died: fl. 1571; Ottoman Empire ?
- Occupations: Merchant, spy
- Opponent: Rodrigo Àlvares
- Spouse: Maria Nunes
- Parent(s): Violante Lopes; António de Olivares

Jácome de Olivares (fl. 1540 – fl. 1571) was a Cochin Jew who converted to Catholicism in Portugal (converso). He later re-converted to Judaism after fleeing to the Ottoman Empire in 1571. Olivares was mostly active as a merchant, and spied for the Ottoman Sultan Selim II in Kochi, Portuguese India. He was part of Joseph Nasi's worldwide network of spies for the Ottoman Empire.

== Family ==
Olivares was a native of Setúbal and was a Sephardic Jew. His mother was a New Christian by the name of Violante Lopes. His father, António de Olivares, was an Old Christian who was an important figure in town as he was squire of the household of the Grand Master of the Order of Santiago.

In 1550, Olivares married into a New Christian family. His wife's name was Maria Nunes, daughter of Leonor Dias, who died in 1552. Leonor and her husband had moved to Kochi from Lisbon, where they had been baptised. They were forcibly converted, and thus were Marranos.

== Early life and career ==
Olivares was baptised in his native city of Setúbal in the church of São Julião. He was said to be an ardent Christian, and served the Grand Master of Santiago, João de Lencastre, 1st Duke of Aveiro, and his son, George of Lencastre, 2nd Duke of Aveiro. Olivares left for India on the Sāo Filipe in 1540. He lived in Kochi for nine years, with most of his time being spent at sea. Olivares served Governors of Portuguese India Estêvão da Gama and Martim Afonso de Sousa, as did his brother-in-law, Diogo Vaz.

Olivares was imprisoned in Malacca in 1557 on suspicion of being a practicing Jew. He claimed that it was his enemy, Rodrigo Àlvares, nephew of his brother-in-law, who convinced authorities to imprison him. Olivares was an extremely successful and rich trader at the time, with extensive ties across India and beyond. He was also a slave owner, having owned multiple. Olivares was transferred to Goa for an interrogation between 1558 and 1559. It was noted from his interrogations that Olivares 'knows how to write very well and is very crafty' This would have been seen as a threat since widespread literacy was believed by many before the modern age to have inspired dissatisfaction and produced insurrection and rebellion, such as with slaves in Southern United States. Olivares was then sent to Lisbon alongside other New Christians, some of whom were members of his family. He was handed over to the bailiff of the prison of the Inquisition in Lisbon on 12 August 1560. He would be interrogated there from December 1560 to 16 March 1561, where he was sentenced to auto-da-fé.

Oliveras tried to prove his innocence by stating that he was a zealous Christian, which is evidenced by his experiences in Kochi. Franciscan friar Diogo do Monte Olivete from Kochi said the following in his testimony in court regarding Oliveras:

"And thus he knows him to have always been well behaved, and very regular in the houses of the monasteries, principally in this monastery (Santo António), where he, the accused, came many times to play the organ at vespers and masses."

However, this was all an attempt of Olivares to convince people that he was a Christian. Olivares was in fact a Marrano, practicing Judaism secretly while espousing Christian ideals in public. This is especially evident with Olivares actively participating in Purim with the Jews of Kochi, in which the figure of Jesus was reviled.

Olivares was imprisoned for four years by now, and had lost his fortune. He had also lost a few of his children while imprisoned. On 16 March 1561, Olivares was sentenced to life imprisonment, alongside his wife. Both of them were forced to attend mass and engage in Christian gatherings.

== Life in the Ottoman Empire ==
It is not known how, but in 1571, Olivares escaped to Istanbul in order to flee Portuguese persecution, much like Simão Correia, who was also a Jew in India who fled to the Ottoman Empire, later serving as a court physician. There, Olivares would re-convert to Judaism. Olivares acted as a spy for the Ottoman Empire in India, informing Sultan Selim II of developments in Portugal and their plans in India. He regularly reported his findings to Joseph Nasi, a fabulously rich Ottoman–Jewish businessman who was a loyal servant of the Sublime Porte.

Olivares was an invaluable asset for the Ottomans since Ottoman–Portuguese relations were at an all-time low during this period due to competition over territories such as East Africa, Aceh, Aden (and thus the Red Sea), and the Indian Ocean. Therefore, any intelligence gathered on the country would have been pivotal for the Sultan.
