= Gabriel, 7th Duke of Aveiro =

Duke of Aveiro

Gabriel de Lencastre Ponce de León Manrique de Lara Cádenas Girón y Aragon (1667–1745 Dom Gabriel of Lencastre) was the Portuguese Duke of Aveiro and became the Spanish Duke of Baños after his service in the Spanish Army.

He was the 2nd son of Manuel Ponce de León, 6th Duke of Los Arcos, in Spain, and Maria de Guadalupe of Lencastre, 6th Duchess of Aveiro.

His mother was the Duchess of Aveiro, elevated in 1679, on the condition she return to Portugal. Due to her husband's opposition, she divorced him, returned to her homeland and regained the House of Aveiro and their estates.

Their elder son, Don Joaquín, inherited the Spanish House of the Dukes of Los Arcos, while the younger, Dom Gabriel, inherited the Portuguese House of the Dukes of Aveiro. After his mother's death (1715), he came to Portugal.

While he lived in Spain, King Charles II granted him the title of Duke of Baños, and he served in the Spanish army, in the Catalonia and in the Flanders campaigns.

He died single without issue.

After his death the Duchy was claimed by his nephew, António de Lencastre Ponce de León (son of Joaquin 7th Duke of Los Arcos), and by José de Mascarenhas, 8th Count of Santa Cruz and 5th Marquis of Gouveia (descending from Álvaro and Juliana of Lencastre through female line).

Portuguese nobility
| Preceded by Maria de Guadalupe of Lencastre | Duke of Aveiro; 1715–45 | Succeeded by José de Mascarenhas da Silva e Lencastre |

== See also ==
- Duke of Aveiro
- Duke of Torres Novas
- Marquis of Torres Novas
