= Álvaro, 3rd Duke of Aveiro =

Álvaro of Lencastre
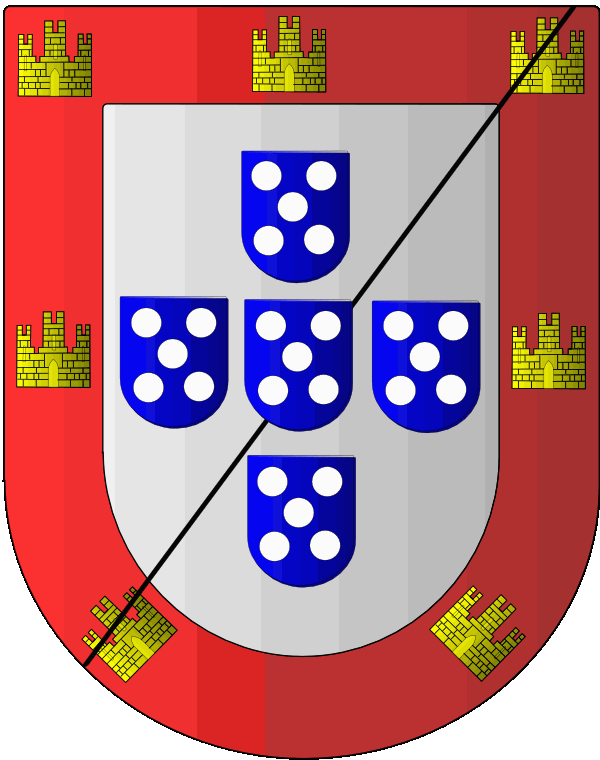
- Coat of arms of Lencastre dukes of Aveiro

3rd Duke of Aveiro
- Reign: 1598 - 1626
- Predecessor: George, 2nd Duke of Aveiro
- Successor: Raimundo, 4th Duke of Aveiro
- Born: 1540
- Died: 1626 (aged 85–86)
- Spouse: Juliana of Lencastre
- Issue: George, 1st Duke of Torres Novas; Afonso of Lencastre; Madalena; Maria; Violante; Peter, 5th Duke of Aveiro; Louís
- House: House of Aviz
- Father: Afonso of Lencastre

Álvaro of Lencastre (1540–1626) was the son of Afonso of Lencastre, second son of infante George of Lencastre, 2nd Duke of Coimbra.

== Disputed inheritance ==
When George of Lencastre, 2nd Duke of Aveiro died, in 1578 in the Battle of Alcácer Quibir, together with King Sebastian I of Portugal and most Portuguese nobles, the Dukedom of Aveiro was claimed by two pretenders:

- his daughter, Juliana of Lencastre (1560–1636);
- his cousin, Álvaro of Lencastre (1540–1626), his closest male relative, son of Alphonse of Lencastre (Afonso de Lencastre), 2nd son of Infante George of Lencastre.

According to the Lei Mental ("Mental Law"), (Note: This law is so named because it was already in King John I's mind, but it was published only by his son and successor, King Duarte I, in 1434) females could not inherit their father’s lands and fiefs (except with a specific royal permission). That was why Álvaro of Lencastre claimed his cousin's inheritance, to prevent the extinction of such a remarkable aristocratic House.

This dispute took about 2 decades, and finally, King Philip I of Portugal (also known as Philip II of Spain) decided that Dom Álvaro should marry his cousin, Dona Juliana, in order to inherit his family titles and estates, and they became jointly 3rd Dukes of Aveiro.

This marriage took place in 1598 and, for that occasion, the King granted the Dukes special honours:

- Duke of Aveiro became a de juro e herdade title (which meant that the King was obliged to renew the title in its rightful heir);
- the new title of Duke of Torres Novas was granted to the Duke of Aveiro’s heir;
- the official Honorific style of Excellency, granted to the House of Braganza in 1579, was also granted to this House

The Ducal Palace was located in Azeitão, where, attached to the palace, they also built a hospital. They granted a huge protection to the Arrábida convent, founded by the 1st Duke, John of Lencastre, where they both are buried.

The couple had sixteen children:

- George of Lencastre, 1st Duke of Torres Novas (1594–1632), died before his mother, so he never inherited the Dukedom of Aveiro, which passed to his older son;
- Afonso of Lencastre (1597- ? ), Marquis of Porto Seguro, Marquis of Sardoal and 1st Duke of Abrantes (the last two as Spanish titles);
- Madalena of Lencastre (1599- ? ), married to Dinis de Faro, 3rd Count of Faro;
- Maria of Lencastre (1602- ? ), married to Manrique Silva, 1st Marquis of Gouveia;
- Violante of Lencastre (1604- ? ), married to Lourenço Pires de Castro, 3rd Count of Basto;
- Peter of Lencastre (1608–1673), Archbishop of Évora, who later became 5th Duke of Aveiro, after his nephew’s death;
- Luís of Lencastre (1609–1673), married to Teresa Maria Saavedra, 4th Marchioness of Malagón, in Spain;
- 2 sons were priests;
- 4 daughters were nuns;
- 3 children died young.

== Ancestors ==
Ancestors of Álvaro, 3rd Duke of Aveiro

16. Afonso V of Portugal
8. John II of Portugal
17. Isabel of Coimbra
4. George of Lencastre, Duke of Coimbra
18. Nuno Furtado de Mendonça
9. Ana de Mendonça
19. Leonor da Silva
2. Afonso of Lencastre
20. Fernando I of Braganza
10. Álvaro of Braganza
21. Joana de Castro
5. Beatriz de Vilhena
22. Rodrigo Afonso de Melo
11. Filipa de Melo
23. Isabel de Meneses
1. Álvaro of Lencastre
3. Isabel Henriques

== See also ==
- Infante George of Lencastre
- Duke of Aveiro
- Duke of Torres Novas
- Marquis of Torres Novas

== Bibliography ==
- Nobreza de Portugal e do Brasil (in Portuguese). Vol. II. Lisbon: Zairol Lda. 1989. pp. 343–344.

Portuguese nobility
Preceded by George of Lencastre	Duke of Aveiro; Álvaro 1598—1626 and Juliana 1598—1636	Succeeded by Raimundo of Lencastre
