= Maria de Guadalupe, 6th Duchess of Aveiro =

6th Duchess of Aveiro

Dona Maria de Guadalupe of Lencastre y Cárdenas Manrique (Azeitao, Portugal 1630 – Madrid, Spain 1715), was a Portuguese noblewoman, notable as an heiress who funded Catholic missions and missionaries in Asia, the Pacific, and Africa.

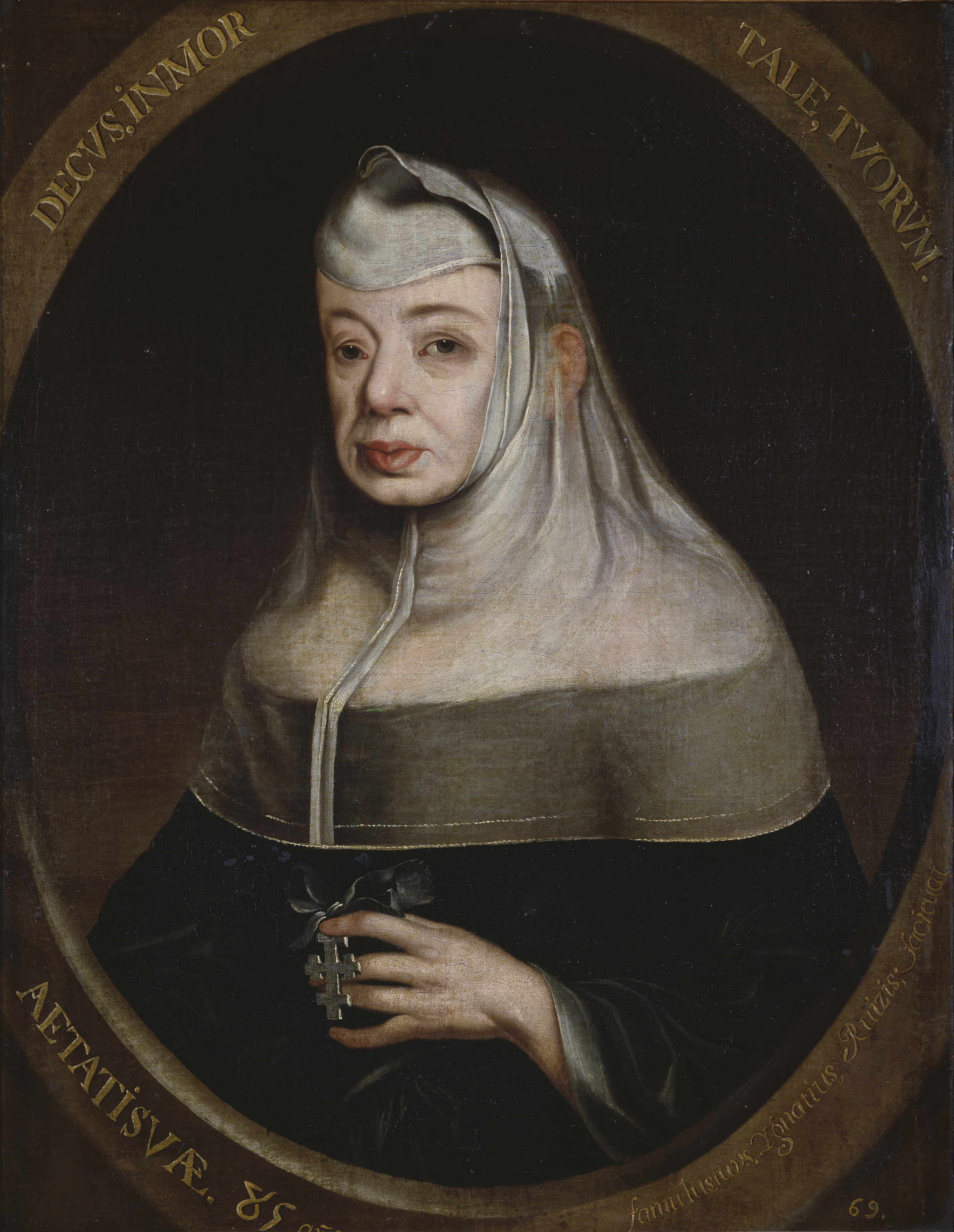
Portrait by Francisco Ignacio Ruiz de la Iglesia, c.1700

== Biography ==
Born in Azeitão in 1630, she was the daughter of George of Lencastre, 1st Duke of Torres Novas and of Ana Maria de Cárdenas y Manrique de Lara, daughter of the Spanish 3rd Duque of Maqueda (whose mother was a Braganza lady). She was the younger sister of Raimundo of Lencastre, 4th Duke of Aveiro.

Her brother supported the Spanish Habsburgs, even after the Braganzas expelled them from the Portuguese throne in 1640, and she followed her brother and mother to the exile in Madrid. There, they were welcomed by King Philip IV of Spain, while in Lisbon, her brother was condemned for treason (in 1663) and the King of Portugal, John IV of Portugal, confiscated the Duchy and granted it to Raimundo and Guadalupe's uncle, Peter of Lencastre, a Braganza supporter, who was recognised as 5th Duke of Aveiro and 5th Marquis of Torres Novas.

Maria de Guadalupe married the Spanish 6th Duke of Los Arcos, Manuel Ponce de León, but it was established that the Spanish House of the Dukes of Los Arcos and the Portuguese House of the Dukes of Aveiro should remain forever separated. When the peace between Portugal and Spain was signed, Maria de Guadalupe of Lencastre requested the cancellation of the decision that granted the Duchy of Aveiro to her uncle, in order to obtain it for herself. She was recognized as 6th Duchess of Aveiro when her uncle died (1673), on the condition she would return to Portugal.

Due to her husband's opposition, she divorced him, returned to her homeland and regained the House of Aveiro and their estates. While waiting for the divorce in Spain, King Carlos II of Spain tried to avoid her return to Portugal by granting her, in 1681, the title of Duchess of Aveyro (Spanish spelling) as a Spanish title. She died in Madrid in 1715.

She left behind three children from her marriage with don Manuel Ponce de León:

- Joaquín Ponce de León y Lancastre ( ? – 1729), who succeeded his father as 7th Duke of Los Arcos;
- Gabriel Ponce de Leon de Lencastre (1667–1745), who succeeded his mother as 7th Duke of Aveiro;
- Isabel Zacarias Ponce de León y Lancastre (1669–1721), who was married twice, firstly to Antonio Alvarez de Toledo, 9th Duke of Alba, and secondly to Francesco Gonzaga, 1st Duke of Solferino. She and Antonio had three children.

== See also ==
- Duke of Aveiro
- Duke of Torres Novas
- Marquis of Torres Novas

== Bibliography ==
- Boxer, C. R. "'The Mother of the Missions'." History Today (Oct 1973), Vol. 23 Issue 10, pp 733–739 online.
- ”Nobreza de Portugal e do Brasil" – Vol. II, page 345. Published by Zairol Lda., Lisbon 1989.

Portuguese nobility
Preceded by Peter of Lencastre	Duchess of Aveiro; 1673–1715	Succeeded by Gabriel of Lencastre
