= Peter, 5th Duke of Aveiro =

Peter de Lencastre
- marquis of Torres Novas
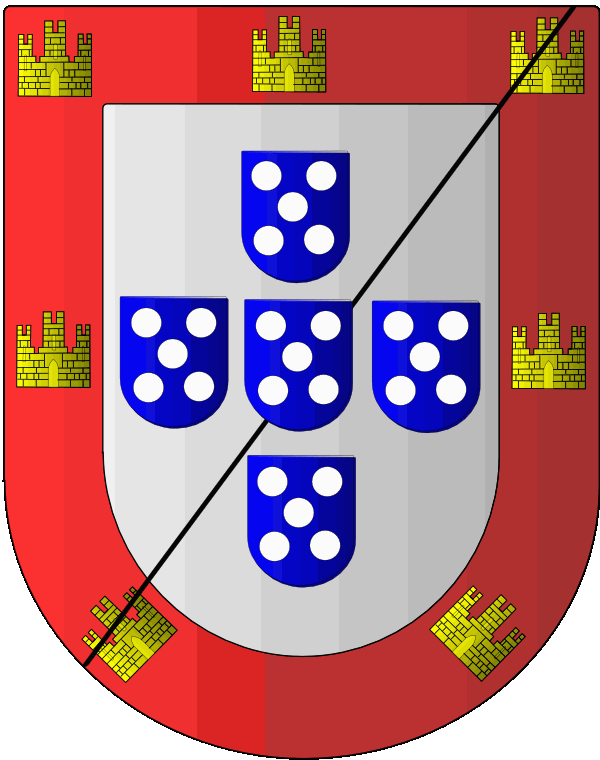
- Coat of arms of Lencastre dukes of Aveiro

5th Duke of Aveiro
- Reign: 1666–1673
- Predecessor: Raimundo, 4th Duke of Aveiro
- Successor: Maria de Guadalupe, 6th Duchess of Aveiro
- Born: 1608; Azeitão
- Died: 1673; Lisbon
- House: House of Aviz
- Father: Álvaro, 3rd Duke of Aveiro
- Mother: Juliana de Lencastre

Pedro de Lencastre, or Peter of Lencastre (Azeitão, 1608 – Lisbon, 1673), was the youngest son of Álvaro and Juliana of Lencastre, 3rd Dukes of Aveiro.

He studied theology in the University of Coimbra and he became successively Bishop of Guarda, Archbishop of Évora and Archbishop of Braga.

In spite of the Portuguese revolution against the Spanish Habsburgs, his nephew, Raimundo of Lencastre, 4th Duke of Aveiro actively supported the rights of the Habsburg Kings and, in 1663, the new King of the Braganza Dynasty, John IV, decided to confiscate the Dukedom.

However, Peter of Lencastre, a Braganza supporter, requested the cancellation of this decision and, finally in 1668, he was recognised as 5th Duke of Aveiro and Marquis of Torres Novas.

Later the same year, when the peace between Portugal and Spain was signed, Peter's niece, Maria de Guadalupe of Lencastre, sister and heir of the 4th Duke, requested the cancellation of the decision that granted the Dukedom of Aveiro to her uncle, in order to obtain it for herself.

Due to Peter of Lencastre's death in 1673, Maria de Guadalupe of Lencastre, still living in Spain, was recognised as the new Duchess of Aveiro on condition she would return to Portugal.

Portuguese nobility
Preceded by Raimundo of Lencastre	Marquis of Torres Novas; 1636–1666	Succeeded by last holder of the Marquisate
Preceded by Raimundo of Lencastre	Duke of Aveiro; 1666–1673	Succeeded by Maria de Guadalupe of Lencastre
Catholic Church titles
Preceded by Diogo Lobo	Bishop of Guarda; 1643–1648	Succeeded by Álvaro de São Boaventura
Preceded by João Coutinho	Archbishop of Évora; 1648–1654	Succeeded by Diogo de Sousa
Preceded by Sebastião de Matos de Noronha	Archbishop of Braga; 1654–1670	Succeeded by Veríssimo de Lencastre

== See also ==
- Infante George of Lencastre
- Duke of Aveiro
- Marquis of Torres Novas

== Bibliography ==
- ”Nobreza de Portugal e do Brasil" – Vol. II, page 345. Published by Zairol Lda., Lisbon 1989.
