= Natividad =

Natividad (Spanish for "Nativity") may refer to:

- Natividad, California, USA
- Natividad, Pangasinan, Philippines
- General Mamerto Natividad, Nueva Ecija, Philippines
- Natividad, Oaxaca, Mexico
- Isla Natividad, a Pacific island west of Baja California Sur, Mexico
- Natividad, a fictional ship in the Horatio Hornblower novel The Happy Return by C. S. Forester
- Convento de la Natividad y San José, a former convent in Madrid
