= Duke of Aveiro =

Aristocratic Portuguese title (1535-1759)

Dukedom of Aveiro
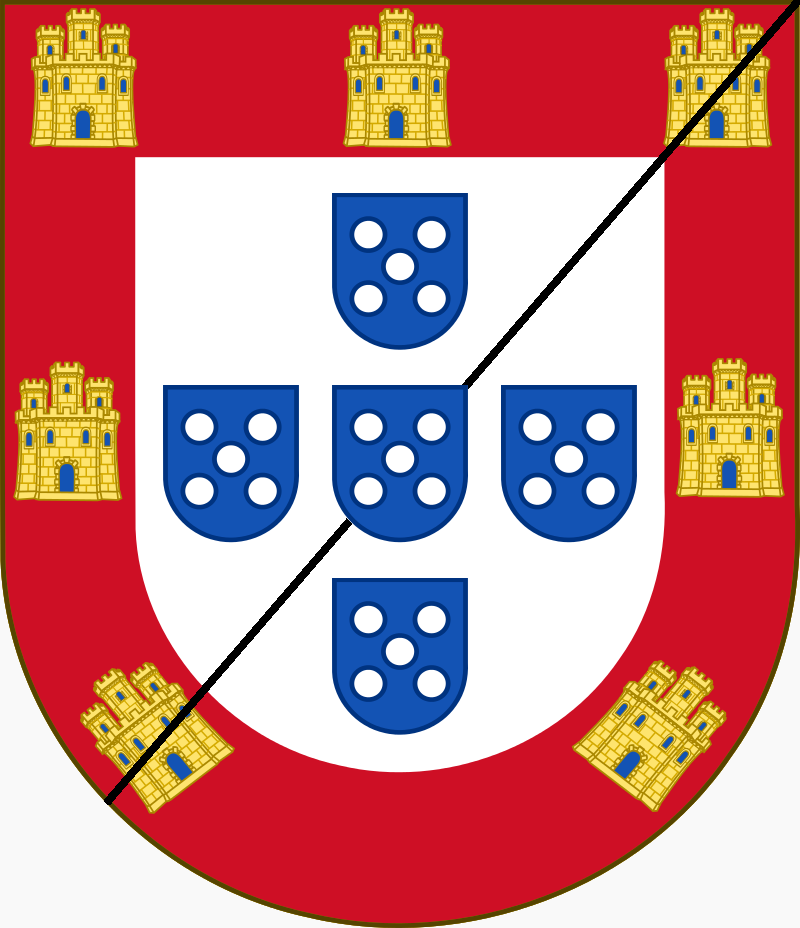
- Creation date: 1535
- Created by: John III of Portugal
- First holder: João, 1st Duke of Aveiro
- Last holder: José de Mascarenhas da Silva e Lancastre, 8th Duke of Aveiro
- Subsidiary titles: Marquis of Torres Novas; Marquis of Lavradio; Count of Alcáçovas
- Extinction date: 1759

Duke of Aveiro (Portuguese: Duque de Aveiro) was a Portuguese title of nobility, granted in 1535 by King John III of Portugal to his 2nd cousin, John of Lencastre, son of Infante George of Lencastre, a natural son of King John II of Portugal.

John of Lencastre was already Marquis of Torres Novas when the King granted him the new title of Duke of Aveiro. Later, their descendants strongly supported Philip II of Spain during the 1580 Portuguese succession crisis. Thus the Dukes became the second aristocratic House of Portugal, after the Braganzas.

Raimundo of Lencastre, 4th Duke of Aveiro maintained his House's traditional support for the Habsburg monarchy, even after the 1640 national revolution in Portugal. Therefore the Aveiro property was confiscated by the new Kings of the Braganza Dynasty, and granted in 1668 to his uncle, Peter of Lencastre, who already was Archbishop of Évora and general Inquisitor, becoming 5th Duke of Aveiro. He died in 1673 without issue.

The succession was given to his niece, Maria de Guadalupe of Lencastre, who was married to the Spanish Duke of Los Arcos. She returned to Portugal with her younger son, while her husband and her older son stayed in Spain. She regained the control of her House and estates and recognised the suzerainty of the House of Braganza.

Due to the alleged participation of the 8th Duke of Aveiro in the Távora affair (a conspiracy against the King), all the possessions of the Dukes of Aveiro were confiscated, their coat-of-arms destroyed from the public places, their houses demolished and their lands salted. Only the Palace of the Dukes of Aveiro in Azeitão, Portugal remains (albeit with the destroyed coat of arms on its facade) as a testament to the family's previous might and power.

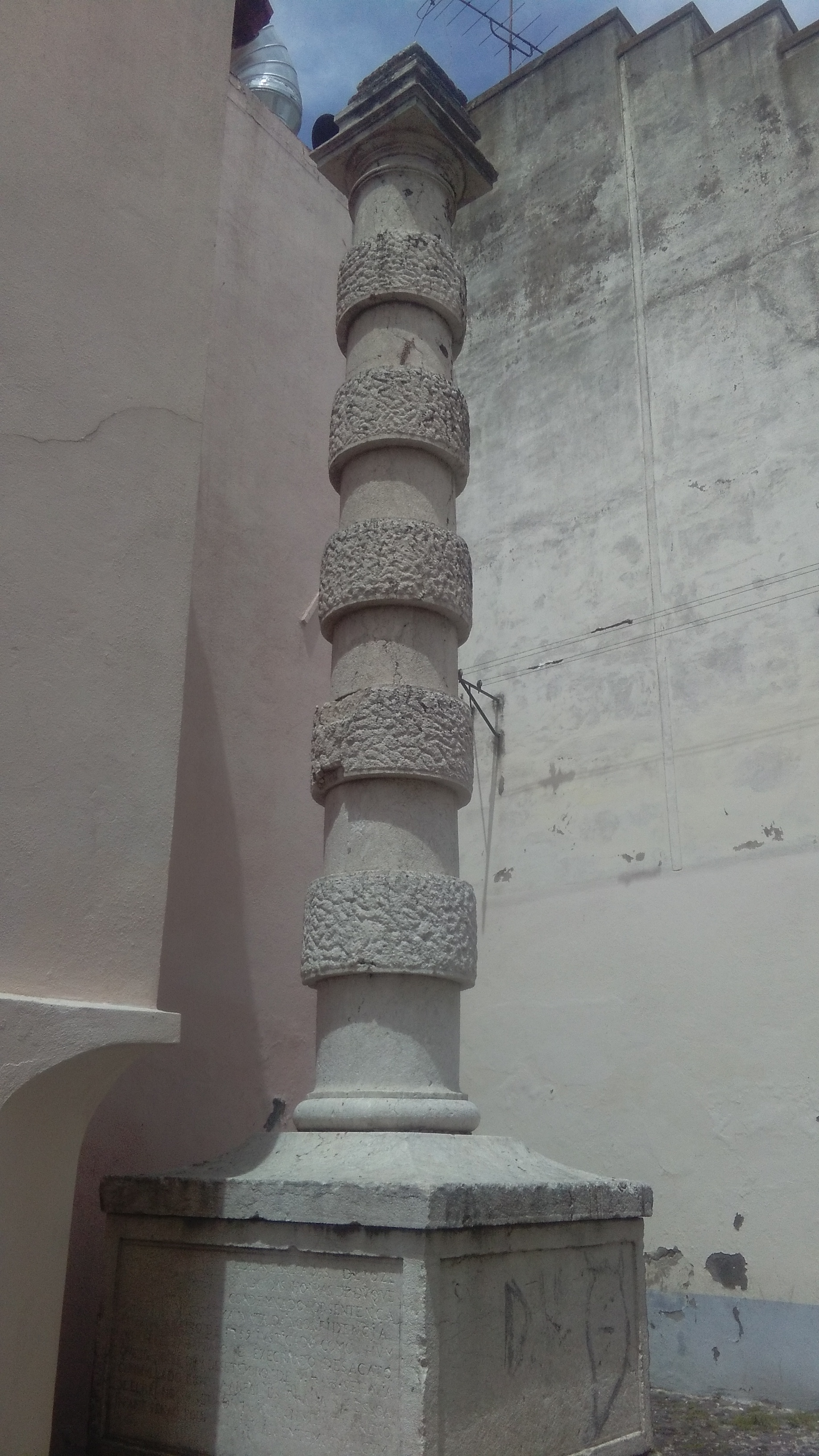
Stone memorial of Aveiro's shame in Belém, Lisbon.

The Aveiro palace in Lisbon, demolished and salted, gave place to a stone memorial in order to perpetuate the memory of the shame of the House of Aveiro. In it the following text can be read (in Portuguese): Aqui foram arrasadas e salgadas as casas de José Mascarenhas, exautorado das honras de Duque de Aveiro e outras condemnado por sentença proferida na Suprema Juncta de Inconfidencia em 12 de Janeiro de 1759. Justiçado como um dos chefes do barbaro e execrando desacato que na noite de 3 de Septembro de 1758 se havia commetido contra a real e sagrada pessoa de D.José I. Neste terreno infame se não poderá edificar em tempo algum. ("In this place were put to the ground and salted the houses of José Mascarenhas, stripped of the honours of Duque de Aveiro and others, convicted by sentence proclaimed in the Supreme Court of Inconfidences on the 12th of January 1759. Put to Justice as one of the leaders of the most barbarous and execrable upheaval that, on the night of the 3rd of September 1758, was committed against the most royal and sacred person of the Lord Joseph I. In this infamous land nothing may be built for all time.")

After 1759 the title became abeyant. In 1939, D. Duarte Nuno, Duke of Braganza, authorized the use of the personal title of Duke of Aveiro to D. Caetano Henriques Pereira Faria Saldanha de Lancastre, Count of Alcáçovas, and of Duke of Torres Novas to his eldest son. On the other hand, the closest existing relatives of José de Mascarenhas da Silva e Lancastre, 8th Duke of Aveiro, are descended from his sister Francisca das Chagas Mascarenhas and her husband the 1st Marquis of Lavradio.

== List of dukes of Aveiro ==
1. John of Lancastre, 1st Duke of Aveiro (1501-1571), son of Infante George, Duke of Coimbra (therefore grandson of King John II of Portugal);
2. George of Lancastre, 2nd Duke of Aveiro (1548-1578, in Alcácer Quibir), son of the previous duke;
3. Juliana of Lancastre, 3rd Duchess of Aveiro (1560-1636), daughter of the previous duke, together with her husband and cousin Álvaro of Lancastre, 3rd Duke of Aveiro (1540-1626);
4. Raimundo of Lancastre, 4th Duke of Aveiro (1620-1666), grandson of the previous dukes;
5. Peter of Lancastre, 5th Duke of Aveiro (1608-1673), son of Álvaro and Juliana of Lencastre, 3rd Dukes of Aveiro. Archbishop of Évora, died without issue;
6. Maria de Guadalupe of Lancastre, 6th Duchess of Aveiro (1630-1715), sister of Raimundo of Lencastre, married the Spanish Manuel Ponce de León, Duke of Arcos;
7. Gabriel of Lancastre, 7th Duke of Aveiro (1667-1745), son of the previous duchess, died without issue.
8. José de Mascarenhas da Silva e Lancastre, 8th Duke of Aveiro (1708-1759), head of the collateral line descended from D. Maria de Lancastre, daughter of the 3rd Dukes of Aveiro. He was executed by the Marquis of Pombal under orders of King Joseph I of Portugal, due to his alleged participation in the Távora affair, a conspiracy against the king.

== Other titles ==
- Duke of Torres Novas
- Marquis of Torres Novas
- Marquis of Lavradio
- Count of Alcáçovas

== Dukes of Aveyro (Spanish title) ==
When Peter of Lencastre, 5th Duke of Aveiro died in 1673, his niece Maria de Guadalupe of Lencastre was finally recognised by the Portuguese King as Duchess of Aveiro in 1679, on condition that she return to Portugal although she was married to the Spanish Duke of Los Arcos. Her husband opposed this; she divorced him, returned to her homeland and regained the House of Aveiro and their estates.

While the divorce was pending, King Carlos II of Spain tried to prevent her return to Portugal by granting her, in 1681, the Spanish title of Duchess of Aveyro (Spanish spelling). This title belongs today to the Spanish Castro family, with no relationship to the Lancastre family of Portugal. It is not a Portuguese title and is entirely separate from its Portuguese homonym.

== Family name ==
The family name associated with the Dukes of Aveiro is Lancastre, referring to King John I's wife Philippa of Lancaster, daughter of John of Gaunt, 1st Duke of Lancaster and head of the House of Lancaster. The Marquess of Lavradio is currently the Chief of Name and Arms of the Lancastre family in Portugal.

== Genealogy ==
Philippa of Lancaster; Queen of Portugal (1360-1415) | João I King of Portugal (1357-1433) | Inês Peres
Duarte; King of Portugal (1391-1438) | Afonso; Duke of Braganza (1377-1461)
Afonso V King of Portugal (1432-1481) | Fernando; Duke of Viseu (1433-1470) | Fernando I Duke of Braganza (1403-1478)
Ana de Mendonça (d.1542) | João II; King of Portugal (1455-1495) | Manuel I King of Portugal (1469-1521) | Fernando II; Duke of Braganza (1430-1483) | Álvaro; Lord of Cadaval (d. 1504)
Jaime; Duke of Braganza (1479-1532) | Jorge de Lencastre; Duke of Coimbra (1481-1550) | Beatriz; Marchioness of Torres Novas (1483-1535)
Duarte; Duke of Guimarães (1515–1540) | Teodósio I Duke of Braganza (1510-1563) | João; 1st Duke of Aveiro (1501-1571) | Afonso; Comendador-mor of São Tiago | Luís; Comendador-mor of Aviz
Catarina; Duchess of Braganza (1540-1614) | João I Duke of Braganza (1543-1583) | Jorge; 2nd Duke of Aveiro (d. 1578) | João; Comendador of Coruche
Teodósio II; Duke of Braganza (1568-1630) | Juliana; 3rd Duchess of Aveiro (1560-1636) | Álvaro; 3rd Duke of Aveiro (1540-1626) | Lourenço; Comendador of Coruche
João IV; King of Portugal (1604-1656) | Jorge; Duke of Torres Novas (1594-1632) | Maria; Marchioness of Gouveia (b. 1602) | Pedro; 5th Duke of Aveiro (1608-1673) | Rodrigo; Comendador of Coruche (1620-1657)
Afonso VI; King of Portugal (1643-1683) | Pedro II; King of Portugal (1648-1706) | Raimundo; 4th Duke of Aveiro (1620-1666) | Maria de Guadalupe; 6th Duchess of Aveiro (1630-1715) | Juliana; Countess of Santa Cruz | João; Governor-general of Brazil (1646-1707)
João V King of Portugal (1689-1750) | Gabriel; 7th Duke of Aveiro (1667-1745) | Martinho; Marquess of Gouveia (d.1723) | Pedro Baltazar de Almeida de Lancastre (1676-1740)
José; King of Portugal (1714-1777) | Francisca das Chagas; Marchioness of Lavradio (1707-1733) | José; 8th Duke of Aveiro (1708-1759) | José; Saldanha de Lancastre (1717-1793)
Maria I Queen of Portugal (1734-1816) | Pedro III; King of Portugal (1717-1786) | Marquessate of Lavradio | Martinho; Marquess of Gouveia (1740-1805) | Caetano Alberto; Lord of Alcáçovas (1755-1822)
João VI; King of Portugal (1767-1826) | Teresa; Lady of Alcáçovas (1788-1821)
Miguel; King of Portugal (1802-1866) | Caetano de Sales; Count of Alcáçovas (1819-1894)
Miguel; Duke of Braganza (1853-1927) | Luís; Count of Alcáçovas (1846-1892)
Duarte Nuno; Duke of Braganza (1907-1976) | Caetano; Count of Alcáçovas (1877-1960)

== See also ==
- Dukedoms in Portugal
- Duke of Torres Novas
- Marquis of Torres Novas

== Bibliography ==
"Nobreza de Portugal e do Brasil" – Vol. II, pages 342/347. Published by Zairol Lda., Lisbon 1989.
