= Church of São João Evangelista (Aveiro) =

Coordinates: 40.6383°N 8.6534°W

- Church of Discalced Carmelites
- Igreja de São João Evangelista
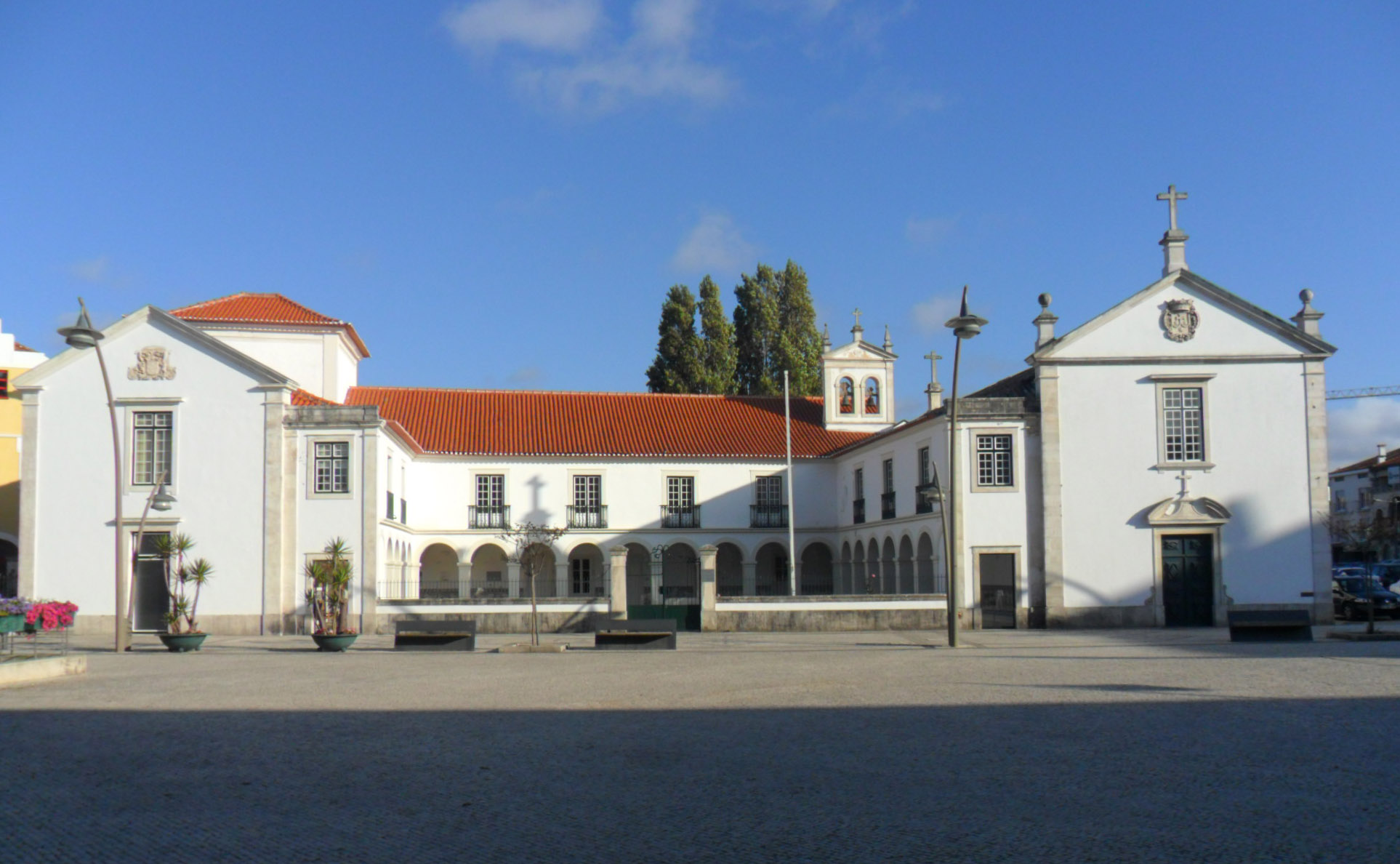
- The Church of São Evangelista (right) and the former annexes of the Carmelite Convent
- Church of São João Evangelista
- Location: Aveiro, Baixo Vouga, Centro
- Country: Portugal

History
- Dedication: John the Evangelist

Architecture
- Style: Baroque, Roccoco

A Church of São João Evangelista (Portuguese: Igreja de São João Evangelista), or Carmelite Church of Aveiro, is an 18th-century church in the Praça Marquês de Pombal, in the civil parish of Glória e Vera Cruz, in the Portuguese municipality of Aveiro. It was declared a national monument in 1910.

== History ==
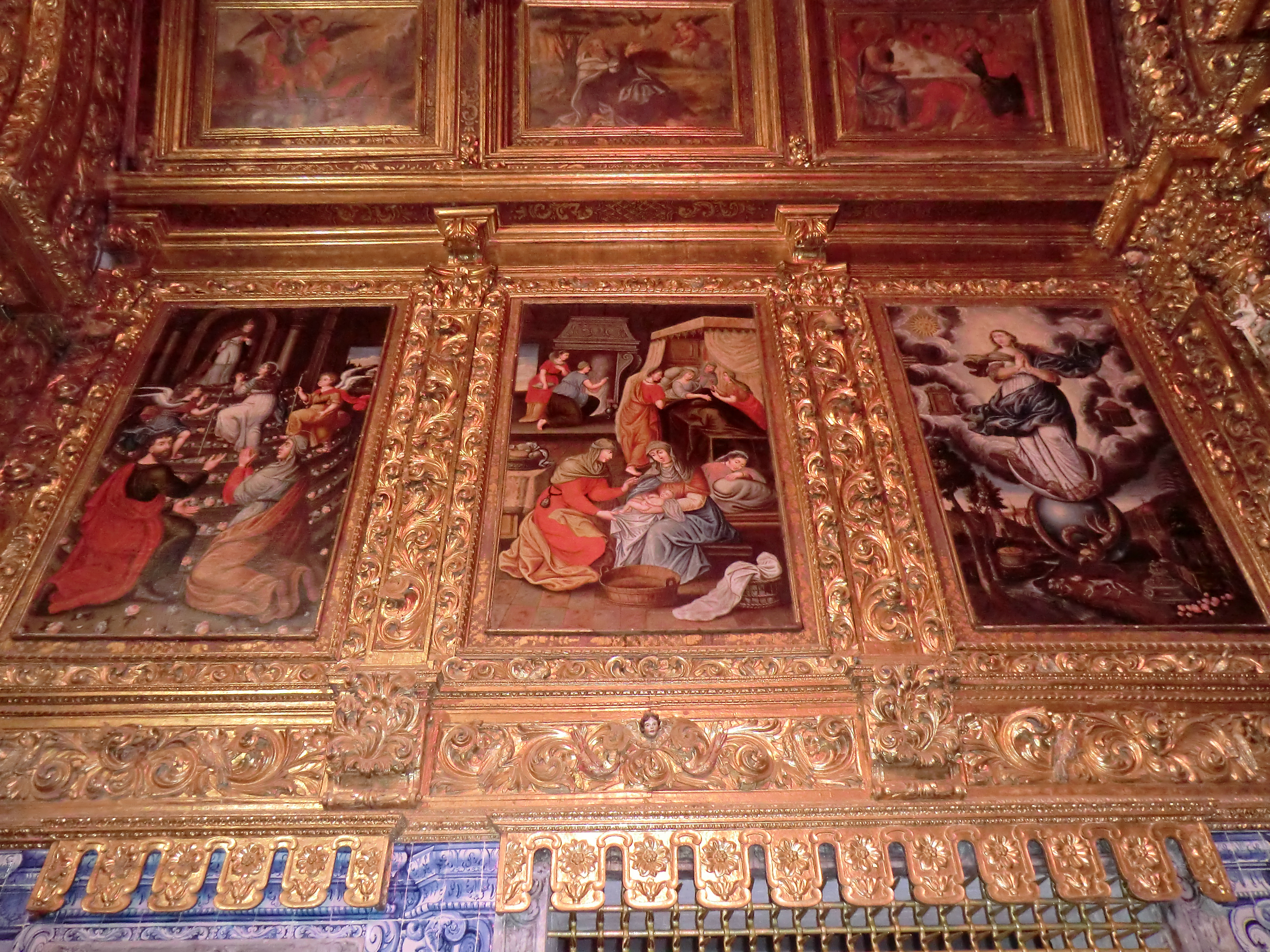
The ornate gild work and paintings depict the Life of the Virgin Mary

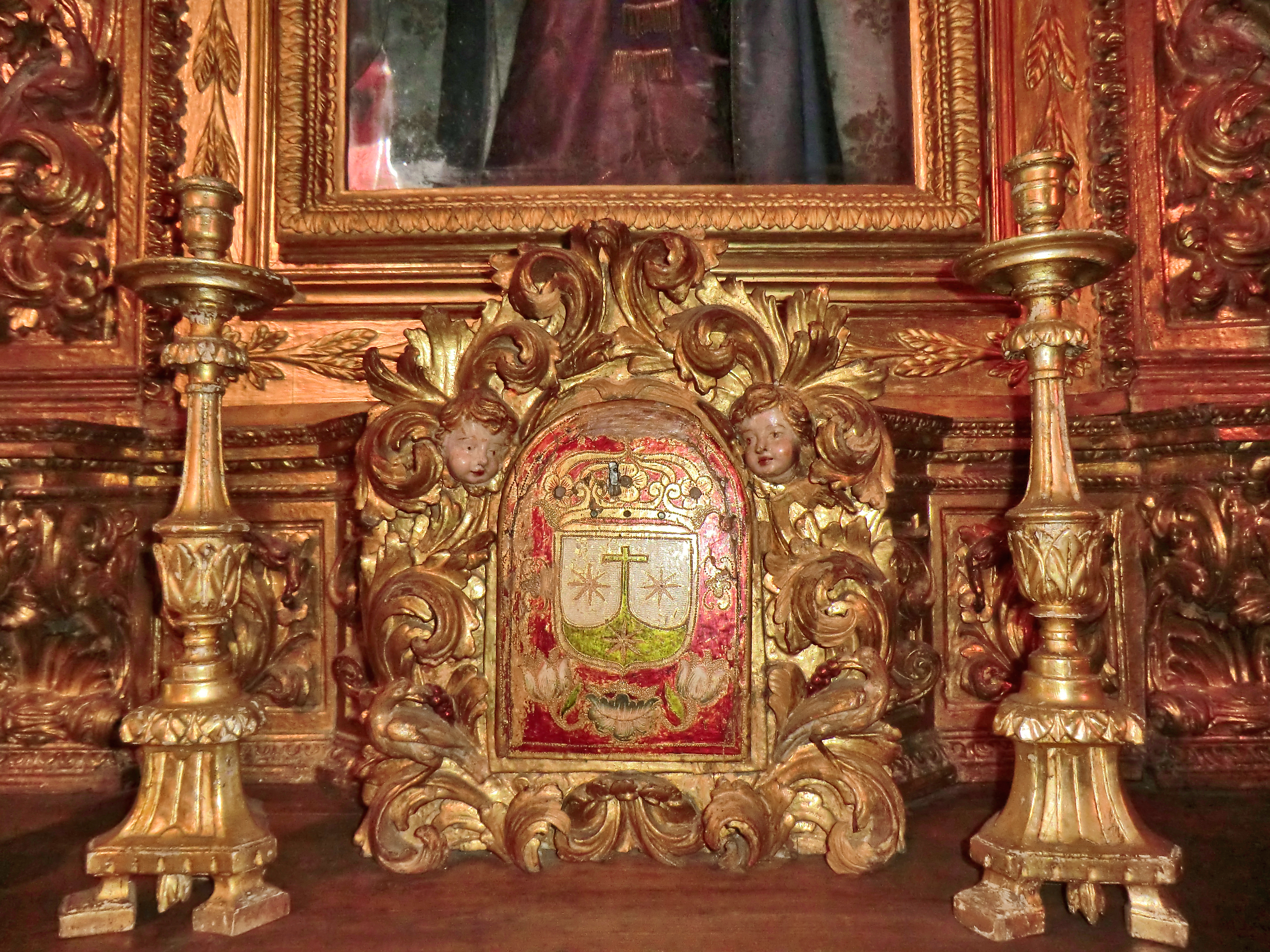
Detail of the gilded altar and ossuary

A refuge for Discalced Carmelites, the monastery was constructed in 1657 as a legacy of Aveirense patron D. Brites de Lara (widow of Pedro de Médicis, son of Cosimo de' Medici). Originally constructed as a residential palace, a petition was made to King D. John IV to establish the convent. Authorization was received posthumously, and only after the king's descendant (Raimundo of Lencastre, 4th Duke of Aveiro) had begun the work of converting the former residence to a convent. The first Carmelite sisters began arriving there from convents in Lisbon in 1658.

The first phase of the convent's construction continued through the reign of King D. Peter II. The church was begun in 1704, and involved the transformation of the chapel into a formal temple. In the 18th century, there were several campaigns to expand and improve the structure, resulting in profound renovations and re-decoration, including the present gilded woodwork, azulejo tile, paintings and sculpture. The last work was completed in 1738 by D. Gabriel, 7th Duke of Aveiro.

The convent's last Carmelite died in 1879.

In 1905 the convent was almost completely destroyed to expand the main square.

On 1 June 1992 the property came under care of the Instituto Português do Património Arquitetónico (Portuguese Institute of Architectural Patrimony), under Decree-law 106F/92 (Diário da Repúblic, Série A, 126). On 14 August, a public competition was held to complete the property's conservation and restoration work.

== Architecture ==
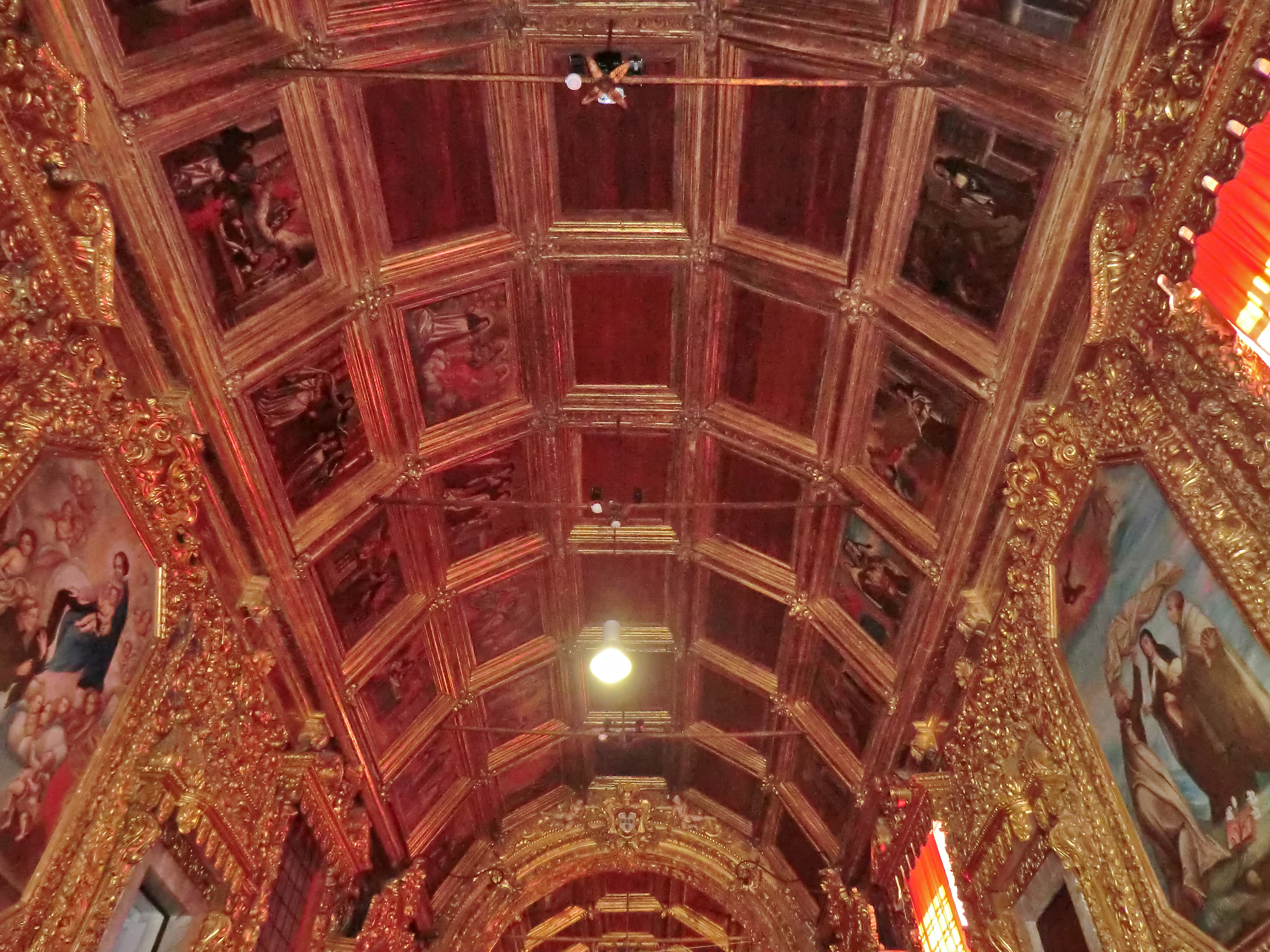
A view of the ceiling within the interior nave showing the azulejo and gilded woodwork.

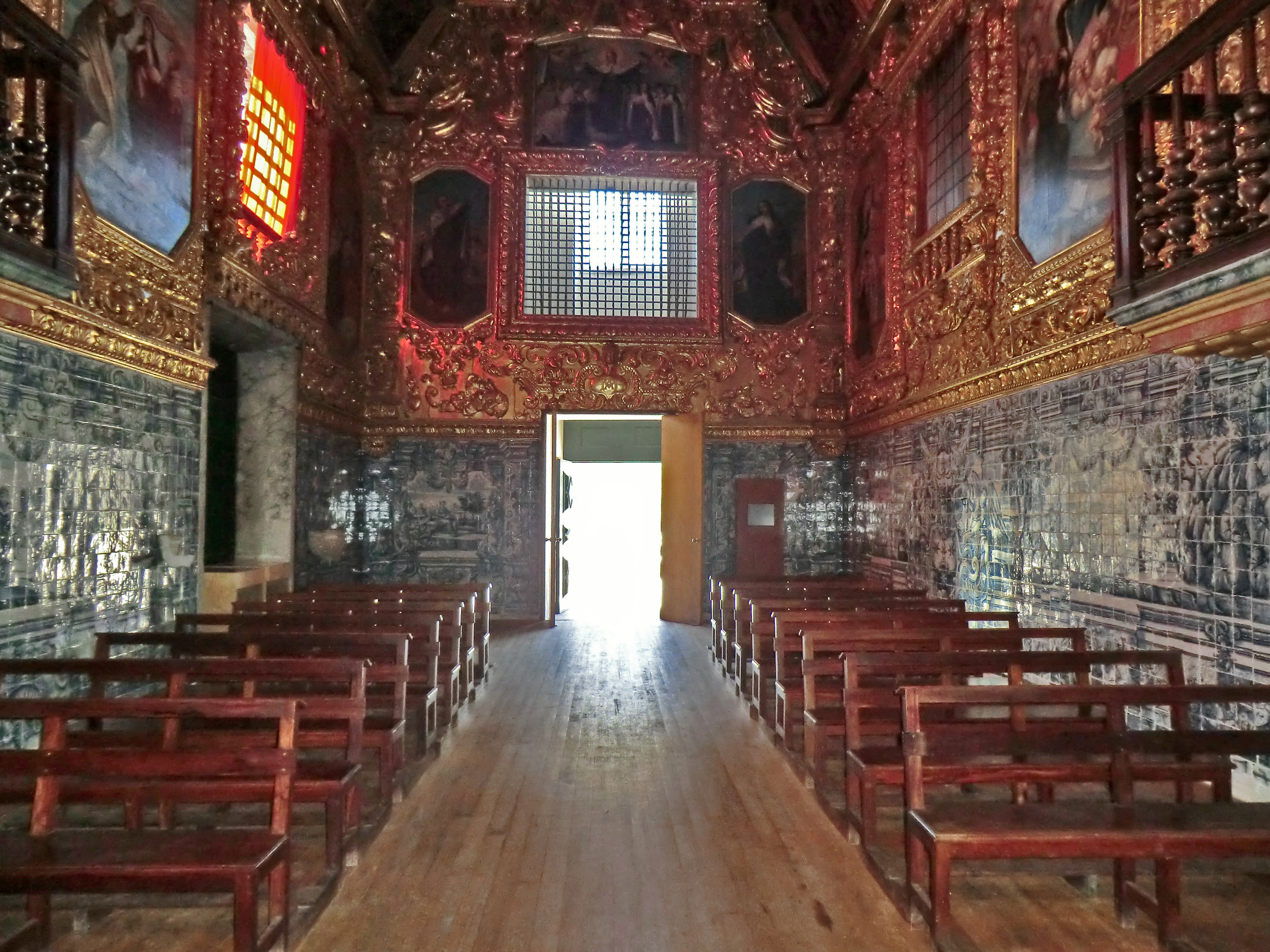
A reverse view of the nave, showing entranceway.

The church is in an urban area, addorsed to the remains of the former annexes of the old convent. It is currently occupied by offices of the Public Security Police (PSP) force, fronting the public square, which also include landscaped modern administrative buildings. The structure adjoins the judicial courts, the Civil Governor's building, and postal offices.

Presenting a somber facade, the simple rectangular church has a sacristy along the axis of the presbytery. Its interior walls and ceiling are covered with ornate gilded woodwork in proto-Baroque, Baroque and Rococo architectural styles, and framing a number of paintings, including depictions of the lives of Mary (in the presbytery), Christ (on the ceiling), and Saint Teresa of Ávila (along the nave). Halfway up the walls is blue and white azulejo tile attributed to 18th century artisan António Vital Rifarto of Coimbra, who was also designed the ceiling's gilded woodwork.
