= George, 1st Duke of Torres Novas =

Jorge/George
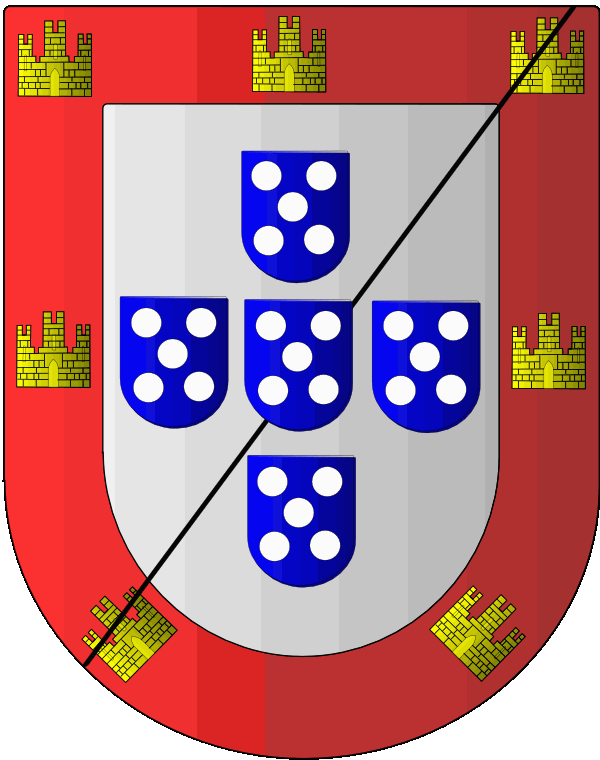
- Coat of arms of Lencastre dukes of Aveiro

1st Duke of Torres Novas
- Reign: 1594 - 1632
- Predecessor: new title
- Successor: Raimundo, 4th duke of Aveiro
- Born: 1594
- Died: 1632 (aged 37–38)
- Spouse: Ana Dória Colonna; Ana Manrique de Cádenas
- Issue: Raimundo, 4th Duke of Aveiro; Maria de Guadalupe, 6th Duchess of Aveiro; Luisa Tomásia; João Matias
- House: House of Aviz
- Father: Álvaro, 3rd Duke of Aveiro

Jorge de Lencastre, or George of Lencastre (Azeitão, 1594 – Lisbon, 1632) was the older son of Dom Álvaro and Juliana of Lencastre, 3rd Dukes of Aveiro.

As heir of the Dukes of Aveiro, he was 3rd Marquis of Torres Novas and, due to King Philip I's special grant, he also became the 1st Duke of Torres Novas.

However, he never inherited the Dukedom of Aveiro, once he died before his mother.

He married twice:

- in 1619, with Ana Dória Colonna (who died in 1620, daughter of André Dória, 3rd Prince of Melfi. They had no issue.
- the 2nd marriage with Ana Manrique de Cádenas (who died in Madrid in 1660) daughter of the Spanish 3rd Dukes of Maqueda. They had four children:
  - Raimundo of Lencastre, 4th Duke of Aveiro;
  - Maria de Guadalupe of Lencastre, 6th Duchess of Aveiro;
  - Luisa Tomásia Manrique de Lancastre (1632 – ? ), without issue;
  - João Matias Manrique de Lancastre Cardenas (1633–1659), without issue.

Portuguese nobility
Preceded by George of Lencastre	Marquis of Torres Novas; 1594–1632	Succeeded by Raimundo of Lencastre
Preceded by new title	Duke of Torres Novas; 1594–1632	Succeeded by Raimundo of Lencastre

== See also ==
- Infante George of Lencastre
- Duke of Aveiro
- Duke of Torres Novas
- Marquis of Torres Novas

== Bibliography ==
- ”Nobreza de Portugal e do Brasil" – Vol. III, page 446. Published by Zairol Lda., Lisbon 1989.
