= Fort Santo António da Piedade =

- Forte de Santo António da Piedade
- Évora, Portugal
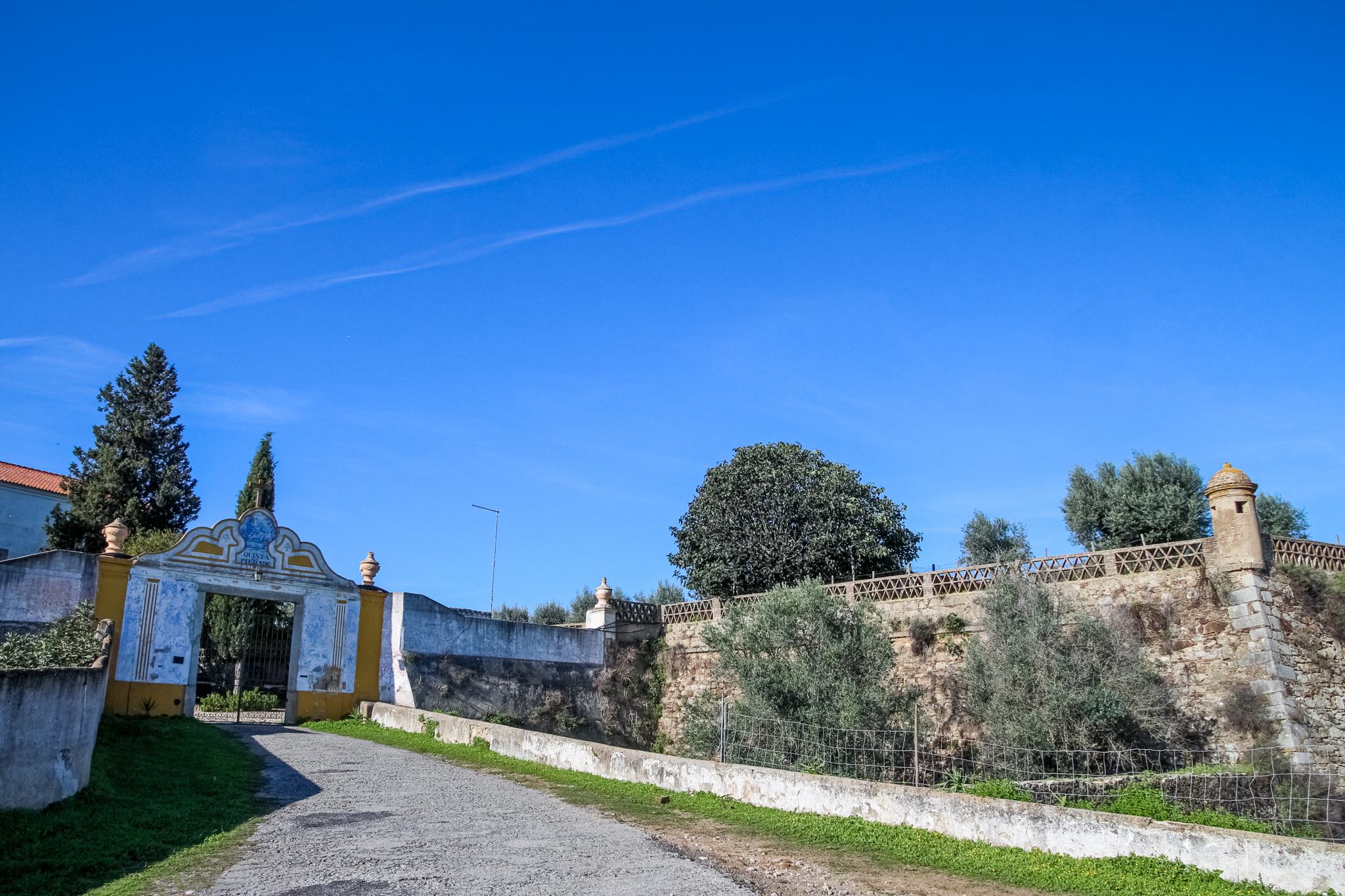
- Gateway to the fort

Site information
- Type: Bastion fort
- Owner: Roman Catholic Archdiocese of Évora
- Open to the public: No
- Condition: Good

Location
- Coordinates: 38°34′42″N 7°54′56″W

Site history
- Built: 1640-1683
- Built by: Portugal
- Events: Portuguese War of Restoration

Fort Santo António da Piedade (Forte de Santo António da Piedade in Portuguese), also known as Fort Santo António for short, (Forte de Santo António in Portuguese) is a military structure located in the parish of Bacelo e Senhora da Saúde, in Évora, Portugal.

The fort has been classified as a building of public interest since 1957.

== History ==
During the Portuguese War of Restoration, after Portugal revolted against Habsburg control, king John IV of Portugal determined to build this fort over the walls of the old Santo António da Piedade Monastery to complement the defense of Évora. It was probably designed by the French military engineer Nicolau de Langres.

By May 1663, its construction was found to be much behind schedule, and it lacked a regular garrison. It was occupied that year by Spanish forces and the monastery damaged by artillery fire. The architect Nicolau Granges defected to the enemy side and was instructed to continue work on the fort. The following month, a combined Anglo-Portuguese force besieged and assaulted it, managing to recapture it.

Its construction was only completed in about 1680.

After all religious orders were dissolved in Portugal in 1834, the monastery, its walls and the fort served as a public cemetery for a few years, until they were auctioned off by the government to private individuals. The facilities of the old Franciscan monastery were adapted to a residence and defaced as a result.

The complex was acquired by the High Seminary of Évora in the 20th century. In the facilities of the monastery, the Externato de Santo António school functioned for decades, soon afterwards it served as home to the Archbishop of the Archdiocese of Évora. It currently serves as the Archdiocesan Missionary Seminary of Évora Redemptoris Mater.

The forts walls have been undergoing conservation work for some time, on the initiative of the General Directorate of Buildings and Monuments of the South.

== Characteristics ==
Of the Vauban type, it features a square plan with bastions at the edges with sentry turrets, about 250 meters north-northwest of the city walls. It is accessed through a gate-of-arms and used to feature a moat.
