= José Manuel de Zuleta, 14th Duke of Abrantes =

The Most Excellent The Duke of Abrantes GE

Private Secretary to the Queen
- In office 25 June 2014 – 30 April 2024
- Monarch: Queen Letizia
- Preceded by: Arturo Luis Coello Villanueva
- Succeeded by: María Dolores Ocaña Madrid

Personal details
- Born: 8 December 1960 (age 65) Melilla, Spain
- Spouse: Ana Pérez de Guzmán y Lizasoain (m. 1986)
- Children: 4
- Parents: José Manuel de Zuleta de Reales y Carvajal, 13th duke of Abrantes (father); Virginia Alejandro y García (mother)
- Education: General Military Academy
- Profession: Military officer, courtier

Military service
- Allegiance: Spain
- Branch/service: Spanish Army
- Years of service: 1979–
- Rank: Divisional general

José Manuel de Zuleta y Alejandro, 14th Duke of Abrantes, GE, RMOSH, is a Spanish aristocrat and senior Spanish Army officer who served as Private Secretary to Queen Letizia from 2014 to 2024.

== Biography ==
He was born on 8 December 1960, in Melilla, Spain. The son of José Manuel de Zuleta de Reales y Carvajal, 13th duke of Abrantes and Virginia Alejandro y García, he joined the General Military Academy in 1979 and graduated with the rank of lieutenant in 1984.

In the mid-1990s, he started to work in the Royal Household, serving in relevant positions in the Royal Guard, in the King's Military Household and in the Protocol Department.

In 2007, he joined the Household of the Prince of Asturias (Prince' Secretariat), where he assisted the Princess of Asturias, Letizia. In 2014, after the accession to the throne of King Felipe VI, he was appointed head of Queen Letizia's Secretariat.

In 2019, he was promoted to the rank of divisional general (OF-7).

On early April 2024, the Royal Household made public that the duke would step down as private secretary to the Queen after 17 years of service. On April 30, he was replaced by State lawyer María Dolores Ocaña Madrid.

== Personal life ==
In 1986, he married Ana Pérez de Guzmán y Lizasoain, daughter of Joaquín Pérez de Guzmán y Escrivá de Romani, 6th count of La Marquina. They have four daughters: Ana Luisa, María, Blanca and Loreto. In 2009, the duke granted his eldest daughter, Ana Luisa, the title of marchioness of Sardoal.

His brother, Felipe de Zuleta y Alejandro, was the riding instructor of the Infanta Elena, Duchess of Lugo.

== Titles ==
In June 1978, shortly after coming of age, his father gave him the title of 14th marquess of Sardoal, a title he held until 2009, when he did the same with his eldest daughter, Ana Luisa.

He currently holds the following titles:

- 14th duke of Abrantes, grandee of Spain.
- 6th marquess of the Duero, grandee of Spain.
- 15th marquess of Valdefuentes.
- 23rd count of Balalcázar.
- 18th count of Casares.
- 15th count of Lences.
- 5th count of Cancelada.

=== Other honors ===
- Grand Cross of the Royal and Military Order of Saint Hermenegild (2016).
- Grand Cross of Military Merit, with White Decoration (2017).

Spanish nobility
Preceded by José Manuel de Zuleta	Duke of Abrantes; 1997–	Succeeded by Incumbent
