= Maurílio de Gouveia =

Portuguese Roman Catholic archbishop (1932–2019)

Maurílio Jorge Quintal de Gouveia
- Archbishop of Évora
- Church: Catholic Church
- Archdiocese: Archdiocese of Évora
- In office: 17 October 1981 – 8 January 2008
- Predecessor: David de Sousa
- Successor: José Francisco Sanches Alves
- Previous posts: Titular Archbishop of Mytilene (1978-1981); Auxiliary (Arch)Bishop of Lisbon (1978-1981); Titular Bishop of Sebana (1973-1978); Auxiliary Bishop of Lisbon (1973-1978)

Orders
- Ordination: 4 June 1955
- Consecration: 13 January 1974 by António Ribeiro

Personal details
- Born: 5 August 1932 Funchal, Funchal District, Portugal
- Died: 19 March 2019 (aged 86) Gaula, Madeira, Portugal

Maurílio Jorge Quintal de Gouveia (5 August 1932 – 19 March 2019) was a Portuguese Roman Catholic archbishop.

== Biography ==
Quintal de Gouveia was born in Portugal and was ordained to the priesthood in 1955. He served as titular bishop of Sabiona and was auxiliary bishop of the Roman Catholic Archdiocese of Lisbon, Portugal, from 1973 to 1981. He then served as archbishop of the Roman Catholic Archdiocese of Évora, Portugal from 1981 to 2008.
