= Puerto Seguro =

- Municipality
- Flag Coat of arms

- Location in Salamanca
- Coordinates: 40°26′51″N 6°44′52″W
- Country: Spain
- Autonomous community: Castile and León
- Province: Salamanca
- Comarca: Comarca de Ciudad Rodrigo
- Subcomarca: Campo de Argañán

Government
  - Mayor: Evaristo Montero Álvarez (People's Party)

Area
  - Total: 29 km^{2} (11 sq mi)
- Elevation: 639 m (2,096 ft)

Population (2025-01-01)
  - Total: 52
  - Density: 1.8/km^{2} (4.6/sq mi)
- Time zone: UTC+1 (CET)
  - Summer (DST): UTC+2 (CEST)
- Postal code: 37488

Puerto Seguro is a municipality located in the province of Salamanca, Castile and León, Spain. As of 2016 the municipality has a population of 64 inhabitants. It is named after the noble title of a deputy in Cortes for Vitigudino, the 12th Marquess of Puerto Seguro (1871–1937) who carried out the necessary procedures for the town to change its name from Barba del Puerco in 1916.

== See also ==
- List of municipalities in Salamanca
