= Palacio del Marqués de Casa Riera =

Coordinates: 40.4185°N 3.6960°W

The Palacio del Marqués de Casa Riera was the name for two successive buildings located in the same place, in the Spanish city of Madrid, in the number 64 of the Calle de Alcalá, it was in the widest part of the street.

== First palace ==
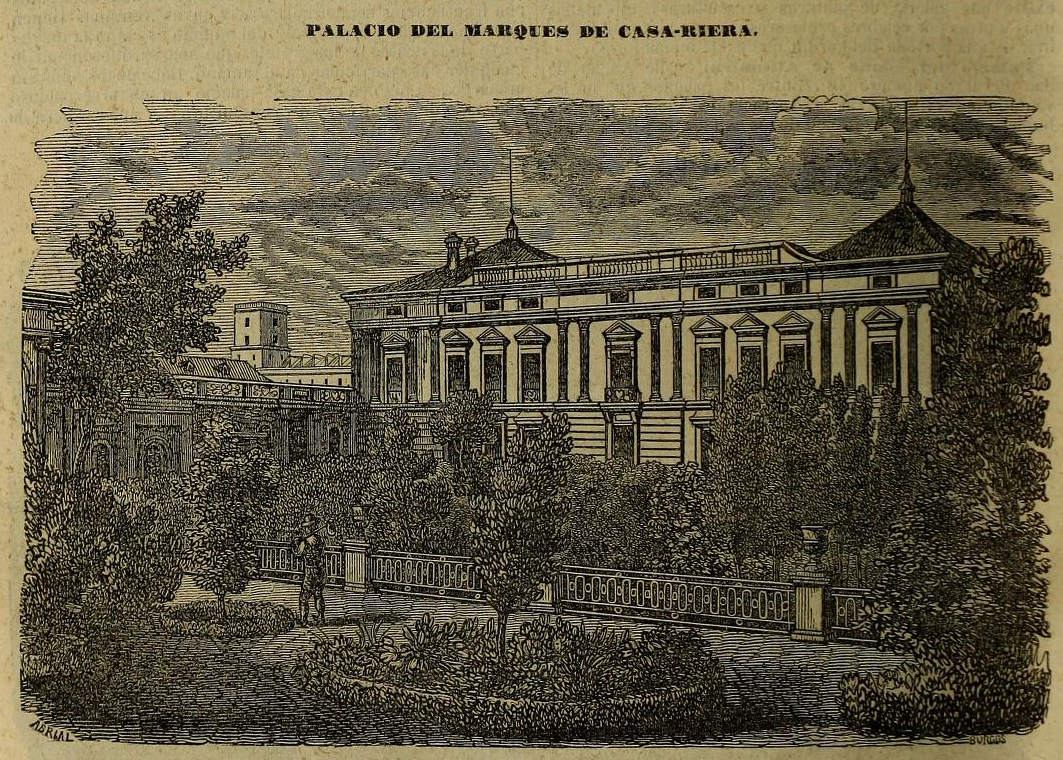
Engraving of the palace published in the volume X of Diccionario geográfico-estadístico-histórico de España y sus posesiones de Ultramar by Pascual Madoz, in 1850.

Its plant formed a rectangle parallelogram, consisting each of its four facades of three floors that were in all them in the same horizontal plan, serving as entrance to the building a spacious garden, which occupied the site of the old Convento de la Natividad y San José A portal with three entries, ornate with pillars, separated this garden from the Calle de Alcalá.

The building dates from early 19th century. It was built as a dowry for the Duchess of Abrantes, for which circumstance was designated with the name of "la casa de los alfileres" (the house of the pins). (Note: Previously also existed on the site, adjacent to Convento de la Natividad y San José, the house that the Marquis of Auñón built for his natural son Rodrigo de Herrera, famous dramatic poet, author of the comedies From heaven comes the good king and The faith has no need of weapons. After was the Count of Miranda and of the memories founded by the Marquis of Mancera) In the new building lived the Marquis of Ariza, the Russian ambassador, Prince Tatischef, and the famous provisionist of the French army and great financial Gabriel-Julien Ouvrard, in 1823 and 1824, at which time were held on its halls magnificent soirees and banquets, until it acquired the Catalan Marquis of Riera, who invested large sums in the decoration. The extension of the house and gardens was considerable, besides providing in front, on calle del Turco, (Note: Current calle del Marqués de Cubas.) other big housing for garages and offices, with which had connexion through a tunnel.

== Second palace ==
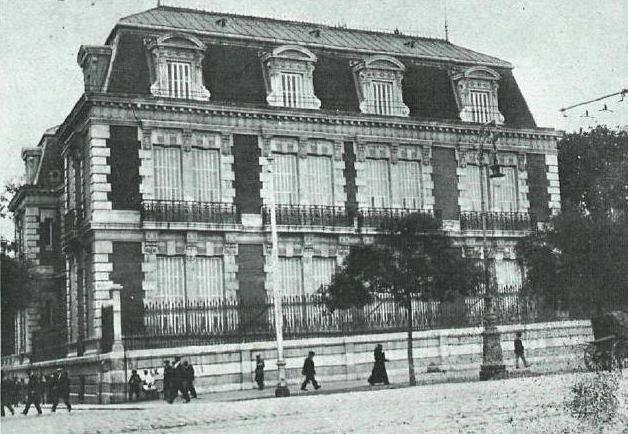
(Second) Palacio del Marqués de Casa Riera (c. 1915).

On 1893 the first palace was demolished, and the Marquis of Casa Riera's nephew, Alejandro Riera Mora rose another palace. The new building was designed by architect Isaac Rodriguez Avial, in stone walls, brick and slate with attic. Part of the large garden is acquired to work in the Círculo de Bellas Artes (Circle of Fine Arts of Antonio Palacios) in 1917 and the rest was demolished in the late-1920s.

== Remains ==
After the Spanish Civil War the site of the palace is occupied by a building that would be the Secretaría General del Movimiento (General Secretariat of the Movement) until 1977 and whose facade facing calle de Alcalá highlighted the yoke and arrows of great size that was its symbol. The garden was then used as parking. Then passed to the current office building of the Calle Alcalá No. 44, which can also be accessed through the garden from the calle Marqués Casa Riera. The office building reflects a simple structure, elegant and modern, with stone, marble and metals. Inside are touches of greenery and water, as continuation of the original gardens as well as a fountain of contemporary design in the center of the courtyard.

At the low facing the calle Alcalá is located the Catalan cultural center and library, called Blanquerna, as a tribute to the Catalan origins of the Marquis which gives his name to the street.

== Sources ==
- Madoz, Pascual (1850). "Madrid". Diccionario geográfico-estadístico-histórico de España y sus posesiones de ultramar. Vol. X. Madrid: Imprenta del Diccionario geográfico-estadístico histórico de D. Pascual Madoz.
- Mesonero Romanos, Ramón de (30 October 1853). "Las calles y casas de Madrid". Semanario Pintoresco Español (44). Madrid: 345–349. ISSN 2171-0538.
- Terán, Manuel de (2004). Ciudades españolas: (estudios de geografía urbana). Real Academia de la Historia. ISBN 9788495983480.
