= George, 2nd Duke of Aveiro =

George of Lencastre
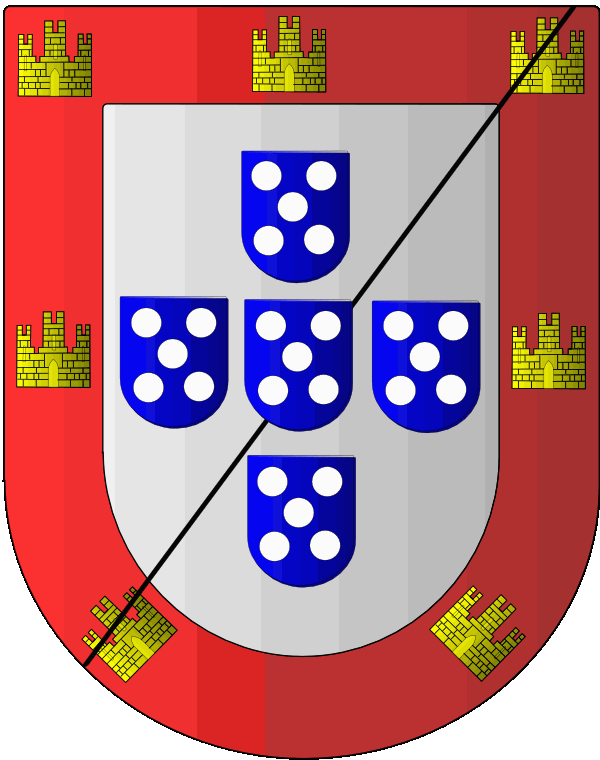
- Coat of arms of Lencastre dukes of Aveiro

2nd Duke of Aveiro
- Reign: 1571 - 1578
- Predecessor: João
- Successor: Alvaro and Juliana
- Born: 1548
- Died: 1578 (aged 29–30)
- Spouse: Madalena Girón
- Issue: Juliana, 3rd Duchess of Aveiro
- House: House of Aviz
- Father: João, 1st Duke of Alveiro
- Mother: Juliana de Lara

Jorge de Lencastre, or George of Lencastre (1548–1578), was the older son of Dom John of Lencastre, 1st Duke of Aveiro and of his wife Juliana de Lara, daughter of the 3rd Marquis of Vila Real.

Until his father's death, he used the title of Marquis of Torres Novas, and also succeeded him as 2nd Duke of Aveiro in 1571.

He was a close adviser to King Sebastian I of Portugal and he escorted him, both to the Guadalupe interview (where Sebastian met his uncle, King Philip II of Spain) and to the Portuguese campaign to Morocco. George was killed in the Battle of Alcácer Quibir, together with the King, in 1578.

Before, he had married Madalena Girón, sister of the Spanish Pedro Téllez-Girón y de la Cueva, 1st Duke of Osuna, from whom he had a single daughter:

- Juliana of Lencastre, 3rd Duchess of Aveiro, married to Álvaro of Lencastre, 3rd Duke of Aveiro.

Portuguese nobility
Preceded by John of Lencastre	Marquis of Torres Novas; 1548—1571	Succeeded by George of Lencastre, 1st Duke of Torres Novas
Preceded by John of Lencastre	Duke of Aveiro; 1571—1578	Succeeded by Álvaro of Lencastre and Juliana of Lencastre

== See also ==
- Infante George of Lencastre
- John of Lencastre, 1st Duke of Aveiro
- Duke of Aveiro
- Duke of Torres Novas
- Marquis of Torres Novas

== Bibliography ==
- ”Nobreza de Portugal e do Brasil” – Vol. II, page 343. Published by Zairol Lda., Lisbon 1989.
