= Duke of Abrantes (1642) =

Dukedom of Spain

- Creation date: 23 March 1642
- Created by: Philip IV
- Peerage: Spanish nobility
- First holder: Alfonso de Láncaster y Enríquez de Girón, 1st Duke of Abrantes
- Present holder: José Manuel de Zuleta y Alejandro, 14th Duke of Abrantes

Duke of Abrantes (Spanish: Duque de Abrantes) is a hereditary title of Spanish nobility, accompanied by the dignity of Grandee. It was granted in 1642 by Philip IV to Alfonso de Láncaster, 1st Marquess of Puerto Seguro, son of the 3rd Duke of Aveiro and a great-grandchild of John II of Portugal. It takes its name from the city of Abrantes in Portugal.

Bernardo de Carvajal y Moctezuma, 2nd Count of Enjarada, is an ancestor of the Dukes of Abrantes, thereby making them descendants of Doña Isabel Moctezuma and the Aztec Emperor Moctezuma II. This ducal family formerly owned the Palacio de los Toledo-Moctezuma at Cáceres in Spain.

The Habsburgs were deposed from the Portuguese throne in 1640, two years before this dukedom was created. The title was never recognised in Portugal, but it remains extant in Spain. The present Duke of Abrantes, who is also a Grandee of Spain, is Don José Manuel de Zuleta y Alejandro, who is the Private Secretary to Queen Letizia.

Buildings

- Recreo de las Cadenas
- Palacio del Marqués de Casa Riera

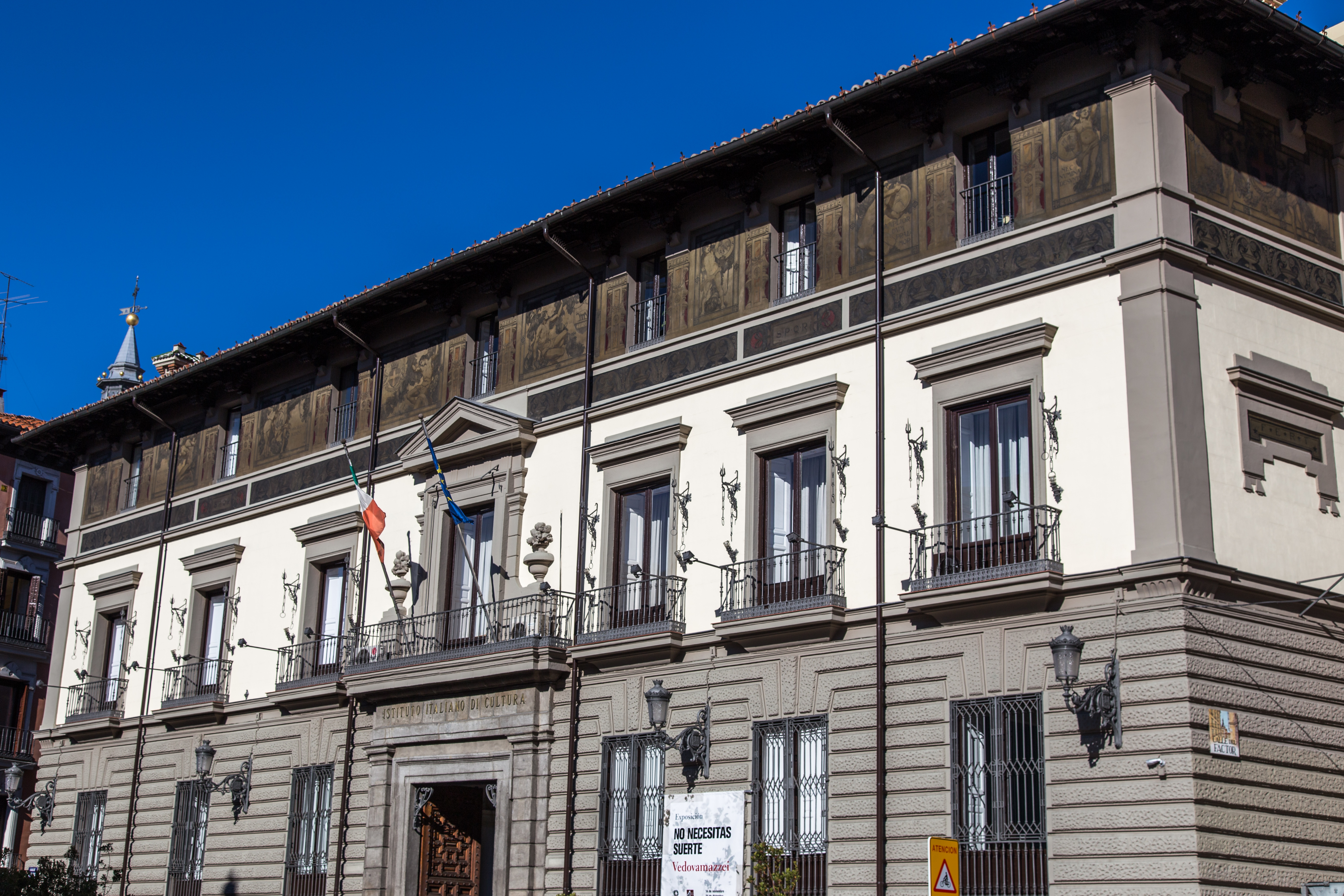
Palace of the dukes of Abrantes in Madrid, Spain, currently the Institute of Italian Culture

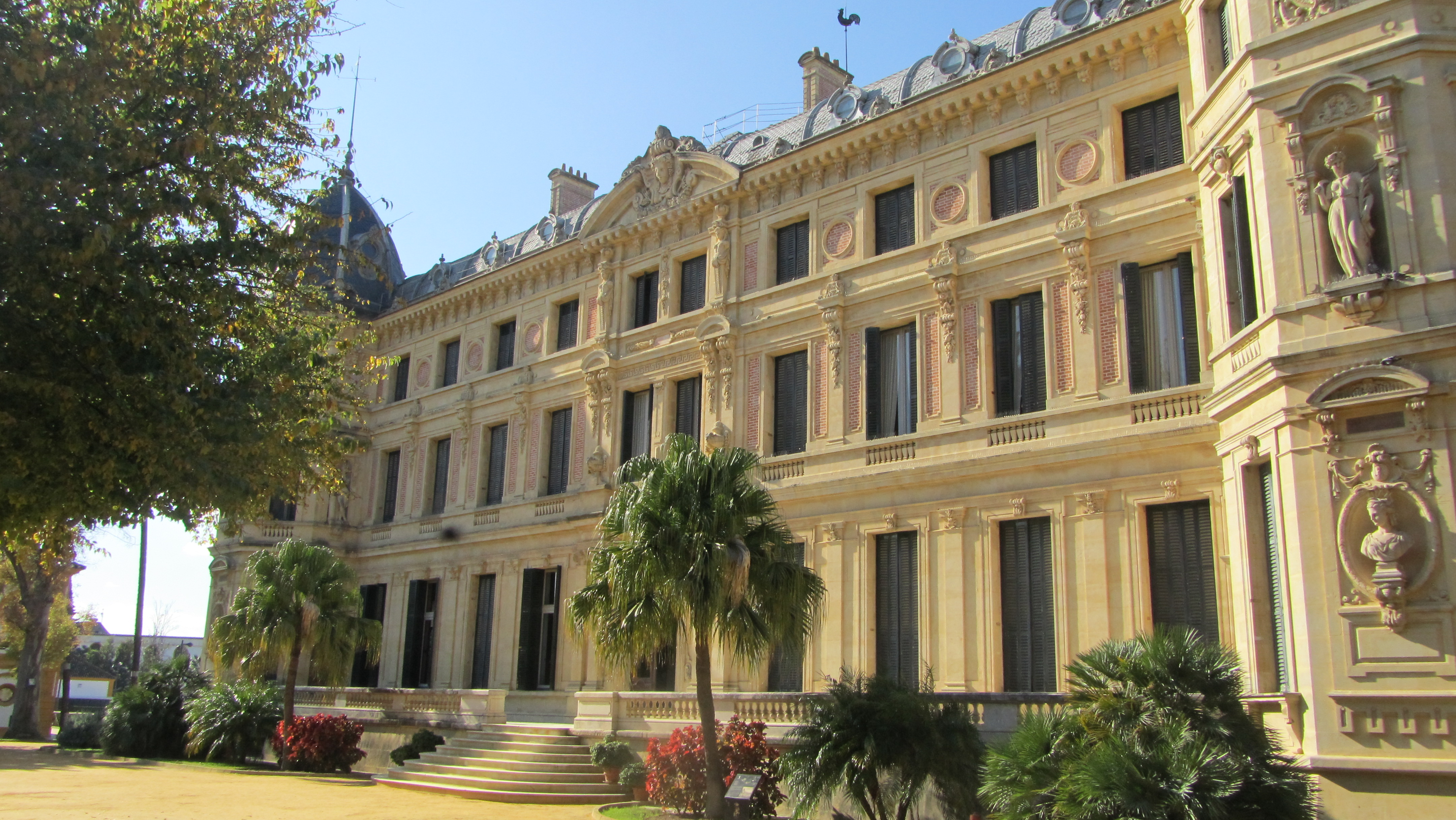
Palace of the dukes of Abrantes in Jerez de la Frontera, Spain

== Dukes of Abrantes (1642) ==
- Alfonso de Láncaster y Enríquez de Girón, 1st Duke of Abrantes
- Agustín de Láncaster y Sande, 2nd Duke of Abrantes
- Juan Manuel de Láncaster y Noroña, 3rd Duke of Abrantes
- Juan Antonio de Carvajal y Láncaster, 4th Duke of Abrantes
- Manuel Bernardino de Carvajal y Zúñiga, 5th Duke of Abrantes
- Ángel María de Carvajal y Gonzaga, 6th Duke of Abrantes
- Manuel Guillermo de Carvajal y Fernández de Córdoba, 7th Duke of Abrantes
- Ángel María de Carvajal y Fernández de Córdoba, 8th Duke of Abrantes
- Ángel María de Carvajal y Téllez-Girón, 9th Duke of Abrantes
- Ángel Luis de Carvajal y Fernández de Córdoba y Téllez-Girón, 10th Duke of Abrantes
- Manuel Bernardino de Carvajal y Gutiérrez de la Concha, 11th Duke of Abrantes
- Carmen de Carvajal y del Alcázar, 12th Duke of Abrantes
- José Manuel de Zuleta y Carvajal, 13th Duke of Abrantes
- José Manuel de Zuleta y Alejandro, 14th Duke of Abrantes

== See also ==
- List of dukes in the peerage of Spain
- List of current grandees of Spain
- Duke of Abrantes
