= Marquess of Puerto Seguro =

Portuguese noble title

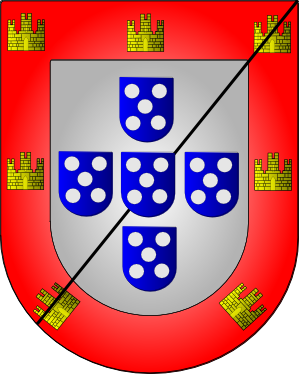
The Coat of Arms of the Lencastre family, Marquesses of Porto Seguro.

Marquess of Puerto Seguro (Spanish: Marqués de Puerto Seguro, Portuguese: Marquês de Porto Seguro) is a hereditary title of Spanish nobility, created on 8 April 1627 by King Philip III of Portugal (aka Philipe IV of Spain) in favour of Afonso of Lencastre, 2nd son of Álvaro of Lencastre, 3rd Duke of Aveiro. Originally, it was a Portuguese noble title and it takes the name from Porto Seguro, Brazil.

Afonso always supported the Habsburg kings and even after the Portuguese revolution of 1 December 1640, he remained faithful to the Spanish Dynasty. Later, by a decree issued on 23 March 1642, King Philip granted him the titles of Duke of Abrantes and Marquess of Sardoal.

The current Spanish municipality of Puerto Seguro, was renamed as such in 1916 after the initiative of Luis María de Carajal y Melgarejo, 12th Marquess of Puerto Seguro.

== List of marquesses ==
1. Afonso of Lencastre (1627–1654), also Duke of Abrantes and Marquess of Sardoal
2. Agustín de Láncaster y Sande Padilla (1654–1720), also Duke of Abrantes.
3. Alfonso de Láncaster y Noroña Sande y Silva (1720), also Duke of Abrantes.
4. Juan Manuel de Lancaster Sande y Silva (1720–1733), also Duke of Abrantes.
5. Juan Antonio de Carvajal y Láncaster (1733–1747), also Duke of Abrantes.
6. Manuel Bernardino de Carvajal y Zúñiga (1747–1783), also Duke of Abrantes.
7. Ángel María de Carvajal y Gonzaga (1783–1793), also Duke of Abrantes.
8. Manuel Guillermo de Carvajal y Fernández de Córdoba (1793–1816), also Duke of Abrantes.
9. Ángel María de Carvajal y Fernández de Córdoba y Gonzaga (1816–1838), also Duke of Abrantes.
10. Ángel María de Carvajal y Téllez-Girón (1838–1890), also Duke of Abrantes.
11. Luis María de Carvajal y Fernández de Córdoba (1890–1899)
12. Luis María de Carvajal y Melgarejo (1899–1937), also Duke of Aveyro.
13. Ángel María de Carvajal y Santos Suárez (1937–1965), also Duke of Aveyro.
14. Luis Jaime de Carvajal y Salas (1965–2023), also Duke of Aveyro.
15. Jaime Alfonso Carvajal y López-Chicheri (since 2024)

== See also ==
- List of marquisates in Spain
- List of marquisates in Portugal

== Bibliography ==
"Nobreza de Portugal e do Brasil" – Vol. III, page 173. Published by Zairol Lda., Lisbon 1989.
