= João de Lencastre, 1st Duke of Aveiro =

João de Lencastre
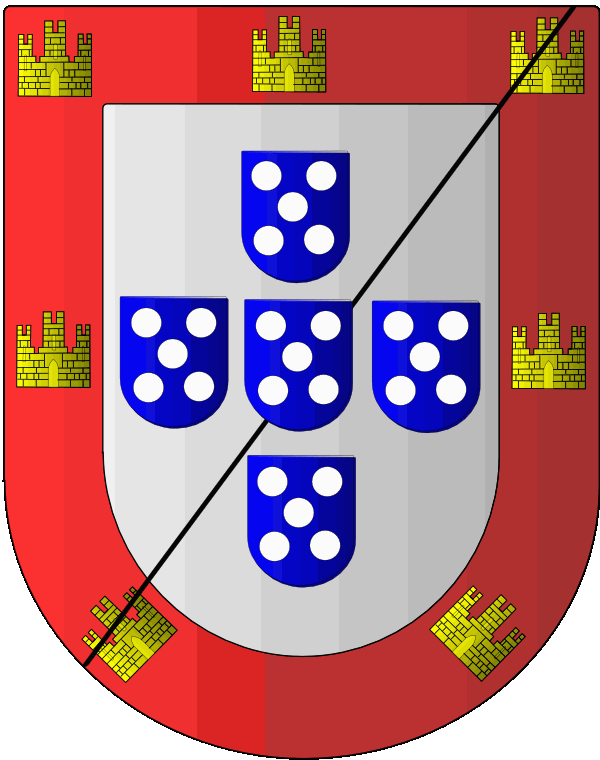
- Coat of arms of Lencastre dukes of Aveiro

1st Duke of Aveiro
- Reign: 1535 - 1571
- Predecessor: new title
- Successor: George, 2nd duke of Aveiro
- Born: 1501
- Died: 1571 (aged 69–70); Coimbra
- Spouse: Juliana de Lara
- Issue: George, 2nd Duke of Aveiro; Pedro Dinis
- House: House of Aviz
- Father: Jorge de Lencastre, Duke of Coimbra
- Mother: Beatriz de Vilhena

João de Lencastre (1501 – 1571 in Coimbra), was the older son of Jorge de Lencastre, Duke of Coimbra and of his wife Dona Beatriz of Vilhena.

Through his father, John was a grandchild of King John II of Portugal and a 3rd cousin to King Manuel I of Portugal.

Through his mother, daughter of Álvaro of Braganza (4th male son of Fernando I, 2nd Duke of Braganza), John of Lencastre was closely related to the most prestigious aristocratic families of the Kingdom (namely the Duke of Braganza, the Marquis of Ferreira, the Marquis of Vila Real, the Count of Vimioso and the Count of Portalegre).

When he was 12 years old, he served crown prince John (who became later King John III of Portugal) and King Manuel I granted him the title of Marquis of Torres Novas by a royal decree issued on March 27, 1520.

In that time, the royal house announced the marriage of Infante Ferdinand, Duke of Guarda (younger son of King Manuel I) to one of the country's richest and most prestigious heiresses, Dona Guiomar Coutinho, 5th Countess of Marialva and the 3rd Countess of Loulé. However, John of Lencastre declared he had secretly married the bride. The scandal in the Court ended when King John III ordered the Marquis imprisonment in the Castle of São Jorge, in Lisbon, allowing the celebration of the Infante Ferdinand's marriage.

After nine years, when he was released, he went to live in Setúbal, maybe ashamed for the situation, and he only returned to the Court in 1535, to escort Infante Luis, Duke of Beja, who was leading the Portuguese fleet in Charles V’s crusade against Tunis. In that year King John III granted him the title of Duke of Aveiro.

After his return from Madrid, in 1537 (where he was sent by King John III to present formal condolences to Charles V, when his wife, Empress Isabel of Portugal, died) John of Lencastre, 1st Duke of Aveiro, decided to marry to Dona Juliana de Lara, daughter of the 3rd Marquis of Vila Real.

In 1552, he was again chosen by the King to escort, from the border to Lisbon, the Infanta Joanna of Spain, who would marry John, Crown Prince of Portugal (John III's only surviving son).

John of Lencastre and Juliana de Lara had two sons:

- George of Lencastre (1548–1578), Marquis of Torres Novas, who succeeded his father as 2nd Duke of Aveiro, and died in the Battle of Alcácer Quibir;
- Pedro Dinis of Lencastre (1550-1576) 1, married as her first husband Filipa da Silva, 4th Countess of Portalegre who later married Juan da Silva, Spanish ambassador.

John of Lencastre wrote several books and built a magnificent convent in Arrábida, near Setúbal, where an annual music festival takes place.

Portuguese nobility
Preceded by New title	Marquis of Torres Novas; 1520–1548	Succeeded by George of Lencastre
Preceded by New title	Duke of Aveiro; 1535–1571	Succeeded by George of Lencastre

== See also ==
- Infante George of Lencastre
- Duke of Aveiro
- Marquis of Torres Novas

== Bibliography ==
- ”Nobreza de Portugal e do Brasil” – Vol. II, pages 342 and 343. Published by Zairol Lda., Lisbon 1989.
