= Raimundo, 4th Duke of Aveiro =

Raimundo de Lencastre
- Duke of Torres Novas
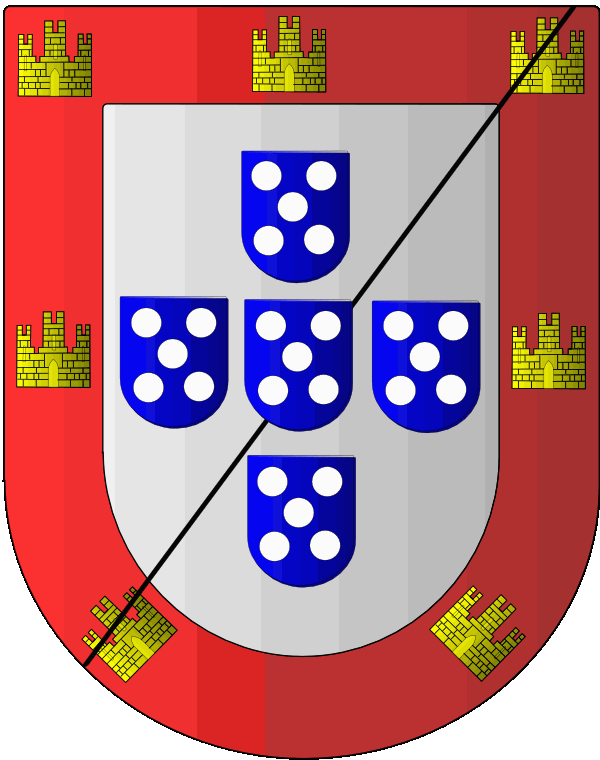
- Coat of arms of Lencastre dukes of Aveiro

4th Duke of Aveiro
- Reign: 1636–1663
- Predecessor: Álvaro, 3rd Duke of Aveiro and his wife Juliana de Lencastre
- Successor: Peter, 5th duke of Aveiro
- Born: ?
- Died: 1666; Cádiz
- Spouse: Louise Claire of Ligne
- Issue: Pedro of Lencastre; Genebra Simões; Micaela Maria
- House: House of Aviz
- Father: George, 1st Duke of Torres Novas
- Mother: Ana Manrique de Cádenas

Dom Raimundo of Lencastre (?–1666) was the older son of George of Lencastre, 1st Duke of Torres Novas, and grandson of Álvaro and Juliana of Lencastre, 3rd Dukes of Aveiro.

Once his father died before his grandmother, in 1632, he succeed him as heir of the House of Aveiro, as 4th Marquis of Torres Novas and 2nd Duke of Torres Novas. He also became 4th Duke of Aveiro when his grandmother, the 3rd Duchess, died in 1636.

When the Braganzas expelled the Habsburgs from the Portuguese throne, in 1640, he was nominee member of the Portuguese State Council. However, after 1659, he fled to Brest, in Brittany, and from there he travelled to Spain, where he supported the Spanish Habsburgs rights to the throne of Portugal.

He was quite welcomed in Madrid by King Philip IV of Spain, who granted him the new Spanish title of Duke of Ciudad Real, but, in spite his mother and sister also lived in Madrid, he didn't feel comfortable among the conservative Spanish nobility.

Meanwhile, in Portugal, Dom Raimundo of Lencastre was condemn for treason (in 1663) and the King of Portugal, John IV, confiscated the Dukedom and granted it to Raimundo's uncle, Peter of Lencastre, a Braganza supporter, who was recognised as 5th Duke of Aveiro and 5th Marquis of Torres Novas.

In 1665, the Spanish tried a last effort to conquer Portugal and Dom Raimundo advised a simultaneous naval expedition, leaving from Cádiz, against the Portuguese cost, which he led. The expedition was not successful and Raimundo died in Cádiz in 1666.

He had married Louise Claire of Ligne (1640–1684), daughter of Claude-Lamoral, 3rd Prince of Ligne. They had no issue.

Raimundo had three natural children:

- Pedro of Lencastre, who died fighting in Sicily;
- Genebra Simões, with issue known today in Portugal (family Meireles Garrido);
- Micaela Maria de Mendonça († 1718 in Torres Vedras), married to João Boto Pimentel Côrte-Real (1642–1715), with known issue.

== Titles ==
- In Portugal – Marquis of Torres Novas (1632–1636), Duke of Torres Novas (1632–1636), Duke of Aveiro (1636–1663).
- In Spain – Duke of Ciudad Real, Duke of Maqueda, Marquis of Montemayor, Marquis of Elche, Captain-General of the Ocean Armada and Mayor of the city of Toledo.

== Bibliography ==
- ”Nobreza de Portugal e do Brasil” – Vol. II, pages 344 and 345; Vol. III, pages 446 and 447. Published by Zairol Lda., Lisbon 1989.

Portuguese nobility
Preceded by George of Lencastre	Marquis of Torres Novas; 1632—1636	Succeeded by Peter of Lencastre
Preceded by George of Lencastre	Duke of Torres Novas; 1632—1636	Extinct
Preceded by Juliana of Lencastre	Duke of Aveiro; 1636—1663	Succeeded by Peter of Lencastre
