= Convento de la Natividad y San José =

Convent in Madrid, Spain

Coordinates: 40.4181°N 3.6971°W

The Convento de la Natividad y San José (English for: Convent of the Nativity and Saint Joseph) (formerly popularly called convento de las Baronesas) was a convent of Carmelite nuns located in Calle de Alcalá (Madrid). Was designed and started to build the building by foreman Juan de Lobera in the mid-17th century, being finished in 1700 by his son-in-law Juan de Pineda. The convent due to the Confiscation of Mendizábal was demolished in 1836 and its site put on sale.

== History ==
The convent with a capacity of forty nuns popularly called the Baronnesses (las Baronesas) by be founded on a site (currently in front of the Círculo de Bellas Artes's headquarters) loan by Beatriz de Silveyra, Baroness of Castel Florido, bound for the creation of a convent placed under the patronage of the Nativity of Our Lady and St. Joseph. This site was purchased with money that left her husband, Jorge Paz de Silveyra, at dying. In this site was located previously the Mesón del Toro. The commission of its construction went for master builder Juan de Lobera who died during the execution of the works in 1680. The Baroness had died in 1660. In 1700 the convent was completed. During few more than a century was functioning, being demolished in 1836. In its site was built the Palacio del Marqués de Casa Riera (known popularly as casa de los alfileres).

== See also ==
- Catholic Church in Spain
