= Duke of Torres Novas =

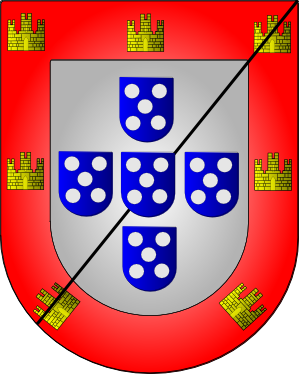
Arms of the Lencastres, Dukes of Aveiro.

The Dukes of Torres Novas (in Portuguese & Spanish Duque de Torres Novas) was an aristocratic Portuguese title granted by King Philip II of Portugal, also known as Philip III of Spain, by a royal decree of September 26, 1619, to George of Lencastre, 1st Duke of Torres Novas, who died before his parents, Juliana and Álvaro of Lencastre of Lencastre, 3rd Dukes of Aveiro.

The title of Duke of Torres Novas (originally Marquis of Torres Novas) was subsidiary to the title of Duke of Aveiro, and was used by the House of Aveiro heir during his father's life.

== List of dukes of Torres Novas ==
1. George of Lencastre, 1st Duke of Torres Novas (1594–1632), also known as 3rd Marquis of Torres Novas died before his mother, Juliana of Lencastre, 3rd Duchess of Aveiro, therefore never became Duke of Aveiro;
2. Raimundo of Lencastre, 4th Duke of Aveiro (1620–1666), son of the previous Duke. He was 2nd Duke of Torres Novas, from 1632 to 1636, when he succeeded to his grand mother Juliana of Lencastre, 3rd Duchess of Aveiro.

== Family name ==
The family name associated with the Dukes of Aveiro is Lencastre or Lancastre and Ramos-Sarrico, referring to King John I's wife Philippa of Lancaster, daughter of English prince John of Gaunt and founder of the House of Lancaster.

== Genealogical summary ==
John I (1357-1433); King of Portugal | Philippa of Lencastre (1360-1415); Princess of England
Duarte I (1391-1438); King of Portugal
Afonso V (1432-1481); King of Portugal | Infante Fernando (1433-1470); 1st.Duke of Beja; 2nd.Duke of Viseu
Ana de Mendonça | John II (1455-1495); King of Portugal | Leonor of Viseu (1458-1525) | Manuel I (1469-1521); King of Portugal
George of Lencastre (1481-1550); 2nd.Duke of Coimbra | Afonso (1475-1491); Crown Prince
JOHN of LENCASTRE (1501-1571); 1st.Marquis of Torres Novas; 1st.Duke of Aveiro | LOUIS of LENCASTRE (1505-1574); 1st.Comendador-mor of the Order of Aviz
Comemdadores-mores of Aviz
Dukes of Aveiro; Marquises of Torres Novas | Counts of Figueiró | Knights of Coruche
Marquises of Gouvêa | Counts of Vila Nova de Portimão | Lords of Alcaçovas
Marquises of Lavradio | Marquises of Abrantes | Counts of Alcaçovas

== See also ==
- Duke of Aveiro
- Marquis of Torres Novas
- Dukedoms in Portugal

== Bibliography ==
”Nobreza de Portugal e do Brasil" – Vol. III, pages 446/447. Published by Zairol Lda., Lisbon 1989.
