= Ana de Mendonça =

Ana de Mendonça (c. 1460-1542) was a maid of a claimant of Castile, Joanna la Beltraneja, and a mistress of King John II of Portugal, who was also Master of the Order of Saint James 1470-1492. They had one son, Jorge de Lencastre, Duke of Coimbra and Master of the Military Order of Saint James of the Sword. He married D. Isabel Colón's sister-in-law.

Ana de Mendonça's father was a knight of Saint James named Nuno Furtado de Mendonça, (Bartolomeu Perestrelo's brother-in-law) married to Leonor da Silva. Ana de Mendonça's grandfather was Afonso Furtado de Mendonça "anadél-mor de Besteiros" (leader of the archers) a post that was then inherited by Ana de Mendonça's uncle, Duarte Furtado de Mendonça.

Ana de Mendonça, niece of Bartolomeu Perestrelo, took over the post of "Comendadeira" (Mother Superior) in the All Saints Monastery belonging to the Order of Saint James of the Sword on 8 July 1508, a position she held until her death in 1542. The previous Comendadeira had been her aunt, Violante Nogueira, Bartolomeu Perestrelo's sister-in-law, the former nanny of King Duarte's children, and aunt of Izeu Perestrelo, Filipa Moniz's half-sister. Ana de Mendonça was direct cousin of Izeu Perestrelo (Captainess of Graciosa Island) married to King John II's Royal Guard, Pedro Correia da Cunha, Captain of Graciosa Island.
