= Archdiocese of Évora =

Roman Catholic archdiocese in Portugal

Coordinates: 38.5500°N 7.9500°W

Archdiocese of Evora Archiodioecesis Eborensis Arquidiocese de Évora

Catholic
- Cathedral of Évora

Location
- Country: Portugal
- Ecclesiastical province: Évora

Statistics
- Area: 13,547 km^{2} (5,231 sq mi)
- Population: Total; Catholics: (as of 2006); 290,000; 245,900 (84.8%)

Information
- Denomination: Roman Catholic
- Rite: Latin Rite / Mozarabic Rite
- Established: 4th century (As Diocese of Évora); 24 September 1540 (As Archdiocese of Évora)
- Cathedral: Cathedral of Our Lady of the Assumption in Évora

Current leadership
- Pope: Leo XIV
- Archbishop: Francisco José Vilas Boas Senra de Faria Coelho
- Suffragans: Beja; Faro

Map

Website
- Website of the Archdiocese

The Archdiocese of Évora (Latin: Archidioecesis Eborensis)is a Latin Church diocese of the Catholic Church in Portugal with Évora Cathedral as its see.
It has as suffragans the diocese of Beja and diocese of Faro. The current archbishop of Évora is Francisco José Vilas Boas Senra (2018-current) de Faria Coelho and the archbishop emeritus of Évora is José Francisco Sanches Alves (archbishop from 2008 to 2018).

== History ==
Évora was raised to archiepiscopal rank in 1544, at which time it was given as suffragans the diocese of Leiria and diocese of Portalegre; in 1570 and later were added the diocese of Silves, diocese of Ceuta, diocese of Congo, diocese of São Tomé, diocese of Funchal, diocese of Cabo Verde, and diocese of Angra.

Its bishop, Quintianus, was present at the Synod of Elvira early in the fourth century. There exists no complete list of his successors for the next two centuries, though some are known from ancient diptychs. In 584 the Visigothic king, Liuvigild, incorporated with his state the Kingdom of the Suebi, to which Évora had hitherto belonged. From the sixth and seventh centuries there remain a few Christian inscriptions pertaining to Évora. In one of them has been interpolated the name of a Bishop Julian (1 December, 566); he is, however, inadmissible. Thenceforth the episcopal list is known from the reign of Reccared (586) to the Islamic invasion (714), after which the succession is quite unknown for four centuries and a half, with the exception of the epitaph of a Bishop Daniel (January, 1100).

Until the reconquest (1166) by Afonso I of Portugal, Évora was suffragan to the archdiocese of Mérida. Under this king it became suffragan to the archdiocese of Braga, despite the protests of the Archbishops of Compostella, administrators of Mérida. In 1274, however, the latter succeeded in bringing Évora within their jurisdiction. Finally, it became suffragan to the archdiocese of Lisbon from 1394 to 1544, when it was made an archbishopric.

Portuguese writers have maintained that the first bishop of Évora was St. Mantius, a Roman, and a disciple of Jesus Christ, sent by the Apostles into the Iberian Peninsula as a missionary of the Gospel.

== Episcopal ordinaries ==
=== Suffragan bishops ===
==== Ancient diocese ====
- The earliest bishops are legendary:
  - Mantius
  - Brissos (d. c. 312)
  - Jordan
- Quintianus (303–314)
- Julian (566)
- Zosimus I (597)
- Sisiclus (633–646)
- Abientius (653)
- Zosimus II (656)
- Peter (666)
- Tructemund (681–688)
- Arcontius (693)

==== Restored diocese ====
1. Soeiro I (1166–1179)
2. Fernando I (1179)
3. Paio (1180–1204)
4. Soeiro II (1204–1229)
5. Fernando II (1230–1235)
6. Martinho I Pires (1237–1266)
7. Durando Pais (1267–1283)
8. Domingos Anes Jardo (1284–1289)
9. Pedro I Colaço (1289–1297)
10. Fernando III Martins (1297–1313)
11. Rodrigo Pires (1313), elect
12. Geraldo Domingues (1314–1321)
13. Gonçalo Pereira (1321), elect
14. Pedro II (1322–1340)
15. Martinho II Afonso (1341–1347)
16. Afonso I Dinis (1347–1352)
17. João I Afonso (1352–1355)
18. João II Gomes de Chaves (1355–1368)
19. Martinho III Gil de Basto (1368–1382)
20. João III Anes do Amaral (1382–1404)
21. Martinho IV (1404–1406)
22. Diogo Álvares de Brito (1406–1415)
23. Álvaro I Afonso (1415–1419)
24. Pedro III de Noronha (1419–1423),
25. Vasco I (1423–1426)
26. Álvaro II de Abreu (1429–1440)
27. Vasco II Perdigão (1443–1463)
28. Jorge da Costa (1463–1464)
29. Luís Pires (1464–1468)
30. Álvaro III Alfonso (1468–1471)
31. Garcia de Menezes (1471–1484)
32. Afonso II (1485–1522)
33. Afonso III (1523–1540)

=== Metropolitan archbishops ===
- Henrique de Portugal (24 Sep 1540 Appointed – 21 Jun 1564 Appointed, Archbishop of Lisboa {Lisbon})
- João de Melo (21 Jun 1564 Appointed – 6 Aug 1574 Died)
- Henrique de Portugal (15 Dec 1574 Appointed – 4 Jul 1578 Resigned)
- Teotónio de Bragança, S.J. (7 Dec 1578 Succeeded – 29 Jul 1602 Died)
- Alexandre de Bragança (27 Nov 1602 Appointed – 11 Sep 1608 Died)
- Diogo de Sousa (1 Mar 1610 Appointed – 30 Dec 1610 Died)
- José de Melo (18 Jul 1611 Appointed – 2 Feb 1633 Died)
- João Coutinho (3 Dec 1635 Appointed – 12 Sep 1643 Died)

Sede vacante (1643–1670)

Pedro de Lancastre (1648–1654), Administrator, not confirmed by the Pope

- Diego de Sousa (19 Jan 1671 Appointed – 23 Jan 1678 Died)
- Domingos de Gusmão, O.P. (6 Jun 1678 Appointed – 19 Nov 1689 Died)
- Luís da Silva Teles, O.SS.T. (27 Aug 1691 Appointed – 13 Jan 1703 Died)
- Simão da Gama (1 Oct 1703 Appointed – 5 Aug 1715 Died)
- Miguel de Távora, O.E.S.A. (19 Dec 1740 Confirmed – 16 Sep 1759 Died)
- João Cosme da Cunha (de Nossa Senhora da Porta), O.C.S.A. (24 Mar 1760 Confirmed – 31 Jan 1783 Died)
- Joaquim Xavier Botelho de Lima (15 Dec 1783 Appointed – 10 Apr 1800 Died)
- Manuel do Cenáculo (Vilas-Boas), T.O.R. (9 Aug 1802 Confirmed – 26 Jan 1814 Died)
- Joaquim de Santa Clara Brandão (Lopes), O.S.B. (22 Jul 1816 Confirmed – 11 Jan 1818 Died)
- Patrício da Silva, O.E.S.A. (21 Feb 1820 Confirmed – 13 Mar 1826 Confirmed, * Patriarch of Lisboa {Lisbon})
- Fortunato de São Boaventura, O. Cist. (24 Feb 1832 Confirmed – 6 Dec 1844 Died)
- Francisco da Mãe dos Homens Anes de Carvalho, O.A.D. (24 Nov 1845 Confirmed – 3 Dec 1859 Died)
- José António da Mata e Silva (13 Jul 1860 Confirmed – 5 Sep 1869 Died)
- José António Pereira Bilhano (6 Mar 1871 Confirmed – 18 Sep 1890 Died)
- Augusto Eduardo Nunes (18 Sep 1890 Succeeded – 11 Jul 1920 Died)
- Manuel Mendes da Conceição Santos (24 Jul 1920 Appointed – 30 Mar 1955 Died)
- Emanuele Trindade Salgueiro (20 May 1955 Appointed – 20 Sep 1965 Died)
- David de Sousa, O.F.M. (15 Nov 1965 Appointed – 17 Oct 1981 Resigned)
- Maurílio Jorge Quintal de Gouveia (17 Oct 1981 Appointed – 8 Jan 2008 Retired)
- José Francisco Sanches Alves (8 Jan 2008 Appointed – 2 Sep 2018 Retired)
- Francisco Senra Coelho (26 June 2018 Appointed – Present)
