= Marquis of Torres Novas =

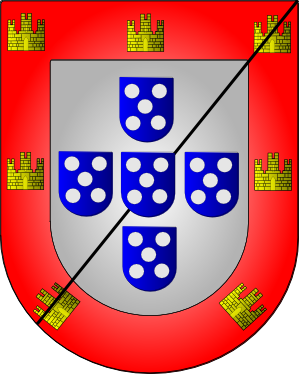
The Coat of Arms of the Marquis of Torres Novas.

The title Marquis of Torres Novas (in Portuguese Marquês de Torres Novas) was created by royal decree, dated from 27 March 1520, by King Manuel I of Portugal, to Dom John of Lencastre (1501–1571), eldest son of Infante George, Duke of Coimbra.

In 1535 the new King, John III, granted him the new title of Duke of Aveiro and, from then on, the title of Marquis of Torres Novas was allocated to the Duke of Aveiro's heir.

== List of marquesses of Torres Novas ==
1. John of Lencastre (1501–1571), son of Infante George, Duke of Coimbra (therefore grandson of King John II of Portugal). Later he became the 1st Duke of Aveiro;
2. George of Lencastre (1548–1578), his son, became 2nd Duke of Aveiro;
3. George of Lencastre (1594–1634), his grandson, became 1st Duke of Torres Novas;
4. Raimundo of Lencastre (1620–1666), his son, became 2nd Duke of Torres Novas and 4th Duke of Aveiro;
5. Peter of Lencastre, 5th Duke of Aveiro (1608–1673), also Archbishop of Évora, died without issue;
6. Gabriel of Lencastre, 7th Duke of Aveiro (1667–1745), died without issue.

== Genealogical summary ==
John I (1357-1433); King of Portugal | Philippa of Lencastre (1360-1415); Princess of England
Duarte I (1391-1438); King of Portugal
Afonso V (1432-1481); King of Portugal | Infante Fernando (1433-1470); 1st.Duke of Beja; 2nd.Duke of Viseu
Ana de Mendonça | John II (1455-1495); King of Portugal | Leonor of Viseu (1458-1525) | Manuel I (1469-1521); King of Portugal
George of Lencastre (1481-1550); 2nd.Duke of Coimbra | Afonso (1475-1491); Crown Prince
JOHN of LENCASTRE (1501-1571); 1st.Marquis of Torres Novas; 1st.Duke of Aveiro | LOUIS of LENCASTRE (1505-1574); 1st.Comendador-mor of the Order of Aviz
Comemdadores-mores of Aviz
Dukes of Aveiro; Marquises of Torres Novas | Counts of Figueiró | Knights of Coruche
Marquises of Gouvêa | Counts of Vila Nova de Portimão | Lords of Alcaçovas
Marquises of Lavradio | Marquises of Abrantes | Counts of Alcaçovas

== See also ==
- Duke of Aveiro
- Duke of Torres Novas
- List of marquisates in Portugal

== Bibliography ==
- "Nobreza de Portugal e do Brasil" – Vol. III, pages 446/447. Published by Zairol Lda., Lisbon 1989.
