= Jorge de Lencastre, Duke of Coimbra =

Jorge de Lencastre
- Duke of Coimbra
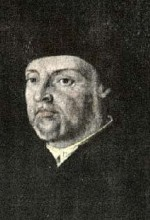
- Born: 12 August 1481; Abrantes, Kingdom of Portugal
- Died: 22 July 1550 (aged 68); Setúbal, Kingdom of Portugal
- Burial: Church of Santiago, Palmela, Portugal
- Spouse: Beatriz de Vilhena
- Issue: João de Lancastre; Afonso; Luís; Jaime; Helena; Maria de Lancastre; Filipa; Isabel
- House: House of Aviz
- Father: John II of Portugal
- Mother: Ana de Mendonça

Jorge de Lencastre (English: George; 12 August 1481 – 22 July 1550) was a Portuguese prince, illegitimate son of King John II of Portugal and Ana de Mendonça, a lady-in-waiting to Joanna la Beltraneja. He was created the second Duke of Coimbra in 1509. He was also master of the Order of Santiago and administrator of the Order of Aviz from 1492 to 1550.

== Early life ==
Jorge de Lencastre was born in Abrantes on 12 August 1481 and raised by his aunt, the king's sister, Joanna of Portugal, in the Convent of Jesus in Aveiro. On Joanna's death in 1490, Jorge was brought to the royal court, and was soon placed under the tutorship of monteiro-mor Diogo Fernandes de Almeida (the son of John II's late ally, Lopo de Almeida, Count of Abrantes).

== Succession campaign ==
After the death of the royal heir Prince Afonso in July 1491, King John II was left with no legitimate sons and no daughters he could marry off. The next legitimate successor to the throne was his cousin (and brother-in-law), Manuel, 4th Duke of Beja and grand master of the Order of Christ since 1484.

This was a disturbing prospect for John II, who trusted neither Manuel nor the powerful Order of Christ. During the purges of the high nobility in 1483–84, John II had ordered the execution of Manuel's own brother Diogo, Duke of Viseu and brother-in-law Fernando II, Duke of Braganza. Manuel himself only escaped a similar fate largely because John II regarded him as a harmless fool. Now that 'fool' stood to succeed him, and in John II's estimation, would likely undo all the king's hard-won centralizing reforms and deliver the kingdom back to the nobles.

John II consequently launched a campaign to make his natural son, Jorge de Lencastre, his heir. From Pope Innocent VIII, John II received authorization to appoint Jorge as Grand-Master of the Order of Santiago and administrator of the Order of Aviz, in April 1492. Only a few days later, Jorge's tutor, Diogo Fernandes de Almeida, was appointed Prior of Crato (head of the Portuguese branch of the knights of St. John Hospitaller).

Meanwhile, Queen Eleanor set about knitting a rival campaign, in conjunction with the Order of Christ, to prevent Jorge's advancement and protect the position of Manuel (her brother) as heir.

In 1494, John II dispatched an embassy to Rome, headed by two members of the Almeida clan, to petition Pope Alexander VI to legitimize Jorge de Lencastre. The petition was rejected, bringing the campaign to a disappointing end.

John II, however, had no intention of just handing the kingdom over to Manuel's minions. In the will laid out just before his death in 1495, John II requested that Manuel appoint Jorge de Lencastre as Duke of Coimbra and Lord of Montemor-o-Velho and urged Manuel, on his accession, to pass all his other titles and possessions, including the mastership of the Order of Christ and the island of Madeira, over to Jorge. The concentration of power would have made Jorge de Lencastre the most powerful man in the kingdom, reminiscent of his powerful great-grandfather Peter of Coimbra (a comparison suggested by John II himself).

Mindful of avoiding a civil war, Manuel agreed to many of the items in John II's will, but rejected others — notably, Manuel insisted on retaining the Order of Christ for himself. Manuel was not in a hurry to fulfill the rest of the terms. The title of Duke of Coimbra was conferred on Jorge de Lencastre only in May 1500, and confirmation was delayed until May 1509, nearly fifteen years after his father's death.

John II had also requested that young Jorge de Lencastre would be married to a royal princess, having Manuel promise his own first daughter, when they came of age. Manuel only partly fulfilled this in 1500 by betrothing Jorge to Beatriz de Vilhena, the daughter of Álvaro of Braganza, not an infanta but nonetheless a princess of royal blood.

== During Manuel's reign ==
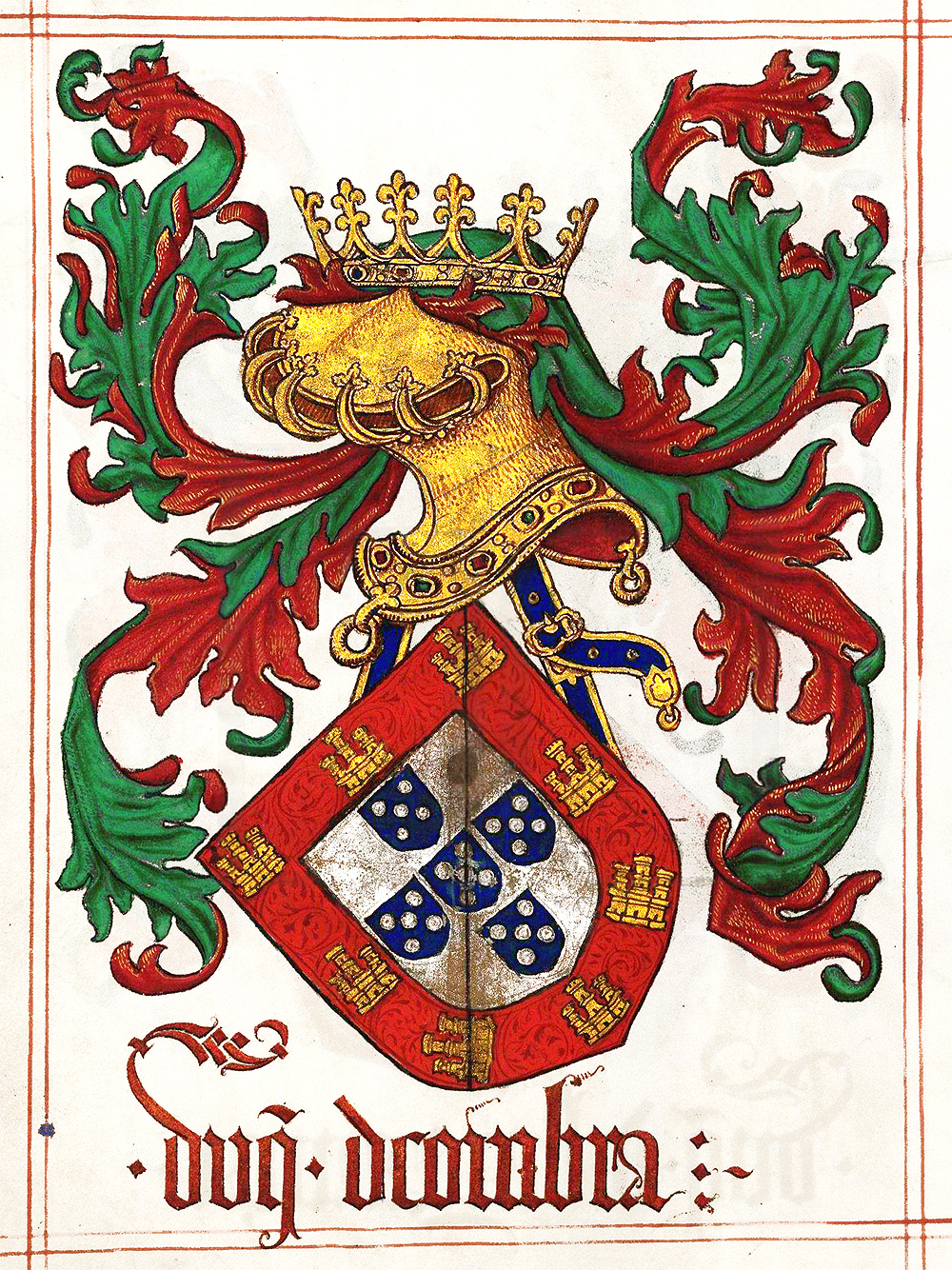
Arms of D. Jorge de Lencastre, 2nd Duke of Coimbra, from Jean du Cro's Livro do Armeiro-Mor, 1509.

Most of the details of Jorge's subsequent life and career are marred by hagiographers of Manuel, eager to portray the king's rival in the worst possible light. But far from the lazy and dissolute picture painted by the royal scribes, the chroniclers of the Order of Santiago seem to have regarded Jorge de Lencastre as a particularly diligent leader and administrator.

The Duke continued as an important figure in Portuguese politics, particularly in the first decade or so of Manuel's reign. The Order of Santiago was Jorge's principal power base. Jorge established something akin to an 'opposition' court at the Order's headquarters in Palmela. He gathered around him the principal loyalists of John II, who now became political opponents of King Manuel I of Portugal, notably the Almeida clan, the Ataíde family, and, of course, his mother's own family — notably, his uncle, António de Mendonça Furtado, a commendador of the Order of Aviz. Other opposition characters gathered around Jorge included Álvaro de Castro and Diogo Lopo da Silveira (Baron of Alvito), and notable India navigators Vasco da Gama and Francisco de Almeida. Jorge is also said to have had the support of many "New Christians", to have personally given them his protection and to have fought against the introduction of the Holy Inquisition into Portugal.

Jorge's party played a rather important role in the early India expeditions. They formed the 'pragmatic' party, insisting, like John II had, that the India expeditions were a commercial venture, a means for the enrichment of the treasury, a 'Renaissance' focus on wealth and power. Manuel's party had a more 'messianic' outlook, seeing the overseas expeditions through the Medieval goggles of Holy War and religious mission, coming up with schemes for two-pronged invasions of Egypt, marches on Mecca and the reconquest of Jerusalem. In this respect, Jorge (if not himself personally, certainly the party he led) played a vital role in keeping the India expeditions on a sane and viable track. Early India armada captains were drawn more from his party, than from Manuel's.

In the early years, Jorge's power was partly reliant on the hope that he might yet succeed Manuel, but that prospect diminished quickly as Manuel's new queen, Maria of Aragon, produced a succession of sons. As time went on, his early fierce partisans began to slowly distance themselves and look for compromise and advancement with Manuel. For some, that meant leaving Jorge's Orders of Santiago and Aviz and passing over to Manuel's Order of Christ. Among those who made the switch were Francisco de Almeida and Vasco da Gama.

Jorge picked a particularly unfortunate fight with Vasco da Gama, once a loyal partisan. After da Gama's glorious return from India in 1499, Manuel deftly promised the town of Sines as a reward to the admiral. But Sines was the property of the Order of Santiago. Instinctively, Jorge was disposed to allow it, as a reward to one of his own; but since it was on the king's order, he feared it was the thin end of the wedge to more royal appropriations of Order properties. So he decided to make a stand on principle and stepped in personally to prevent it. He went so far as to secure the banishment of da Gama from Sines in 1507. This prompted da Gama to make his final break with Jorge, leave his beloved Order of Santiago and switch to the rival Order of Christ.

Jorge de Lencastre dedicated himself to defending his two knightly orders, Santiago and Aviz, from the unremitting poaching by Manuel's Order of Christ. In May 1505, Jorge managed to secure a royal order prohibiting knights from leaving his orders without his express permission. But Manuel soon obtained from Pope Alexander VI two bulls to undermine him — one from July 1505, giving the King of Portugal the right to dispose of the property of all three Orders; another in January 1506, authorizing knights to move freely from other Orders to the Order of Christ. However, Jorge continued to resist, and made a point of punishing knights who left without permission (for example, seizing the Sesimbra commenda of João de Menezes, Count of Tarouca, for having taken up the position of Prior of Crato without his consent).

In 1509, Jorge introduced a new set of rules for the Order of Santiago, overhauling its administration in a centralized fashion, bringing it closer in line with the rules of their Spanish brethren.

But with so many defections, Jorge found it hard to maintain his political footing, and his star was quickly waning. In 1516, the humiliation was complete when Manuel secured from Pope Leo X the authority to appoint Jorge's successors as grand masters of the orders of Santiago and Aviz.

== Later years ==
King Manuel died in late 1521, and was succeeded by his son, John III of Portugal. But the conflict with Jorge de Lencastre continued, the opposition standard taken up with more energy by Jorge's son, João de Lencastre, Marquis of Torres Novas. The sons of the old rivals butted heads politically and, increasingly, in the scandal sheets. In the late 1520s, João led the opposition to the marriage of King John III's brother, Infante Ferdinand, to Dona Guiomar Coutinho, a prominent noble heiress to the great feudal estates of Marialva and Loulé, on the grounds that he had already secretly married her. The King responded by locking up João de Lencastre in the Castle of São Jorge for some years (an episode later dramatized by Camilo Castelo Branco in his play O Marquez de Torres-Novas).

Jorge himself produced a notable scandal late in life when, at the age of 67, he pursued (and married) a 16-year-old girl, Maria Manuela (daughter of Dom Fernando de Lima). King John III gave great publicity to the scandal, while, behind Jorge's back, securing an annulment from the pope.

When Jorge de Lencastre finally died in late July 1550, John III moved quickly to seize control of the military orders. From Pope Julius III, he received a bull in August 1550 appointing him personally as the master of both the Order of Santiago and the Order of Aviz. This was followed up by a second bull, issued under great diplomatic pressure in December 1551, appointing the Kings of Portugal as masters in perpetuity of both military orders, thus bringing an end to the independence of the orders Jorge had fought so hard to retain.

At Jorge's death, John III took back the title of 'Duke of Coimbra' for the Crown. The official explanation was that Coimbra was a royal town and the existence of a feudal title bearing the town's name was inappropriate. The real reason was probably that the king was eager to erase a title that had been borne by two notable challengers of royal power, a name that might still have a magical pull on the imagination of the next bearer. The lands associated with the Duke of Coimbra were passed to the Duke of Aveiro, a new title created by John III shortly before (c. 1535) for Jorge's son and heir, João de Lencastre. The line of Lencastre would continue through the Dukes of Aveiro.

== Marriage ==
In 1500, Jorge married Beatriz de Vilhena, daughter of Álvaro of Braganza, brother of Ferdinand II, Duke of Braganza. Beatriz died in 1535.

Jorge had several children from his marriage with Beatriz de Vilhena:

- João de Lencastre, 1st Duke of Aveiro
- Afonso de Lencastre, Comendador-mor of São Tiago. He had a son:
  - Álvaro of Lencastre, 3rd Duke of Aveiro
- Luís de Lencastre, Comendador-mor of Aviz, married Magdalena de Granada, granddaughter of Abu l-Hasan Ali, Sultan of Granada and Isabel de Solís
- Jaime de Lencastre, Prior of São Pedro de Torres Vedras, 1st General-inquisitor of the kingdom
- Helena de Lencastre, Comendadeira of the Royal Monastery of Santos
- Maria de Lencastre, religious in the Monastery of Saint John in Setúbal (Soror Maria Madalena)
- Filipa de Lencastre, prioress of the Monastery of Saint John in Setúbal
- Isabel de Lencastre, religious in the Monastery of Saint John in Setúbal and after that in the Royal Monastery of Santos.

He also had several illegitimate children.

Jorge died in the castle of Palmela on 22 July 1550.

== Ancestry ==
Ancestors of Jorge de Lencastre, Duke of Coimbra

8. Edward, King of Portugal
4. Afonso V of Portugal
9. Eleanor of Aragon
2. John II of Portugal
10. Peter, Duke of Coimbra
5. Isabel of Coimbra
11. Isabella of Urgell
1. Jorge de Lancastre, Duke of Coimbra
12. Afonso Furtado de Mendonça
6. Nuno Furtado de Mendonça
13. Constança Nogueira
3. Ana de Mendonça
14. Fernão Martins do Carvalhal
7. Leonor da Silva
15. Uruana Pereira

== See also ==
- Duke of Coimbra
- Dukedoms in Portugal

Portuguese nobility
Preceded by Peter, 1st Duke of Coimbra	Duke of Coimbra; 1495–1550	Succeeded by Augustus, 3rd Duke of Coimbra
