= Luís de Almeida Portugal, 2nd Marquess of Lavradio =

Portuguese nobleman and colonial administrator

His Excellency The Marquis of Lavradio
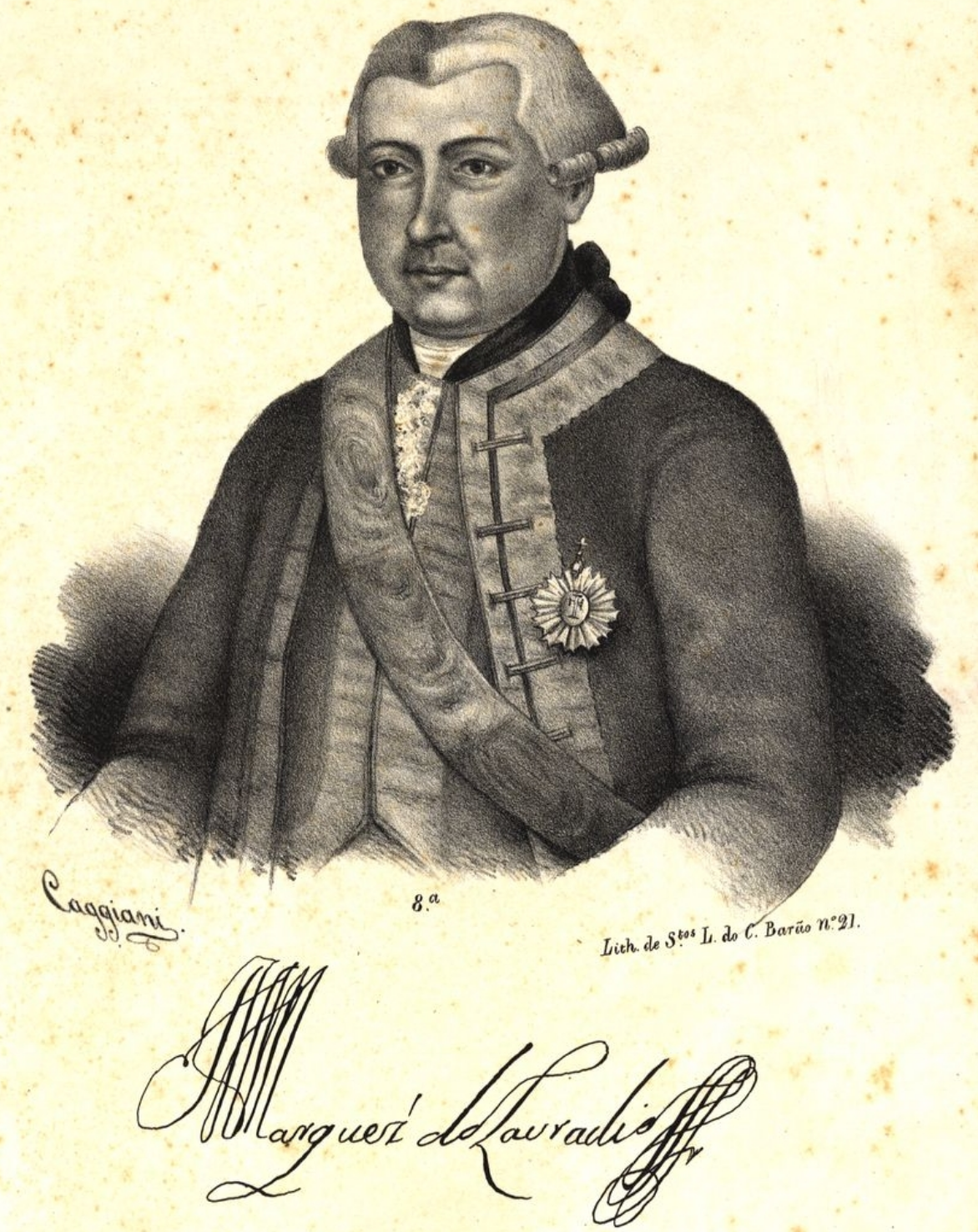

Viceroy of Brazil
- In office 4 November 1769 – 30 April 1778
- Monarch: Joseph I of Portugal
- Preceded by: Antônio de Moura Tavares
- Succeeded by: Luís de Vasconcelos e Sousa

Personal details
- Born: 27 June 1729 Lisbon, Kingdom of Portugal
- Died: May 2, 1790 (aged 60) Kingdom of Portugal

D. Luís de Almeida Portugal Soares de Alarcão de Eça e Melo Silva Mascarenhas, 2nd Marquis of Lavradio and 5th Count of Avintes (27 June 1729 – 2 May 1790) was a Portuguese nobleman and colonial administrator, Viceroy of Brazil from 1769 to 1778. He was the second ruler of the colony after its capital was moved from Salvador to Rio de Janeiro in 1763. He was the son and heir of the 1st Marquis of the same title, D. António de Almeida Soares e Portugal and his wife, D. Francisca das Chagas Mascarenhas, sister of the 8th Duke of Aveiro. During the Spanish invasion of Portugal in 1762, he commanded the 1st Cascais Infantry Regiment as its Colonel.

== Biography ==
He was appointed Viceroy of Brazil in 1769, his government lasted 10 years. In his government, the Marquis of Lavradio promulgated the regulation of the diamond district. This regulation, made by the Marquis of Pombal, and promulgated by the charter of 10 July 1771, is a clear proof of how thorough was the spirit of the great minister and rigor with which he proceeded in these inspections. About this regulation the Brazilian writer Pereira da Silva wrote that it ordered him to: 'limit the number of residents in the diamond district, and state their professions, and invested the steward of almost dictatorial and absolute powers in all matters military, administrative, judicial and police, reporting directly to the metropolitan government, and without any dependence of the captains, generals.

The government implemented strict regulations and penalties to prevent smuggling. These measures were introduced because the product was easy to transport and conceal. Despite the precautions taken by the authorities, local residents faced significant hardships, and the regular course of smuggling continued to progress.

The Marquis of Lavradio also had to contend with the caveat raised in Brazil, mainly in relation to the gentiles, the extinction of the Society of Jesuits. The system of indoctrination was not abandoned because they are exempted him and banished the Jesuits out of the Portuguese dominions. Not enough, and even finding themselves empowered for that purpose the existing religious orders in Brazil, the Capuchins fervently followed the footsteps of Jesuit priests and was employed in the missions dispatched to the interior, in charge of calling the nomadic tribes of social life, leading them to abandon their wild habits.

In 1779, two years after the death of King Joseph I of Portugal, the Marquis of Lavradio left the government of Brazil, being replaced by Luís de Vasconcelos e Sousa.

== See also ==
- Marquesses of Lavradio
- Counts of Avintes
- Counts of Lavradio
- Counts of Torres Vedras
