= António de Almeida Soares de Portugal, 1st Marquess of Lavradio =

Portuguese statesman

D. António de Almeida Soares de Portugal, 1st Count and 1st Marquess of Lavradio, 4th Count of Avintes, Governor General of Angola and Viceroy of Brazil. Born in Lisbon, Portugal on 1 May 1701; died in São Salvador da Bahia, Brazil on 4 July 1760. The first Marquess of Lavradio was a prominent Portuguese statesman and the head of an established noble family.

He was born in Lisbon, Portugal on 1 May 1701. In his own right, he was the 4th Count of Avintes, also in the Peerage of Portugal, and 8th Lord of Avintes. In gratitude for the exceptional services to his country of his uncle D. Tomás de Almeida, 1st Cardinal Patriarch of Lisbon, by Letters Patent of 4 June 1725, King John V of Portugal conferred on him the Seigniory of the town of Lavradio, and the title of Count of Lavradio, in perpetuity, as well as the commandery of São Pedro de Castelões in the Order of Christ, adding to the commanderies already held by his predecessors in the same order.

By Letters Patent of 18 October 1753 he was created 1st Marquess of Lavradio, a title also in the Peerage of Portugal, by King José I of Portugal.

The first Marquess held key administrative positions under kings João V of Portugal and José I of Portugal, notably as 38th Governor General of Angola, from 1748 to 1753, in recognition of which he was elevated to the marquessate, and, albeit briefly, as 8th Viceroy of Brazil in 1760.

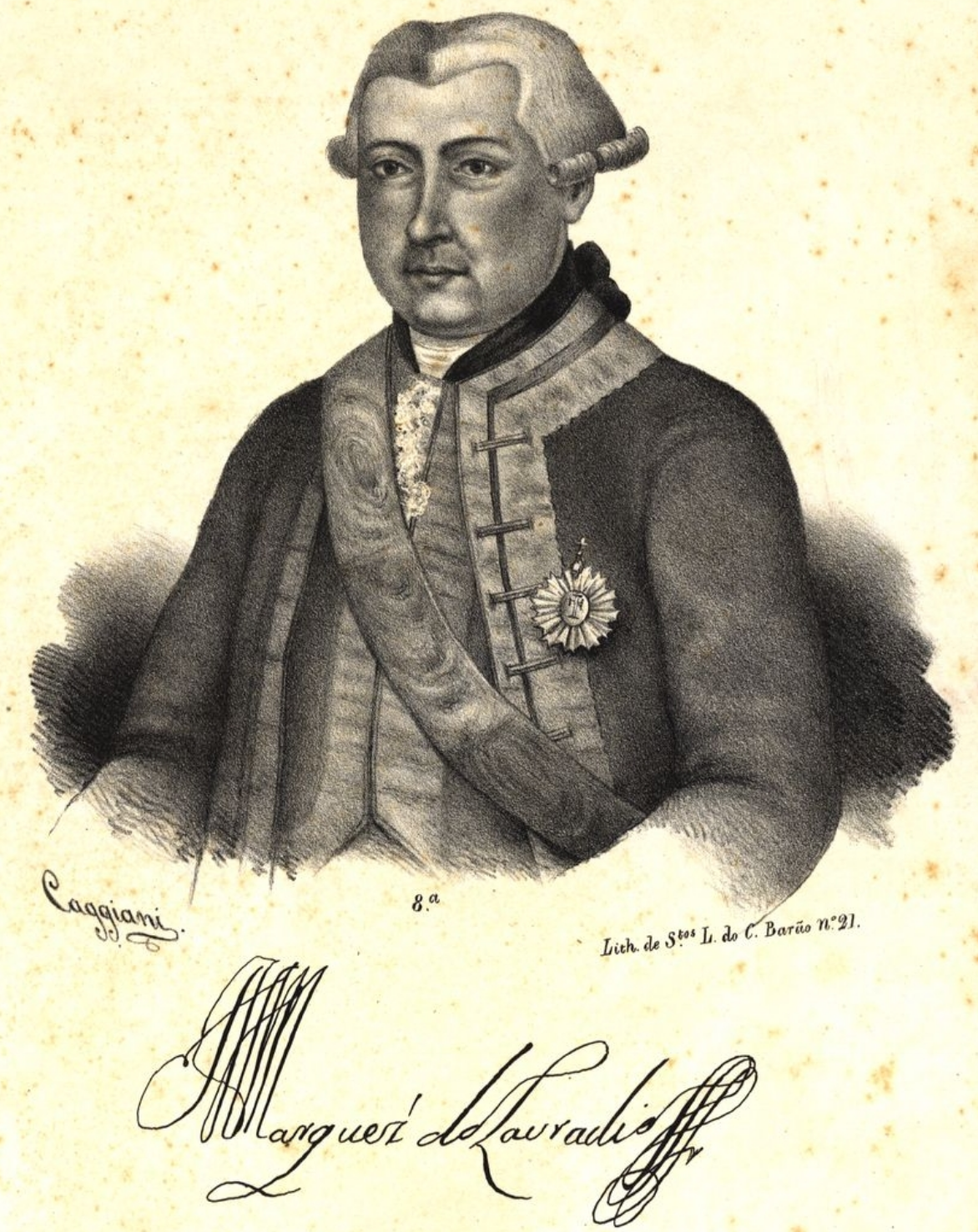
D. Luís de Almeida Portugal Soares de Alarcão d'Eça e Mello Silva Mascarenhas, the eldest son and heir

He married D. Francisca das Chagas Mascarenhas, daughter of D. Martinho Mascarenhas, 3rd Marquess of Gouvêa and 6th Count of Santa Cruz, and his wife. D. Maria Rosa de Távora, daughter of the 2nd Marquess of Távora. She died six years later in childbirth, having borne her husband five children. Following the extinction of her brother, the 8th Duke of Aveiro's legitimate descendants, her grandson, the 3rd Marquess of Lavradio, became heir to the Houses of Aveiro, Gouvêa and Santa Cruz.

- D. Mariana de Almeida (b. Lisbon, 27 August 1727, d. in infancy);
- D. Joana de Almeida, a nun in the Luz Monastery (b. Lisbon, 24 August 1728);
- D. Luís de Almeida Portugal Soares de Alarcão d'Eça e Mello Silva Mascarenhas, 2nd marquess of Lavradio and 5th Count of Avintes (b. Quinta da Conceição, Torres Vedras 27 June 1729, d. Lisbon 2 May 1790);
- D. Inácia Rosa de Tavora (b. Lisbon 30 August 1730, d. in infancy)
- D. Martinho Lourenço de Almeida (b. Lisbon, 26 September 1731, d. Lisbon, 22 April 1797)

The Marquess of Lavradio arrived in Salvador da Bahia, at the time the capital of Brazil, at the beginning of 1760, taking up his position as the new Viceroy on 9 January, already grievously ill. Doctors' orders dictated he establish his headquarters outside the city of Bahia, where he died only six months later, on 4 July, aged 59, from a large tumour in his lungs which had metastasized to his liver. His body was brought back to the city where it lay in State in the Palace of the Governors, after which he was given a funeral with full military honours. He was buried in the Convent of São Francisco, as was his want.

== See also ==
- Marquesses of Lavradio
- Counts of Avintes
- Counts of Lavradio
- Counts of Torres Vedras
