= List of governors-general of Brazil =

This is a list of governors-general of colonial Brazil (Portuguese: governadores-gerais). The office was created by King João III in 1549. From 1640 onward, some governors-general held the title of viceroy (Portuguese: vice-rei). The office was the same, only the title was different in order to correspond to the dignity of the individual appointed to the office. From 1720, however, until the arrival of King João VI, king of Portugal, in Rio de Janeiro, in 1808, all governors-general were viceroys.

== List ==
	Name	Image	Title	Time in office (approx.)	Ref.
1	Tomé de Sousa		governor	7 July 1549 — 1 May 1553	
2	Duarte da Costa		governor	1 May 1553 — 3 January 1558	
3	Mem de Sá		governor	3 January 1558 — 2 March 1572	
1572 - Division of Brazil into two governor-generalship, one in Bahia (north) and the other in Rio de Janeiro (south)
4	Luís de Brito e Almeida		governor (in Bahia)	10 December 1572 — 12 April 1578	
1578 - Reunification of the governor-generalship in Bahia
5	Lourenço da Veiga		governor-general	12 April 1578 — 17 June 1581	
6	Manuel Teles Barreto		governor-general	11 May 1582 — 9 May 1587	
7	Francisco de Sousa		governor-general	1592 — 1 April 1602	
8	Diogo Botelho		governor-general	1 April 1602 — 1607	
1608 - Division of Brazil into two governor-generalship, one in Bahia (north) and the other in Rio de Janeiro (south)
9	Diogo de Meneses e Sequeira		governor-general (in Bahia)	1608 — 22 August 1612	
1612 - Reunification of the governor-generalship in Bahia
10	Gaspar de Sousa		governor-general	1613 — 1 January 1617	
11	Luís de Sousa Count of Prado		governor-general	1 January 1617 — 12 October 1621	
1621 - State of Maranhão becomes autonomous (1621)
12	Diogo de Mendonça Furtado		governor-general	12 October 1621 — 26 July 1624	
13	Francisco de Moura Rolim		governor-general	1625 - 1627	
14	Diogo Luís de Oliveira		governor-general	1627 — 11 December 1635	
15	Pedro da Silva; Count of São Lourenço		governor-general	11 December 1635 — 23 January 1639	
16	Fernando de Mascarenhas; Count of Torre		governor-general	23 January 1639 — 1640	
17	Jorge de Mascarenhas; Marquis of Montalvão		1# viceroy	26 May 1640 — 16 April 1641	
18	António Teles da Silva		governor-general	1642 — 26 December 1647	
19	António Teles de Meneses; Count of Vila Pouca de Aguiar		governor-general	26 December 1647 — 10 March 1650	
20	João Rodrigues de Vasconcelos e Sousa, 2nd Count of Castelo Melhor; Count of Castelo Melhor		governor-general	10 March 1650 — 14 December 1654	
21	Jerónimo de Ataíde; Count of Atouguia		governor-general	14 December 1654 — 20 June 1657	
22	Francisco Barreto de Meneses		governor-general	20 June 1657 — 21 July 1663	
23	Vasco Mascarenhas; Count of Óbidos		2# viceroy	21 July 1663 — 13 June 1667	
24	Alexandre de Sousa Freire		governor-general	13 July 1667 — 8 May 1671	
25	Afonso Furtado de Castro de Mendonça; Viscount of Barbacena		governor-general	8 May 1671 — 26 November 1675	
26	Roque da Costa Barreto		governor-general	5 March 1678 — 23 May 1682	
27	António de Sousa Meneses		governor-general	23 May 1682 — 4 June 1684	
28	António Luís de Sousa Telo de Meneses; Marquis of Minas		governor-general	4 June 1684 — 4 June 1687	
29	Matias da Cunha		governor-general	4 June 1687 — 24 October 1688	
30	Antônio Luís Gonçalves da Câmara Coutinho		governor-general	8 October 1690 — 22 May 1694	
31	João de Lencastre		governor-general	22 May 1694 — 3 July 1702	
32	Rodrigo da Costa		governor-general	3 July 1702 — 8 September 1705	
33	Luís César de Meneses		governor-general	8 September 1705 — 3 May 1710	
34	Lourenço de Almada; Count of Avranches		governor-general	3 May 1710 — 14 October 1711	
35	Pedro de Vasconcelos e Sousa		governor-general	14 October 1711 — 14 October 1714	
36	Pedro António de Meneses Noronha; Marquis of Angeja		3# viceroy	14 October 1714 — 11 June 1718	
37	Sancho de Faro e Sousa; Count of Vimieiro		governor-general	21 August 1718 — 13 October 1719	
38	Vasco Fernandes César de Meneses; Count of Sabugosa	semmoldura	4# viceroy	23 November 1720 — 11 May 1735	
39	André de Melo e Castro; Count of Galveias		5# viceroy	11 May 1735 — 17 December 1749	
40	Luís Pedro Peregrino de Carvalho e Ataíde; Count of Atouguia		6# viceroy	17 December 1749 — 17 August 1754	
41	Marcos José de Noronha e Brito; Count of Arcos		7# viceroy	23 December 1755 — 9 January 1760	
42	António de Almeida Soares Portugal; Marquis of Lavradio		8# viceroy	9 January 1760 — 4 July 1760	
43	António Álvares da Cunha; Count of Cunha		9# viceroy	27 June 1763 — 31 August 1767	
44	Antônio Rolim de Moura Tavares; Count of Azambuja		10# viceroy	17 November 1767 — 4 November 1769	
45	Luís de Almeida Portugal Soares Mascarenhas; Marquis of Lavradio and Count of Avintes		11# viceroy	4 November 1769 — 30 April 1778	
1775 - Reunification of the State of Brazil
46	Luís de Vasconcelos e Sousa; Count of Figueiró		12# viceroy	30 April 1778 — 9 May 1790	
47	José Luís de Castro; Count of Resende		13# viceroy	4 June 1790 — 14 October 1801	
48	Fernando José de Portugal e Castro; Marquis of Aguiar		14# viceroy	14 October 1801 — 14 October 1806	
49	Marcos de Noronha e Brito; Count of Arcos		15# viceroy	14 October 1806 — 22 January 1808	

== See also ==
- Governorate General of Brazil

=== More lists of office-holders of Brazil ===
- List of monarchs of Brazil
- List of presidents of Brazil
