= Luis de Almeida, 1st Count of Avintes =

Portuguese nobleman (d. 1671)

Luis de Almeida
- Count of Avintes,
- Died: 22 December 1671; Lisbon, Kingdom of Portugal

D. Luis de Almeida, Count of Avintes (b. ? – d. 22 December 1671), was a Portuguese nobleman and military man and Governor of Rio de Janeiro where the region went through perhaps the most acute phase of the economic crisis that the institution of the Portuguese East India Company had aggravated. One of his first acts as governor saw him requesting from the Chamber of resources to pay the salaries of the garrison, which, as usual, were in great arrears. Later in 1661–1662 he became the last Portuguese Governor of Tangier.

== See also ==
- Marquesses of Lavradio
