= Independentes =

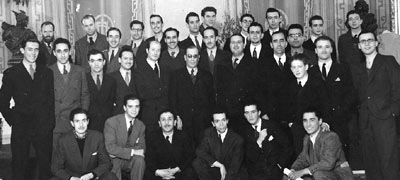
Os Independentes

Independentes ('Independents') was a Portuguese artist group known for exhibitions of abstract art, active in the 1940s. The exhibitions' main organizer and coordinator, painter and architect Fernando Lanhas, coincidentally is the central figure of Portuguese abstractionism.

After the I Exhibition in April 1943 in the Fine Arts School of Porto, with sculptures by Altino Maia, Mário Truta, Arlindo Rocha, Serafim Teixeira, Augusto Tavares and Manuel Pereira da Silva, the Independentes exhibitions were started when the sculptures were placed outside the school and several times outside Porto. A first effort towards decentralization, this did not avoid a certain marginalization of the Porto artists in events and initiatives of greater visibility and impact in the capital.

Then the II Independentes Exhibition shows were held in February 1944 at the Atheneum Commercial of Porto, with sculptures by Altino Maia, Arlindo Rocha, Eduardo Tavares, Joaquim Meireles, Manuel da Cunha Monteiro, Maria Graciosa de Carvalho, Mário Truta, M. Félix de Brito, Manuel Pereira da Silva and Serafim Teixeira. It would be from there that the action of Fernando Lanhas was felt in the consistent quality of the catalogue and the exhibitions, as well as in his persistence in keeping alive the initiatives.

The III Independentes Exhibition took place in the same year, in the hall of the Coliseum of Porto, with sculptures by Abel Salazar, Altino Maia, António Azevedo, Arlindo Rocha, Eduardo Tavares, Henrique Moreira, Manuel Pereira da Silva, Mário Truta and Sousa Caldas. In the catalogue of the exhibition that toured Coimbra, Leiria and Lisbon in 1945, it was stated that the name of "Independents" is not a name at random but involves the awareness that art is a heritage of humanity and hence that "Our presence is varied, but should be understood that this enables us to build the future, as it also cannot deny us the right to remember the past." For Fernando Lanhas, the "Independentes Exhibition" of Porto was a significant historical moment in Portuguese painting and sculpture. First, because, together, painters and sculptors of different training (the reason for the word "Independents" had no affiliation with any "ism" in particular) also engaged in a collective action and immersed themselves in the same enthusiasm. Second, because there appeared, without pre-concepts or complexes, original and fruitful abstraction, and, thirdly, because the artists escaped from the centralized voracity of the capital.

Between 1946 and 1950, there were four more independent exhibitions in Bookstore Gallery Portugála, in Porto in 1946, 1948 and 1950, and in Braga in 1949.

From 1943 to 1950, exhibited in almost all expositions were the Independentes painters Fernando Lanhas, Júlio Resende, Júlio Pomar, Nadir Afonso, Rui Pimentel, Dordio Gomes, Carlos João Chambers Ramos, Amândio Silva, António Lino, Aníbal Alcino and Vítor Palla.

== Exhibitions ==
- I Independentes Exhibition, in the Escola Superior de Belas-Artes do Porto (1943)
- II Independentes Exhibition, in the Ateneu Comercial do Porto (1944)
- III Independentes Exhibition, in the Coliseu do Porto (1945)
