= Afonso Furtado de Castro de Mendonça =

Afonso Furtado de Castro de Mendonça, 1st Viscount of Barbacena (Lisbon, ca. 1610 - Salvador, Bahia, 3 October 1675) was a Portuguese noble and colonial administrator.

== Biography ==
He was the son of João Jorge Furtado de Mendonça, 4th Lord of Barbacena and Alcaide-Mor (Chief Magistrate/Governor) of Covilhã, and his wife, Dona Mariana de Vilhena.

He became Commander of the Military Order of Christ, 5th Lord of Barbacena, General of Artillery and Cavalry in the province of Alentejo, and Military Governor of Beira in the Castelo Branco district.

He fought in the Portuguese Restoration War, distinguishing himself greatly. King Alfonso VI granted him the title of Viscount of Barbacena via a royal decree dated 19 December 1661. He was a member of the Council of War, and was appointed Governor and Captain-General of Brazil in 1671. During his tenure, he ordered the exploration of emerald mines.
He died in Brazil in October 1675.

He was married to Dona Maria do Távora, the youngest daughter of João Furtado de Mendonça.
He was succeeded by his son Jorge Furtado de Mendonça (died 1708) as 2nd Viscount of Barbacena.
