= António Luís de Sousa, 2nd Marquis of Minas =

Portuguese general and noble (1644–1721)

His Lordship The Marquis of Minas
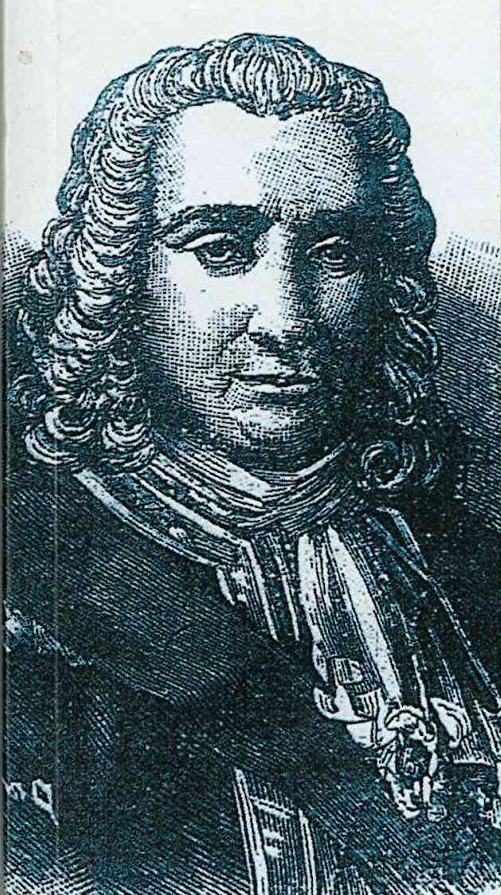

Governor-General of Brazil

2nd Marquis of Minas
- In office 1684–1687
- Monarch: Peter II
- Preceded by: António de Sousa Meneses
- Succeeded by: Matias da Cunha

Personal details
- Born: 6 April 1644 Kingdom of Portugal
- Died: 15 December 1721 (aged 77) Kingdom of Portugal

Military service
- Allegiance: Kingdom of Portugal
- Years of service: 1658–1721
- Rank: General
- Battles/wars: Portuguese Restoration War; War of the Spanish Succession

Dom António Luís de Sousa, 2nd Marquis of Minas and 4th Count of Prado (6 April 1644 – 25 December 1721) was a Portuguese general and Governor-General of Brazil from 1684 to 1687.

He was the son of Francisco, the first Marquis of Minas, and his second wife Eufrásia Filipa de Lima.

From a very young age on, he was destined for a military career. At the age of 14, he was present with his father at the Battle of the Lines of Elvas and later he fought the Spanish in the northern Minho province, becoming a general in 1665 after the conquest of the Galician town of A Guarda.

After the Peace Treaty of Lisbon he became military governor of Minho in the absence of his father, who was sent as ambassador to Rome. He assumed the title of Marquis of Minas after the death of his father in 1674.

Between 1684 and 1687 he was governor-general of Brazil, where he was able to restore the peace after the mismanagement of his predecessors, and was confronted with a serious epidemic in the Bahia province.

In 1687 he returned to Portugal and was appointed counsellor of war.

== War of the Spanish Succession ==
At the outbreak of the War of Spanish Succession (1702–1715), King Peter II of Portugal initially supported France but on 16 May 1703, Portugal and England signed the Methuen Treaty. This trade accord was followed in December 1703 by a military alliance between Portugal, Austria, the Netherlands and Great Britain against Philip, the French candidate for the Spanish throne.

Minas was sent to the border to prepare the Portuguese army for war, but in 1704 the Franco-Spanish troops attacked first, the Duke of Berwick conquering Salvaterra, Segura and Beira. Tilly invaded Alentejo and took Portalegre, and the Spanish general Villadarias took Castelo de Vide.

The invasion was stopped by lack of support from Madrid, allied invasions of Barcelona and Gibraltar and the resistance organised by Minas (who won a minor battle at Monsanto). Berwick had to withdraw his troops to Spain.

In October 1705 a first invasion of Spain was launched under the command of Henri de Massue, 1st Earl of Galway and the Marquis of Minas. The aim was to conquer Badajoz, thus opening a second front to support Peterborough in Catalonia. The relationship between the two allied commanders was so bad, and the coordination so poor, that it was not too difficult for the experienced French commander de Tessé to repel the invasion.

In 1706 de Tessé was beaten near Barcelona, and it became apparent that the border with Portugal was unprotected. Minas took his chance and marched his army all the way to Madrid, bypassing Badajoz. The stiffest resistance was met at Alcántara, where the garrison of 4,200 resisted for five days until it had to capitulate. Although the army of the Duke of Berwick was in the vicinity, it was not strong enough to risk a battle.

On 28 June 1706 the Portuguese army entered Madrid and Archduke Charles was acclaimed King of Spain. It soon became clear that the allies in Madrid were very isolated. The population was hostile and the Duke of Berwick was cutting off communications with Portugal and Aragon. The decision was made to abandon Madrid and to join the allied troops in Valencia. The Duke of Berwick was waiting for them and inflicted a crushing defeat in the Battle of Almansa. Minas was replaced as commander of the Portuguese troops in Spain by his nephew Pedro Manuel de Ataíde.

On his return to Portugal he was appointed estribeiro-mor (chief equerry) to the queen, for the rest of his life. He was succeeded by his son João de Sousa, 3rd Marquis of Minas.

== In literature ==
Louis de Rouvroy, duc de Saint-Simon, mentions in his Mémoires Dom António Luís de Sousa's role in the war of Spanish succession in the following terms:

This Marquis Das Minas (...) is the one who always commanded the Portuguese army against Philip V, who took many fortresses in Spain, which he kept for a short time, even entered Madrid, which he could not keep, and who commanded a wing of the Archduke's army with eighteen Portuguese battalions at the Battle of Almanza, which the Duke of Berwick won completely on April 25, 1707, and which had such great consequences. Das Minas continued to serve as commander until the peace. He had been viceroy of Brazil.
