= João de Sousa, 3rd Marquis of Minas =

Portuguese nobleman

João de Sousa
- Marquis of Minas, Count of Prado
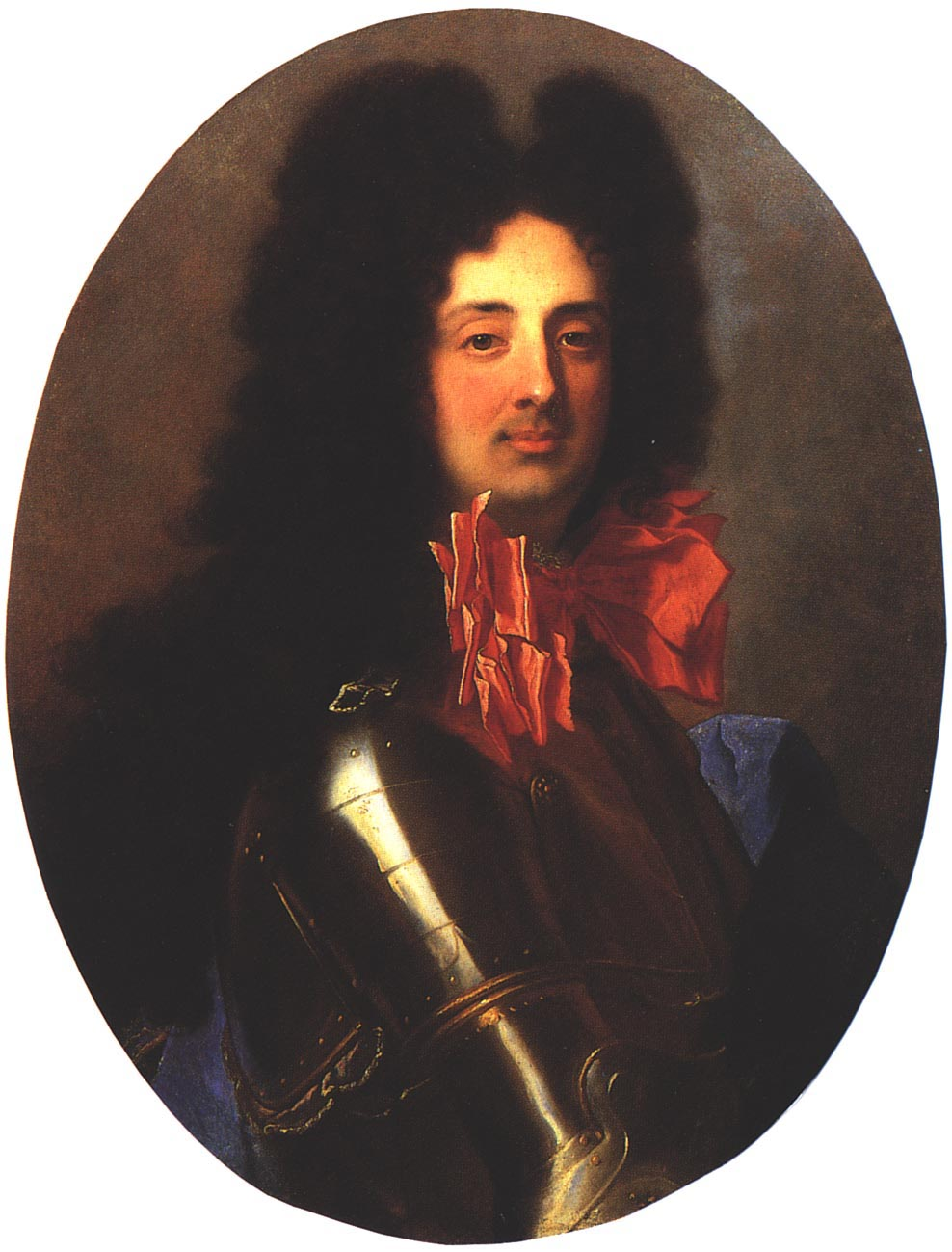
- Portrait by Hyacinthe Rigaud, 1695

Marquis of Minas
- Full name: João de Sousa
- Born: 29 December 1666; Viana do Castelo, Kingdom of Portugal
- Died: 17 September 1722 (aged 55)
- Noble family: de Sousa
- Spouse: Françoise Madeleine de Neufville
- Issue: António Caetano Luís de Sousa,4th Marquis of Minas; Maria Tereza de Sousa
- Father: António Luís de Sousa, 2nd Marquis of Minas
- Mother: Maria Madalena de Noronha

João de Sousa, 3rd Marquis of Minas (Viana do Castelo; 29 December 1666 - murdered on 17 September 1722) was a Portuguese nobleman. He was also the 6th Count of Prado.

== Life ==
João de Sousa was born in Viana do Castelo on 29 December 1666 to António Luís de Sousa, 2nd Marquis of Minas, and Maria Madalena de Noronha.

In 1694, together with Pedro Manuel de Ataíde, he had a conflict with the Corregedor of Bairro Alto, which resulted in the death of the Corregedor. Both young men fled to France, where they came under the protection of François de Neufville, duc de Villeroi and fought in his army.

After being pardoned by the King of Portugal in 1704, he returned to his home country and served under his father during the War of Spanish Succession and eventually reached the rank of Lieutenant General of Cavalry.

On 14 January 1714 he was made a gentleman of the chambers King John V of Portugal.

He was made a member of the Royal Council of War on 26 October 1714.

He was a commander in the Order of Christ.
