= Maria Isabel Wittenhall van Zeller =

Vaccination pioneer in Portugal

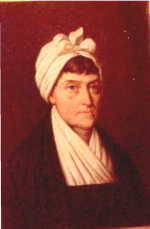
- Born: Maria Isabel Wittenhall; 6 November 1749; Avintes, Portugal
- Died: 5 November 1819 (aged 69); Porto, Portugal
- Citizenship: Portuguese
- Known for: Pioneering use of smallpox vaccinations
- Medical career
- Awards: Portuguese Royal Academy of Sciences Gold Medal

Maria Isabel Wittenhall van Zeller (1749–1819) was a pioneer in the use of vaccination against smallpox in Portugal. She became notable for promoting the use of smallpox vaccination at the beginning of the 19th century, particularly in the Porto area.

== Biography ==
Maria Isabel Wittenhall (sometimes written as Witenhall or Wettenhall) was born in Avintes, in the municipality of Vila Nova de Gaia in Portugal on 6 November 1749 to English emigrant parents. The wine company, Curtis and Wettenhall, was in existence in 1726 and it seems likely her father was a partner in that company, Townsend Wettenhall, who married, Anna Canner, the widow of a Mr. Newell in 1739. On 4 May 1767, at the age of 17, she married Pedro van Zeller (1746-1802), who came from a Dutch Catholic family and served as the Russian Consul in Porto. The couple had three sons.

Van Zeller became notable for promoting the use of smallpox vaccination at the beginning of the 19th century, particularly in the Porto area. For many centuries the disease had been treated by inoculation, also known as variolation, which involved the deliberate introduction of material from smallpox pustules into the skin. This induced immunity to smallpox but generally also produced a mild form of the infection. The Royal Family of Portugal experienced first-hand the results of a failure to inoculate when José, Prince of Brazil died of smallpox at the age of 27 in 1788.

Towards the end of the 18th century, the work of Edward Jenner and others showed that cowpox delivered by vaccination to humans could protect against smallpox. Smallpox vaccination was first introduced into Portugal in 1799. Van Zeller started vaccinating in 1805 on her family farm in Avintes and also at her home in Porto, having been introduced to vaccination by the surgeon José da Cunha. There was considerable suspicion of its use, both by the Church and the medical profession. At one time Van Zeller was arrested for being a curandeira (quack or witch doctor). She appealed to the Royal Academy of Sciences for support and the Academy both successfully defended her and presented her with a gold medal in 1808.

A Vaccine Institute was established in the university city of Coimbra in 1804 although its work was suspended during the Peninsular War and it was only re-established in 1812. Isabel van Zeller was a benefactor of the Institute and regularly sent it a tally of the vaccinations she had carried out. According to its records, she administered 13,408 successful vaccinations between 1805 and 1819, or 18% of the total vaccinations given in Portugal in that period. The Institute awarded her a gold medal in 1813, although this was subject to some controversy because members thought that another woman, Angela Tamagnini, also deserved such a distinction. In the end it was decided to deny Tamagnini the award because she had failed to provide the necessary data.
