= Count of Avintes =

Noble title in the Kingdom of Portugal

Counts of Avintes
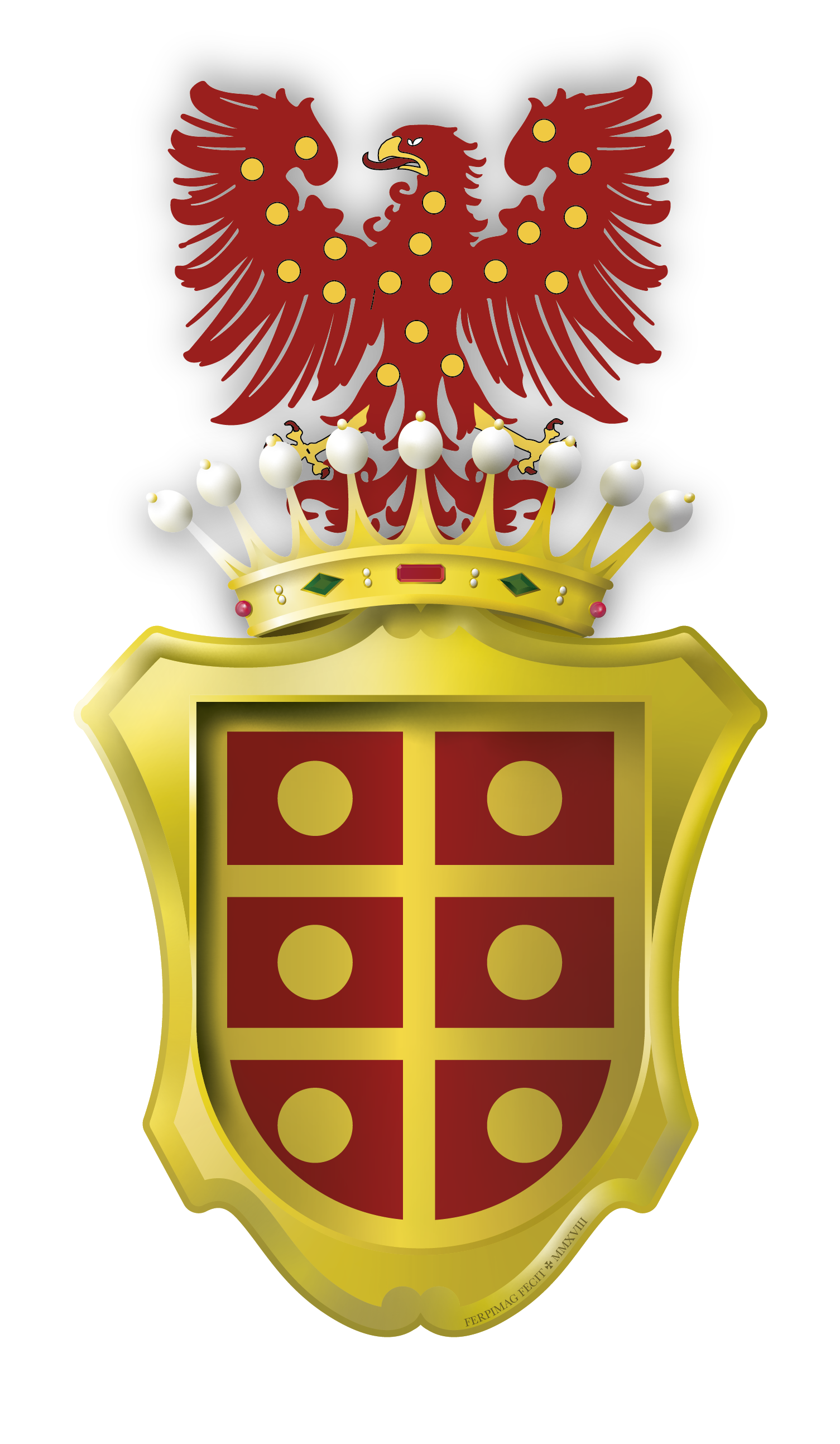
- Coat of Arms of the Counts of Avintes
- Creation date: 17 February 1664
- Created by: King Afonso VI of Portugal
- Peerage: Peerage of Portugal
- First holder: D. Luis de Almeida
- Present holder: D. Luís Maria de Almeida, 13th Count of Avintes
- Heir apparent: D. Jaime de Almeida
- Status: Extant

Count of Avintes is a Portuguese title of nobility created by Letters Patent of King Afonso VI of Portugal on 17 February 1664 for D. Luis de Almeida, 5th Lord of Avintes. The title was conferred in perpetuity (Note: In the original Portuguese: de juro e herdade meaning "in perpetuity and by inheritance", whereby to be inherited a title required no further concession from the Crown or the State, but merely its acknowledgement.) upon the 4th Count by King José I of Portugal in the same document by which he was elevated to the Marquessate of Lavradio, later confirmed by Letters Patent dated 29 August 1766.

== Background ==
It is probable that the ancient Seigniory of Avintes predates the foundation of Portugal itself. It is likely that the Seigniory was passed to the Brandão family in 1487, and in 1505, the Benedictine Monastery of Saint Thyrsus, which had held it since the end of the XIII century, confirmed the Seigniory had been passed to the Brandão family in the person of Fernão Brandão Pereira, Knight Commander of São Martinho de Guilhabreu in the Order of Christ and a nobleman at the Court of King Manuel I. He was appointed chamberlain to Prince Fernando, and was King João III's ambassador to the King of Fez. His heirs would continue to hold important positions at Court.

His granddaughter and heiress, Isabel Brandôa, 3rd Lady of Avintes, married D. Francisco de Almeida, Knight of the Order of Christ, Captain General of the Portuguese enclaves at Ormuz and Diu, Governor of Angola and General of the Armed Forces in Beira Province. Francisco was from an old, noble family with ties to Portugal's royal family, (Note: His ancestor Diogo Fernandes de Almeida, Governor of Abrantes and Lord of Sardoal, had married D. Brites Anes, great-granddaughter of King Pedro I.) and which had reached prominence during the late 14th century. He was a great-grandson of the 2nd Count of Abrantes. His eldest son, D. João de Almeida, nicknamed "O Sábio", (Note: The Wise.) had only one surviving child by his wife D. Jerónima de Castro, also named Isabel, who inherited the Seigniory of Avintes. She married her kinsman, D. Luis de Almeida, 5th Lord of Avintes by marriage and 1st Count of Avintes in his own right.

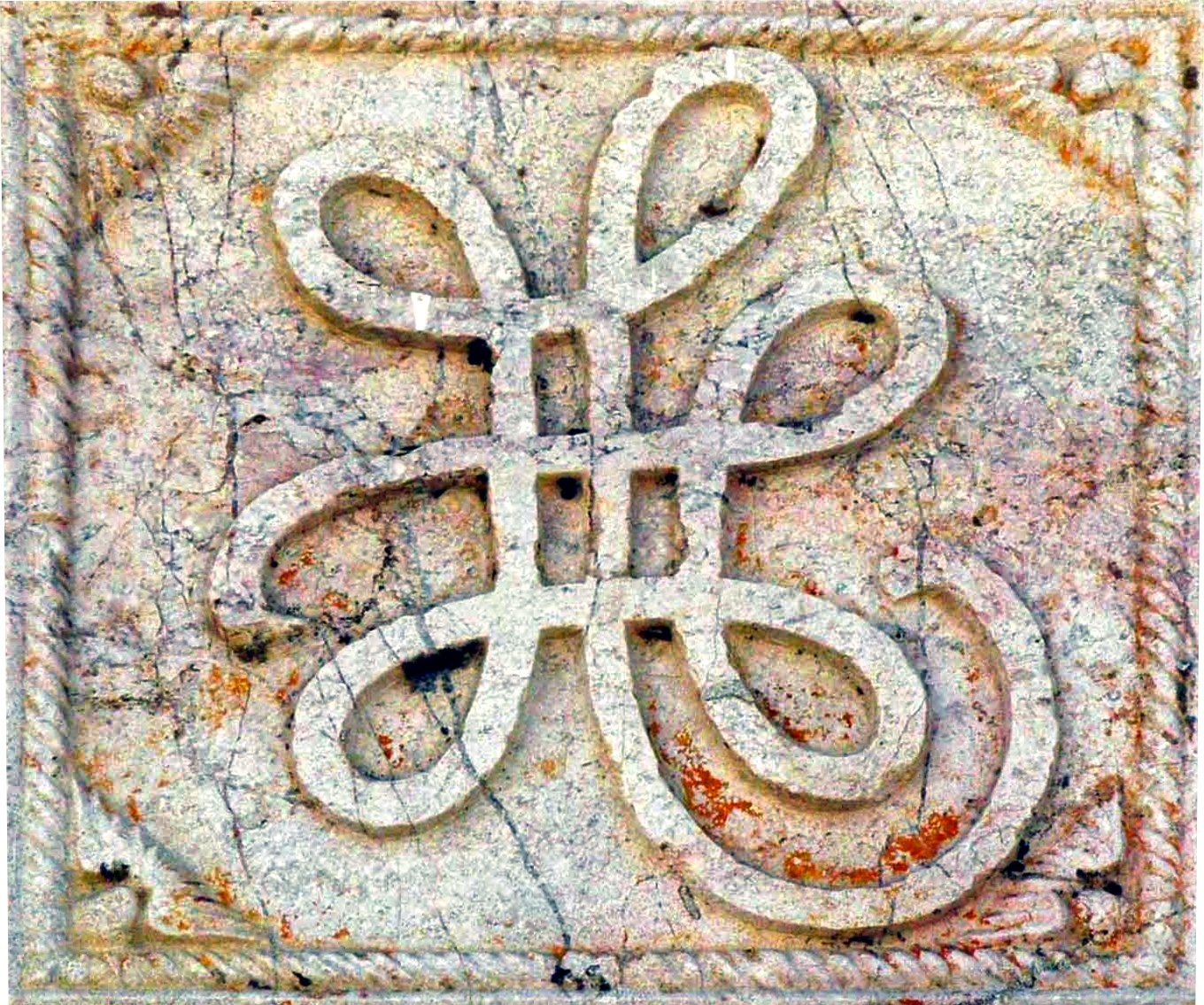
Seal of the 1st Count of Avintes on the regimental depot in the city of Lagos, the then capital of the Algarve. A similar seal can also be found on the regimental saddlery building close by. Both were part of a larger complex built by the Count to support the Lagos infantry units during the War of Acclamation.

Like his wife, D. Luis de Almeida was also descended from the 1st Count of Abrantes but by his second son, D. Diogo Fernandes de Almeida, 6th Prior of Crato. His father, D. António de Almeida, was the head of one of the branches of the important Almeida clan and in addition to his own assets inherited substantial estates from his mother, D. Maria de Portugal, descended from the Counts of Vimioso and the Counts of Castanheira.

Luis acceded to his parents' prosperous estate together with his father's commanderies of São Martinho da Lordosa, Soalheira and Bemposta in the Order of Christ. In 1647 he was posted to Brazil as Mestre de Campo of one of the elite regiments of Royal Marines, (Note: The rank of Mestre de Campo was equivalent to that of a regimental Colonel. D. Luis de Almeida was Mestre de Campo of one of the Terços of the Royal Portuguese Navy. A Terço was an infantry unit, similar to that of a regiment, and the Terços da Armada da Coroa de Portugal were elite infantry units stationed in the navy, equivalent to modern-day fuzileiros or marines, making these Terços the world's third oldest marine corps.) where he served favourably during the War of Acclamation against Spain. He was later Governor General of Rio de Janeiro and, as a trusted courtier of the Queen Regent, D. Luisa de Gusmão, was given the highly sensitive role of last Portuguese Governor General of Tangiers, with the responsibility of managing its transition to English rule in 1662, as part of the dowry of the Infanta Catarina on her betrothal to King Charles II. His experience as a soldier and administrator, as well as his position at Court, earned him the title of 1st Count of Avintes in 1664, during his final administrative posting as Governor General of the Kingdom of the Algarve. He was stationed in Lagos, the then capital of the Algarve, between 1663 and 1667, where he also left his mark.

As well as the Seigniory of Avintes, Isabel added significantly to her husband's already considerable estate. The Treaty of Lisbon in 1668 secured Portugal’s victory over Spain, confirming the independence of its Crown from the Habsburg dynasty. Isabel's mother, Jerónima, was the sole Portuguese heiress of D. João Soares de Alarcão, Marquis of Turcifal and Count of Torres Vedras, through whom the 1st Count of Avintes gained extensive lands in Lisbon, Guarda, Santarém, Torres Novas and Torres Vedras, and the Chiefdom of the Name and Arms of the Portuguese Alarcão family.

By his wife Isabel, Lady of Avintes, he had nine children, the eldest of whom, D. António de Almeida, was his heir and successor.

== Origins and Family History ==
See: Marquessate of Lavradio - Origins and Family History

== Counts of Avintes (1664) ==
1. D. Luís de Almeida (1610—1671), 1st Count of Avintes. Succeeded by his son
2. D. António de Almeida Portugal (1640—1715), 2nd Count of Avintes. Succeeded by his son
3. D. Luís de Almeida Portugal (1669—1730), 3rd Count of Avintes. Succeeded by his son
4. D. António de Almeida Soares de Portugal (1701—1760), 1st Marquess and 1st Count of Lavradio, 4th Count of Avintes, 8th Viceroy of Brasil. Succeeded by his son
5. D. Luís de Almeida Portugal Soares de Alarcão d'Eça e Mello Silva Mascarenhas (1729—1790), 2nd Marquess of Lavradio, 5th Count of Avintes, 11th Viceroy of Brasil. Succeeded by his son
6. D. António Máximo de Almeida Portugal Soares de Alarcão Mello de Castro Ataíde d'Eça Mascarenhas Silva e Lancastre (1756—1833), 3rd Marquess of Lavradio, 6th Count of Avintes. Succeeded by his son
7. D. Luís de Almeida Portugal Soares de Alarcão Mello de Castro Ataíde d'Eça Mascarenhas Silva e Lancastre (1787—1812), 4th Marquess of Lavradio, 7th Count of Avintes. Succeeded by his brother
8. D. António de Almeida Portugal Soares de Alarcão Mello de Castro Ataíde d'Eça Mascarenhas Silva e Lancastre (1794—1874), 5th Marquess of Lavradio, 8th Count of Avintes. Succeeded by his great-grandson
9. D. José Maria do Espírito Santo de Almeida Corrêa de Sá (1874—1945), 6th Marquess of Lavradio, 9th Count of Avintes. Succeeded by his son
10. D. António de Almeida Portugal (1908—1938), 10th Count of Avintes. Succeeded by his brother
11. D. José Luís de Almeida (1912—1966), 7th Marquess of Lavradio, 11th Count of Avintes. Succeeded by his son
12. D. Jaime de Almeida, 8th Marquess of Lavradio, 12th Count of Avintes, 6th Count of Torres Vedras. Succeeded by his son
13. D. Luís Maria de Almeida, 13th Count of Avintes, heir apparent to the Marquess of Lavradio.

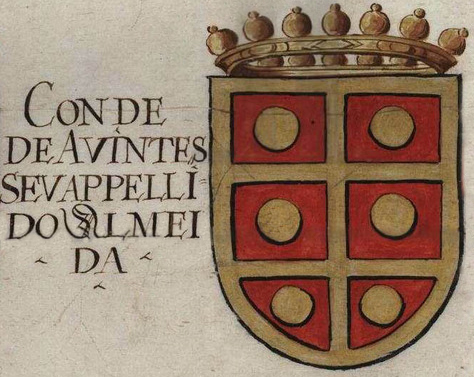
Coat of Arms of the Count of Avintes as depicted in the Thezouro de Nobreza published by Portugal's India King of Arms in 1675

== Coat of Arms ==
See: Marquesses of Lavradio - Coat of Arms

== See also ==
- Marquesses of Lavradio
- Counts of Lavradio
- Counts of Torres Vedras
