= Angela Tamagnini =

Vaccination pioneer and heroine of the Peninsular War in Portugal

- Born: 26 October 1770; Milan, Italy
- Died: 2 July 1827 (aged 56); Tomar, Portugal
- Occupation: Vaccinologist
- Known for: Mediating with French troops to stop invasion of Tomar during the Peninsular War

Angela Tamagnini was a pioneer in the use of smallpox vaccination in Portugal. She also became famous for her role in resisting the French invasion of the city of Tomar in the Santarém District of Portugal during the Napoleonic Wars.

== Biography ==
Angela Tamagnini was born in Milan, Italy on 26 October 1770. She moved to Portugal in 1783 together with her uncle, Inácio Francisco Tamagnini, who became the doctor of Queen Maria I.

In 1795, she married António Florêncio de Abreu e Andrade, son of a rich tobacco and soap trader. Her husband died in 1806. She had one son, João. Her great-grandson was Fernando Tamagnini de Abreu e Silva, the commander of the Portuguese Expeditionary Corps, which fought with the Allies during World War I.

During the Peninsular War, in June 1808, the year after the French invasion of Portugal under General Junot, the Portuguese in the northwest of the country rebelled. French troops led by General Margaron were sent to quell the uprising in Tomar. It was clear that the defence of Tomar would be hopeless and Tamagnini, who knew how to speak French, was asked to act as an intermediary between the city and the French in order to negotiate a peaceful surrender, thereby avoiding potential plundering and other atrocities. She succeeded in avoiding destruction of the city, reducing the reparations expected by the French, and saving the lives of three Portuguese friars who were to be executed.

Together with Maria Isabel Wittenhall van Zeller (1749–1819), who was active in the Porto area of Portugal, Tamagnini was a female pioneer in the use of vaccinations against smallpox. Previously the disease had been treated by inoculation, also known as variolation, which involved the deliberate introduction of material from smallpox pustules into the skin. This induced immunity to smallpox but generally also produced a mild form of the infection. Towards the end of the 18th century, the work of Edward Jenner and others showed that cowpox delivered by vaccination to humans could protect against smallpox. Tamagnini ordered everything necessary for the vaccine’s preparation and application from the United Kingdom, and provided it to the Vaccine Institute established in Coimbra by the Royal Academy of Sciences. She, herself, carried out vaccinations in Tomar at her own expense. Tamagnini was appointed a Correspondent of the Vaccine Institute in 1812 but, unlike Wittenhall van Zeller, was not awarded a Gold Medal by the Institute because she failed to provide the necessary data.

== Death and legacy ==
Tamagnini died in Tomar on 2 July 1827. In Tomar, she is honoured by having one of the city’s major roads named after her.
