= Count of Lavradio =

Noble title in the Kingdom of Portugal

Counts of Lavradio
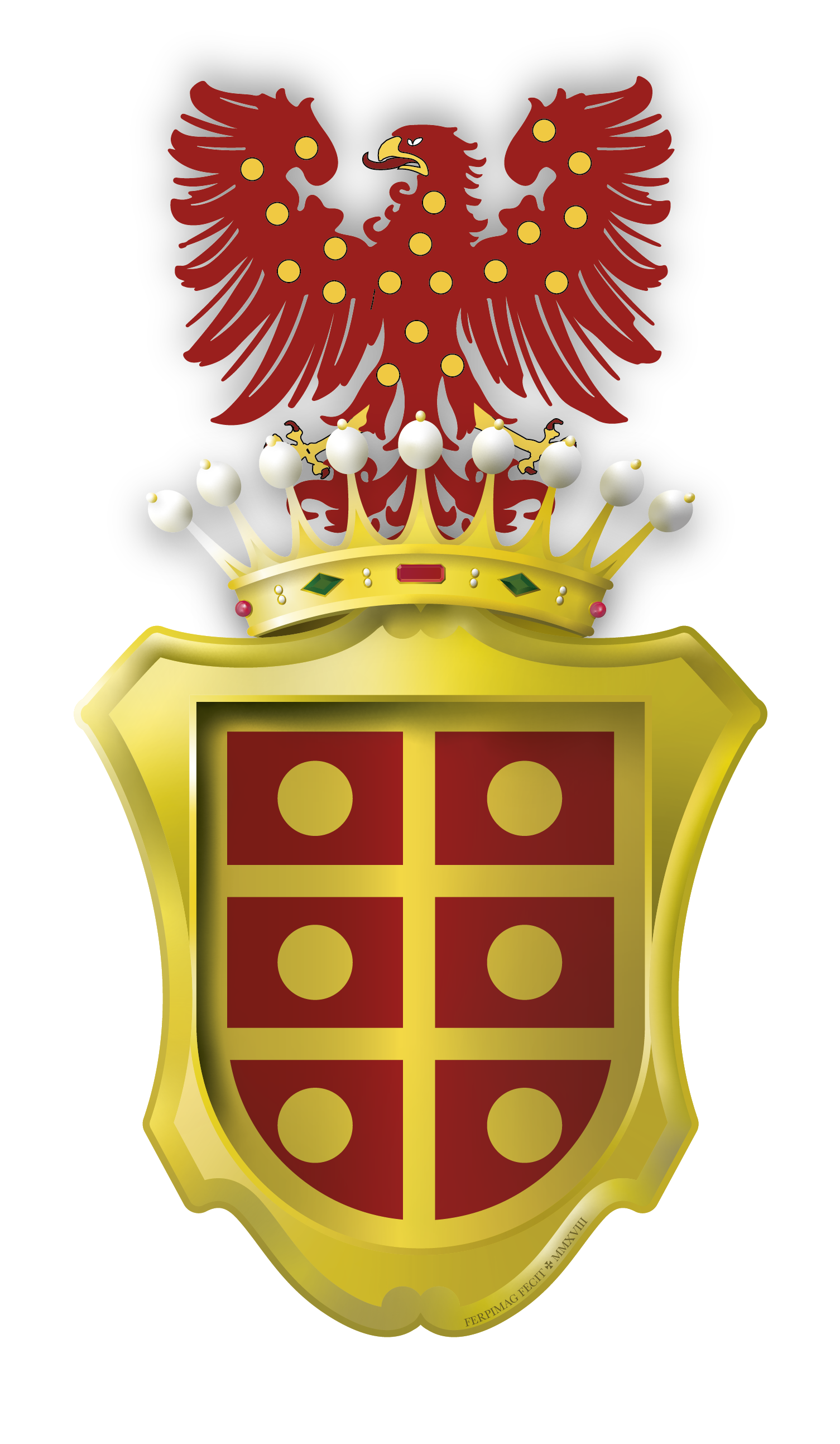
- Coat of Arms of the Counts of Lavradio
- Creation date: 4 June 1725
- Created by: João V of Portugal
- Peerage: Peerage of Portugal
- First holder: D. António de Almeida Soares de Portugal
- Present holder: D. António de Almeida Corrêa de Sá, 5th Count of Lavradio
- Heir apparent: D. Jaime de Almeida, 8th Marquess of Lavradio
- Status: Extant

Count of Lavradio is a Portuguese title of nobility created twice.

The first creation was by King Pedro II of Portugal, by Letters Patent of 16 March 1670, for Luís de Mendonça Furtado e Albuquerque, 1st and only Count of Lavradio. Luís de Mendonça Furtado was a nobleman, distantly related to both the Portuguese and Spanish reigning families, a soldier and statesman, with a distinguished career in India where he was nominated as one of the triumvirate of interim governors in 1661 and later, in 1670, as the 54th Governor and 31st Viceroy of India. He did not marry and died, childless, while returning to Portugal in 1677. It was through his influence that Lavradio, his birthplace on the left bank of the Tagus River, was raised to the category of a town.

The second creation was conferred in perpetuity (Note: In the original Portuguese: de juro e herdade meaning "in perpetuity and by inheritance", whereby to be inherited a title required no further concession from the Crown or the State, but merely its acknowledgement.) by King João V of Portugal for D. António de Almeida Soares de Portugal, together with the Seigniory of Lavradio, on 12 January 1714, registered in the Registo Geral de Mercês (Note: The General Registry of Honours kept in the Torre do Tombo - Portugal's central registry. In this case the creation of the title is registered in page 523 of book 9 of King João V's reign) on 4 June 1725, and confirmed by Letters Patent. The Count was later created the 1st Marquess of Lavradio, and the title of Count of Lavradio has been used as a subsidiary title of the House of Lavradio on four more occasions by younger sons and close relatives of the head of the family with the latter's permission.

== Background ==
See: Marquessate of Lavradio - Background

== Origins and Family History ==
See: Marquessate of Lavradio - Origins and Family History

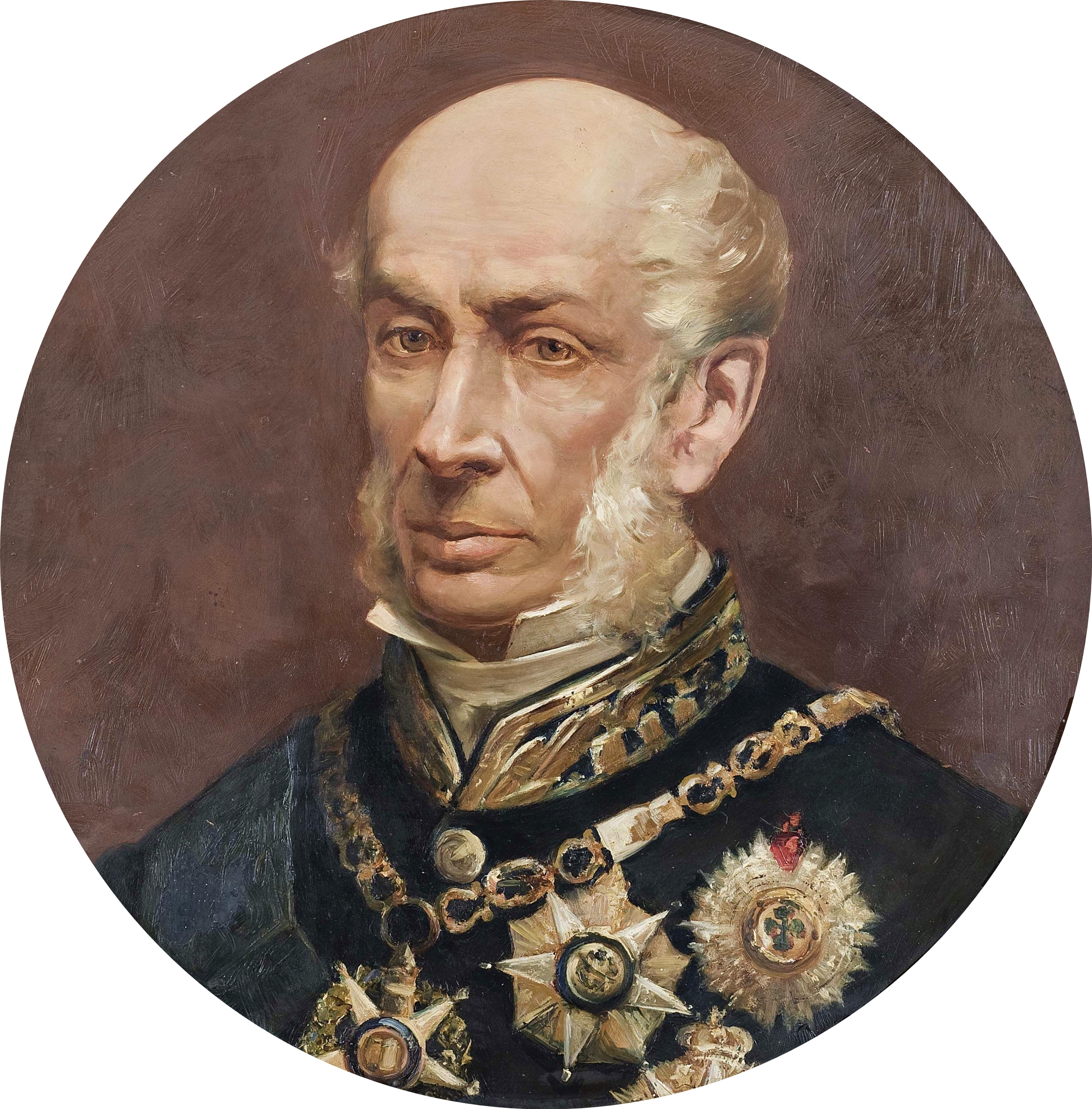
Portrait of the 2nd Count of Lavradio at the Palace of São Bento, which houses Portugal's parliament.

== Counts of Lavradio (1725) ==
1. D. António de Almeida Soares de Portugal (1701—1760), 1st Marquess and 1st Count of Lavradio, 4th Count of Avintes, 8th Viceroy of Brasil.
2. D. Francisco de Almeida Portugal (1787—1870), 2nd Count of Lavradio, Peer of the Realm and Minister of State of Portugal. Younger brother of the 4th and 5th Marquesses of Lavradio.
3. D. Salvador de Almeida Corrêa de Sá (1854—1903), 1st Baron of Paulo Cordeiro by marriage. Second grandson of the 5th Marquess of Lavradio and younger brother to the heir of the House of Lavradio.
4. D. António de Almeida Corrêa de Sá (1879—1965), younger brother of the 6th Marquess of Lavradio.
5. D. António de Almeida Corrêa de Sá (1941), 5th Count of Figueiró. Grandson, respectively, of the 4th Count of Lavradio and 6th Marquess of Lavradio.

== Coat of Arms ==
The Counts of Lavradio use the same arms as those of the Counts of Avintes.

== See also ==
- Marquesses of Lavradio
- Counts of Avintes
- Counts of Torres Vedras
