= Francisco de Moura Rolim =

Brazilian military officer (1580–1657)

Francisco de Moura Rolim, also Francisco Rolim or Francisco Roulim (1580 in Olinda – 1657 in Lisbon) was a Portuguese colonial administrator and a military officer in Brazil. He was born in Olinda, Brazil, in 1580. He was appointed as governor-general of Brazil in 1625 by Matias de Albuquerque. He was succeeded by Diogo Luiz de Oliveira in 1626. He died in Lisbon in 1657.

Preceded by Diogo de Mendonça Furtado	Governor-general of Brazil; 1625–26	Succeeded by Diogo Luís de Oliveira
