= Pereira da Silva =

Pereira da Silva is a Portuguese surname, which may come from the fusion of paternal and maternal names.

Notable people with the name include:

== Pereira da Silva ==
- Manuel Pereira da Silva (1920–2003), Portuguese sculptor

Footballers

- Adriano Pereira da Silva (born 1982), Brazilian footballer
- Carlos Roberto Pereira da Silva (born 1946), Brazilian football coach
- Danilo Pereira da Silva (born 1989), Brazilian footballer
- Elpídio Pereira da Silva Filho (born 1975), Brazilian footballer
- Emerson Pereira da Silva (born 1973), Brazilian footballer
- Everson Pereira da Silva (born 1975), Brazilian footballer
- Fabio Pereira da Silva (born 1990), Brazilian footballer
- Odacir Pereira da Silva ("Itaqui", born 1988), Brazilian footballer
- Luciano José Pereira da Silva (born 1980), Brazilian footballer
- Lucenilde Pereira da Silva ("Lúcio", born 1975), Brazilian footballer
- Michael Anderson Pereira da Silva (born 1983), Brazilian footballer
- Rafael Pereira da Silva (born 1980), Brazilian footballer
- Rafael Pereira da Silva ("Rafael", born 1990), Brazilian footballer
- Ueslei Raimundo Pereira da Silva (born 1972), Brazilian footballer
- Wéverton Pereira da Silva (born 1987), Brazilian footballer

== Silva Pereira ==
- Francisco Xavier da Silva Pereira, Conde das Antas (1793–1852), Portuguese soldier
- Jhonatan da Silva Pereira (born 1989), Brazilian footballer
- João Pedro da Silva Pereira (born 1984), Portuguese footballer
