= Count of Torres Vedras =

Portuguese title of nobility

Counts of Torres Vedras
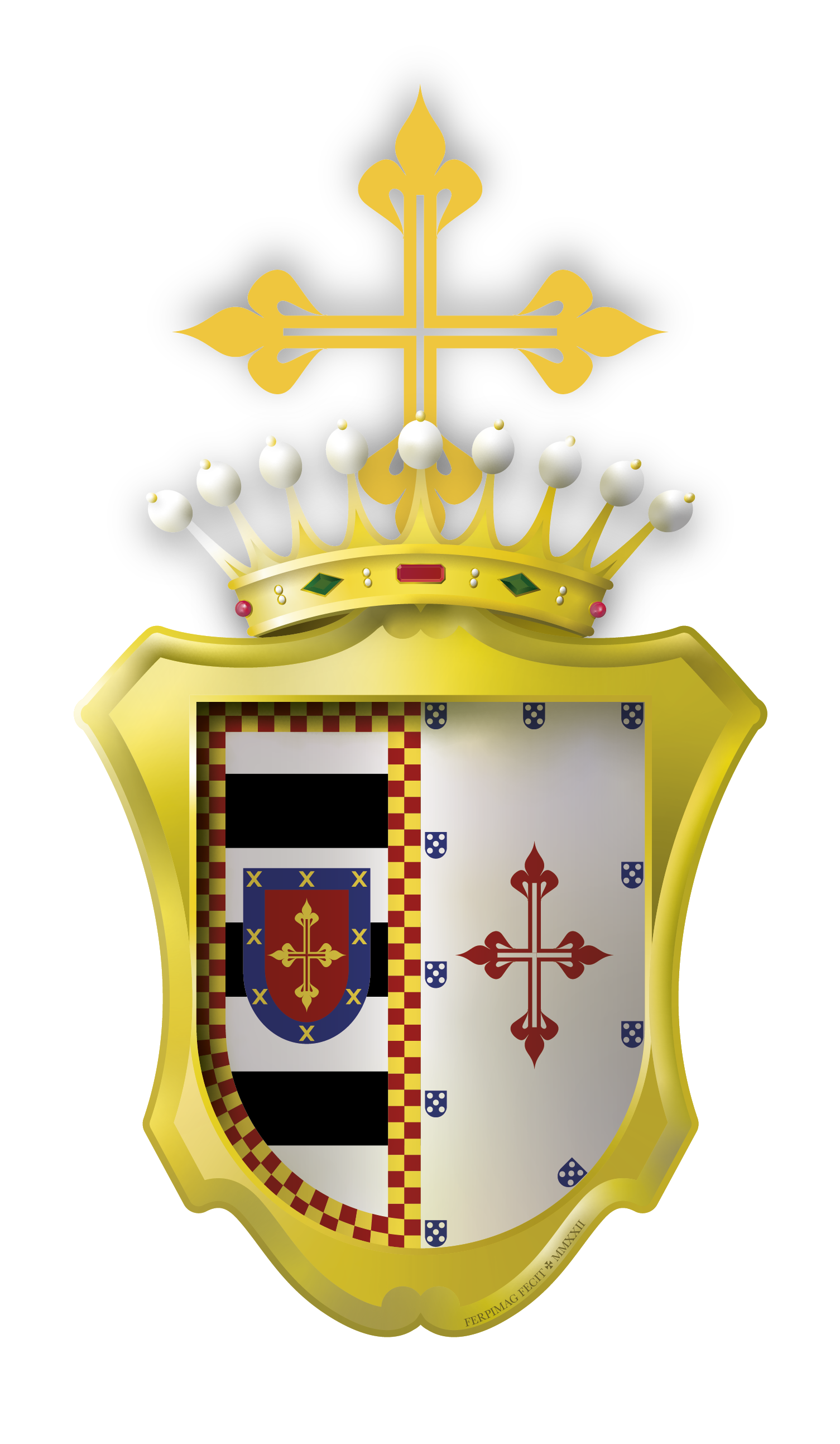
- Coat of Arms of the Counts of Torres Vedras
- Creation date: 1637
- Created by: Filipe III of Portugal
- Peerage: Peerage of Portugal
- First holder: D. João Soares de Alarcão
- Present holder: D. Jaime de Almeida
- Status: Extant

Count of Torres Vedras is a Portuguese title of nobility created by King Felipe III of Portugal (IV of Spain), possibly in 1626 (but verifiably so from 1637), for D. João Soares de Alarcão, 9th Alcaide-mor (Note: The Alcaide-mor was a Crown appointee, in many cases hereditary, given exclusively to the higher ranks of the nobility. The Alcaide-mor was the civic and military Governor of a castle and its town as well as of the surrounding regions. The Alcaide-mor of Torres Vedras was responsible for more than 20 smaller towns and villages in the region of Torres Vedras.) of Torres Vedras and Governor General of the then Portuguese enclave of Ceuta.

There is some evidence that the title of Count of Torres Vedras was already used by his grandfather, D. Martim Soares de Alarcão who, as 6th Alcaide-mor of Torres Vedras, twice held the town for the king against the armies of the pretender D. António, Prior of Crato, bastard son of D. Luis, Duke of Beja, in 1580 and 1589. It is possible that the title had been given to him as a result of this by Felipe I of Portugal (II of Spain), as some authors contend, but no documentary evidence of this seems to have survived. This is reinforced by contemporary sources that designate D. João Soares de Alarcão, 9th Alcaide-mor as the 1st Count.

Furthermore, a title of Count of Torres Vedras, together with the estates comprising the House of Torres Vedras, and then in the possession of the Alcaide-mor, is reported to have been granted in 1580 by D. António to one of his fiercest advocates, Manuel da Silva Coutinho, Fronteiro-mor, (Note: Captain-General of the Frontiers.) in retaliation for D. Martim's defence of the town and his fealty to the king. Manuel da Silva Coutinho was unable to take possession of either and the grant, if it indeed existed or had any legal basis, was never recognised.

== Background ==
The Counts of Torres Vedras were descended from both Spanish and Portuguese Court nobility, the latter with a long relationship to the town of Torres Vedras.

=== Governors of Torres Vedras ===
Born in Torres Vedras, Gomes Martins de Vasconcelos e Alvarenga, Doctor of Law, Chanceler-mor (Note: The Chanceler-mor, or Lord High Chancellor, was one of the Great Officers of State in Portugal, responsible for the Royal Seal, and, by extension, for examining royal dispatches, decrees, and judicial decisions or sentences. The function of Chanceler-mor took precedence over the other key functions of the State, and at times was the de facto chief minister, heading the government on behalf of the King.) of Portugal and Royal Councillor to King João I, married Catarina Teixeira, First Lady of the Bedchamber (Note: The Camareira-mor, or First Lady of the Bedchanber, was the senior Lay-in-Waiting to the Queen.) of the Infanta Isabel, Duchess of Burgundy, whose family also hailed from Torres Vedras. Her father, Estevão Pires, had been Alcaide-mor of Torres Vedras until 1382. Gomes Martins and Catarina had only one son, Rui Gomes de Alvarenga, Count Palatine, President of the Royal Council of King Duarte and King Afonso V, Ambassador to Castile and, like his father, Doctor of Law and Chanceler-mor of Portugal. He received a large estate from his parents, to which he added significantly, particularly in and around Torres Vedras, and on the basis of which he established a morgadio. (Note: The morgadio was similar to the common law entail or fee tail in England, or the majorat in France.) He was given the civic and military governorship of Torres Vedras that had been his maternal grandfather's and that would be later passed on to his eldest son and to his descendants.

Rui Gomes de Alvarenga married Mécia Soares de Melo, daughter of Estevão Soares de Melo, 6th Lord of Melo and Governor General of Ceuta, with whom he had a number of children including Lopo Soares de Alvarenga, 3rd Governor of India. Following the death of Rui Gomes de Alvarenga in 1475, their eldest son, Gomes Soares de Melo, inherited the lion's share of his parents' estate, becoming 2nd administrator of the Morgadio of Torres Vedras. He was later confirmed as Alcaide-mor of Torres Vedras, a position which became effectively hereditary in his family, and served as Reposteiro-mor (Note: A senior Court official, and one of only four appointed to the King's private chamber, a position reserved for members of the highest nobility.) of King Afonso V. His brother Fernão de Melo was given the estates of Vila de Rei and Val de Cavalos in Santarém acquired by their father, which Fernão established as a new morgadio, the Morgadio of Vila de Rei.

The universal heir of Gomes Soares de Melo and his wife D. Filipa de Castro was their only child, D. Margarida Soares de Alvarenga, Lady-in-Waiting to Queen Maria, who also inherited her uncle's morgadio. She married the Castilian nobleman D. Juan de Alarcón, son of the Lords of Valverde, who had come to Portugal in 1500 with his mother, D. Elvira de Mendoza, who was First Lady of the Bedchamber to Queen Maria, Infanta of Spain, on her marriage to King Manuel I of Portugal.

D. Juan de Alarcón, was Caçador-mor (Note: The Caçador-mor, Chief Huntsman or Master of the Hunt, was one of the more important offices of the Crown.) to King Manuel and to King John III and, by marriage, 3rd Alcaide-mor of Torres Vedras, 3rd Morgado of Torres Vedras and Vila de Rei. In the early 1500s, D. Juan was responsible for building a significant new palace within the Torres Vedras castle walls, while King Manuel financed an extensive reconstruction, including the latest defensive upgrades and the reinforcement of the castle itself. These incorporated designs and mechanisms developed for the first time in 1490 by Leonardo da Vinci and introduced into Portugal with the reconstruction of the castle of Torres Vedras. The decision to undertake such a large-scale construction would prove to be fortuitous for Juan de Alarcón's descendants.

It is from this marriage that the Soares de Alarcão family name originates, a name which was perpetuated by the couple's senior line of descent until the death of D. António Maria Brás da Paixão de Almeida Portugal Corrêa de Sá Soares de Alarcão d'Eça e Mello Castro Ataíde Pereira Mascarenhas Silva e Lancastre, father of the 9th Count of Avintes and 6th Marquess of Lavradio.

D. Martinho Soares de Alarcão, D. João Soares de Alarcão and D. Martim Soares de Alarcão were respectively son, grandson and great-grandson of D. Juan and successively 4th, 5th and 6th Alcaides-mores of Torres Vedras. The latter, also 6th Morgado of Torres Vedras and Vila de Rei, played a key role during the crisis of 1580 in his defence of the town of Torres Vedras.

=== Marriage Alliances and Succession ===
The House of Torres Vedras grew in stature and wealth over time with a number of favourable marriage alliances, most with members of Portugal's most eminent nobility, much of which highly placed in Court and in many cases interrelated with the Portuguese royal family. Three marriages that would add significantly to the wealth and importance of the House of Torres Vedras are of note. The 6th Alcaide-mor of Torres Vedras married D. Cecilia de Mendoza Aguilar y Lugo, the only daughter and heiress of Felipe de Aguilar, Mestre-sala (Note: The Mestre-sala, literally the Master of the Hall, was another of the Great Officers of State in Portugal, responsible for organizing and managing all official ceremonies and feasts and reported only to the Mordomo-mor, Portugal's premier Officer of State, the Lord High Steward. He was the State Master of Ceremonies and Head of Protocol.) to the King, and a knight of the Order of Christ with the commandery of São Pedro de Torres Vedras. He had come to Portugal from Spain in 1525 with his grandmother, D. Maria de Velasco, First Lady of the Bedchamber to Queen Catarina, wife of King João III. Felipe de Aguilar had inherited a morgadio established by his father in Portugal, headed by a sumptuous chapel in the old church of Santa Catarina do Monte Sinai in Lisbon, as well as the morgadio of Lugo, from his mother, D. Ana de Lugo. As a result, D. Martim Soares de Alarcão was able to add these benefices and estates to his already considerable patrimony.

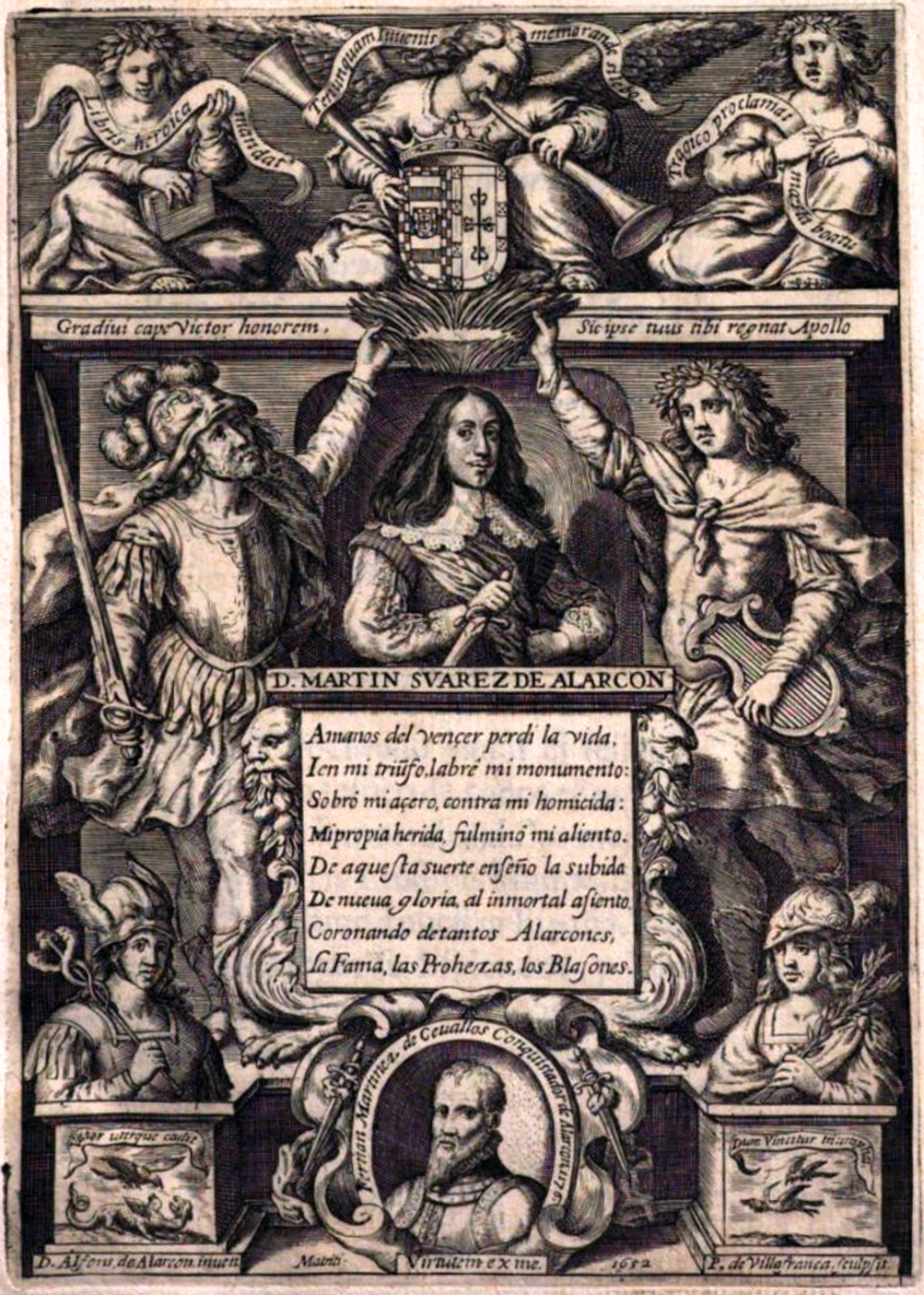
Engraving from "Corona Sepulcral. Elogios En La Muerte De Don Martin Suarez de Alarcon", showing the Soares de Alarcão coat of arms, and portraits of the heir to the House of Torres Vedras, who had died heroically in battle in 1652, and of Fernán Martínez de Cevallos, conqueror of the castle of Alarcón in 1176 who instituted the Alarcón lineage.

His son and heir, D. João Soares de Alarcão, Mestre-sala, Knight Commander of the Order of Christ, 7th Alcaide-mor of Torres Vedras - and a noted author - married D. Isabel de Castro e Vilhena, sister of the illustrious Marquess of Montalvão, D. Jorge Mascarenhas, 1st Viceroy of Brazil. Despite the latter's five children, his family's loyalties were divided by the Restoration of 1640, and his descent was extinguished with the death of his homonymous grandson, the 2nd Count of Serém, 11th and last Marshal of Portugal. As a result, a large part of his extensive estate was inherited through the line of his sister, and only sibling, Isabel, wife of the Alcaide-mor of Torres Vedras.

Their eldest son D. Martinho, 8th Alcaide-mor of Torres Vedras, served the king loyally in the Portuguesa navy and in Portuguese enclaves of Mazagan and Tangiers, but died aged 21 in 1623, did not marry and had no issue. The House of Torres Vedras was inherited by their second son, D. João Soares de Alarcão, 1st Count of Torres Vedras, who married the heiress of the important morgadio of Eça, D. Maria de Noronha e Eça. Through these marriages, the House of Torres Vedras gained a number of morgadios, commanderies in the Order of Christ, the role of Mestre-sala and other titles and benefices.

D. João Soares de Alarcão, confirmed as Count of Torres Vedras by King Felipe III of Portugal (IV of Spain), chose to honour his fealty to the Habsburg monarch, rather than pledge allegiance to King John IV, during the crisis of 1640. He was named Governor General of Ceuta and on his way to take up his position in 1642 confirmed his allegiance to Felipe IV, together with most of his family. Ceuta was the only Portuguese territory to have chosen the King of Spain's jurisdiction. In thanks for his fealty and his service in Ceuta, and to honour his son and heir, D. Martinho, who died heroically while taking the fortress of San Juan de los Reyes in Montjuic during the Siege of Barcelona in 1652, Felipe IV granted him the title of Marquess of Turcifal that same year.

Considered a traitor in Portuguese eyes, all the benefices and the estate of the Count in Portugal were confiscated by the Portuguese Crown. The confiscation of the assets was contested by the Portuguese nobleman D. Luis de Almeida, 1st Count of Avintes, on behalf of his wife, D. Isabel de Castro, the oldest surviving grandchild of the 7th Alcaide-mor of Torres Vedras still loyal to the Portuguese Crown. The sentence was judged in favour of their eldest son and heir, the 2nd Count of Avintes in 1676, and later confirmed following the death in 1712 in Spain, without issue, of the 5th Count of Torres Vedras and the extinction of the Spanish line of the Soares de Alarcão family.

== Counts of Torres Vedras (1637) ==
The numbering of the title below is based on its first verified use in the 1630s. (Note: Official letters from Felipe III of Portugal to D. João Soares de Alarcão as Count of Torres Vedras in 1637, 1639 and 1640.)

1. D. João Soares de Alarcão (1607—1669), 9th Alcaide-mor of Torres Vedras, 1st Count of Torres Vedras, 1st Marquess of Turcifal. Succeeded by his son
2. D. Antonio Suarez de Alarcón, 2nd Count of Torres Vedras, 2nd Marquess of Turcifal, Succeeded by his sister
3. D. Maria de Alarcón, 3rd Countess of Torres Vedras, 3rd Marchioness of Turcifal, Succeeded by her son
4. D. Antonio de Bracamonte y Alarcón (d.1684), 4th Count of Torres Vedras. Who died before his parents, succeeded by his son
5. D. Luis Rubin de Bracamonte y Dávila (1684—1712), 5th Count of Torres Vedras, 4th Marquess of Turcifal and 3rd Marquess of Fuente el Sol, who died without issue; succeeded by the tenth-great-grandnephew of the 1st Count
6. D. Jaime de Almeida, 6th Count of Torres Vedras, 8th Marquess of Lavradio and 12th Count of Avintes.

== Marquesses of Turcifal (1652) ==
The title of Marquess of Turcifal was given to the 1st Count of Torres Vedras by Felipe IV of Spain in 1652, during the Portuguese War of Independence. The title had no official recognition in Portugal since Felipe was no longer de facto King of Portugal, neither was it recognised as a Spanish title since it was conferred by Felipe as titular King of Portugal, not in his position as King of Spain. Nevertheless, the title was used by D. João Soares de Alarcão and his descendants until his line was extinguished and is claimed by the Marquesses of Lavradio, who are Chiefs of the Name and Arms of the Alarcão family in Portugal, hold the title of Count of Torres Vedras and are the current representatives of the Marquesses of Turcifal.

== Coat of Arms ==
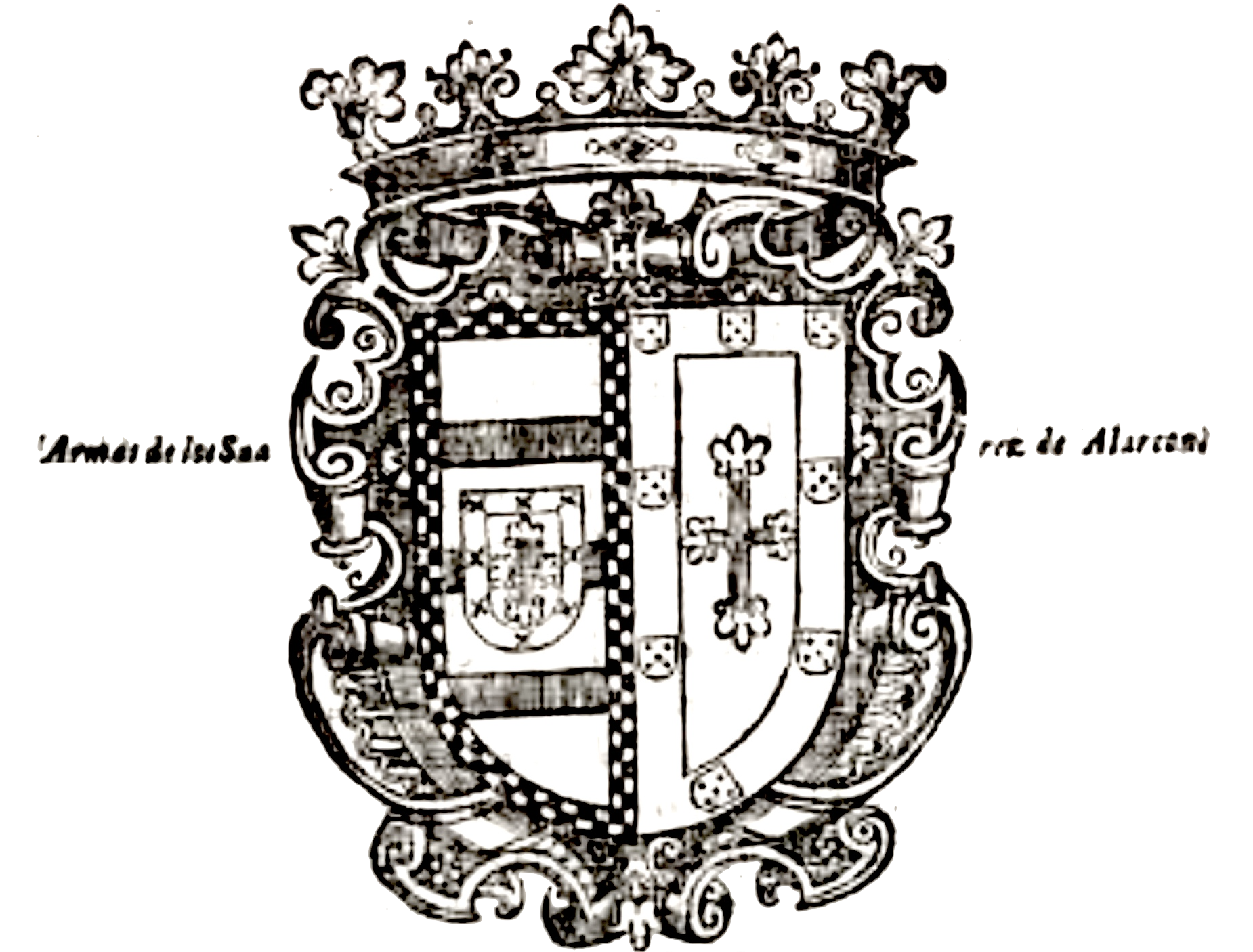
The arms of the Counts of Torres Vedras, Marquesses of Turcifal from a genealogical and historical treatise by D. Antonio Suarez de Alarcón, 1656.

The Counts of Torres Vedras used the arms of the Spanish Alarcón family, as used by the Lords of Valverde, impaled with those of the Soares de Albergaria lineage in Portugal.

- Shield: Per pale 1 - barry of seven Argent and Sable, an escutcheon Gules with a cross fleury voided Or with a bordure Azure with eight saltires couped Or, a bordure chequy Gules and Or (for Zevallos de Alarcón); 2 - Argent a cross fleury voided Gules, embordured of the first with ten escutcheons Azure each with five roundels placed saltirewise Argent (for Soares de Albergaria).
- Coronet: the shield is surmounted by the coronet of a marquess.
- Crest: a cross fleury voided Or.

== See also ==
- Marquesses of Lavradio
- Counts of Avintes
- Counts of Lavradio
