= Marquess of Lavradio =

Portuguese title of nobility

Marquesses of Lavradio
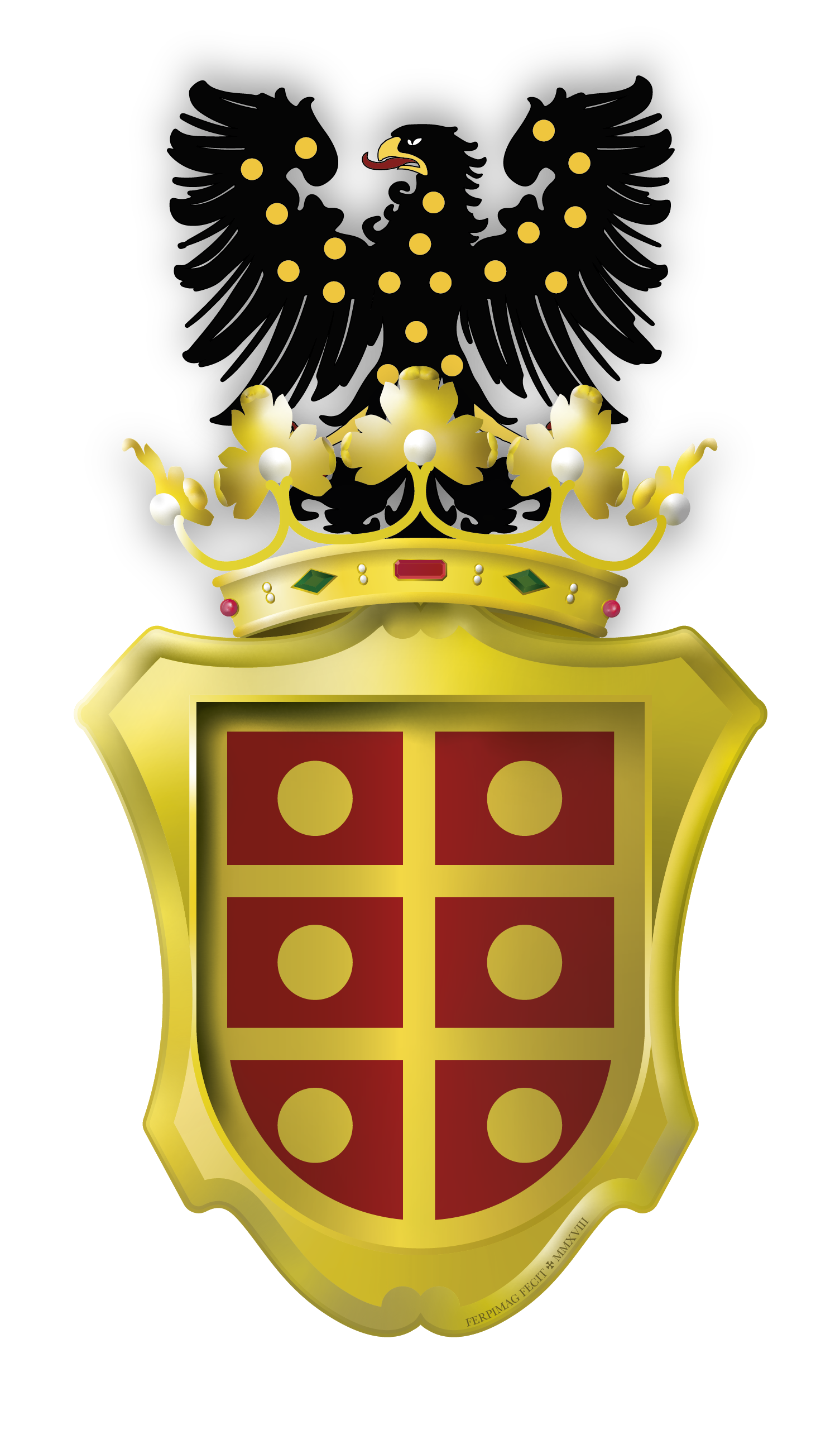
- Coat of Arms of the Marquesses of Lavradio
- Creation date: 18 October 1753
- Created by: José I of Portugal
- Peerage: Peerage of Portugal
- First holder: D. António de Almeida Soares de Portugal
- Present holder: D. Jaime de Almeida, 8th Marquess of Lavradio
- Heir apparent: D. Luís Maria de Almeida, 13th Count of Avintes
- Subsidiary titles: Count of Avintes; Count of Lavradio
- Status: Extant
- Motto: Desir de Bien Faire

Marquess of Lavradio is a Portuguese title of nobility created by Letters Patent of King José I of Portugal on 18 October 1753 for D. António de Almeida Soares de Portugal, 1st Count of Lavradio and 4th Count of Avintes.

== Titles ==
The first Marquess of Lavradio was a prominent statesman and the head of an established noble family. In his own right, he was the 4th Count of Avintes, and 8th Lord of Avintes, also Portuguese titles of nobility. In gratitude for the exceptional services to his country of his uncle D. Tomás de Almeida, 1st Cardinal Patriarch of Lisbon, on 12 January 1714 King John V of Portugal conferred on him the Seigniory of Lavradio, and the title of Count of Lavradio, in perpetuity, (Note: In the original Portuguese: de juro e herdade meaning "in perpetuity and by inheritance", whereby to be inherited a title required no further concession from the Crown or the State, but merely its acknowledgement.) confirmed by Letters Patent of 4 June 1725, as well as adding to his commanderies in the Order of Christ. The first Marquess held key administrative positions under kings João V of Portugal and José I of Portugal, notably as 38th Governor General of Angola, from 1748 to 1753, in recognition of which he was elevated to the marquessate, and, albeit briefly, as 8th Viceroy of Brazil in 1760. He married D. Francisca das Chagas Mascarenhas, (Note: She was the sister of the 4th and 5th Marquesses of Gouvêa, the latter also 8th Duke of Aveiro, whose children left no legitimate descent. As a result, her grandson, António, 3rd Marquess of Lavradio also became head of the Houses of Aveiro, Gouvêa and Santa Cruz upon his cousin's death.) daughter of D. Martinho Mascarenhas, 3rd Marquess of Gouvêa and 6th Count of Santa Cruz, and his wife. D. Maria Rosa de Távora. She died six years later in childbirth, having borne five children.

Their eldest son, the 2nd Marquess and 11th Viceroy of Brasil, like his father, was arguably one of the most remarkable and respected colonial administrators in Brasil. Having followed a successful army career, becoming colonel of the Cascais Regiment and rising to the rank of Brigadier during the war of 1762, he was given the governorship of the province of Bahia and was soon after promoted to Governor General of Rio de Janeiro and Viceroy of Brasil. He had 12 children by his wife, D. Maria Ana da Cunha, daughter of the 5th Counts of São Vicente.

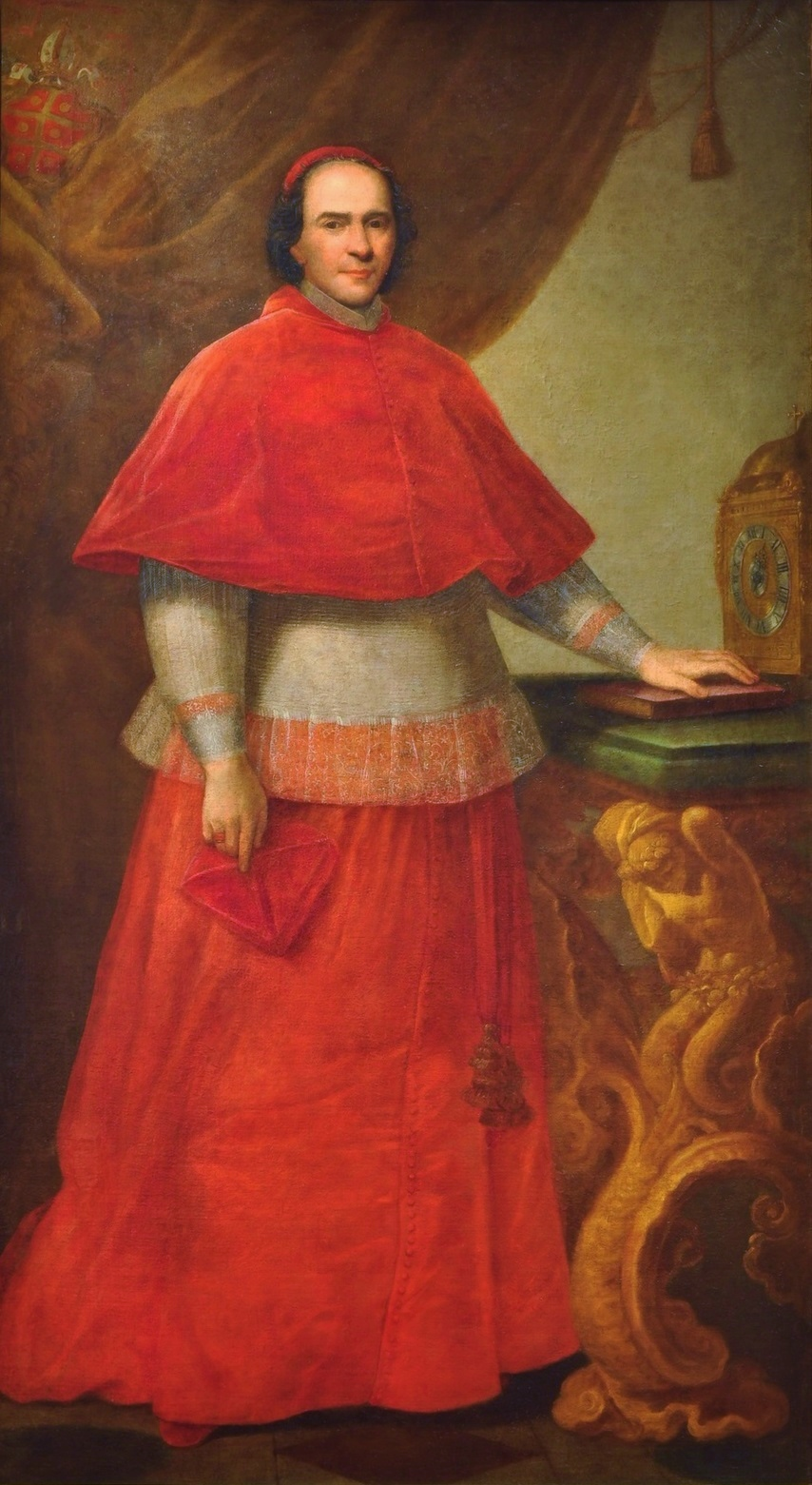
Domenico Duprà's full-length portrait of D. Tomás de Almeida, 1st Cardinal-Patriarch of Lisbon

The 3rd Marquess of Lavradio, as well as inheriting the assets that were not confiscated by the Crown from his great-uncle, the 8th Duke of Aveiro, was granted the hereditary distinction of Honras de Parente d'El Rei (Note: The title of Honras de Parente, meaning "Kinsman to the King", is an acknowledgement of the blood relationship between the title holder and the Crown. Until the end of the monarchy in 1910 it had been granted to only 12 families in Portugal.) by Letters Patent of 1 June 1810, upon his becoming head of the two extant Lancastre lineages: one a legitimate bloodline of the Royal House of Aviz, who were Comendadores-mores (Note: Comendador-mor translates as Knight-Commander-in-Chief. It was the title given to the most senior knight in the order, second only to the Master of the Order.) of the Order of Christ; the other of the Dukes of Aveiro, descended from the illegitimate and only surviving son of King João II, D. Jorge, Duke of Coimbra.

In addition to holding the titles of Count of Avintes, Count of Lavradio and Count of Torres Vedras, the Marquesses of Lavradio are Chiefs of the Name and Arms of the Lancastre, Mascarenhas and Alarcão lineages in Portugal, and head of the noble houses of Aveiro, Gouvêa, Portalegre, Santa Cruz, Montalvão and Turcifal, and thus claimants to the titles of Duque of Aveiro, Duque and Marquess of Torres Novas, Marquess of Gouvêa, Marquess of Montalvão, Count of Portalegre, Count of Santa Cruz, Count of Castelo Novo and Count of Serém. They also represent the title of Marquess of Turcifal, a Portuguese title of nobility given to the Count of Torres Vedras by Felipe IV of Spain in 1652, during the Portuguese War of Independence.

The lengthy surname used by the Marquesses of Lavradio underlines their position as Chiefs of various lineages, as well as their legal obligation as administrators of various morgadios, (Note: The morgadio was similar to the common law entail or fee tail in England, or the majorat in France.) many of which inherited by marriage and subject to the use of the founder's surname. In fact, in addition to the successive honours and positions earned by the House of Lavradio through continuous service of the family to the Crown, its patrimony would extend to all regions of Portugal, except the Algarve, covering a significant part of Portuguese territory by way of marital alliances.

The title of Count of Avintes, which was granted to the 4th Count and his descendants in perpetuity, is assumed at birth by the eldest son and heir of the Marquess of Lavradio. The title of Count of Lavradio has been used on four more occasions by younger sons and close relatives of the head of the family with the latter's permission.

== Origins and family history ==
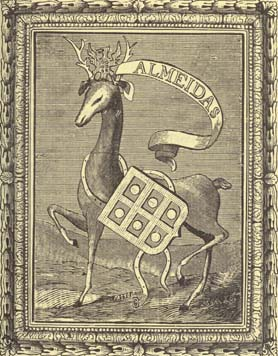
The arms of Almeida from Anselmo Braamcamp Freire's "Salões da Sala de Sintra"

The Marquesses of Lavradio are chiefs of one of the branches of the Almeida family of Portugal, whose noble origins and genealogy are described in detail in all Portuguese nobiliaries, notably "História Genealógica da Casa Real Portuguesa" and "Memórias Históricas e Genealógicas dos Grandes de Portugal", both by D. António Caetano de Sousa, and "Brasões da Sala de Sintra", by Anselmo Braamcamp Freire. The Almeida family has become one of the most prominent among Portuguese nobility. In addition to that of the Marquesses of Lavradio, its other main branches also achieved social and political prominence, including the senior line, headed by the Counts, and later Marquesses of Abrantes, and that of the Counts of Assumar, later Marquesses of Alorna.

=== Almeida family origins ===
Given the family's antiquity, its elevated status and influence on Portugal's history, and the scarcity of reliable documentary proof until the late 14th century, genealogists have traced a number of possible ascendencies for the Almeidas. In his Chronica de Cister, Friar Bernardo de Brito, later copied by many respected genealogists, traces the Almeidas to Pelayo Amado, a 12th-century nobleman, whose grandson, Payo Guterres, took the castle of Almeida from the Moors, gaining the nickname "O Almeidão". Braamcamp Freire, however, suggests Fernão Canelas, owner of the estates of Pinheiro and Canelas near Mangualde in the latter part of the 12th century, as a more probable instigator of this lineage. His son, João Fernandes, founded the village of Almeida, from where he took his surname. Manuel Abranches Soveral picks up on the similarities described by Braamcamp Freire of the Almeida coat of arms to that of the Mello family, whose ascendency is well documented, and suggests a likely alliance by marriage early in the 13th century.

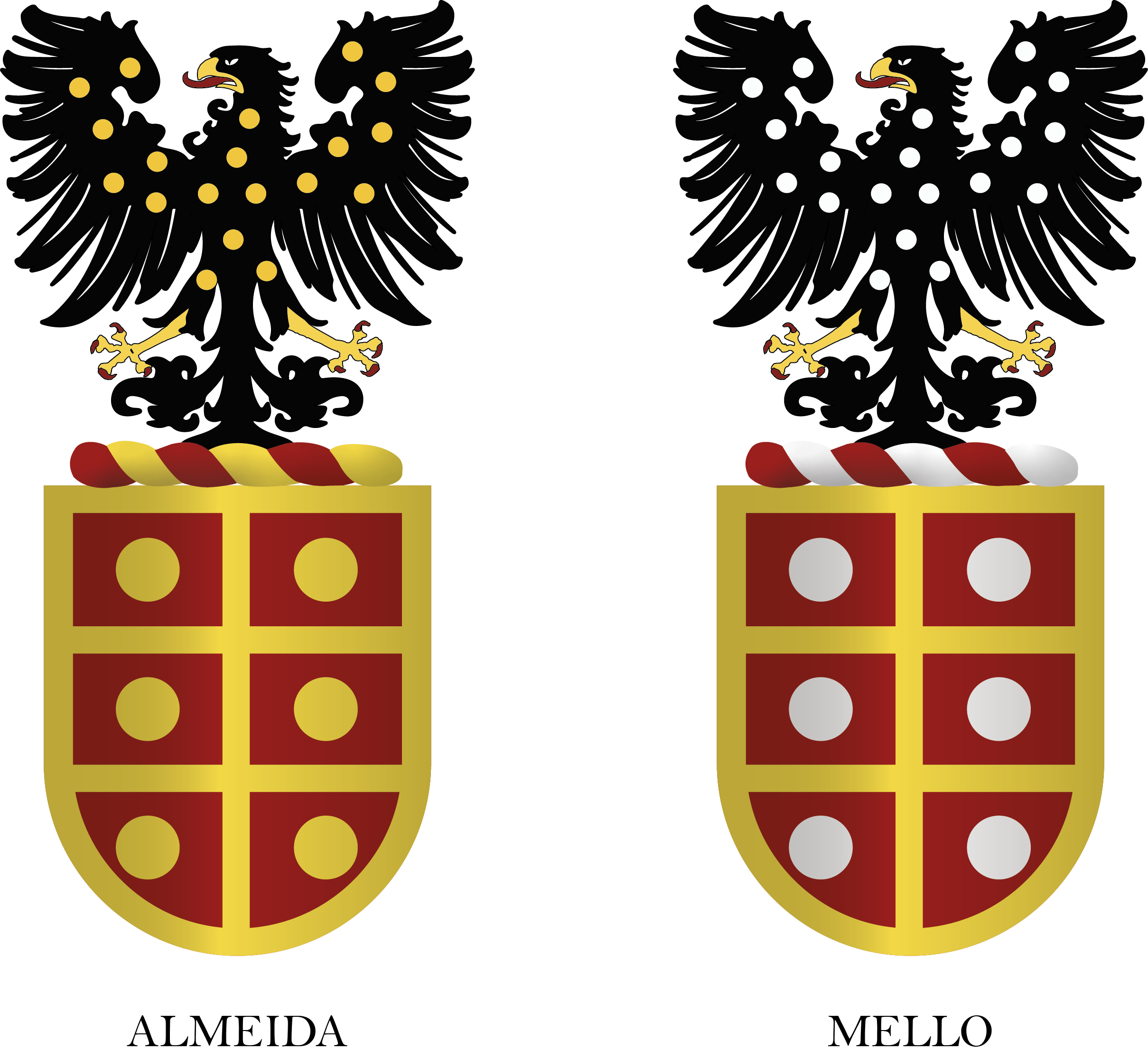
Coats of arms of the Almeida and Mello families

=== Counts of Abrantes ===
By the end of the 14th century, the Almeida clan had established itself amongst the highest levels of Portuguese nobility largely as a result of their proximity to King John I, a relationship with the royal family that would endure for centuries. Fernão Álvares de Almeida, a knight of the Order of Aviz and its Claveiro, (Note: The master of the keys of the order, with responsibility for its treasury. It was a senior role in the order which encompassed the administration of its finances.) who held two important commanderies in the order, sat on the Royal Council of King João I and was his Vedor da Fazenda (Note: The Vedor da Fazenda was responsible for administrating the country's economy and finances, similar to the position of Chancellor of the Exchequer.) and tutor to his children, the Infantes. In 1400 he was named Governor of Abrantes. His son, Diogo Fernandes de Almeida, was King Duarte's Vedor da Fazenda and as Reposteiro-mor, (Note: One of four key officials of the King's private chamber, a position reserved for the nobility.) one of the most senior Court officials. He became Governor of Abrantes, following the death of his father, and was granted the Seigniory of Sardoal. He married D. Brites Anes, granddaughter of Prince João of Portugal, Duke of Valencia de Campos. Their son, D. Lopo de Almeida, fourth cousin to King Afonso V, was created Count of Abrantes by Royal Decree of 13 June 1476.

The 1st Count of Abrantes married D. Brites da Silva, lady-in-waiting to Queen Leonor. They had an illustrious progeny, which included:

- D. João de Almeida (d.1512), 2nd Count of Abrantes, adviser to King João II and his Guarda-mor; (Note: Captain-General of the King's Guard.)
- D. Diogo Fernandes de Almeida (d.1508), Governor of Torres Novas, Monteiro-mor (Note: Master of the King's Horse.) and 6th Prior of Crato;
- D. Jorge de Almeida (d.1543), 37th Bishop of Coimbra and 2nd Count of Arganil;
- D. Pedro da Silva, who took his mother's surname, Comendador-mor of the Order of Aviz and one of King João II's ambassadors to Rome;
- D. Fernando de Almeida (d.1500), Bishop of Ceuta. Was Pope Alexander VI's Apostolic Nuncio to France and was appointed Bishop of Nevers, as well as ambassador to Rome with his brother;
- D. Francisco de Almeida (d.1510), 1st Viceroy of India.

The branch of the Almeida family currently headed by the Marquesses of Lavradio was occasioned by D. Diogo Fernandes de Almeida, Prior of Crato, but later intermarried with the descendants of two of his siblings: D. João, 2nd Count of Abrantes, and D. Francisco, Viceroy of India.

Gilded Flamboyant Gothic style retable of the main altar of the Old Cathedral of Coimbra, part of the extensive decorative overhaul sponsored by the Bishop of Coimbra, D. Jorge de Almeida, whose coat of arms can be seen below the crucified Christ and the image of Our Lady of the Assumption

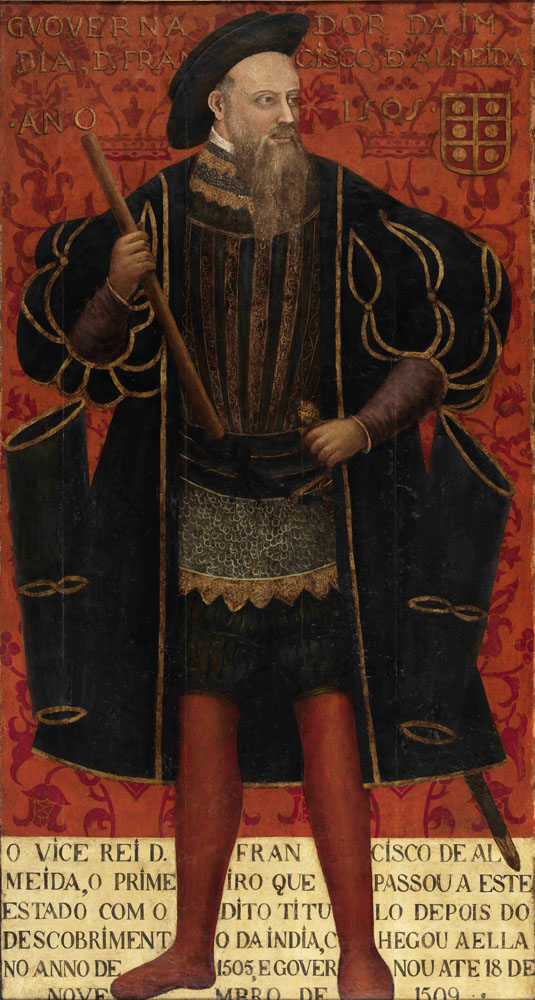
Full-length portrait of Portugal's 1st Viceroy of India, D. Francisco de Almeida

== Palace of Santa Clara ==
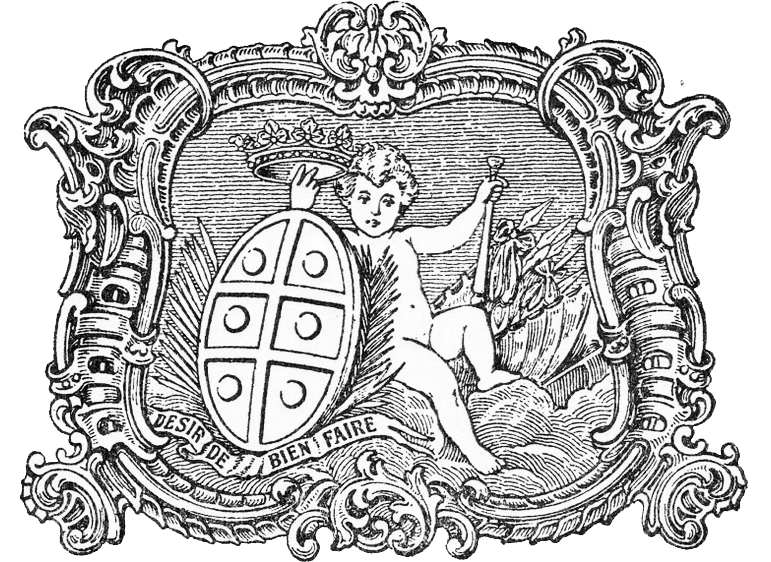
Lithograph, from an ex-Libris of the Marquesses of Lavradio, commissioned by the 6th Marquess, showing the Almeida arms, ducal coronet and motto.

One of the family's morgadios was instituted by D. Ana Henriques on 21 July 1587 for her nephew, D. Luis de Almeida, grandfather to the future 1st Count of Avintes. D. Ana was the daughter of D. Lopo de Almeida, Captain General of Sofala, and granddaughter of D. Diogo Fernandes de Almeida, Prior of Crato. She did not marry and died childless. This morgadio encompassed a number of assets, including buildings and land in the Campo de Santa Clara adjacent, or formerly belonging to the Infanta D. Maria, daughter of King Manuel I. The Almeida family had already established its base in the city in the Campo de Santa Clara by 1619, and it would be a great-great-grandson of D. Luis de Almeida, 1st administrator of the Morgadio of Santa Clara, who would effect the changes that are still visible today.

D. Tomás de Almeida, first Cardinal Patriarch of Lisbon, acquired the land from his brother, the 3rd Count of Avintes, razing the existing buildings and building a sumptuous 18th century palace, which he then presented to his nephew, D. António de Almeida Soares de Portugal, 4th Count of Avintes and later 8th Viceroy of Brasil and 1st Marquis of Lavradio. The palace was built by German architect João Frederico Ludovice, with construction beginning in 1745. Its architecture is unique in that its focal point is a central and rigorously symmetrical staircase, from which the rest of the building extends. It serves as one of only a few examples of civic baroque architecture during Portugal's Johannine period. Despite the scale of the earthquake experienced by Lisbon in 1755, which destroyed a large part of the city, the Palace of Santa Clara was virtually untouched.

The palace would continue to be the seat of the Marquesses of Lavradio in Lisbon until 1875, when it was acquired by the State to be used as Portugal's military courts of justice. D. José de Almeida Corrêa de Sá, the 6th Marquess, would be the last of the family to be born there, in 1874.

== Marquesses of Lavradio (1753) ==
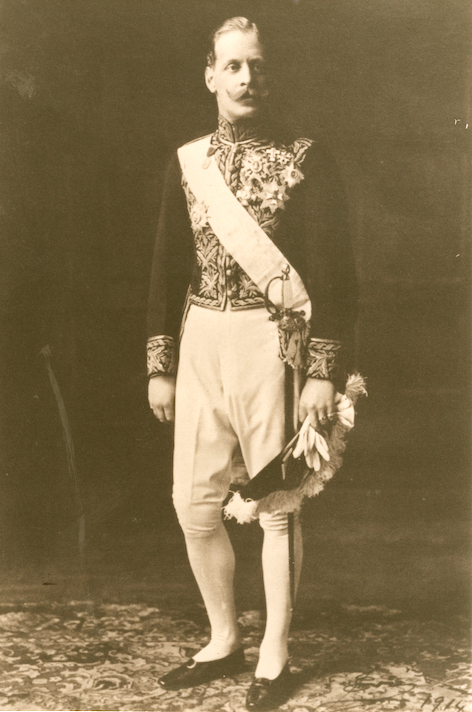
The 6th Marquess of Lavradio in the dress uniform of a Senior Officer of the Royal Household

1. D. António de Almeida Soares de Portugal (1701–1760), 1st Marquess and 1st Count of Lavradio, 4th Count of Avintes, 8th Viceroy of Brasil. Succeeded by his son
2. D. Luís de Almeida Portugal Soares de Alarcão d'Eça e Mello Silva Mascarenhas (1729–1790), 2nd Marquess of Lavradio, 5th Count of Avintes, 11th Viceroy of Brasil. Succeeded by his son
3. D. António Máximo de Almeida Portugal Soares de Alarcão Mello de Castro Ataíde d'Eça Mascarenhas Silva e Lancastre (1756–1833), 3rd Marquess of Lavradio, 6th Count of Avintes. Succeeded by his son
4. D. Luís de Almeida Portugal Soares de Alarcão Mello de Castro Ataíde d'Eça Mascarenhas Silva e Lancastre (1787–1812), 4th Marquess of Lavradio, 7th Count of Avintes. Succeeded by his brother
5. D. António de Almeida Portugal Soares de Alarcão Mello de Castro Ataíde d'Eça Mascarenhas Silva e Lancastre (1794–1874), 5th Marquess of Lavradio, 8th Count of Avintes. Succeeded by his great-grandson
6. D. José Maria do Espírito Santo de Almeida Corrêa de Sá (1874–1945), 6th Marquess of Lavradio, 9th Count of Avintes. Succeeded by his son
7. D. José Luís de Almeida (1912–1966), 7th Marquess of Lavradio, 11th Count of Avintes, following the premature death of his elder brother António, 10th Count of Avintes, in 1938. Succeeded by his son
8. D. Jaime de Almeida, 8th Marquess of Lavradio, 12th Count of Avintes, 6th Count of Torres Vedras.

== Coat of arms ==
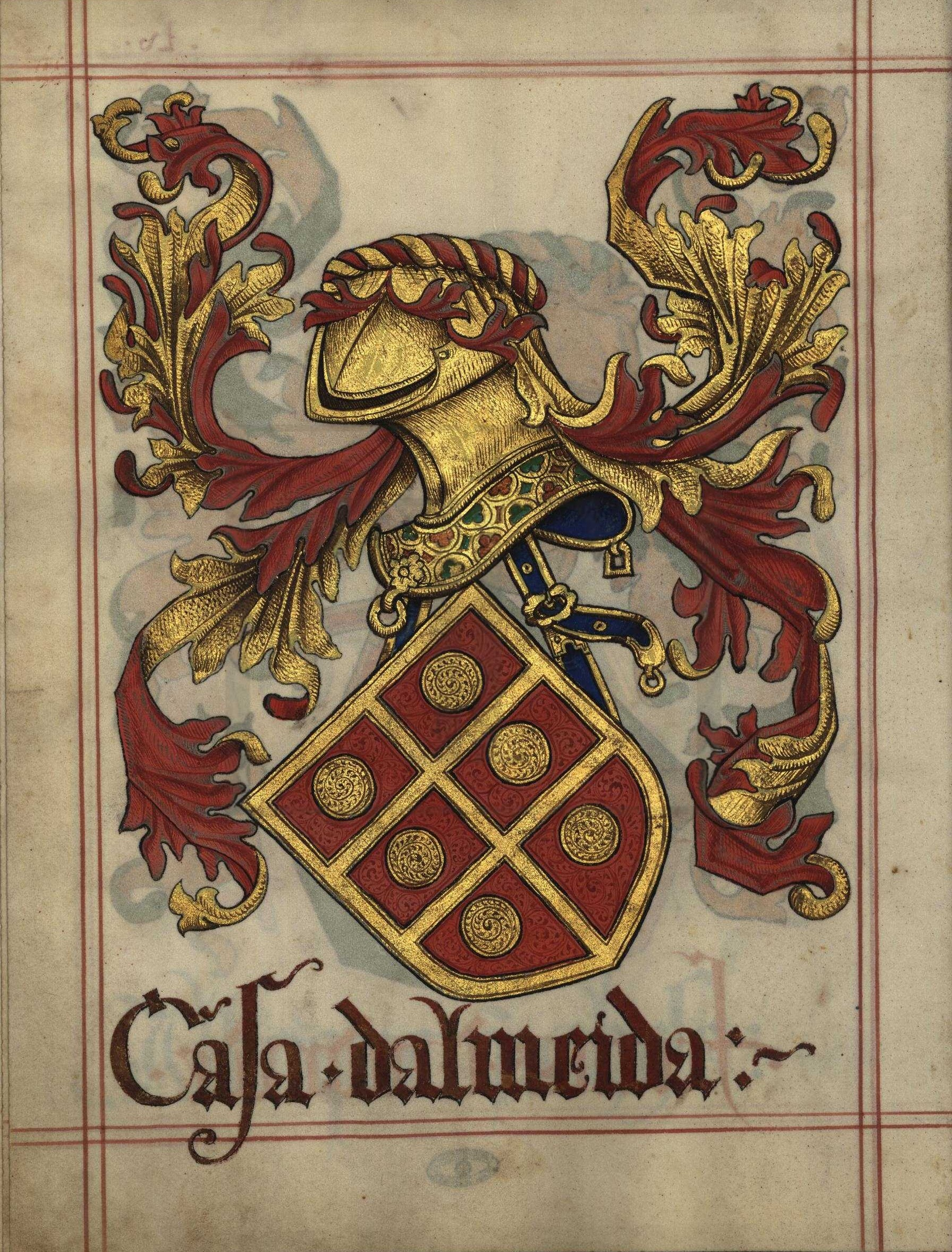
Arms of Almeida from the heraldic codex Livro do Armeiro-Mor of 1509

Notwithstanding their position as heads of various lineages, the Marquesses of Lavradio have traditionally always used the undifferenced arms of Almeida.

- Shield: Gules, a doubled cross Or between six bezants within a bordure of the second.
- Coronet: the shield is surmounted by a ducal coronet, an allusion to the titles of Duke of Aveiro and of Torres Novas.
- Crest: an eagle displayed, Sable, bezanté, armed and beaked Or and langued Gules.
- Motto: Desir de Bien Faire.

The Counts of Avintes use the same arms but for the crest, an eagle Gules rather than Sable.

== See also ==
- Counts of Avintes
- Counts of Lavradio
- Counts of Torres Vedras
