= Manuel Pereira da Silva =

Portuguese sculptor (1920–2003)

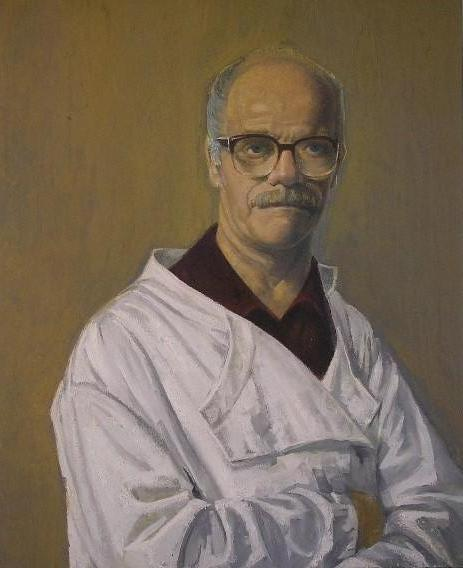
Manuel Pereira da Silva

Manuel Pereira da Silva (7 December 1920 – 2003) was a Portuguese sculptor. He was born in Avintes, Portugal.

The workmanship of Manuel Pereira da Silva has an abstract formal orientation inspired in the human figure, in particularly the man and the woman. In 2000, the Medal of Cultural Merit was attributed to Pereira da Silva for the City Council of Vila Nova de Gaia.

== Education ==
In 1939, he entered the Oporto University's College of Arts. In 1953, he finished his coursework with the final classification of 18 values. During his coursework he was distinguished with two awards, "Teixeira Lopes" and "Soares dos Reis".

In 1946 and 1947, he studied in Paris, France, at the Paris College of Arts.

== Selected works ==
- I Exposition of the Independents, in the Oporto University's College of Arts. (1943)
- II Exposition of the Independents, in the Atheneum Commercial of Oporto. (1944)
- III Exposition of the Independents, in the Coliseum of Oporto. (1945)
- Low-relives in Stone in the Rivoli Theatre and in the Coliseum, in Oporto. (1945)
- Exposition of the Portuguese Life and the Art in Lourenço Marques, Moçambique (1946)
- Exposition of Modern Art in the city of Caldas da Rainha. (1954)
- Sculpture in Bronze of General Ulysses S. Grant, 18º President of the United States of America between 1868 and 1876. This monument was ordered by the Portuguese Government to Pereira da Silva for the capital of Guiné-Bissau. (1955)
- Paintings in the Church of Saint Luzia, in the city of Viana do Castelo. (1956)
- Paintings of the "Snow White" in the Street of Saint Catarina, in Oporto. (1957)
- Sculpture in Bronze in the Square Marquis do Pombal, in Oporto. (1958)
- II Exposition of Modern Art in the city of Viana do Castelo. (1959)
- Low-relief in Ceramics in the capital of Angola. (1960)
- Low-relief in Stone of "D. Pedro Pitões exhorting the Crusades" in the Courthouse, in Oporto. (1961)
- II Exposition of Plastic Arts of the Foundation Calouste Gulbenkian, in the city of Lisbon. (1962)
- Retrospective Exposition in Homage to the workmanship of Pereira da Silva by the Artists Association of Vila Nova de Gaia. (1987)
