= Avintes =

- Civil parish
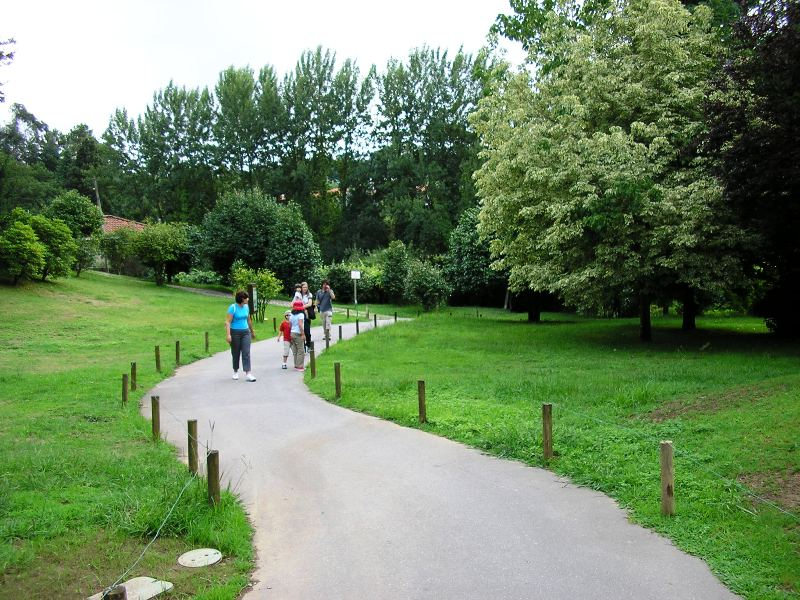
- The Biological Park of Vila Nova de Gaia, in Avintes

- Location in Portugal
- Coordinates: 41.107°N 8.551°W
- Country: Portugal
- Region: Norte
- Metropolitan area: Porto
- District: Porto
- Municipality: Vila Nova de Gaia

Area
  - Total: 8.82 km^{2} (3.41 sq mi)

Population (2011)
  - Total: 10,838
  - Density: 1,230/km^{2} (3,180/sq mi)
- Time zone: UTC+00:00 (WET)
  - Summer (DST): UTC+01:00 (WEST)
- Postal code: 4430
- Area code: 227
- Patron: São Pedro
- Website: http://www.avintes.net

Avintes is a Portuguese civil parish in the municipality of Vila Nova de Gaia. The population in 2021 was 10,838, in an area of 8.82 km^{2}. It is known in Portugal as "Terra da Broa", meaning "Land of the Broa", referring to the Broa de Avintes, a typical farmhouse bread widely consumed in Northern Portugal, which originated in Avintes.

== History ==
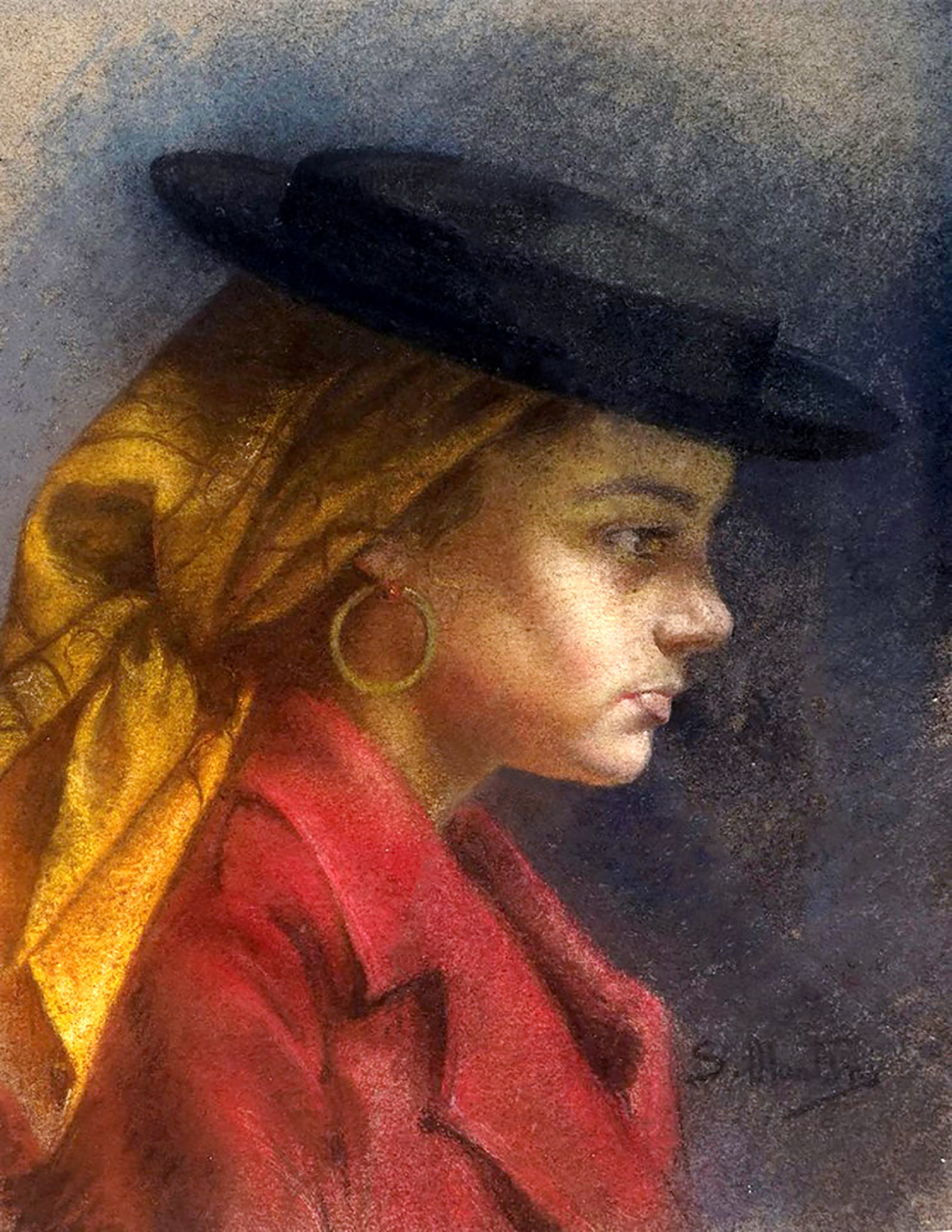
Avintes woman with typical costume, by Sofia Martins de Sousa

Some origins of the parish, date back to the early settlement during the Megalithic cultures of the Iberian peninsula; there are references to the area of Arcas, an ancient necropole, designated for its dolmens that might have been constructed in this region. Arcas and Arcaínhas were synonymous with Celtic dolmen and Castro culture populations. Yet, other historians suggest this name was actually a corruption of the term Areias referring to "sand". Regardless, few direct links specify the association with Neolithic cultures and settlement, although most assume that region was settled by Castro builders. Roman occupation of the peninsula occurred from the 2nd century B.C., forcing-out many of the indigenous cultures and imposing a provincial system in which the region of Avintes was part of the much larger Scallabitanus. There, too, is little to substantiate Roman occupation of this area. Even the celebrated "Roman bridge" over the Febros is likely medieval in construction.

After successive politico-administrative reorganizations (first by the Suebi, then the Visigoths), the region was taken by Arab forces from the south, following the Battle of Guadalete, in 714. The Reconquista that retook the lands south of the Douro, brought the region under the domain of the Galician province of Coimbra temporarily, under the regency of Count Vimara Peres, who organized the defense of the lands for King Alfonso III. But the land returned to Arab control around the 10th century. It was during this time that the first concrete reference to the village of Abientes, by celebrated writer D. Gundesindo, appeared (today in the Torre do Tombo), but whose reproduction is uncertain, even as Alexandre Herculano transcribed it.

Avintes was later referenced during the Inquirições (Inquiries) of King Afonso III in 1258, where it pertained to the judicial sector of Gondomar (south of the Douro River). In similar inquiries during the reign of King Denis, around 1284 (or 1288), the area was referenced as São Pedro de Avintes, where its religious limits were identified and its stewardship fixed to its vicar, Martim Anes. Little more is mentioned of the area, which was part of the parish of Seixezelo.

In 1300, the religious administration was donated to the Monastery of Santo Tirso, through a donation made by D. Constança Gil, who transferred several lands in Avintes, along the Douro, Porto and Soalhães, in memory of her husband and son, D. Gomes Sobrado and Martim Anes, respectively. Yet, by 16 April 1346, these lands were under the stewardship of the clerics of the Monastery of Pedroso. By 1487, it, once again, changed hands, passing to the Brandão family, through the donation made by D. Francisco de Sonsa, Abbott of Pedroso to Fernão Brandão. Fernão Brandão and his son, Diogo Brandão, were masters of the Estates of Avintes, and their descendants, by matrimonial descent, Counts of Avintes and Marquesses of Lavradio.

It was the daughter of Diogo Brandão, D. Isabel Brandão, who married, in 1570, D. Francisco de Almeida (eldest son of D. João de Almeida, Governor General of Tangiers and Governor of Angola), thus transferring the Estates of Avintes to the Almeida clan. D. Luís de Almeida received the title of Count of Avintes on 17 February 1664 from King Afonso, and in 1689 from King Peter II full rights of donatario to the comarca. The history of the Almeidas is ripe with grand deeds and illustrious personalities, who occupied their seat in Avintes until the First Portuguese Republic. On 17 January 1725, the fourth Count, D. António de Almeida Soares Portugal, was made Count of Lavradio by King John V, in recognition of the service of his uncle, D. Tomaz de Almeida, first patriarch of Lisbon; by royal proclamation, signed 18 October 1753, the family was elevated to the status of Marquesses of Lavradio (António de Almeida Soares Portugal who was also Governor of Angola and Viceroy of Brasil).

During the French invasion of the peninsula, Avintes was likely a sideshow; the parish did not have part in the great battles, although the Duke of Wellington may have chased Marshall Soult's forces, crossing the Douro in the immediate location, since crossing at Porto would have been difficult. Osório Gondim, was clearer, when he pronounced that "...nothing occurred here of note, unless you count the sack of the church". General Junot ordered all objects of value be carted to Porto, and from there they escaped to France.

During the Liberal Wars, Avintes hosted several pro- and anti-Miguelist/Absolutist disturbances: like an old woman who was injured by pro-Liberal supporters for having cheered passing Miguelist forces; or the time after the breaking of the siege of Porto, when there celebrating in Valbom, a Miguelist regiment attacked sympathizers traveling to the festival-like party, causing only one death in Avintes, while in Gramido the bodies covered the ground.

With these events, on 16 May 1832, Avintes became a municipality (formalized on 28 June 1834), and the first municipal council is installed in Tulha dos Dízimos on the 1 June, presided by António Francisco Aleixo (elected in September 1834). This small council had a working budget of 37,635 réis, in addition to a tax of meat sales, and a fee on sales made in the market along the Largo da Gandra (which itself had been operating since the reign of John IV).

== Geography ==
It is a town (pt. Vila) on the left bank of river Douro, east of the city of Gaia and south of Porto.

== Architecture ==
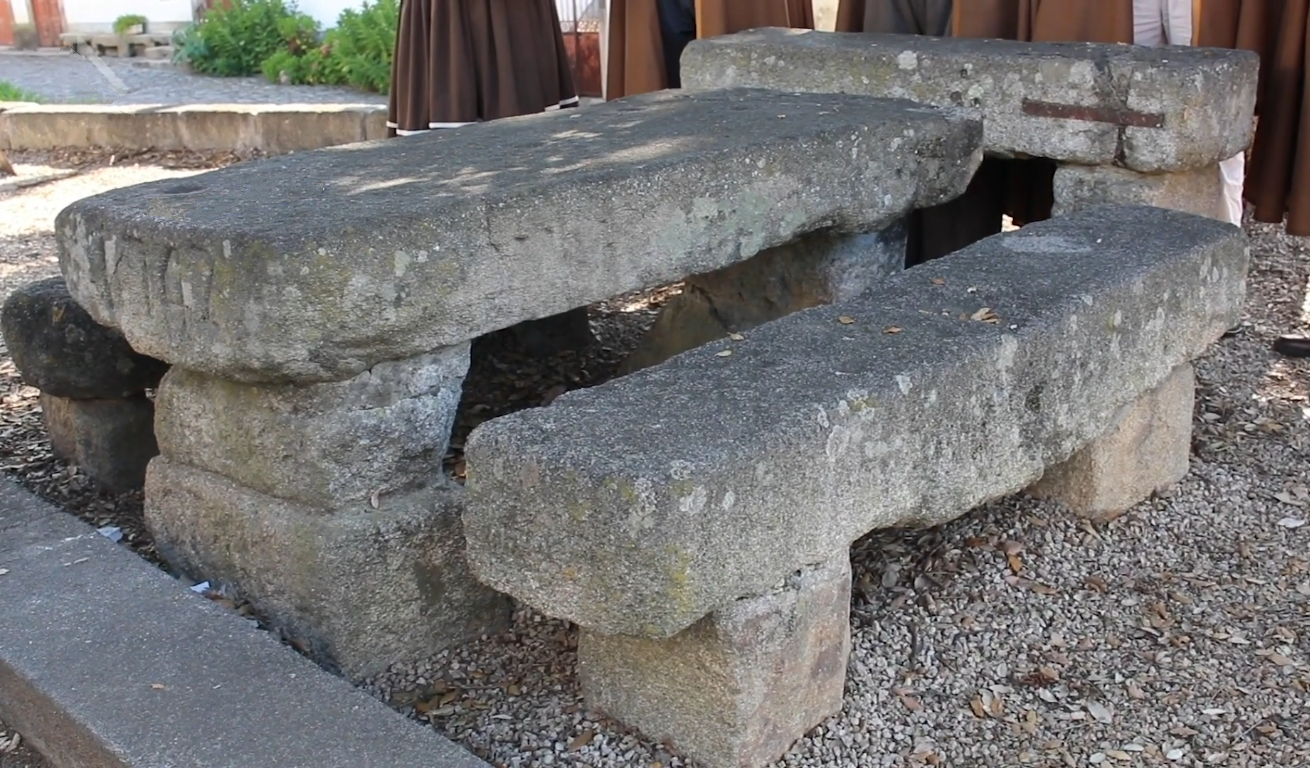
The Audience Stones in Avintes

Although best known for its Baroque-era church, the parish has a small number of classified architectural constructions dating back to the early period of Portuguese expansion. These include:

=== Civic ===
- Audience Stones (Portuguese: Pedras de Audiência e Carvalho Junto), constructed in mid-18th century, at a time when Avintes was a municipality in its own right, the audience stones comprise three stone benches and table in the raised platform central to the parish, originally used meetings and trials. In addition, an oak tree is part of the collection of objects;
- Manorhouse of the Estate of Santo Inácio de Fiães (Portuguese: Casa da Quinta de Santo Inácio de Fiães), a signeurial estate and residence, dated to the 17th century

=== Religious ===
- Church of São Pedro de Avintes (Portuguese: Igreja Paroquial de São Pedro de Avintes), which was constructed in 1758, under the direction of Jacome do Lago, following a Baroque-style;
- Cross of Alferes (Portuguese: Cruzeiro de Alferes), constructed in 1737, by an ensign, recognizable for the image of Nossa Senhora do Bom Successo (Our Lady of Good Success), which surmounts the cross.

== Tourism ==
- Gaia Biological Park (Parque Biológico de Gaia) is a 34-acre natural reserve which features diverse flora and fauna in their natural habitat. Founded in 1983, it features more than 40 species of wild birds and a 3 km pedestrian route.
- Saint Inácio Zoo (Zoo Santo Inácio) founded in 2000, is the biggest zoo in Northern Portugal, housing more than 800 animals of 270 different species.
- Areinho de Avintes, an area surrounding the fluvial beach bathed by the Douro. Frequented by a lot of Gaia residents in the Summer time for beach-going, picnics, sports and other leisure activities.
- Monument to Combatants (Monumento aos Combatentes), a sculpture honoring the memory of all the Avintes citizens who fought in the Portuguese Colonial War, specially the 10 who perished.

== People ==
- Maria Isabel Wittenhall van Zeller, a pioneer of smallpox vaccination in Portugal, was born in Avintes in 1749.
- António Fernandes de Sá, sculptor, was born in Avintes in 1874.
- Henrique Moreira, sculptor, was born in Avintes in 1890.
- Manuel Pereira da Silva, sculptor, was born in Avintes in 1920.
- José Vaz, writer, was born in Avintes in 1940.
- Adriano Correia de Oliveira, musician known for his fado and protest music was raised in Avintes since few months old.
- Joaquim Pinto Vieira, painter, was born in Avintes in 1946.
- Tulipa, ex-footballer and football manager, was born in Avintes in 1972.

== Futebol Clube de Avintes ==
Founded on 23 July 1923, Futebol Clube de Avintes is the local football club. As of the 2022/23 season, the senior team, coached by Bruno Cunha, competes in the Divisão de Elite of the Porto Football Association, equivalent to the Portuguese 5th tier. The club's president is Rúben Rodrigues Pereira.

== See also ==
- Broa de Avintes, a bread from the region
- Count of Avintes
