= Fernando Lanhas =

Portuguese painter and architect

Fernando Lanhas, GOSE (16 September 1923 – 4 February 2012) was a Portuguese painter and architect.

Lanhas was born and died in Porto. He studied architecture but became known as the leading name in Portuguese abstract painting. He started painting in 1944, influenced by music, astronomy, and the international abstract movement. Since then, he's been one of the most innovative and original Portuguese painters.
