= Viscount of Barbacena =

Viscount of Barbacena (Portuguese: Visconde de Barbacena) was a Portuguese noble title created by Dom Pedro, Prince Regent for Dom Afonso VI of Portugal, via a royal decree dated 19 December 1671, in favor of Afonso Furtado de Castro do Rio de Mendonça, 5th Lord of Barbacena and Governor-general of Brazil.

== Titleholders ==
- Afonso Furtado de Castro do Rio de Mendonça (1671-1675), 5th Lord and 1st Viscount of Barbacena;
- Jorge Furtado de Mendonça (1675-1708), 2nd Viscount of Barbacena;
- Afonso Furtado de Mendonça (1708-?), 3rd Viscount of Barbacena;
- Luís Xavier Furtado de Mendonça (?-?), 4th Viscount of Barbacena;
- Francisco Vicente Xavier Furtado de Castro do Rio de Mendonça (?-1790), 5th Viscount of Barbacena;
- Luís António Furtado de Castro do Rio de Mendonça e Faro (1790-1830), 6th Viscount and 1st Count of Barbacena;
- Francisco Furtado de Castro do Rio de Mendonça (1830-1854), 7th Viscount and 2nd Count of Barbacena.

The 2nd Count of Barbacena, who left no descendants, was the last holder of the title, which has since remained vacant.
