= Dominus (title) =

Title in Ancient Rome

Dominus is the Latin word for Lord or owner. Dominus was used primarily as an imperial title during the era of the Roman Empire (25 BC – 1453 AD) and was also the Latin title of the feudal, superior and mesne, lords. Dominus was also used as an ecclesiastical and academic title during that time. The ecclesiastical title was translated from the French seigneur into English as sir, making it a common prefix for parsons before the Reformation. This is evident by the character's name Sir Hugh Evans in Shakespeare's Merry Wives of Windsor. The title Dominus is still used in modern times for those with a Bachelor of Arts degree.

The shortened form for Dominus – Dom – has remained in use in modern times as a prefix of honor for ecclesiastics of the Catholic Church, and members of religious orders, especially for those of the monastic Order of Saint Benedict, the Benedictines, who have professed perpetual religious vows. The Spanish equivalents of Doña and the French equivalent of Dame are given to nuns of the Benedictine order.

Many romance languages use some form of the honorific Don, which derives from this term. Further, the Romanian word for God, Dumnezeu, derives from this title through the Latin phrase "Domine Deus." (Lord God) The Basque language uses jaundone (from Basque jaun, "lord", and Romance dom'ne) and done as a prefix for the names of some saints as in jaundone Jakue, "St. James" and Donostia (the city of San Sebastián).

== Etymology ==
The term derives from the Proto-Italic *dom-o/u-no- meaning "[he] of the house," ultimately relating to the Proto-Indo-European root *dem- meaning "to build," through domus (house); hence, the dominus is the lord and ruler of the house.

== Roman imperial use ==
The basic Roman-era meaning of dominus was "an owner", including the owner of a house or enslaved persons. When used to address a person (as domine in the vocative case), the word had a different meaning: it is not known to have been used by enslaved persons to address their masters, but is attested as a flattering address to lovers, and as a flattering or respectful address to family members or others.

During the Principate, dominus could be used in a polite or flattering manner for emperors, but this was controversial because of the possible implication of enslavement. Augustus actively discouraged the practice, and Tiberius in particular is said to have reviled it as sycophancy. Domitian encouraged its use, but none of the emperors used the term in any semi-official capacity until the reign of Aurelian in AD 274, where coins were issued bearing the inscription deus et dominus natus.

However, under Diocletian the term dominus was adopted as part of the emperor's official titulature, forming part of Diocletian's radical reforms. It's from this use that the term Dominate is sometimes used to refer to the period of Roman history beginning with the reign of Diocletian.

== English use ==
The feminine form Domina was a title formerly given to noble ladies who held a barony in their own right in old English Law. Many female honorifics used in modern English trace their roots back to this title, through the Anglo-French and still extant in modern French, dame and madame. The most common are madam and its contracted form ma'am. Another notable example is Dame, a more narrow equivalent to Sir used for recipients of chivalric honors. (Damehood being the equivalent to the male knighthood.)

Cambridge University continues to use both Dominus and Domina, abbreviated as Dnus. or Ds and Dna. or Da respectively, for those who have achieved a BA, and its derived term Don continues to see use in reference to professors, lecturers, and fellows at Oxford and Cambridge.

== See also ==
- Don (honorific) - for the derived Romance language titles
- Roman Empire
