= Madeleine Caulier =

- Born: 1680; Avelin, France
- Died: 1712 (aged 31–32); Denain, France
- Occupations: Servant, soldier

Madeleine Caulier (born 1680 in Avelin, died 1712 near Denain) was a French servant, soldier, and heroine of the War of the Spanish Succession, a figure who is partially legendary.

== Biography ==
Madeleine Caulier is a semi-legendary figure, as – according to French historian Sarah Dumortier – there is a lack of conclusive archival evidence to confirm her actual existence.

She was said to have been born in Avelin in 1680, during the reign of Louis XIV. Madeleine was a poor village girl who worked as a servant at an inn called Le Tournebride.

On 11 July 1708, in the seventh year of the War of the Spanish Succession, French forces were defeated at the Battle of Oudenarde. This victory opened the way for the anti-French coalition’s forces deeper into Flanders. On August 14 of that year, an army of 110,000 soldiers under the command of Duke John Churchill and Prince Eugene of Savoy began the siege of the heavily fortified city of Lille. Though a French army was dispatched to relieve the city, they did not dare to engage the allies in open battle, instead attempting maneuvers and diversionary actions to force the allies to abandon the siege.

One of the French soldiers serving in the Lille garrison was Madeleine Caulier’s brother. This allowed her to pass through one of the city gates. According to one version, French officers, learning of this, asked her to deliver a message to the besieged city, to which she agreed. In other accounts, the French staff stopped at the inn Le Tournebride, and after overhearing a conversation among officers about how to deliver a message to Lille, Madeleine volunteered her help, surprising those present.

The next morning, Madeleine set out on her journey. She encountered difficulties along the way and was reportedly stopped by allied guards at one point. When questioned by the English, she claimed she was traveling to Ronchin to visit her sick father (or uncle). She was brought before General William Cadogan, who allowed her to continue her journey. Eventually, she reached Lille and delivered the message to Marshal Louis-François de Boufflers. (Note: In the final analysis, her deed did not change the outcome of the siege. On 8 December 1712, Marshal de Boufflers signed an honorable surrender and left the citadel in Lille with the garrison (Lynn (2015, p. 722)).) Accounts differ on whether she delivered a hidden letter or memorized the message.

Upon her return to Avelin, the Duke of Burgundy sought to reward her. However, she declined any monetary reward. Her only wish was to become a soldier, and this request was granted. Disguised as a man, she fought in a dragoon regiment. Madeleine is believed to have died on 24 July 1712 during the victorious Battle of Denain. According to another, though less likely, version, she fell in the 1709 Battle of Malplaquet.

== Commemoration ==
Since 1881, a square in the Fives district of Lille has borne the name Madeleine Caulier. A metro station opened near the square in 1983 was also named Caulier. In January 2024, a petition was submitted to the city authorities requesting the station's name be changed to Madeleine Caulier to more clearly highlight that it honors a female heroine.

== Bibliography ==
- Lynn, John A. (2015). Wojny Ludwika XIV: 1667–1714 [Wars of Louis XIV: 1667–1714] (in Polish). Oświęcim: Napoleon V. ISBN 978-83-7889-552-7.
- Tranchant, Alfred; Ladimir, Jules (1866). Les Femmes Militaires de la France depuis les temps les plus reculés jusqu'à nos jours [The Military Women of France from the Earliest Times to Our Days] (in French). Paris: Cournol.
