= War of the Spanish Succession =

1701–1714 European great power conflict

- Part of French–Habsburg rivalry; Anglo-French Wars
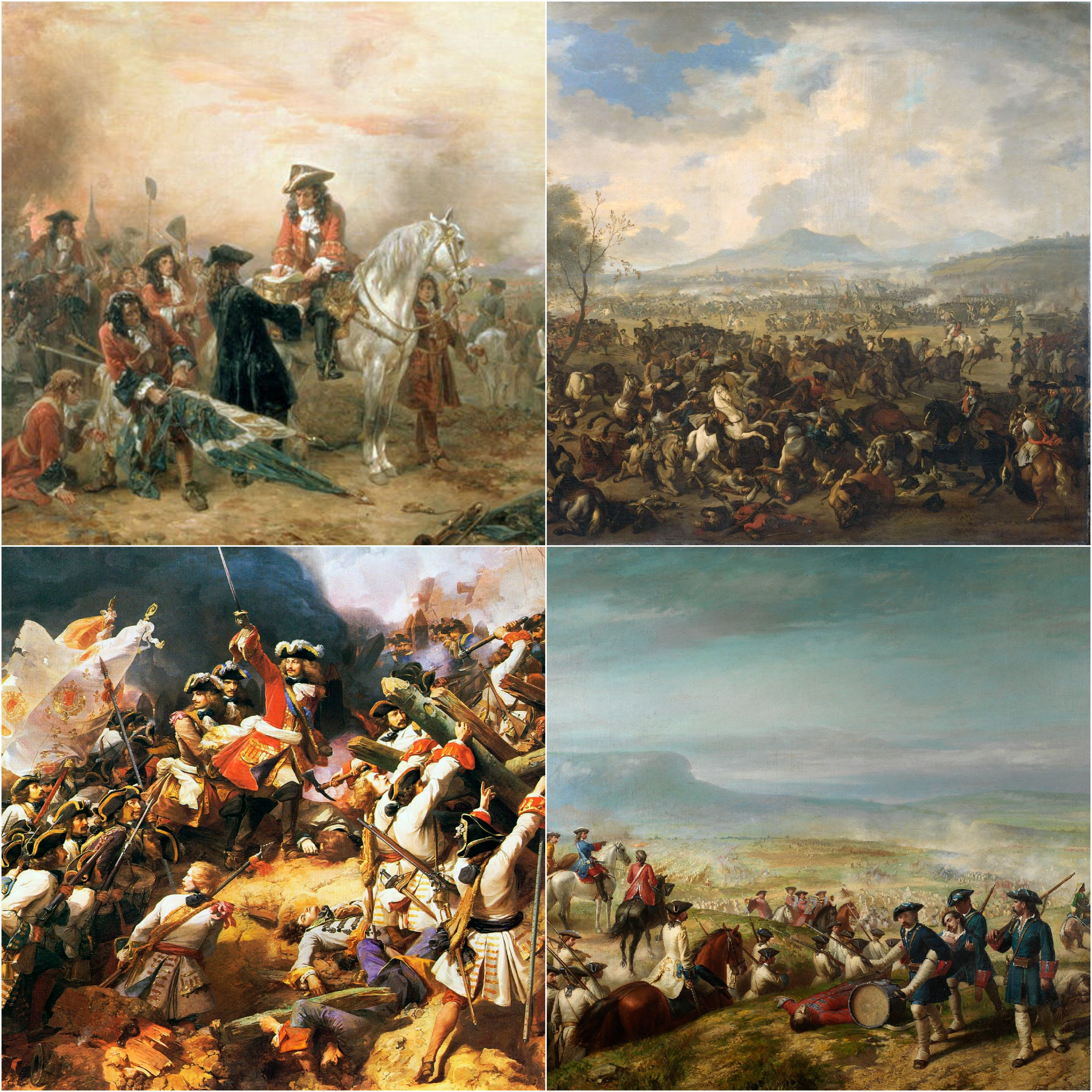
- Clockwise, from top left: Blenheim 1704; Ramillies 1706; Almansa 1707; Denain 1714
Date	March 1701 – 7 September 1714 (13 years)
Location	Europe, Atlantic, Mediterranean Sea, Caribbean
Result	Treaties of Utrecht, Rastatt, and Baden
Territorial changes	Philip V recognised as King of Spain, but renounces his place in the French line of succession.; Spain cedes Milan, the Spanish Netherlands, Naples and Sardinia to Austria; Sicily to Savoy; Colonia del Sacramento to Portugal; and Great Britain retains Gibraltar and Menorca. Crown of Aragon abolished.; France cedes Ypres, Tournai, Menen, Veurne, Fort Knokke, and Warneton to Austria, while gaining the Principality of Orange and the Ubaye Valley.; Dutch Republic gains barrier fortresses and part of Upper Guelders.; Mantua absorbed into Austria, Montferrat to Savoy.

Belligerents
Pro-Bourbon Spain (Note: Borbónicos)	Pro-Habsburg Spain (Note: Austracistas)
France; Bavaria; Cologne; Liège; Portugal (until 1702); Savoy (until 1703); Mantua	Holy Roman Empire; Great Britain (Note: England and Scotland formally participated as separate countries prior to the Acts of Union 1707.); Dutch Republic; Prussia (from 1702); Portugal (from 1702); Savoy (from 1703)

Commanders and leaders
Philip V; Villadarias; Belluga; Velasco; Bedmar; Louis XIV; Villars; Vendôme; Berwick; Boufflers; Villeroy; Tallard; Vaudreuil; Tessé; Châteaurenault; Maximilian II; Arco; Maffei; Francis II Rákóczi	Emperor Charles VI; Basset y Ramos; Casanova; Leopold I; Joseph I; Savoy; Starhemberg; Württemberg; Anne; Harley; Marlborough; Ormonde; Massue; Heinsius; (Dutch Republic) Athlone; Ouwerkerk; Tilly; Frederick I; Peter II; John V; Minas; Victor Amadeus II

Strength
Total pro-Bourbon; Land forces c. 500,000 maximum (Note: : 255,000–400,000: : 70,000 (Note: The Spanish Army consisted of three separate forces; Spain (20,000), Spanish Netherlands (35,000) and Italy (15,000). These are authorised numbers and actual were almost certainly lower.); : 20,000); Naval forces c. 131 ships of the line (Note: Split: : 105 ships of the line; : 26 ships of the line)	Total pro-Habsburg; Land forces c. 600,000 maximum (Note: Split as follows: : 260,090–343,000 (Note: Annual average, 1701–1713. The Austrian army made up nearly half this force. Wilson estimates Imperial strength averaged 260,090 for the war's duration and peaked at 343,000 in 1710.); : 119,000 (Note: Ostwald estimates Dutch strength peaked at 137,000.) (Note: In addition the Dutch possessed the only significant siege engineering corps of the Grand Alliance.); : 70,000; : 15,000; : 26,500); Naval forces c. 211 ships of the line (Note: Split between: : 123 ships of the line; : 86 ships of the line)

Casualties and losses
Total pro-Bourbon; c. 600,000–700,000 killed, wounded, or died from disease (Note: split: : 500,000–600,000 killed and wounded; : c. 100,000 killed and wounded)	Total pro-Habsburg; c. 500,000–600,000 killed, wounded, or died from disease (Note: Split: 250,000 killed and wounded (Note: 32,000 British soldiers died): : 200,000 killed and wounded (Note: Split 50:50 between Habsburg monarchy and other HRE states.); : 50,000 killed and wounded; : 50,000 killed and wounded)

The War of the Spanish Succession (Note: Spanish: Guerra de sucesión española) (1701 to 1714) was a European great power conflict. The death of King Charles II of Spain in November 1700 without children led to a succession crisis between Philip of Anjou and Charles of Austria. Philip was the candidate named universal heir by Charles II in his will, and his claim was supported by his grandfather King Louis XIV of France; Charles of Austria was backed by the Second Grand Alliance. (Note: Its primary members included Austria, the Dutch Republic, and Great Britain.) Related conflicts include the Great Northern War and Queen Anne's War in North America.

Although no longer dominant in Europe, the Spanish Empire remained a global power when Charles II died in 1700. This meant its acquisition by France or Austria threatened the European balance of power, and Philip's proclamation as king on 16 November 1700 triggered war. However, who ruled Spain was arguably less important than the division of its territories, an issue increasingly prominent as the war progressed.

By 1709, although the Grand Alliance had forced France onto the defensive, Philip had secured his position in Spain. When Charles of Austria became Holy Roman emperor in 1711, the new British government began negotiating their withdrawal from the war. The loss of British military and financial support forced their allies to agree to the 1713 Peace of Utrecht, followed by the treaties of Rastatt and Baden in 1714.

Philip was confirmed as king of Spain but renounced his rights in the French royal line of succession. Most Spanish possessions in Italy were ceded to Savoy or to Austria, the latter also acquiring the Austrian Netherlands. Britain retained the key ports of Gibraltar and Menorca and now replaced the Dutch Republic as the leading European naval and commercial power, the latter thereafter declining as a major force. Although France was left financially exhausted, the installation of a Bourbon on the Spanish throne achieved its long-envisioned goal of breaking the Habsburg monarchy's encirclement of its borders.

== Background ==
Charles II of Spain became king in 1665 at the age of four, and a combination of poor health and lack of children meant who succeeded him was a long-standing European diplomatic issue. As early as 1670, Charles II of England agreed to support the claim of Louis XIV of France (a grandson of Philip III of Spain through his mother Anne of Austria), while the 1689 Grand Alliance committed England and the Dutch Republic to back Leopold I, Holy Roman Emperor (another grandson of Philip III, through his mother Maria Anna of Spain).

When Charles II died in 1700, the Spanish Empire was no longer dominant in Europe, but remained a global entity, whose territories included much of Italy, the Americas, the Spanish Netherlands, and the Philippines. Since the acquisition of all of these by either Austria or France was unacceptable, negotiations between Louis and Emperor Leopold focused on their division. The Spanish, who were not consulted, refused to allow this, ultimately leading to a war that involved most of Europe. The 1700–1721 Great Northern War is considered a connected conflict since it affected the involvement of states such as Sweden, Saxony, Denmark–Norway and Russia.

Armies in the 1688 to 1697 Nine Years' War frequently numbered over 100,000, requiring expenditure unsustainable for pre-industrial economies. The 1690s also marked the low point of the Little Ice Age, a period of cold and wet weather that drastically reduced crop yields across Europe. The Great Famine of 1695–1697 killed an estimated 15–25% of the population in present-day Scotland, Scandinavia and the Baltic states, plus another two million in France and Northern Italy.

This combination of financial exhaustion and famine led to the October 1697 Treaty of Ryswick, a compromise that left the succession unresolved. Since it now seemed clear Charles would die without children, Leopold signed only with extreme reluctance, and all sides viewed Ryswick as only a temporary suspension of hostilities.

== Partition treaties ==
Unlike France or Austria, the Spanish throne could be inherited by and through women. This allowed Charles' sisters Maria Theresa and Margaret Theresa to pass their rights onto the children of their respective marriages with Louis XIV and Emperor Leopold. Louis sought to secure his "rights" by ignoring the Spanish and negotiating directly with William III of England, main co-ordinator of the Grand Alliance.

Leopold and Margaret had a daughter Maria Antonia, who married Maximilian II Emanuel, Elector of Bavaria in 1685, and in 1692, they had a son, Joseph Ferdinand. In October 1698, France, Britain and the Dutch Republic designated Joseph as heir to Charles II, in return for which France and Austria would be compensated with Spanish territories. Charles published another will specifying Joseph would inherit an undivided Spanish monarchy, but the latter's death from smallpox in February 1699 undid these arrangements.

In 1685, Maria Antonia passed her claim to the Spanish throne onto Leopold's sons, Joseph and Archduke Charles. Her right to do so was doubtful, but Louis and William agreed the 1700 Treaty of London, making Leopold's son Archduke Charles the new heir. Its terms included territorial concessions to France, Savoy and Austria, but neither Leopold nor Charles agreed, rendering the treaty largely pointless. By early October 1700, Charles was dying. His final will left the throne to Louis XIV's grandson Philip of Anjou, and if he refused, the offer would pass to his younger brother the Duke of Berry, followed by Archduke Charles.

Charles died on 1 November 1700, and Spanish ambassadors formally offered the throne to Philip eight days later. Louis briefly considered refusing, since although it meant the succession of Archduke Charles, insisting William help him enforce the Treaty of London meant his territorial aims might be achieved peacefully. However, French diplomats argued Austria would fight regardless, while neither the British nor Dutch would go to war for a settlement intended to avoid war. Louis therefore accepted on behalf of his grandson, who was proclaimed Philip V of Spain on 16 November 1700.

== Prelude to war ==
With most of his objectives achieved by diplomacy, Louis XIV now made a series of moves that combined to make war inevitable. The Tory majority in the Parliament of England objected to the French acquisition of Sicily, an important base for the highly profitable Levant Company trade. A foreign diplomat observed their reluctance to become involved in a European land war was only true "so long as English commerce does not suffer". Louis either failed to appreciate or decided to ignore this exception, and his actions gradually eroded Tory opposition.

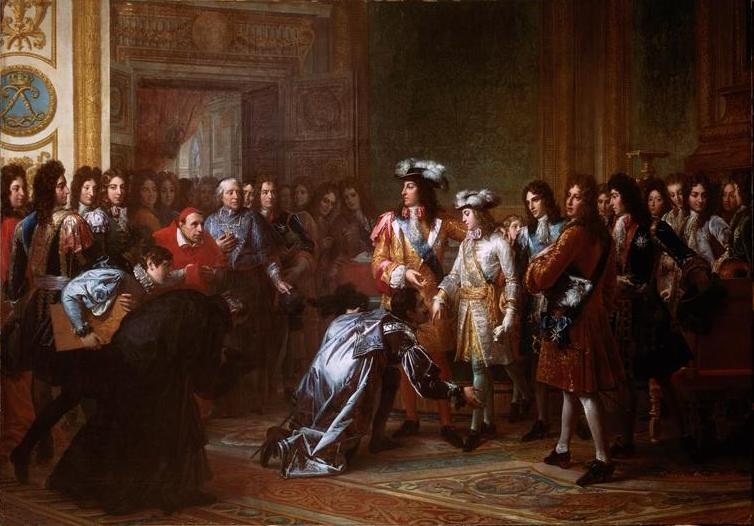
Proclamation of Philip of Anjou as Philip V of Spain, Versailles, 16 November 1700

In early 1701, Louis XIV registered Philip's claim to the French throne with the Parlement of Paris, raising the possibility of union with Spain, contrary to Charles' will, though Philip was only third in the French succession. In February, the Spanish-controlled Duchy of Milan and allied Duchy of Mantua in Northern Italy announced their support for Philip and accepted French troops. Leopold could not ignore these moves, especially when combined with French diplomatic efforts to build alliances with Imperial circles in Swabia and Franconia.

Over the course of 1701, Maximilian II Emanuel, the pro-French Governor of the Spanish Netherlands, allowed their troops to replace Dutch garrisons in the 'Barrier' fortresses granted at Ryswick. This threatened Dutch control of the Scheldt, a primary gain from the 1648 Peace of Münster, while access to Antwerp and Ostend would allow France to blockade the English Channel at will. Combined with other actions that threatened English trade, this produced a clear majority for war in Parliament, which in May 1701 urged William to negotiate an anti-French alliance.

On 7 September, Leopold, the Dutch Republic and Britain (Note: England and Scotland were separate kingdoms until 1707 but the Treaty was signed by William as King of Great Britain) signed the Treaty of The Hague renewing the 1689 Grand Alliance. Its provisions included securing the Dutch Barrier in the Spanish Netherlands, the Protestant succession in England and Scotland and an independent Spain, but did not refer to placing Archduke Charles on the Spanish throne. When the exiled James II of England died on 16 September 1701, Louis XIV reneged on his recognition of William III at Ryswick in 1697, and supported the claim of James Francis Edward Stuart to the British throne. When William died in March 1702, his successor Queen Anne confirmed her support for the Treaty of the Hague. Despite French hopes domestic political conflicts would prevent this, the Dutch Republic declared war on 8 May. This was followed by Britain and Leopold on 15th, and the Imperial Diet on 30 September.

== General strategic drivers ==
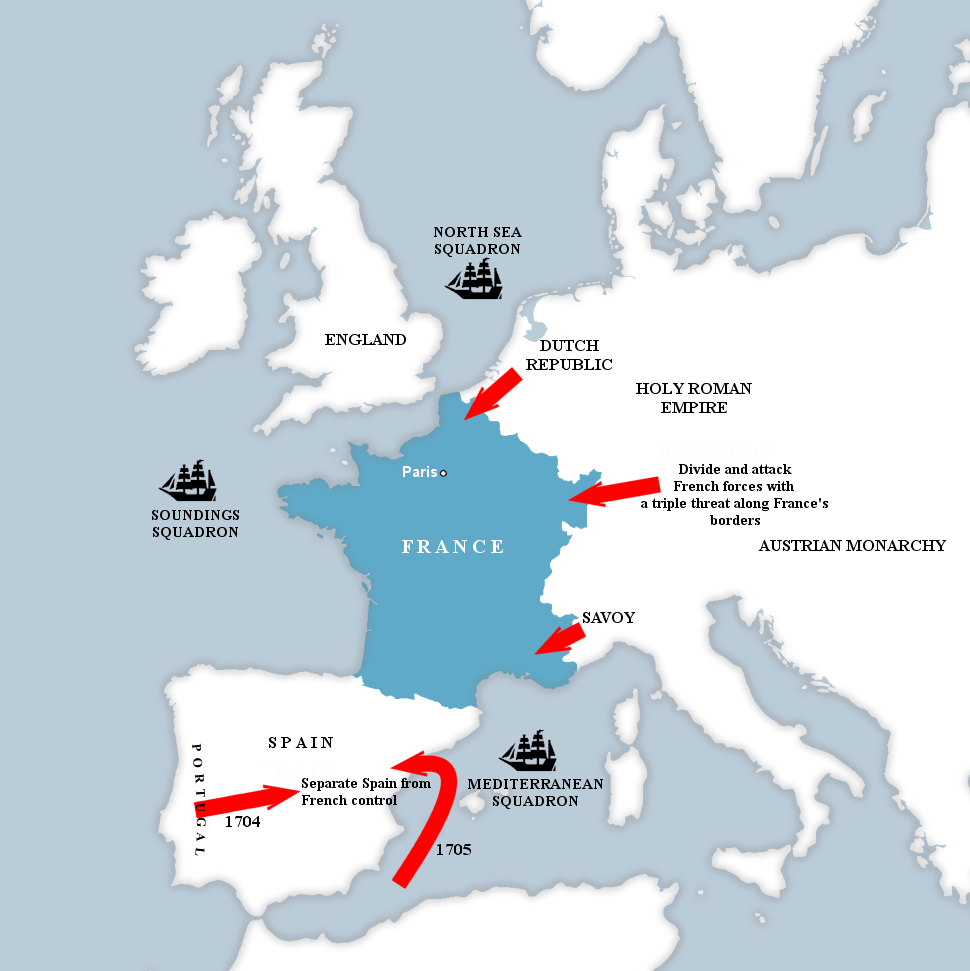
France's central position required the Grand Alliance to attack on exterior lines.

Contemporaries viewed Dutch and English support for the Habsburg candidate as primarily driven by economics, seeking access to Spanish markets in the Americas. The then dominant economic theory of mercantilism viewed global trade as relatively static. This meant increasing market share required taking it from someone else, with states often facilitating this by attacking their opponents' shipping and trading posts.

This expanded the war to North America, India, and other parts of Asia, with tariffs used as a policy weapon. The 1651–1663 Navigation Acts were a major factor in the Anglo-Dutch Wars, while between 1690 and 1704, English import duties on foreign goods increased by 400%. On 6 September 1700, France banned the import of English manufactured goods such as cloth and imposed prohibitive duties on a wide range of others.

Economics also dictated the size of the armies employed. Between 1702 and 1707, those used in the Netherlands varied from 60,000 to 80,000 men, rising to over 120,000 after 1708, which placed immense strain on pre-industrial economies. Their dependence on water-borne transport for supplies meant campaigning often focused on rivers like the Rhine or Danube, while their relative absence limited operations in areas like Northern Spain. Better logistics, unified command, and simpler internal lines of communication gave French and Spanish troops an advantage over their opponents.

== Strategic objectives by participant ==
=== Spain ===
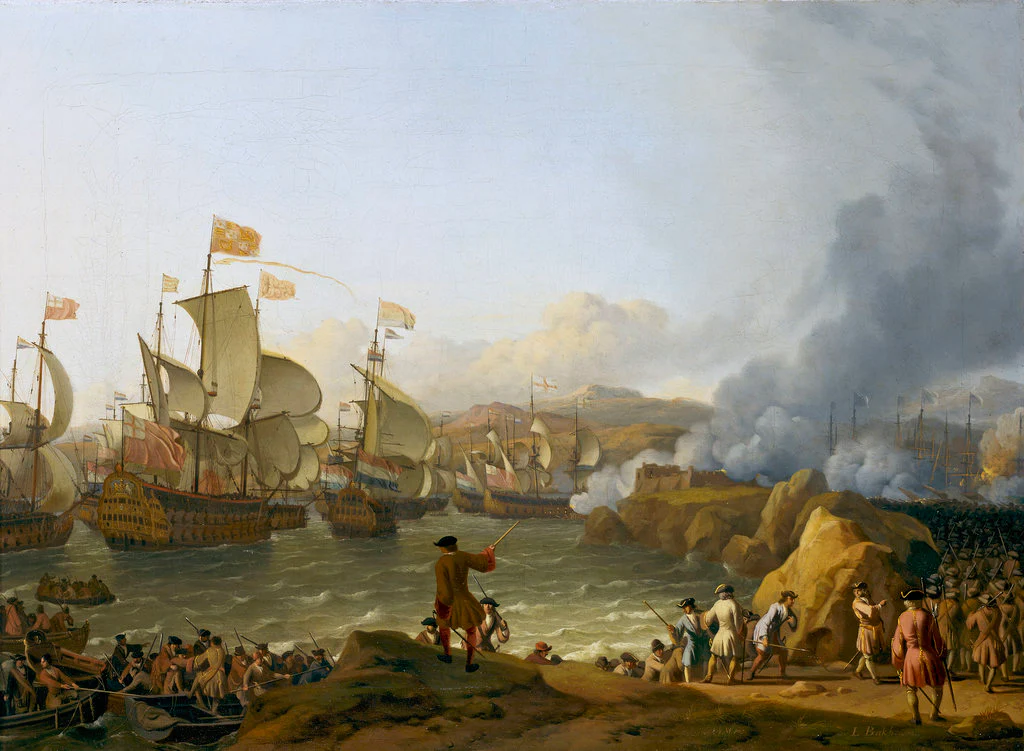
An Anglo-Dutch squadron captures a Spanish treasure fleet, Vigo Bay, October 1702

The Spanish empire remained a global power in 1701, supported by large imports of silver bullion from mines in the Americas. However, most of this income was already committed to holders of government debt or foreign merchants, often years in advance. When the Bourbons took over, they found the empire bankrupt and effectively defenceless, with fewer than 15,000 troops in Spain itself and a navy consisting of 20 ships.

Depopulation and multiple financial crises over the course of the 17th century left the economy reliant upon outsiders. Spanish agriculture depended on Louis' willingness to allow the import of seasonal French labourers, an important consideration in the decision to name Philip as Charles' successor. Their dependence on Dutch and English merchants was illustrated two years after the war began in 1703, when the French ambassador urged Louis to allow them to continue purchasing Spanish wool, "otherwise the flocks cannot be maintained".

Essential reforms were constantly delayed because Habsburg Spain was a personal union between the Crowns of Castile and Aragon, each with very different political cultures. (Note: The Crown of Aragon was further sub-divided into the kingdoms of Aragon, Valencia, Majorca, Naples, Sicily, Sardinia and the Principality of Catalonia.) Support for the Bourbons came primarily from the Castilian elite, who saw the Nueva Planta decrees as essential to preserve their power. As this meant the elimination of traditional Aragonese privileges, Austracista support for the Hapsburgs was strongest in Catalonia and Valencia.

=== France ===
Broadly speaking, French objectives were to prevent others acquiring an undivided Spanish monarchy, to secure their borders with the Holy Roman Empire while weakening Austria, and to establish exclusive access to trade with Spanish America. At the outbreak of war, France was perhaps the most powerful state in Europe. Its army, along with the associated logistical and financial support base, was more powerful than any of its rivals individually. Its geographical position provided enormous tactical flexibility, while the concentration of power under Louis XIV meant a relatively unified strategy, unlike their opponents. Although the Nine Years' War had shown France could not impose its objectives unilaterally, the new alliance with Spain and Bavaria made a successful outcome more likely.

However, France had still not recovered from the financial effects of the previous wars, leading some statesmen to advise against a purely offensive strategy. They argued that the combined might of the Grand Alliance forces made it highly improbable for France to launch a successful attack. The Dutch and Imperial fortresses were located far from convenient Franco-Spanish bases, and the Netherlands and Rhineland lacked easily navigable rivers for the Bourbon armies. Furthermore, besieging a major Dutch fortress demanded the commitment of two full armies. The French would thus pursue a strategy described as a "mixed war" in Europe. In this strategy, the Franco-Spanish forces would primarily assume a defensive posture to safeguard the vital fortresses they needed to retain. Offensive actions, on the other hand, were characterized by assertive posturing and strategic positioning, with an emphasis on sustaining their forces by living off enemy territory whenever feasible, while blocking enemy thrusts, and trying to engage them in battle where possible.

=== Austria and the Holy Roman Empire ===
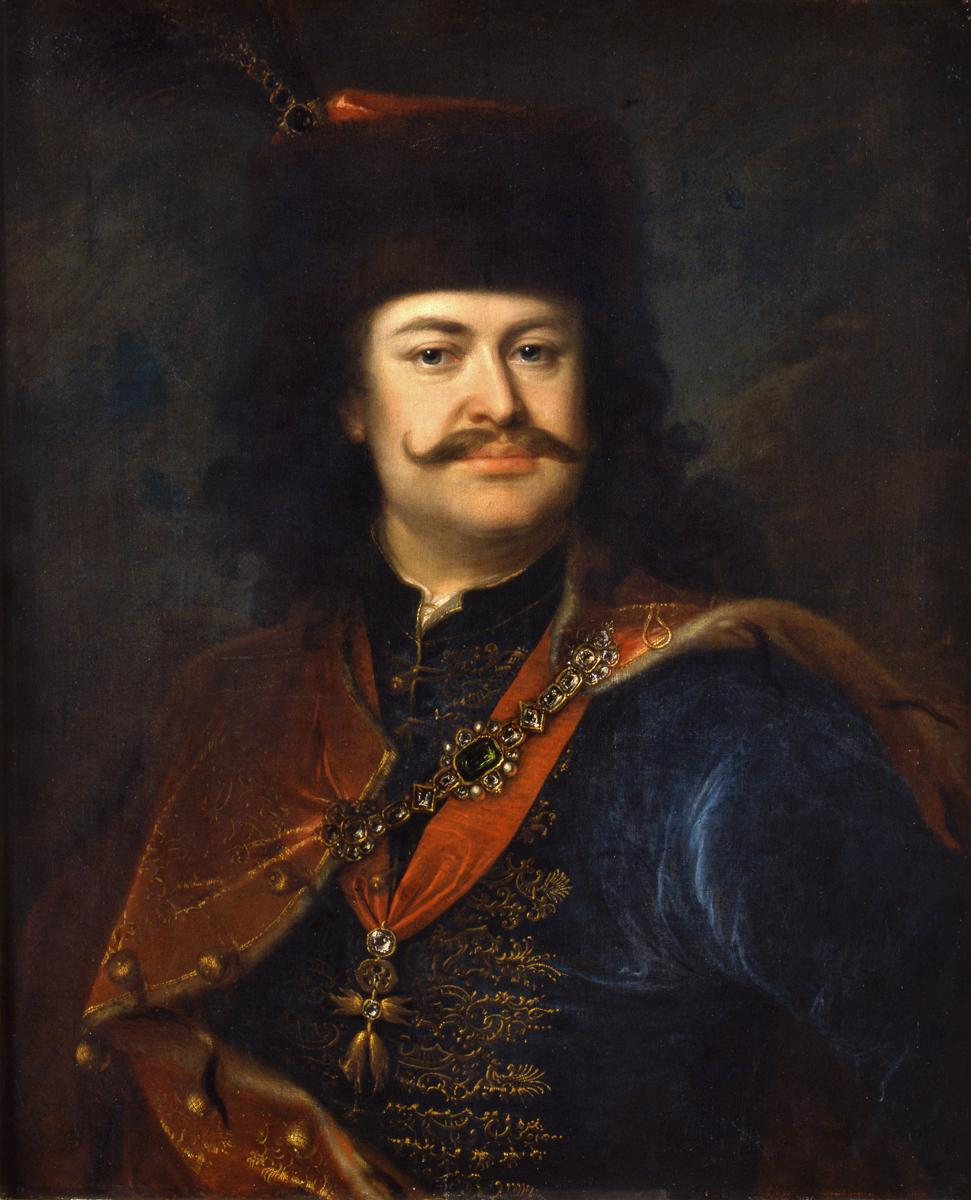
Francis Rákóczi, leader of the 1703–1711 Hungarian revolt; funded by France, this was a major distraction for Austria

The Imperial Diet formally declared Reichskrieg against France in November 1702. Despite being the dominant power within the Empire, Austrian and Imperial interests did not always coincide. The Habsburgs wanted to put Archduke Charles on the throne of an undivided Spanish monarchy, while their Allies were fighting to prevent either the Bourbons or the Habsburgs from doing so. This divergence and Austria's financial collapse in 1703 meant the campaign in Spain was reliant on Anglo-Dutch naval support and after 1706, British funding. Until the death of Joseph I in 1711, the Habsburg were unwilling to allocate resources to winning the war in Spain. Instead, their priorities were securing their southern borders by fighting France in northern Italy, and suppressing Rákóczi's War of Independence in Hungary.

The majority of the empire sided with the Emperor, with the exception of those states controlled by their Wittelsbach rivals. Bavaria, Liège, and Cologne allied with France, as did the Spanish-ruled Imperial states of Milan, the Spanish Netherlands and Mantua. Despite these defections, the Habsburgs were largely successful at mobilising Imperial resources, mustering an average strength of over 250,000.

However, even the larger entities within the Empire pursued their own policies. His claim to the Polish crown meant Augustus of Saxony focused on the Great Northern War, while Frederick I made his support dependent on Leopold recognising Prussia as a kingdom and making it an equal member of the Grand Alliance. Since the Elector of Hanover, was also heir to the British throne, his support was more reliable, but the suspicion remained that the interests of Hanover came first.

=== Britain ===
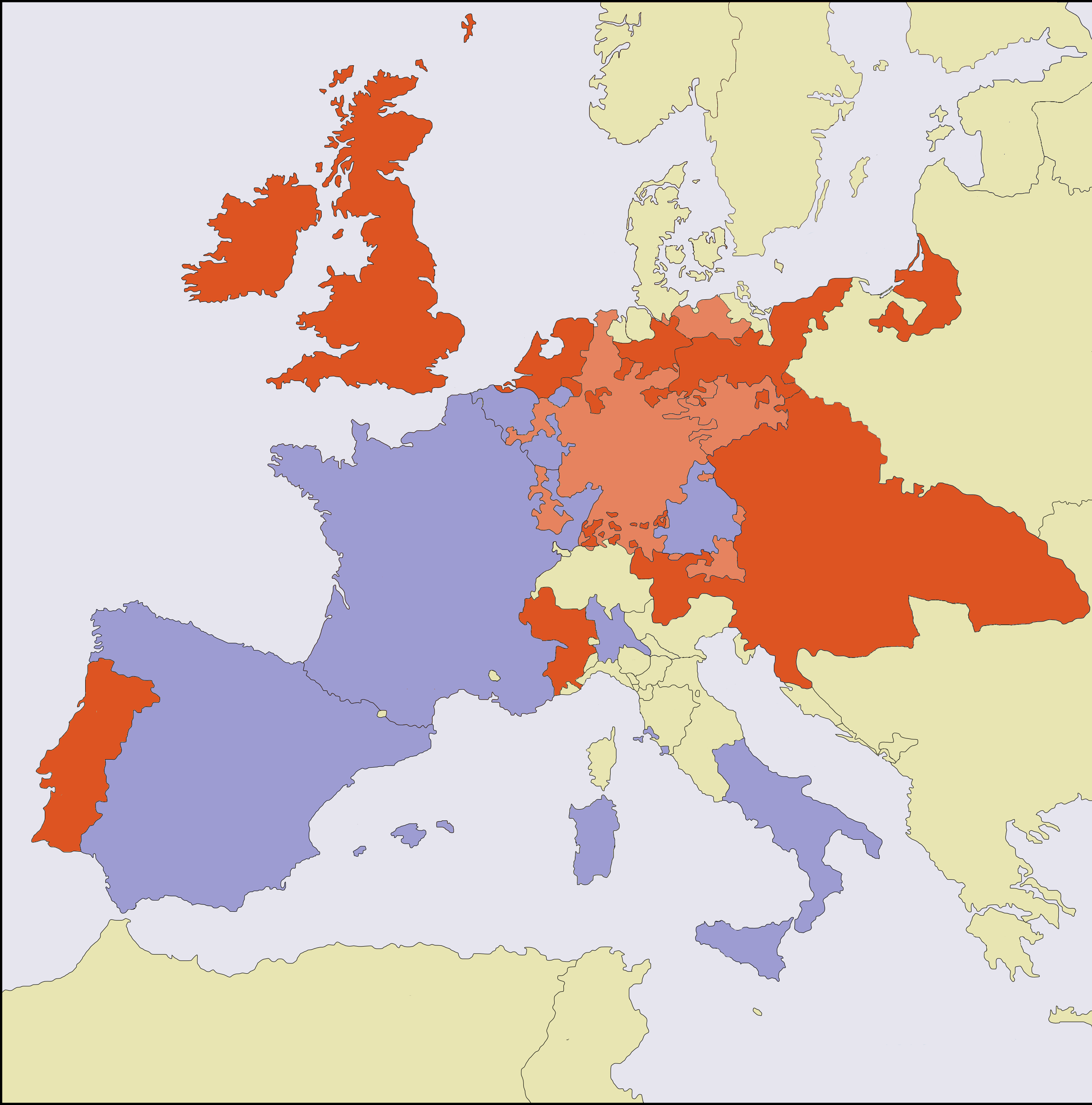
Participants in the War of the Spanish Succession in 1703: Pro-Habsburg (orange) and Pro-Bourbon (lavender)

British foreign policy was based on three general principles, which remained largely consistent from the 16th through the 20th centuries. The first, overriding all others, was to preserve a balance of power in Europe, an objective threatened by French expansion under Louis XIV. The second was to prevent the Low Countries from being controlled by a hostile power or one stronger than Britain; this included both the Spanish Netherlands and the Dutch Republic, whose deep harbours and prevailing winds made her a natural embarcation point for an attack on England, as demonstrated in 1688. The third was to maintain a navy strong enough to protect British trade, control her waters and launch attacks on her enemies' commercial routes and coastal areas.

Alignment on reducing the power of France and securing the Protestant succession for the British throne masked differences on how to achieve them. In general, the Tories favoured a mercantilist strategy of using the Royal Navy to attack French and Spanish trade while protecting and expanding their own; land commitments were viewed as expensive and primarily of benefit to others. The Whigs argued France could not be defeated by seapower alone, making a Continental strategy essential, while Britain's financial strength made it the only member of the Alliance able to operate on all fronts against France.

=== Dutch Republic ===
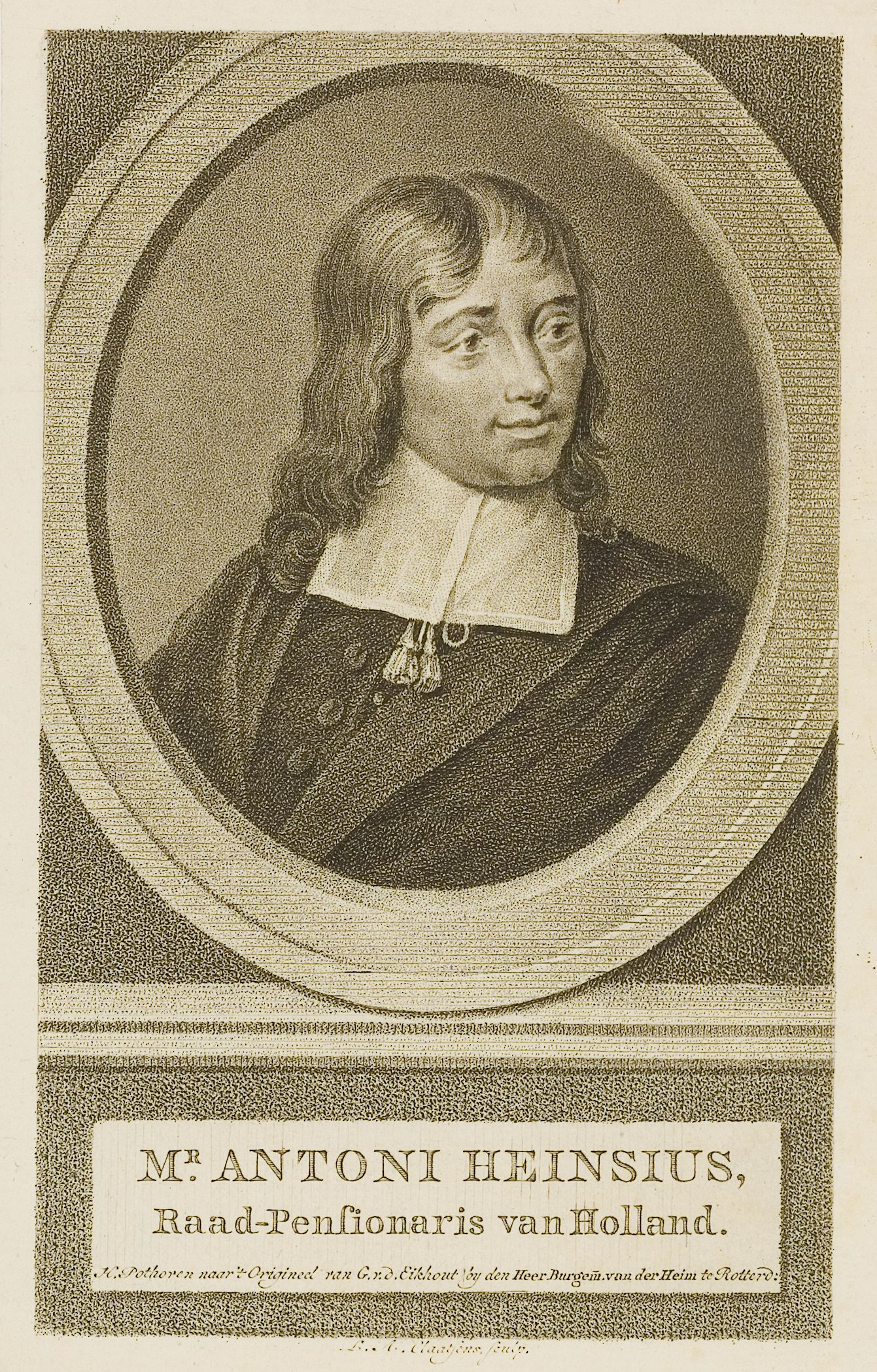
Anthonie Heinsius, Grand Pensionary

Under William of Orange, the Dutch Republic played a central role in organising European resistance to French expansionism. As the leading commercial power, the Dutch wanted to preserve the existing balance of power, and viewed the Spanish Netherlands as a key strategic buffer against French aggression. Since recent experience showed the Spanish could not defend them, the 1697 Treaty of Ryswick allowed the Dutch to place garrisons in eight key cities, providing strategic depth to protect their commercial and demographic heartlands against attack from the south. However, with the help of Maximilian of Bavaria, Governor of the Spanish Netherlands, by 1701 these garrisons had been nullified and replaced by French troops. At the request of the Elector of Cologne and Prince-bishop of Liège, Joseph Clemens of Bavaria, French troops also moved into his territories in the Rhineland and were thus directly threatening the Dutch border from both the south and the east. Dutch priorities were to secure their borders, re-establish and strengthen the Barrier fortresses, retain control of the economically vital Scheldt estuary, and gain access to trade in the Spanish Empire.

At the outset of the war, the Dutch States Army was the best prepared of the Grand Alliance, being similar in size to that of the Austrians, but of significantly higher quality. Although Marlborough was appointed commander of Allied forces in the Low Countries, the Dutch initially provided the bulk of troops and supplies. This made strategy in this theatre subject to the approval of their field deputies and generals. (Note: Athlone until 1703, Overkirk from 1704 to 1708 and Tilly from 1708.) When Dutch forces operated outside the Low Countries it was generally seen as a concession.

=== Savoy ===
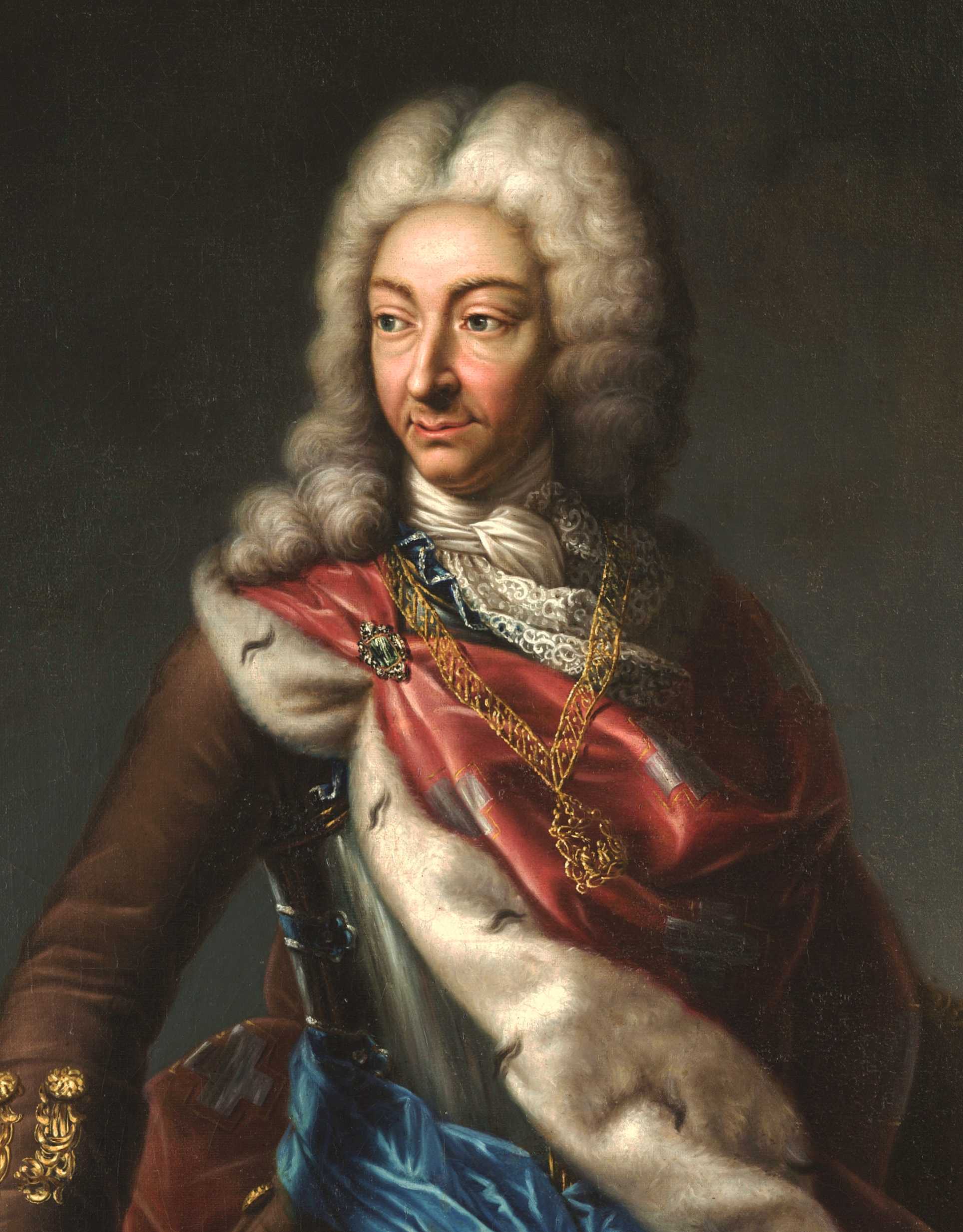
Victor Amadeus II, Duke of Savoy

Throughout the 17th century, Savoy sought to replace Spain as the dominant power in Northern Italy. Savoy consisted of two main geographic segments; Piedmont, which contained the capital Turin, and the Duchy of Aosta on the Italian side of the Alps, with the Duchy of Savoy and County of Nice in Transalpine France. The latter were almost impossible to defend and combined with the anti-Habsburg policy pursued by Louis XIV and his predecessors, this meant Savoy generally sided with France. However, Piedmont provided foreign powers access to the restive southern French provinces of the Dauphiné and Vaunage, former Huguenot strongholds with a long history of rebellion. This provided Victor Amadeus II with a degree of leverage, allowing him to manoeuvre between opposing parties to expand his territories.

During the Nine Years' War in 1690, Savoy joined the Grand Alliance before agreeing to a separate peace with France in 1696. The accession of Philip V in 1701 led to a reversal of long-standing strategic policy, with France now supporting the Spanish position in Lombardy, rather than seeking to weaken it, and Austria doing the opposite. While Victor Amadeus initially allied Savoy with France, his long-term goal was the acquisition of the Duchy of Milan, which neither Bourbons nor Habsburgs would relinquish voluntarily. As discussed elsewhere in this article, securing his borders in Italy was of greater concern to Emperor Leopold than Spain itself. This meant Britain was the only power inclined to help Victor Amadeus achieve this objective and he changed sides in 1703 after the Anglo-Dutch navies won control of the Western Mediterranean.

=== Portugal ===
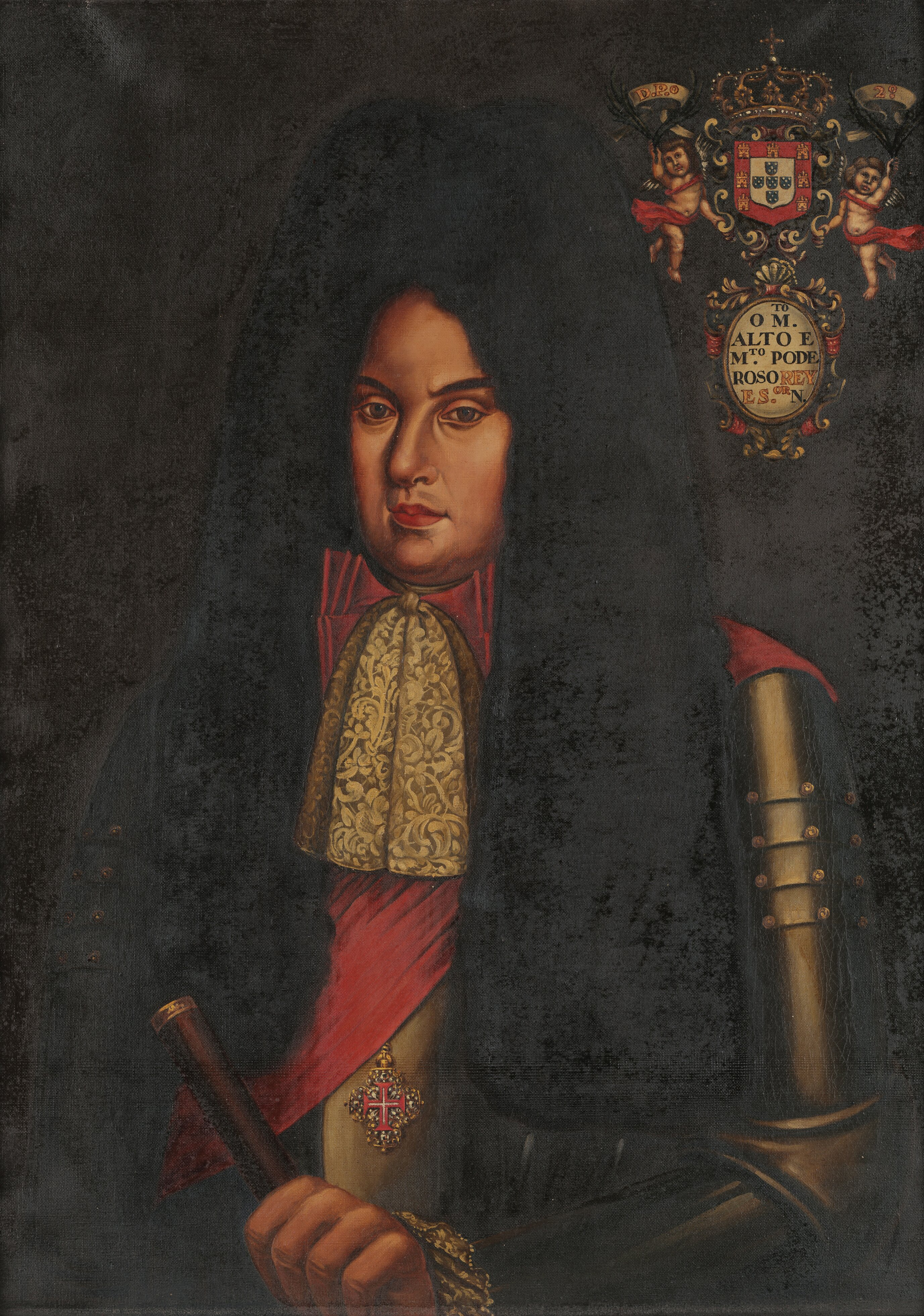
Peter II of Portugal

Portugal had regained its independence following the end of the Portuguese Restoration War in 1668, a result elements in Madrid had never entirely accepted. Peter II of Portugal viewed participation as a potential means of increasing his diplomatic standing in Europe, but Portuguese society was divided on which side to support. The British and Dutch navies posed a serious threat to their colonies, much of the mercantile class and aristocracy had considerable economic or cultural ties with France, while supporting Archduke Charles could result in another land invasion.

Peter wished to expand Colonial Brazil to the Río de la Plata and Oyapock, while securing his land borders in Europe by acquiring Badajoz and Valencia de Alcántara from Spain, along with a number of smaller towns. As the Allies refused to support these demands, Portugal initially aligned with Philip V in exchange for naval support. However, when it became clear the new regime harboured ambitions of recapturing Portugal, and failed to produce a fleet capable of challenging the Allies, Portugal joined the Grand Alliance in May 1703.

== Military campaigns; 1701–1708 ==
=== Italy ===
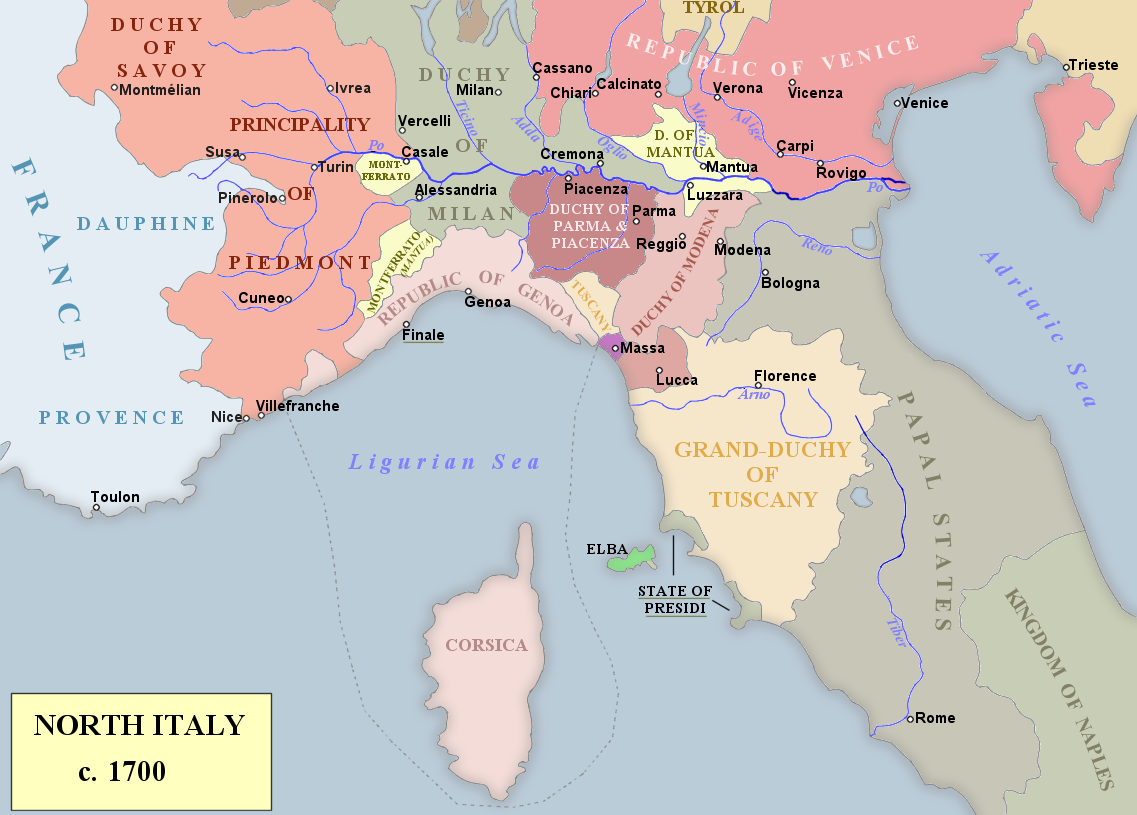
Northern Italy; Milan, Savoy, and Mantua were the primary areas of conflict

The war in Italy primarily involved the Spanish-ruled Duchy of Milan and the French-allied Duchy of Mantua, considered essential to the security of Austria's southern borders. In 1701, French troops occupied both cities and Victor Amadeus II, Duke of Savoy, allied with France, his daughter Maria Luisa marrying Philip V. In May 1701, an Imperial army under Prince Eugene of Savoy moved into Northern Italy; by February 1702, victories at Carpi, Chiari and Cremona forced the French behind the Adda river.

Louis Joseph, Duke of Vendôme, one of the best French generals, took command and was substantially reinforced; Prince Eugene managed a draw at the Battle of Luzzara but the French recovered most of the territory that it had lost to Prince Eugene the year before. In October 1703, Victor Amadeus declared war on France; by May 1706, the French held most of Savoy except Turin while victories at Cassano and Calcinato forced the Imperialists into the Trentino valley.

In July 1706 Vendôme and all the forces that could be spared were sent to reinforce France's northern frontier after the defeat at Ramillies. Reinforced by German auxiliaries led by Leopold of Anhalt-Dessau, Prince Eugene broke the siege of Turin in September; despite a minor French victory at Castiglione, the war in Italy was over. To the fury of his allies, the 1707 Convention of Milan Emperor Joseph gave French troops in Lombardy free passage to Southern France.

A combined Savoyard-Imperial attack on the French base of Toulon planned for April was postponed when Imperial troops were diverted to seize the Spanish Bourbon Kingdom of Naples. By the time they besieged Toulon in August, the French were too strong, and they were forced to withdraw. By the end of 1707, fighting in Italy ceased, apart from minor attempts by Victor Amadeus to recover Nice and Savoy.

=== Low Countries, Rhine, and Danube ===
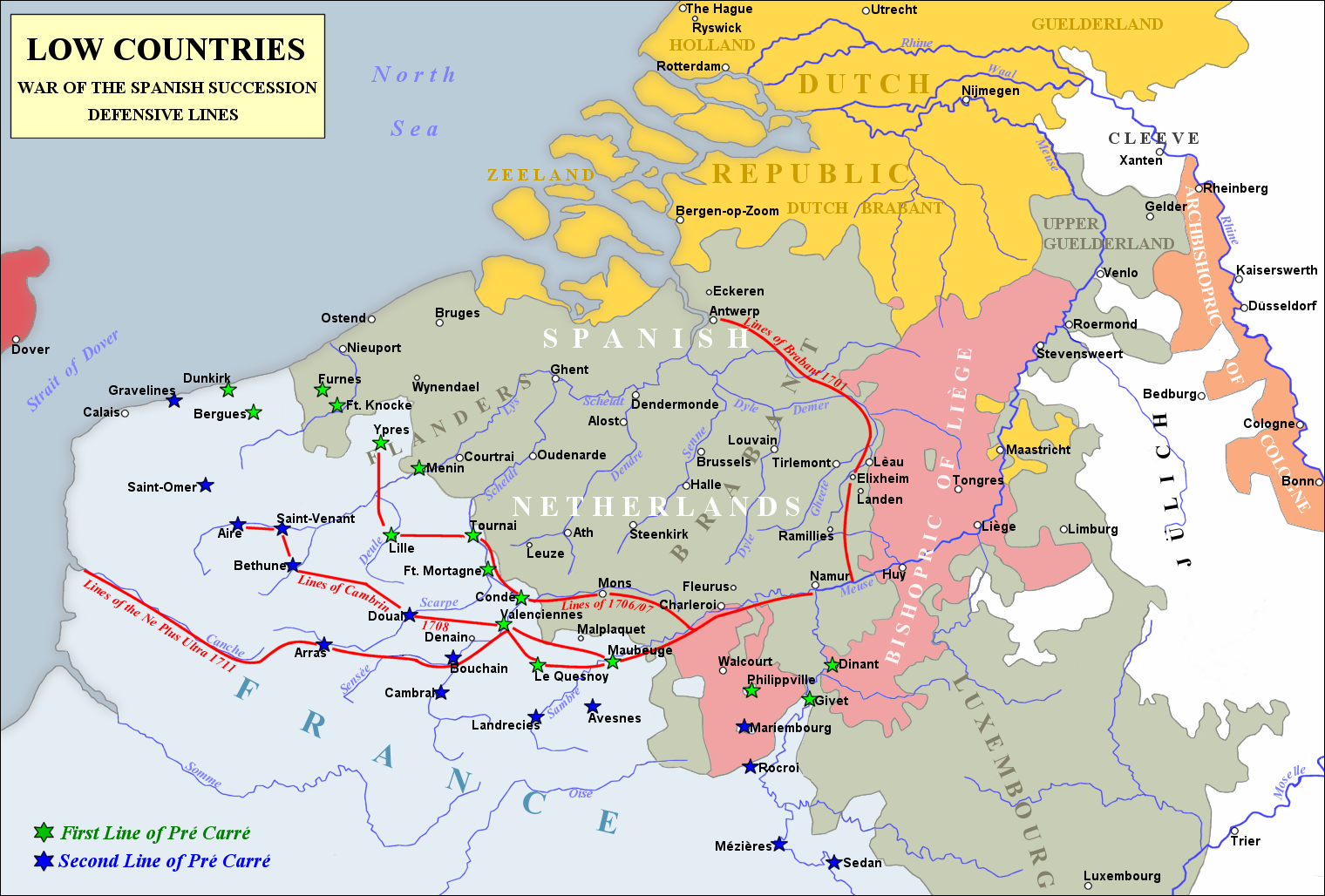
Low Countries; note the location of Prince-Bishopric of Liège (in pink). Red lines show the pré carré, a double line of fortresses guarding the French border.

The first objective for the Grand Alliance in this theatre was to secure the Dutch frontiers, threatened by the alliance between France, Bavaria, and Joseph Clemens of Bavaria, ruler of Liège and Cologne. In early 1702 the Grand Alliance repelled an assault on Nijmegen and captured Kaiserswerth, a strong town along the Rhine on the eastern side of the Dutch Republic. The Allies then advanced into the Meuse valley, taking Venlo, Roermond, and Stevensweert, and concluding the campaign with the capture of Liège. The 1703 campaign was marred by Allied conflicts over strategy. Despite capturing Bonn, they failed to take Antwerp, while a Dutch contingent narrowly escaped disaster at Ekeren in June.

On the Upper Rhine, Imperial forces under Louis William, Margrave of Baden-Baden remained on the defensive, although they took Landau in 1702. Supported by the Bavarians, during the 1703 campaign French forces retook Landau, won victories at Friedlingen, Höchstädt and Speyerbach, then captured Kehl and Breisach. With Austrian resources absorbed by Rákóczi's War of Independence in Hungary, the Franco-Bavarian plan for 1704 was to march on Vienna. To relieve the pressure, Marlborough marched up the Rhine, joined forces with Louis of Baden and Prince Eugene, and crossed the Danube on 2 July. Allied victory at Blenheim on 13 August forced Bavaria out of the war and the Treaty of Ilbersheim placed it under Austrian rule.

Allied efforts to exploit their victory at Eliksem in 1705 floundered on poor coordination, tactical disputes, and command rivalries. A diplomatic crisis between the Dutch Republic and England was only averted by the dismissal of General Slangenburg, while the imposition of Austrian rule in Bavaria caused a brief but vicious peasant revolt. In May 1706, the French were comprehensively defeated at Ramillies by an Allied army under Marlborough, which then occupied much of the Spanish Netherlands in under two weeks. France assumed a largely defensive posture for the rest of the war.

The 1707 campaign was without any significant events, as both parties focussed on other fronts. The French, now under Marshal Vendôme, avoided battle and Marlborough did little to force one upon them. By 1708, the focus of both sides was again almost entirely on the fighting in the Low Countries. The allies once more set their sights on breaking French fortification belts, while the French themselves planned a counteroffensive. The French operation had early success when the French surprised the Allied garrisons at Ghent and Bruges, it failed after the Allies defeated them at the Battle of Oudenaarde. (Note: This was in part possible due to the help from Flemish citizens who were dissatisfied with their new Anglo-Dutch rulers.) In its aftermath the Allies managed to capture Lille, the strongest fortress of the French fortress belts, while a French assault on Brussels was repelled and Ghent and Bruges recaptured. Despite losses like Lille and other strongpoints, the French prevented the Allies from making an irreparable breach in their frontiers.

=== Spain and Portugal ===
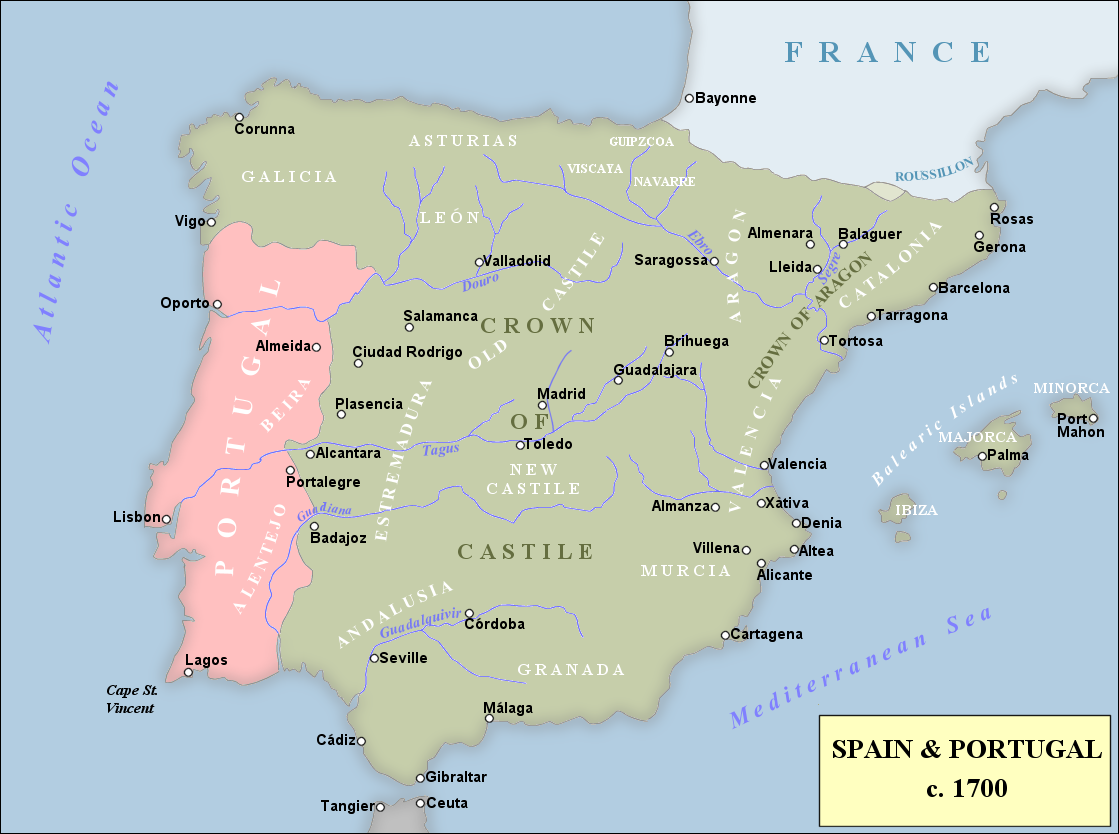
Peninsular Spain, depicting the crowns of Castile and Aragon and their respective kingdoms

British involvement was primarily driven by the need to protect their trade routes in the Mediterranean. By putting Archduke Charles on the Spanish throne, they also hoped to gain commercial privileges within the Spanish Empire. Despite their dynastic claim, the Austrian Habsburgs viewed securing Northern Italy and suppressing the Hungarian revolt as higher priorities. With the Dutch focusing on Flanders post-1704, this theatre was largely dependent on British naval and military support.

Spain at the time was a personal union between the Crowns of Castile and Aragon. The latter was at the same time a personal union of the Principality of Catalonia and the kingdoms of Aragon, Valencia, Majorca, Sicily, Naples, and Sardinia. In 1701, Majorca, Naples, Sicily, and Sardinia declared for Philip, while a mixture of anti-Castilian and anti-French sentiment meant the others supported Archduke Charles, the most important being Catalonia. Allied victory at Vigo Bay in October 1702 persuaded Peter II of Portugal to switch sides, giving them an operational base in this area.

Archduke Charles landed at Lisbon in March 1704 to begin a land campaign, while the Anglo-Dutch capture of Gibraltar was a significant blow to Bourbon prestige. An attempt to retake it was defeated in August, with a land siege being abandoned in April 1705. The 1705 Pact of Genoa between Catalan representatives and Britain opened a second front in the north-east; the loss of Barcelona and Valencia left Toulon as the only major port available to the Bourbons in the Western Mediterranean. Philip tried to retake Barcelona in May 1706 but was repulsed, while his absence allowed an Allied force from Portugal to enter Madrid and Zaragoza. Meanwhile, Charles convened in Barcelona the last General Court of Catalonia (the parliament). In exchange for the modernisation of the Catalan constitutional system passed by the Courts, the monarch obtained the recognition, as well as military and economic assistance, of the Principality of Catalonia.

However, lack of popular support and logistical issues meant the Allies could not hold territory away from the coastline, and by November, Philip controlled Castile, Murcia, and parts of Valencia. Allied efforts to regain the initiative ended with defeat at Almansa in April 1707, followed by an unsuccessful siege of Toulon in August. Despite these failures, control of Gibraltar and the capture of Menorca in 1708 allowed the Royal Navy to dominate the Western Mediterranean. Since many British politicians considered this their primary objective, they became reluctant to approve further expensive land campaigns in this theatre.

=== War beyond Europe and related conflicts ===
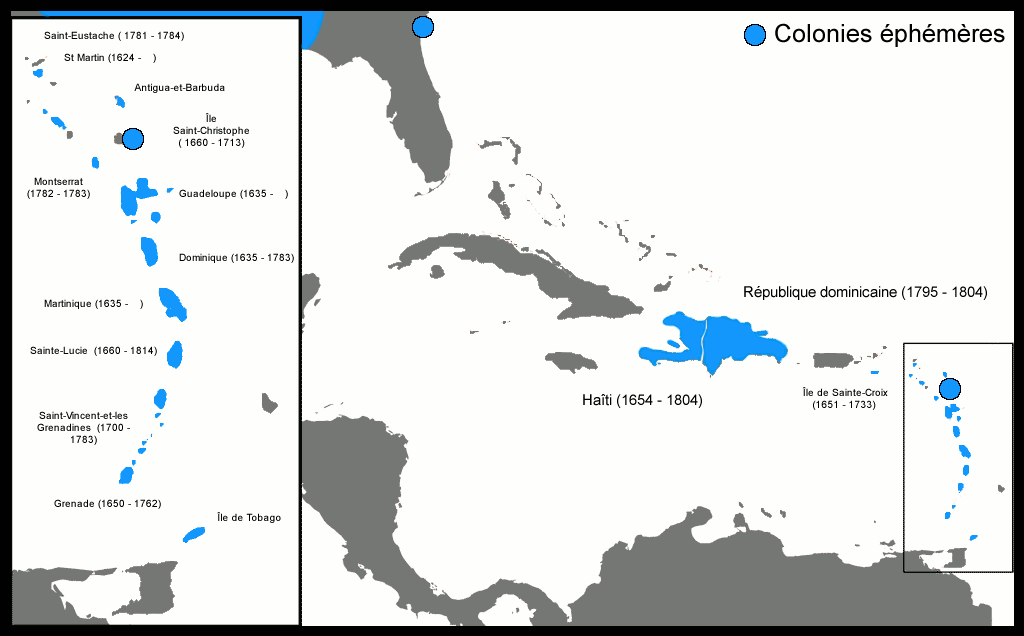
The French West Indies; the huge profits associated with sugar production made this area highly significant.

The close links between war and trade meant conflict extended beyond Europe, particularly in North America, where it is known as Queen Anne's War, and the West Indies, which produced sugar, then a hugely profitable commodity. Also, there were minor trade conflicts in South America, India, and Asia; the financial strains of war particularly affected the Dutch East India Company, as it was a huge drain on scarce naval resources. The war in Europe also coincided with Dutch involvement in the War of Javanese Succession.

Related conflicts include Rákóczi's War of Independence in Hungary, which was funded by France and a serious concern for the Habsburgs throughout the war. In South-Eastern France, Britain funded the Huguenot 1704–1710 Camisard rebellion; one objective of the 1707 campaign in Northern Italy and Southern France was to support this revolt, one of a series that began in the 1620s.

== Towards peace; 1709–1715 ==
By the end of 1708, the French had withdrawn from Northern Italy, while the maritime powers controlled the Spanish Netherlands, and secured the borders of the Dutch Republic; in the Mediterranean, the maritime powers had achieved naval supremacy, and Britain acquired permanent bases in Gibraltar and Menorca. However, as Marlborough himself pointed out, the French frontiers remained largely intact, their army showed no signs of being defeated, while Philip proved far more popular with the Spanish than his rival. Many of the objectives set out by the Grand Alliance in 1701 had been achieved, but success in 1708 made them overconfident.

=== Diplomacy and renewed war ===
French diplomats focused on the Dutch, whom they considered more likely to favour peace, since victory at Ramillies had removed any direct military threat to the Republic, while highlighting differences with Britain on the Spanish Netherlands. Peace talks had broken down in late 1708 because the Allies could not agree joint terms. The Great Frost of 1709 caused widespread famine in France and Spain, forcing Louis to re-open negotiations, who now hinted at his willingness to cede French fortresses to the Dutch Republic.

In May 1709 the Allies presented him with the preliminaries of the Hague. Britain and Austria still insisted on an undivided Spanish monarchy for Archduke Charles. The Allies demanded that Philip was given two months to cede his throne to Charles, while France was required to remove him by force if he did not comply, besides having to cede the strongholds, Thionville, Cambrai and Valenciennes as collateral. Although Spain was of less importance to them, the Dutch negotiators, led by Heinsius, considered these strict conditions necessary to ensure that peace conditions were honoured, as they doubted Louis' sincerity. They were concerned the Allies might exhaust themselves in Spain, while allowing France to recover, and potentially back Phillip once again.

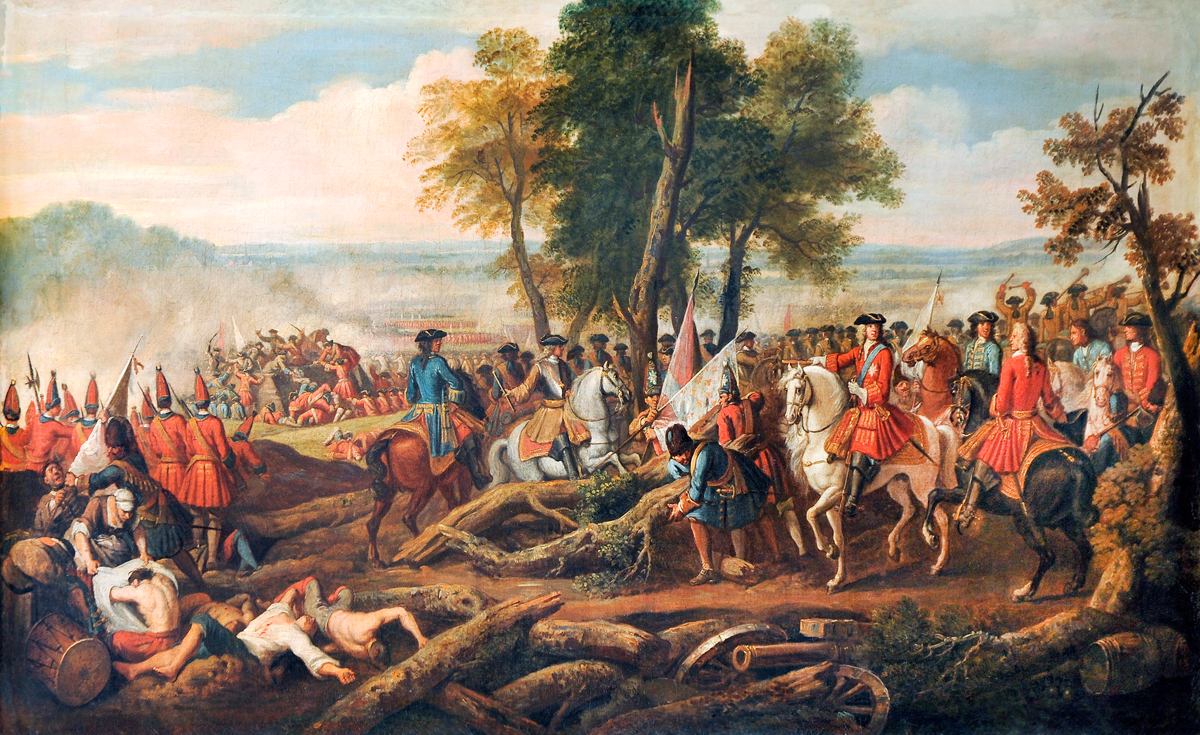
Battle of Malplaquet, 1709: an Allied victory, the losses shocked Europe and increased the desire for peace.

Many Allied statesmen, including Marlborough, felt the terms assumed Philip would abdicate on request, and seriously underestimated France's ability to continue the war. They also required the Spanish to accept Archduke Charles as king in his place, which they were certainly unwilling to do, as demonstrated by the failure of Allied campaigns to hold territory outside Catalonia. Although Louis seemed willing to abandon his ambitions in Spain, making war on his grandson was unacceptable, a stipulation so offensive that the French resolved to fight on when it was made public.

Following the capture of Tournai, Marlborough's 1709 offensive in northern France culminated in the Battle of Malplaquet on 11 September, a hard-fought Allied victory with heavy casualties on both sides. Although the battle did not improve the French strategic position, it showed their fighting abilities were intact and increased war-weariness in both Britain and the Dutch Republic. The impact was magnified by Franco-Spanish victories at Alicante in April, and La Gudina in May 1709, which made prospects of an Allied victory in Spain increasingly remote.

Shortly after, the Dutch discovered they had been excluded from a commercial agreement signed by Archduke Charles giving Britain exclusive trading rights in Spanish America. This deepened divisions between the Allies while increasing Spanish opposition to having the Archduke as their king. The Whig government in London was afraid to push the Dutch into the hands of the French and went back on their commercial agreement with Archduke Charles. In exchange for a Dutch guarantee to support the Hanoverian succession, Britain agreed to share trading rights in Spanish America and the Mediterranean. The Whigs promised the Dutch a significantly expanded barrier in the Spanish Netherlands, including fortress towns such as Lille, Valenciennes, Condé and Maubeuge. The Dutch now seemed to obtain all they had ever wanted from the war, in the Low Countries, the Mediterranean and America. This treaty sparked resentment from Emperor Joseph, who was offended by the heavy burden it imposed on his brother's sovereignty over the Southern Netherlands, while they were also opposed by the Tory opposition in Britain who saw them as detrimental to British commerce.

The Whigs had won the 1708 British general election by arguing military victory was the quickest road to peace, but failure in France was mirrored in Spain. Archduke Charles re-entered Madrid in 1710 after victories at Almenar and Saragossa, but the Allies could not hold the interior and were forced to retreat. 3,500 British troops surrendered at Brihuega on 8 December, while the Battle of Villaviciosa on 10 December confirmed Bourbon control of Spain. At the same time, costs continued to rise; the Dutch were close to bankruptcy while Austrian troops were almost entirely funded by Britain. In 1709, Parliament approved expenditures of £6.4 million was up from £5.0 million in 1706; by the end of 1710, these had doubled to £12.9 million, despite minimal gains.

=== Negotiations ===
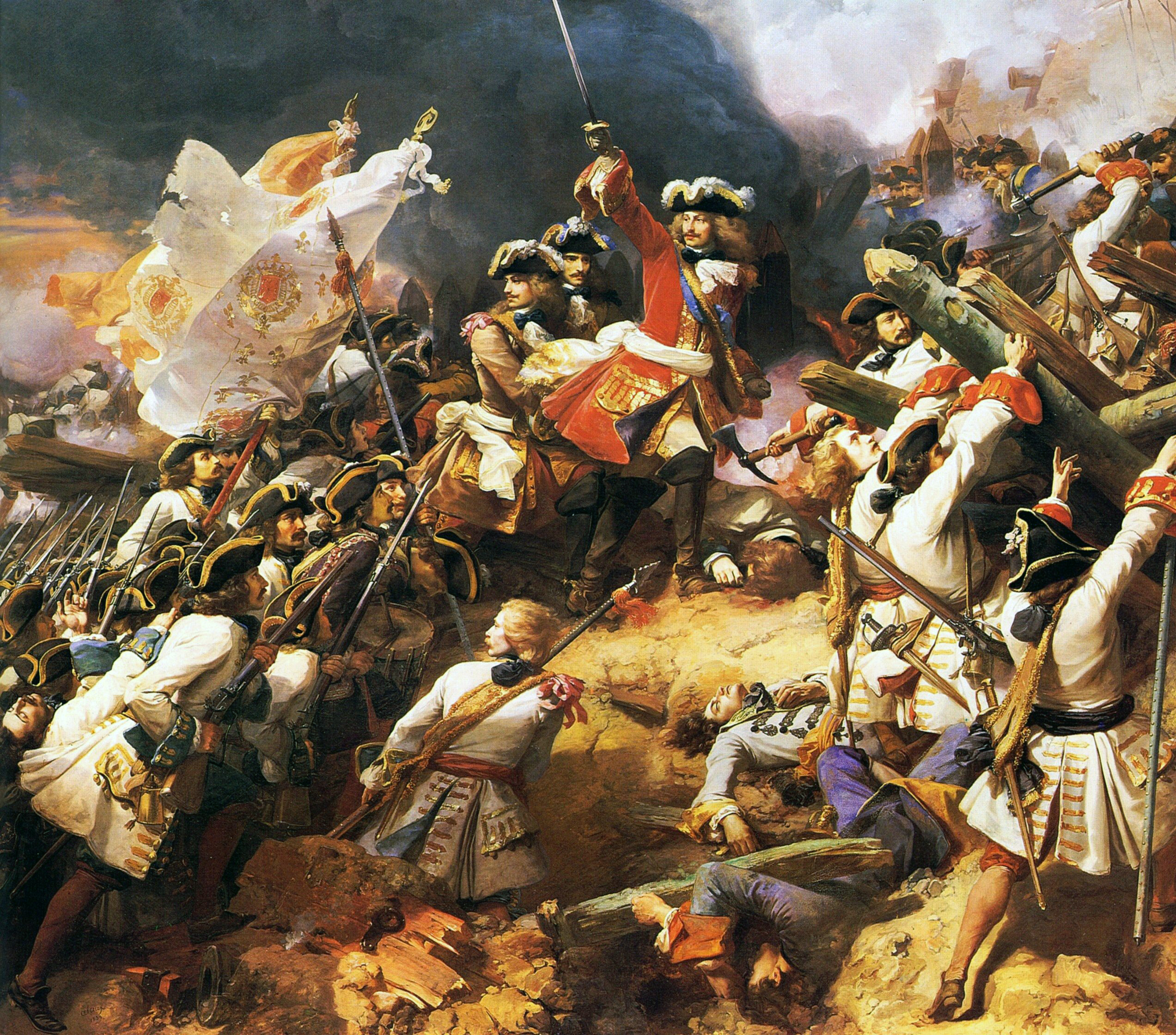
Battle of Denain, July 1712; defeat ended Austrian and Dutch hopes of improving their negotiating position.

When talks resumed at Geertruidenberg in March 1710, Louis now even showed a willingness to assist the Allies in removing his grandson from Spain. The Dutch proposed compensating Philip with Sicily and Sardinia, but neither the Austrians or British would agree, and negotiations broke down again. However, it was clear to the French the mood in Britain had changed. This was confirmed when the pro-peace Tories won a landslide victory in the October 1710 British election, although they confirmed their commitment to the war to prevent a credit crisis. Despite the capture of Bouchain in September, a decisive victory in northern France continued to elude the Allies, while an attack on Quebec ended in disaster.

When Emperor Joseph died in April 1711, his brother Archduke Charles was elected emperor. For the Dutch and British, his accession undermined a key reason for continuing the war, since a union of Spain with Austria was as unwelcome as one with France. The British secretly negotiated peace terms directly with France, leading to the signing of the Preliminary Articles of London on 8 October 1711. (Note: Also known as the Mesnager Convention.)

These included French acceptance of the Act of Settlement 1701 and a guarantee the French and Spanish crowns would remain separate. In addition, France undertook to ensure Spain ceded Gibraltar and Menorca, while giving Britain a thirty-year monopoly on the Asiento de Negros, the right to import slaves into Spanish American colonies. Despite their resentment at being excluded from these talks, the Dutch were financially exhausted by the war, and could not continue without British support. Charles VI initially rejected the idea of a peace conference, only agreeing once the Dutch decided to support it, but continued to oppose the treaty.

=== Peace of Utrecht ===
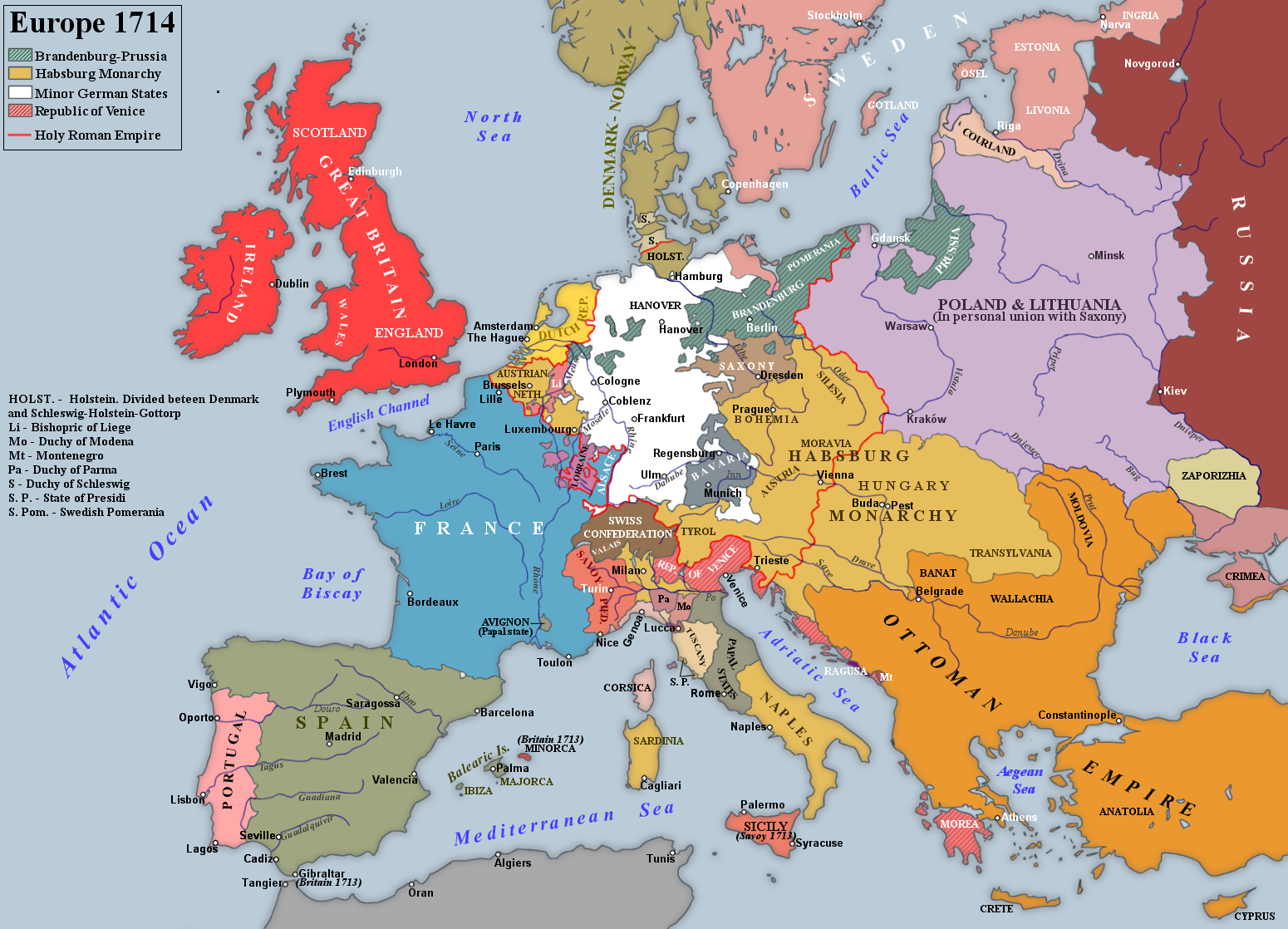
Western Europe in 1714, after the Treaties of Utrecht and Rastatt

Within weeks of the conference opening, events threatened the basis of the peace agreed between Britain and France. First, the French presented proposals awarding the Spanish Netherlands to Max Emmanuel of Bavaria and a minimal Barrier, leaving the Dutch with little to show for their huge investment of money and men. Second, a series of deaths left Louis XIV's two-year-old great-grandson, the future Louis XV as heir, making Philip next in line and his immediate renunciation imperative.

The Dutch and Austrians fought on, hoping to improve their negotiating position but the new British government ordered Marlborough's replacement, James Butler, 2nd Duke of Ormonde, not to participate in offensive operations against the French. These orders caused fury then and later, with Whigs urging Hanoverian military intervention. Those considered responsible, including Ormonde and the Tory statesman Henry St John, 1st Viscount Bolingbroke, were driven into exile when George I succeeded Queen Anne in 1714, and became prominent Jacobites.

A combined Austro-Dutch army under Prince Eugene captured Le Quesnoy in June, before besieging Landrecies, a key stronghold in France's final defensive line. However, they were defeated at Denain on 24 July, then went on to recapture Le Quesnoy, Marchines, Douai, and Bouchain. This demonstrated the continued ability of the French army, while the Dutch had finally reached the end of their willingness and ability to continue the war.

On 6 June, Philip confirmed his renunciation of the French throne, and the British offered the Dutch a revised Barrier Treaty, replacing that of 1709 which they rejected as overly generous. Although subject to Austrian approval, it was still a significant improvement on that agreed in 1697, and was sufficient for the Dutch to agree. Despite this, negotiations dragged on until 1715, as the Austrians were reluctant to pay for Dutch garrisons stationed in their territory, although British pressure meant the issue was ultimately concluded in favour of the Dutch.

Emperor Charles withdrew from negotiations when France insisted he guarantee not to acquire Mantua or Mirandola. He was supported in this by the future George I, who wanted France to withdraw backing for the Stuart heir James Francis. As a result, neither Austria nor the Emperor signed the Peace of Utrecht of 11 April 1713 between France and the other Allies; Spain made peace with the Dutch in June, then Savoy and Britain on 13 July 1713.

=== Treaties of Rastatt and Baden ===
Fighting continued on the Rhine, but Austria was financially exhausted and after the loss of Landau and Freiburg in November 1713, Charles finally made peace on 7 March 1714. In the Treaty of Rastatt, the Habsburg monarchy acceded to the terms of Utrecht, which confirmed their gains in Southern Italy, returned Breisach, Kehl, and Freiburg, ended French support for the Hungarian revolt and agreed on terms for the Dutch Barrier fortresses. Charles abandoned his claim to Strasbourg and Alsace and agreed to the restoration of the Wittelsbach electors of Bavaria and Cologne, Max Emmanuel and Joseph Clemens, lifting the Imperial ban on them. Article XIX of the treaty transferred sovereignty over the Spanish Netherlands to Austria. On 7 September, the Holy Roman Empire joined the agreement by the Treaty of Baden, the war was over; although the Principality of Catalonia, by vote of its Council of Estates in order to protect Catalan constitutions and lives from the expected repression, remained in war against Bourbon Spain and France, alongside the Kingdom of Majorca in a separate conflict known as the War of the Catalans (1713-1714), and were not finally subdued by the Bourbons until respectively, September 1714 (the fall of Barcelona) and June 1715.

== Aftermath ==
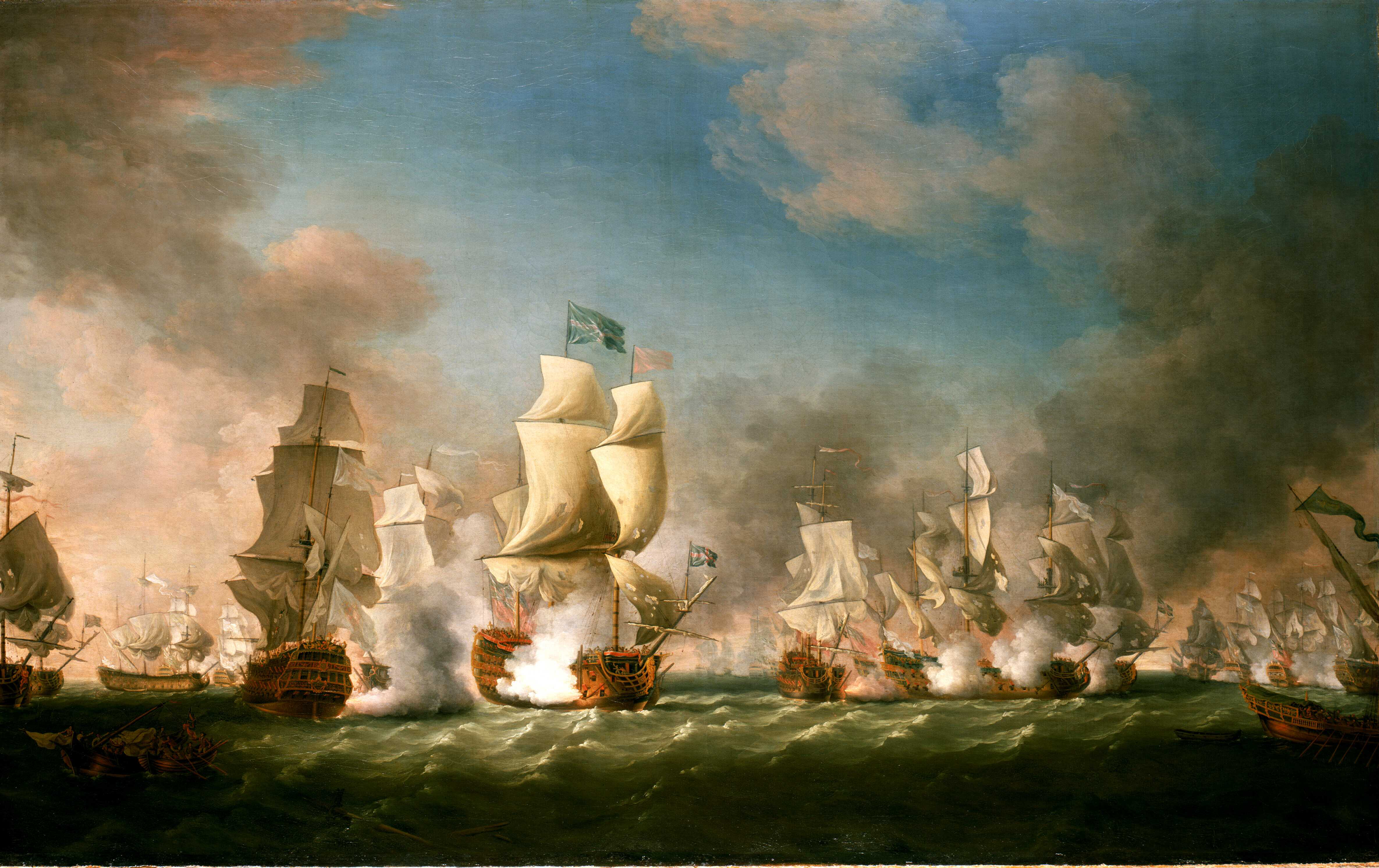
The Royal Navy defeats a Spanish fleet off Sicily, Cape Passaro, August 1718

Article II of the Peace of Utrecht included the stipulation "because of the great danger which threatened the liberty and safety of all Europe, from the too-close conjunction of the kingdoms of Spain and France, ... the same person should never become King of both kingdoms." Some historians view this as a key point in the evolution of the modern nation-state; Randall Lesaffer argues it marks a significant milestone in the concept of collective security.

=== Spain ===
Philip was confirmed as king of Spain, which retained its independence and the majority of its empire, in return for ceding the Spanish Netherlands, most of its Italian possessions, as well as Gibraltar and Menorca. Naples and Sicily were regained in 1735 and Menorca in 1782. The 1707-1716 Nueva Planta decrees centralised power in Madrid, and abolished the political structures of the Crown of Aragon and its states, although Catalonia and Majorca remained outside the trade system until 1767. Their economy recovered remarkably quickly, and the House of Bourbon (save for brief interruptions) has held the Spanish throne ever since.

=== France ===
Louis XIV died on 1 September 1715, and was succeeded by his five-year-old great-grandson Louis XV; on his deathbed, he is alleged to have admitted, "I have loved war too well." True or not, the final settlement was far more favourable than the Allied terms of 1709.

France retained Landau and was awarded the Principality of Orange and Ubaye Valley. More importantly, by placing a Bourbon on the Spanish throne, Louis XIV ended roughly two centuries of Habsburg encirclement around the borders of his kingdom. From 1666 onward French policies assumed economic superiority over their rivals, but this was no longer the case by 1714 when Britain appeared to have overtaken France on this front. The continued widening of this gap as British trade expanded post-Utrecht was viewed by Louis's successors as a permanent threat to the European balance of power. Seeking to reduce this was a major factor in France entering the 1740–1748 War of the Austrian Succession.

=== Austria and the Holy Roman Empire ===
Despite failure in Spain, Austria secured its position in Italy and Hungary and acquired the bulk of the former Spanish Netherlands. Even after reimbursing the Dutch for their Barrier garrisons, increased revenues from the Austrian Netherlands funded a significant expansion of the Austrian army. With the acquisition of Milan, Mantua, Naples and Sardinia, Austria gained a dominant position in Italy that largely continued until 1859. Victory in the Austro-Turkish War of 1716–1718 accentuated the shift of Habsburg focus into Southern Europe and away from Germany, where they were increasingly challenged by Bavaria, Hanover, Prussia, and Saxony. In 1742, Charles of Bavaria became the first non-Habsburg Emperor in over 300 years.

=== Great Britain ===
Britain emerged as the leading European naval and commercial power with the acquisition of the strategic Mediterranean ports of Gibraltar and Menorca, as well as trading rights in Spanish America. France accepted the Protestant succession, ensuring a smooth inheritance by George I in August 1714, while agreeing to end support for the Stuarts in the 1716 Anglo-French Treaty. Although the war left all participants with unprecedented levels of government debt, Britain was able to finance it efficiently, providing a relative advantage over its competitors.

=== Dutch Republic ===
The Barrier fortresses as agreed in 1715, corresponding to the modern borders of Belgium

The Dutch had recovered and expanded their positions in the Southern Netherlands, and their troops were central to the alliance which halted French territorial expansion in Europe until a new cycle began in 1792. But the war left them bankrupt, and inflicted permanent damage on the Dutch merchant navy; while they remained the dominant economic power in the Far East, Britain took over as the pre-eminent global commercial and maritime power. The exhaustion of the Dutch admiralties had also allowed the pirates from Algiers to capture numerous Dutch merchant vessels, which the Dutch were only able to stop after a long conflict. The Barrier Treaty fortresses became the central driver of Dutch foreign policy in the decades after 1713 and were put to the test during the War of the Austrian Succession. (Note: Although judged favourably by contemporaries, modern historians still argue about the true effectiveness of the barrier fortresses, since they were conquered by France during the War of the Austrian Succession. Advocates instead emphasise that it took 3 years of campaigning for the French to conquer all barrier fortresses and that the purpose of the barrier was to give the Dutch enough time to mobilize and fortify their borders. According to them, nobody in the Dutch Republic was under the illusion that the barrier would stop French armies.)

=== Portugal ===
While Portugal did not obtain all the desired territorial concessions in South America and the Iberian Peninsula, France relinquished its claims on the northern banks of the Amazon River, which were thus integrated into Brazil, and Spain returned the Colonia del Sacramento, which had been lost during the conflict. More importantly however, Portugal emerged on a better diplomatic footing among the powers of Europe and more closely associated with Britain, thus clearly demonstrating to Spain that its independence was beyond question. The border regions were devastated, however, and after the war, Portugal resumed a policy of neutrality that afforded the Portuguese fifty years of peace to focus on its territories overseas and reap the benefits of trade.

=== Other ===
Wider implications include the rise of Prussia and Savoy while many of the participants were involved in the 1700–1721 Great Northern War, with Russia becoming a major European power for the first time as a result. Finally, while colonial conflicts were relatively minor and largely confined to the North American theatre, the so-called Queen Anne's War, they were to become a key element in future wars. Meanwhile, maritime unemployment brought on by the war's end led to the third stage of the Golden Age of Piracy, as many sailors formerly employed in the navies of the warring powers turned to piracy for survival.

== Claims to the Spanish throne ==
Family tree of claimants to the Spanish throne following the death of Charles II

Philip III; King of Spain; 1578–1621	Margaret of Austria; 1584–1611
Ferdinand III; Holy Roman Emperor; 1608–1657	Maria Anna of Spain; 1606–1646
Anne of Austria; 1601–1666	Elisabeth of France; 1602–1644	Philip IV; King of Spain; 1605–1665	Mariana of Austria; 1635–1696
Louis XIV; King of France; 1638–1715	Maria Theresa of Spain; 1638–1683	Charles II; King of Spain; 1661–1700	Margaret Theresa of Spain; 1651–1673	Leopold I Holy Roman Emperor; 1640–1705	Eleonore Magdalene of Neuburg; 1655–1720
Louis; Grand Dauphin of France; 1661–1711	Maria Antonia of Austria; 1669–1692	Charles VI; Holy Roman Emperor; 1685–1740
Louis; Petit Dauphin of France; 1682–1712	Philip V King of Spain; 1683–1746	Charles; Duke of Berry; 1686–1714	Joseph Ferdinand of Bavaria; 1692–1699

Notes
Potential heirs are shown with a golden border. In cases of second marriages, the earlier spouse is to the left and the later to the right.
References
- Durant, W.; Durant, A. (2011). The Age of Louis XIV: The Story of Civilization. New York: Simon & Schuster. ISBN 9781451647655.
- Kamen, H. (2001). Philip V of Spain: The King Who Reigned Twice. New Haven: Yale University Press. ISBN 9780300180541.

== See also ==
- Decline of Spain
- International relations (1648–1814)
- Madeleine Caulier

== Sources ==
- Van Alphen, Marc; Hoffenaar, Jan; Lemmers, Alan; Van der Spek, Christiaan (2021). Military Power And The Dutch Republic: War, Trade and the Balance of Power in Europe, 1648–1813. Boom. ISBN 978-9087283650.
- Anderson, M.S. (1995). The War of Austrian Succession 1740–1748. Routledge. ISBN 978-0-582-05950-4.
- Atkinson, C.T. (1944). "The Peninsula Second Front in the War of the Spanish Succession". Journal of the Society for Army Historical Research. JSTOR 44228346.
- Bromley, J.S. (1979) [1970]. The New Cambridge Modern History. Vol. 6, The Rise of Great Britain and Russia. Cambridge University Press. ISBN 978-0-521-29396-9.
- Bruijn, J. R. (2011). The Dutch Navy of the Seventeenth and Eighteenth Centuries. Oxford University Press. ISBN 9780986497353.
- Burke, Kathleen. "At War with the French: Louis XIV and Napoleon". Gresham College.
- Carlos, Ann; Neal, Larry; Wandschneider, Kirsten (2006). "The Origins of National Debt: The Financing and Re-financing of the War of the Spanish Succession". International Economic History Association.
- Carlton, Charles (2013). This Seat of Mars: War and the British Isles, 1485–1746. Yale University Press. ISBN 978-0300197143.
- Childs, John (2013) [1991]. The Nine Years' War and the British Army, 1688–1697: The Operations in the Low Countries. Manchester University Press. ISBN 978-0-7190-8996-1.
- Clodfelter, M. (2008). Warfare and Armed Conflicts: A Statistical Encyclopedia of Casualty and Other Figures, 1492–2015 (3rd ed.). McFarland. ISBN 978-0-7864-7470-7.
- Colville, Alfred (1935). Studies in Anglo-French History During the Eighteenth, Nineteenth and Twentieth Centuries. Forgotten Books. ISBN 978-1-5280-2239-2.
- Cowans, Jon (2003). Modern Spain: A Documentary History. University of Pennsylvania Press. ISBN 978-0-8122-1846-6.
- Craig, Gordon A. (1964). The Politics of the Prussian Army: 1640–1945. Oxford University Press. ISBN 978-0-19-500257-7.
- de Vries, Jan (2009). "The Economic Crisis of the 17th Century". Journal of Interdisciplinary Studies. 40 (2).
- Dee, Darryl (2024). 1709: The Twilight of the Sun King. Rowman & Littlefield. ISBN 978-1-5381-7667-2.
- Dhondt, Frederik (2015). De Ruysscher, D.; Capelle, K. (eds.). History in Legal Doctrine; Vattel and Réal De Curban on the Spanish Succession; the War of the Spanish Succession in Legal history; moving in new directions. Maklu. ISBN 978-90-466-0758-9.
- Dunham, A (1832). A History of Spain and Portugal. Vol. 5.
- Dwyer, Philip G. (2014). The Rise of Prussia 1700–1830. Taylor & Francis. ISBN 978-0-582-29268-0.
- Elliott, John (2014). Dadson, Trevor (ed.). The Road to Utrecht in Britain, Spain and the Treaty of Utrecht 1713–2013. Routledge. ISBN 978-1-909662-22-3.
- Falkner, James (2015). The War of the Spanish Succession 1701–1714. Pen & Sword. ISBN 978-1-78159-031-7.
- Fernández-Xesta y Vázquez, Ernesto (2012). "La Heráldica Familiar" (PDF). Emblemata (in Spanish). 18: 243–257.
- Francis, David (May 1965). "Portugal and the Grand Alliance". Historical Research. 38 (97): 71–93. doi:10.1111/j.1468-2281.1965.tb01638.x.
- Frey, Linda; Frey, Marsha, eds. (1995). The Treaties of the War of the Spanish Succession: An Historical and Critical Dictionary. Greenwood. ISBN 978-0-313-27884-6.
- Glete, Jan (2001). War and the State in Early Modern Europe; Spain, the Dutch Republic and Sweden as Fiscal-Military States, 1500–1660. Routledge. ISBN 978-0-415-22645-5.
- Gregg, Edward (2001) [1980]. Queen Anne. The English Monarchs Series (revised ed.). Yale University Press. ISBN 978-0-300-09024-6.
- Hattendorf, John (1978). England in the war of the Spanish succession. Naval War College, Center for Advanced Research.
- Hattendorf, John (1979). A Study in the English View and Conduct of Grand Strategy, 1701–1713 (PhD thesis). Pembroke College Oxford. Archived from the original on 19 May 2022.
- Hochedlinger, Michael (2003). Austria's Wars of Emergence, 1683–1797. Routledge. ISBN 0-582-29084-8.
- Holmes, Richard (2008). Marlborough: England's Fragile Genius. Harper. ISBN 978-0-00-722572-9.
- Ingrao, Charles (1979). In Quest & Crisis; Emperor Joseph I and the Habsburg Monarchy (2010 ed.). Cambridge University Press. ISBN 978-0-521-78505-1.
- Ingrao, Charles (2010) [2000]. The Habsburg Monarchy, 1618–1815. Cambridge University Press. ISBN 978-0-521-78505-1.
- Israel, Jonathan (1990) [1989]. Dutch Primacy in World Trade, 1585–1740. Oxford University Press. ISBN 978-0-19-821139-6.
- Kamen, Henry (2001). Philip V of Spain: The King Who Reigned Twice. Yale University Press. ISBN 978-0-253-19025-3.
- Kamen, Henry (2002). Spain's Road to Empire: The Making of a World Power, 1492–1763. Allen Lane. ISBN 978-0-7139-9365-3.
- Kamen, Henry (1969). The War of Succession in Spain 1700–15. Indiana University Press. ISBN 978-0-300-18054-1.
- Kann, Robert (1974). A History of the Habsburg Empire, 1526–1918 (1980 ed.). University of California Press. ISBN 978-0-520-04206-3.
- Kubben, Raymond (2011). Regeneration and Hegemony: Franco-Batavian Relations in the Revolutionary Era 1795–1803. Martinus Nijhoff. ISBN 978-90-04-18558-6.
- Lesaffer, Randall (10 November 2014). "The peace of Utrecht and the balance of power". Blog.OUP.com.
- Lesaffer, Randall. "Fortress Belgium – The 1715 Barrier Treaty". OUP Law.
- Levy, Jack (2014). War in the Modern Great Power System: 1495 to 1975. University of Kentucky. ISBN 978-0-8131-6365-9.
- Lindsay, J.O. (1957). The New Cambridge Modern History. Vol. 7: The Old Regime, 1713–1763. Cambridge University Press. ISBN 978-0-521-04545-2.
- Lynn, John (1999). The Wars of Louis XIV, 1667–1714. Modern Wars in Perspective. Longman. ISBN 978-0-582-05629-9.
- Lynn, John A. (1994). "Recalculating French Army Growth during the Grand Siècle, 1610–1715". French Historical Studies. 18 (4): 881–906. doi:10.2307/286722. JSTOR 286722.
- Mahon, Lord (1832). History of the War of Succession in Spain. London: John Murray.
- Marques, A. H. de Oliveira (1983). História de Portugal (in Portuguese). Palas Editores.
- McKay, Derek; Scott, H.M. (1983). The Rise of the Great Powers 1648–1815. The Modern European State System. Routledge. ISBN 978-0-582-48554-9.
- Meerts, Paul Willem (2014). Diplomatic negotiation: Essence and Evolution (PhD thesis). Leiden University. hdl:1887/29596.
- Myers (1917). "Violation of Treaties: Bad Faith, Nonexecution and Disregard". The American Journal of International Law. 11 (4): 794–819. doi:10.2307/2188206. JSTOR 2188206. S2CID 147292326.
- Navarro i Soriano, Ferran (2019). Harca, harca, harca! Músiques per a la recreació històrica de la Guerra de Successió (1794–1715). Editorial DENES. ISBN 978-84-16473-45-8
- Nicholson, G.W.L. (1955). Marlborough and the War of the Spanish Succession. Queen's Printer.
- Nimwegen, Olaf van (2020). De Veertigjarige Oorlog 1672–1712: de strijd van de Nederlanders tegen de Zonnekoning [The Forty Years' War 1672–1712: the Dutch struggle against the Sun King] (in Dutch). Prometheus. ISBN 978-90-446-3871-4.
- Nimwegen, Olaf van (2002). De Republiek der Verenigde Nederlanden als grote mogendheid: Buitenlandse politiek en oorlogvoering in de eerste helft van de achttiende eeuw en in het bijzonder tijdens de Oostenrijkse Successieoorlog (1740–1748) (in Dutch). De Bataafsche Leeuw. ISBN 90-6707-540-X.
- Nimwegen, Olaf van (1995). De subsistentie van het leger: Logistiek en strategie van het Geallieerde en met name het Staatse leger tijdens de Spaanse Successieoorlog in de Nederlanden en het Heilige Roomse Rijk (1701–1712) [The subsistence of the Allied and especially the Dutch army during the War of the Spanish Succession] (Thesis) (in Dutch). Universiteit Utrecht.
- Onnekink, David; Bruin, Reger de (2013). De Vrede van Utrecht (1713) [The Peace of Utrecht (1713)] (in Dutch). Verloren. ISBN 978-90-8704-312-4.
- Ostwald, Jamel (2000). "The 'Decisive' Battle of Ramillies, 1706: Prerequisites for Decisiveness in Early Modern Warfare". History. 42 (3): 649–677. doi:10.2307/120864. JSTOR 120864.
- Ostwald, Jamel (2006). Vauban under Siege: Engineering Efficiency and Martial Vigor in the War of the Spanish Succession. Brill. ISBN 978-90-47-41150-5.
- Ostwald, Jamel (2014). Murray, Williamson; Sinnreich, Richard (eds.). Creating the British way of war: English strategy in the War of the Spanish Succession in Successful Strategies: Triumphing in War and Peace from Antiquity to the Present. Cambridge University Press. ISBN 978-1-107-63359-9.
- Pincus, Steven (2012). "Rethinking Mercantilism: Political Economy, The British Empire and the Atlantic World in the 17th and 18th Centuries". William and Mary Quarterly. 69 (1).
- Rasler, Karen (1994). The Great Powers and Global Struggle, 1490–1990. University Press of Kentucky. ISBN 978-0-8131-1889-5.
- Rothbard, Murray (23 April 2010). "Mercantilism as the Economic Side of Absolutism". Mises.org.
- Rowen, Herbert H. (1954). "John de Witt and the Triple Alliance". The Journal of Modern History. 26 (1): 1–14. doi:10.1086/237659. JSTOR 44224692. S2CID 145695238.
- Rowlands, Guy (2013). The financial decline of a great power war, influence, and money in Louis XIV's France. Oxford University Press. ISBN 9780191744600.
- Rule, John (2017). The Partition Treaties, 1698–1700 in A European View in Redefining William III: The Impact of the King-Stadholder in International Context. Routledge. ISBN 978-1-138-25796-2.
- Schaeper, Thomas (March 1986). "French and English Trade after Utrecht". Journal for Eighteenth Century Studies. 9 (1). doi:10.1111/j.1754-0208.1986.tb00117.x.
- Schmidt Voges, Inken; Solana Crespo, Ana, eds. (2017). Introduction to New Worlds?: Transformations in the Culture of International Relations Around the Peace of Utrecht in Politics and Culture in Europe, 1650–1750. Routledge. ISBN 978-1-4724-6390-6.
- Shinsuke, Satsuma (2013). Britain and Colonial Maritime War in the Early Eighteenth Century. Boydell Press. ISBN 978-1-84383-862-3.
- Simms, Brendan (2008). Three Victories and a Defeat: The Rise and Fall of the First British Empire, 1714–1783. Penguin. ISBN 978-0-14-028984-8.
- Somerset, Anne (2012). Queen Anne: the Politics of Passion. Harper. ISBN 978-0-00-720376-5.
- Storrs, Christopher (2000). War, Diplomacy and the Rise of Savoy, 1690–1720. Cambridge: Cambridge University Press. ISBN 9780511496950.
- Storrs, Christopher (2006). The Resilience of the Spanish Monarchy 1665–1700. Oxford: Oxford University Press. ISBN 978-0-19-924637-3.
- Sundstrom, Roy A. (1992). Sidney Godolphin: Servant of the State. EDS. ISBN 978-0-87413-438-4.
- Symcox, Geoffrey (1985). Victor Amadeus: Absolutism in the Savoyard State, 1675–1730. University of California Press. ISBN 978-0-520-04974-1.
- Szechi, Daniel (1994). The Jacobites: Britain and Europe, 1688–1788. Manchester University Press. ISBN 978-0-7190-3774-0.
- Thompson, Andrew (2014). Dadson, Trevor (ed.). The Utrecht Settlement and its Aftermath in Britain, Spain and the Treaty of Utrecht 1713–2013. Routledge. ISBN 978-1-909662-22-3.
- Thompson, R.T. (1973). Lothar Franz von Schönborn and the Diplomacy of the Electorate of Mainz. Springer. ISBN 978-90-247-1346-2.
- Urlanis, Boris Cezarevič (1971). Wars and Population. Progress Publishing.
- Vault, François Eugène de (2016) [1845]. Pelet, Jean Jacques Germain baron (ed.). Mémoires militaires relatifs à la succession d'Espagne sous Louis XIV: Extraits de la correspondance de la cour et des généraux (in French). Vol. 1. Wentworth Press. ISBN 978-1-372-87768-1.
- Veenendaal, A. J. (1950). "The Opening Phase of Marlborough's Campaign of 1708 in the Netherlands: A Version from Dutch Sources". History. 35 (123/124): 34–48. doi:10.2307/120864. JSTOR 24402730.
- Veendendaal, A.J. (1970). Bromley, J.S. (ed.). The New Cambridge Modern History: Volume 6, The war of the Spanish succession in Europe. Cambridge University Press. ISBN 978-0-521-29396-9.
- Vives, Jaime (1969). An Economic History of Spain. Princeton University Press. ISBN 978-0-691-05165-9.
- Ward, William; Leathes, Stanley (2010) [1912]. The Cambridge Modern History. Nabu. ISBN 978-1-174-38205-5.
- White, Ian (2011). "Rural Settlement 1500–1770". The Oxford Companion to Scottish History. Oxford University Press. ISBN 978-0-19-211696-3.
- Wilson, Peter (2016). The Holy Roman Empire: A Thousand Years of Europe's History. Allen Lane. ISBN 978-1-84614-318-2.
- Wilson, Peter (2016). Heart of Europe: A History of the Holy Roman Empire. Allen Lane. ISBN 978-1846143182.
- Wolf, John (1974) [1968]. Louis XIV. W. W. Norton & Co. ISBN 978-0-393-00753-4.
- Wijn, J.W. (1956). Het Staatsche Leger: Deel VIII – Het tijdperk van de Spaanse Successieoorlog 1702–1705 (The Dutch States Army: Part VIII – The era of the War of the Spanish Succession 1702–1705) (in Dutch). Martinus Nijhoff.
- Wijn, J.W. (1964). Het Staatsche Leger: Deel VIII Het tijdperk van de Spaanse Successieoorlog 1711–1715 (The Dutch States Army: Part VIII – The era of the War of the Spanish Succession 1711–1715) (in Dutch). Martinus Nijhoff.
