= Francisco Castillo Fajardo, 2nd Marquis of Villadarias =

Spanish army officer

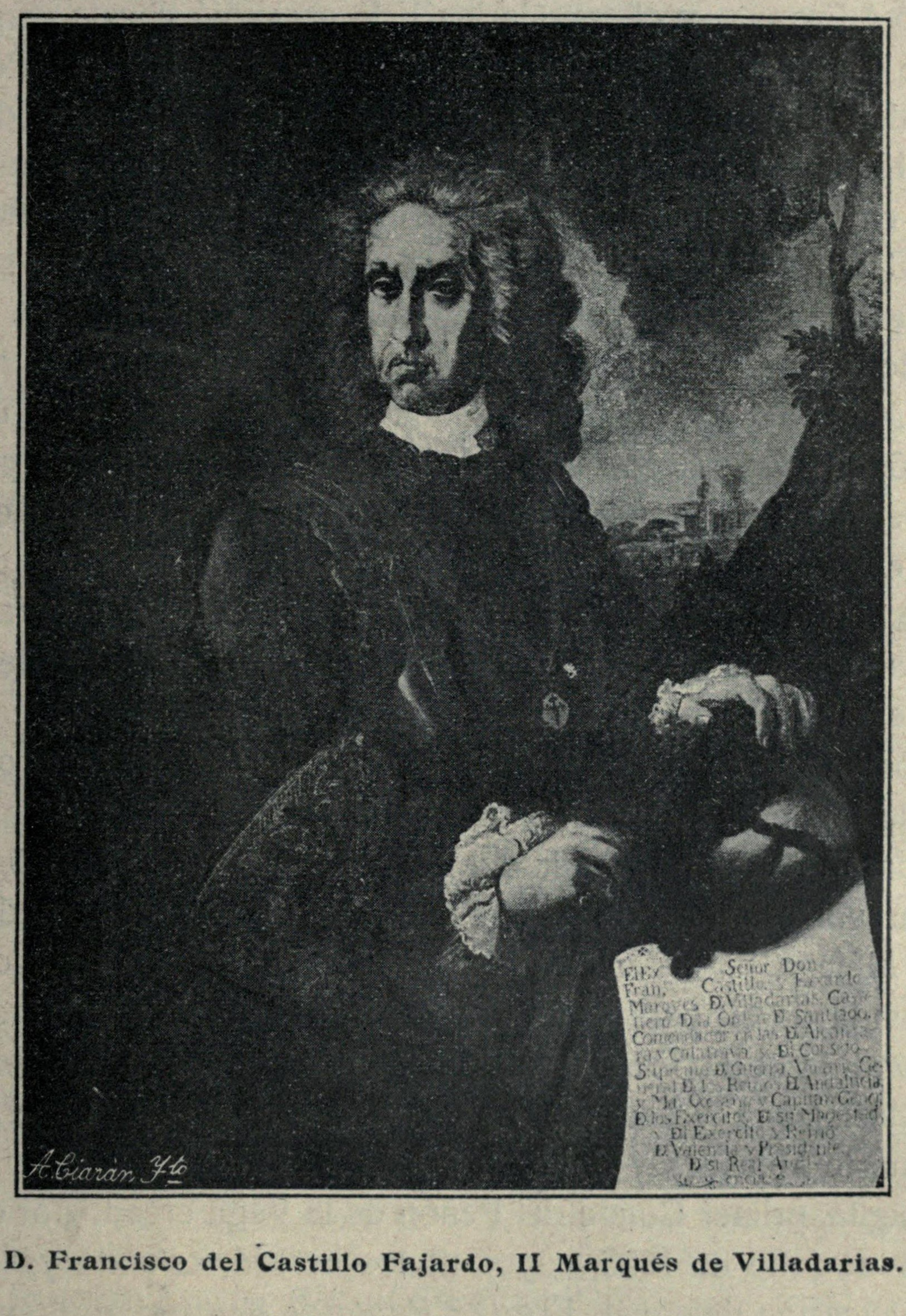
Portrait of Villadarias

Francisco Castillo y Fajardo, 2nd Marquis of Villadarias (December 1642 – April 1716) was a Spanish army officer who served during the Nine Years' War and the War of the Spanish Succession.

He rose to become Captain General of Andalusia and is remembered chiefly for his defence of Cádiz against the Anglo-Dutch fleet in 1702 and his controversial role in the siege of Gibraltar in 1704–1705.

== Origins and early life ==
Francisco del Castillo Fajardo was born in Málaga and baptised on 7 December 1642 in the parish church of Los Santos Mártires. He was the illegitimate son of Antonio Arias del Castillo (later 1st Marquis of Villadarias) and María Muñoz de Lorca, a noblewoman who was born in the village of Villar del Olmo near Alcalá de Henares in 1619. Antonio had promised María marriage but instead wed Dª Catalina Clara de los Ríos y Argote by proxy in Córdoba in October 1643. Although born outside wedlock, Francisco was recognised by his father as his sole heir and successor to the family mayorazgo, given that Antonio had no legitimate children.

The Castillo family had deep roots in the Málaga nobility. The line descended through Arias del Castillo, secretary of Charles V, Holy Roman Emperor, who had founded the family mayorazgo and held positions as Veedor General in Sicily. Through his paternal grandmother, Dª María Fajardo Maldonado, Francisco was also connected to the Berlanga and Maldonado families, among the founders of Málaga after the Reconquista.

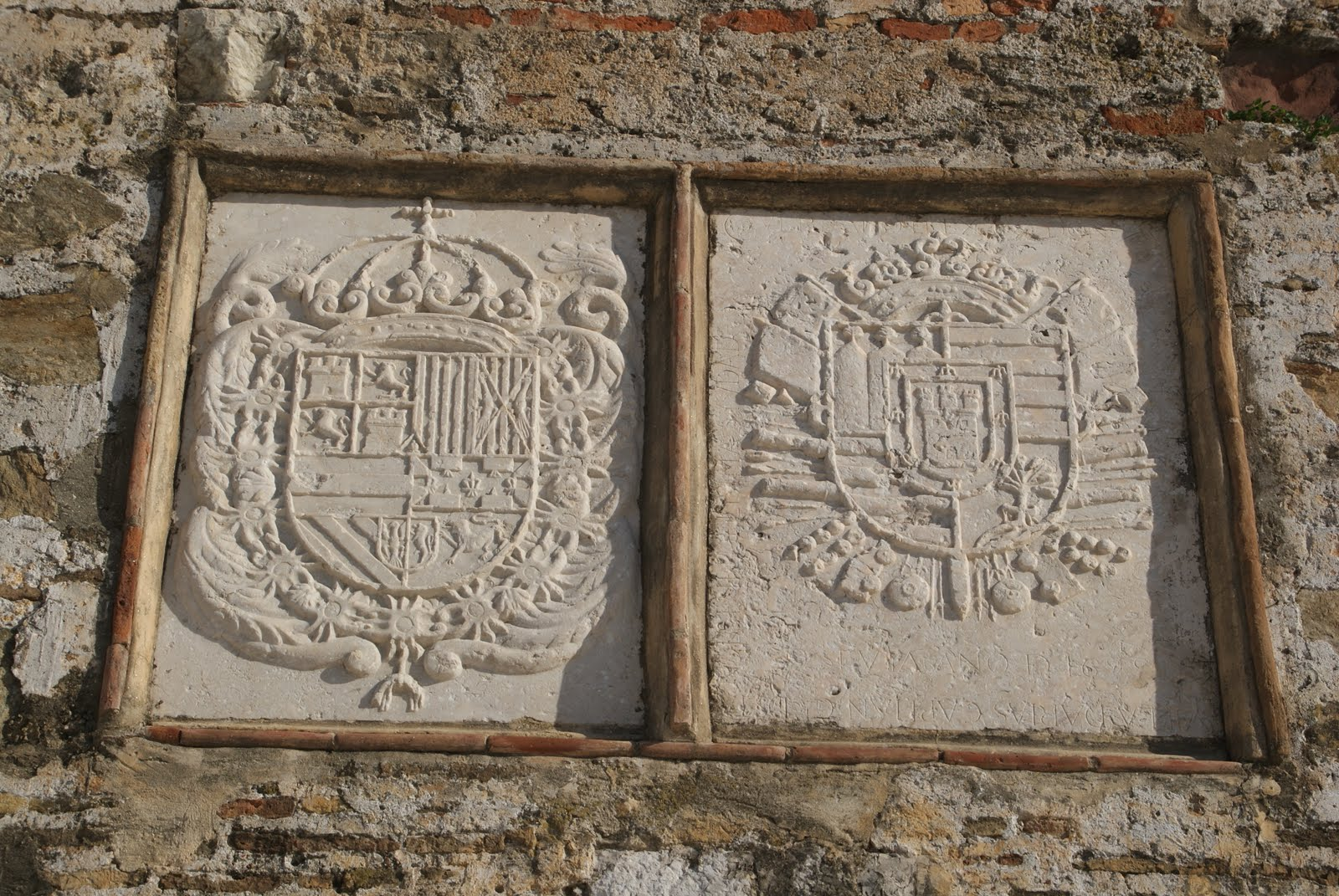
Coat of arms of Charles II of Spain (left) and Villadarias (right) over a gate in the Royal Walls of Ceuta. It was installed in 1699, when Villadarias was the governor of Ceuta.

Antonio Arias del Castillo was granted the title of Marquis of Villadarias (Villa de Arias) by Royal Dispatch of 20 March 1690, in recognition of Francisco's military services in the Low Countries; the title was given in the father's name as a formality, with the understanding it would pass to Francisco. After a protracted dispute with the royal treasury over the payment of lanzas (the fee owed for the title), a royal resolution of 26 April 1698 formally confirmed the marquisate in Francisco's person, with letters patent issued on 7 September 1699.

Francisco's father died on 13 November 1692 in Málaga. His mother, María Muñoz, eventually died in 1702.

Francisco spent his first years in his father's household, later raised by his paternal grandmother. At around the age of sixteen, a great-uncle, Fray Antonio del Castillo — Comisario General of Jerusalem and of the Franciscan Order — brought him to Madrid and launched his military career. This clergyman also obtained for him a grant of the habit of the Order of Santiago, which Francisco received after presenting a successful genealogical inquiry before the Council of that Order in December 1684.

He married Dª Paula María de Vintimilla Rodríguez de Santisteban on 25 March 1685. Through her he gained connections to the princely Vintimilla lineage, the Marquises of Crópani and the Counts of the Peñón de la Vega. The couple had several children, including sons Francisco and Juan, and daughters born in Ceuta and elsewhere.

== Military career before the War of the Succession ==
In 1662, at about twenty years of age, Francisco was commissioned as an alférez (ensign) in the Armada del Mar Océano. He subsequently served as Alférez and Captain of Infantry in the Regimiento del Rey. In 1668 he went to Flanders, where he served in the naval forces. He was promoted to captain in 1673 and also served in cavalry as a Sargento Mayor. In 1681 he returned to Spain and raised a tercio of infantry in Andalusia that marched to Ostend in the summer of 1682, joining the tercio under the Marquis of Bedmar. He took command of that regiment on 24 September 1682 and held it until 1686.

During the French offensive of 1684 in Flanders he fought in several engagements, including at the bridge of Batenburg near Thionville and in the defence of Luxembourg in May–June 1684.

In 1690, at the outset of the Nine Years' War, King Charles II of Spain appointed him Governor of Ostend and then Captain General of the Artillery of the Army of Flanders, a post that had fallen vacant when the Marquis of Bedmar was promoted to Maestre de Campo General of that army. That same year he fought in the Battle of Fleurus (summer 1690), in which French forces inflicted a heavy defeat on the allied troops. He then commanded Spanish forces at the Battle of Steenkerque on 8 March 1692, again suffering defeat at French hands.

After returning briefly to Spain following his father's death in 1692, he fought at the Battle of Landen (Neerwinden) on 29 July 1693. Shortly afterwards he was ordered to defend the town of Charleroi after the French attacked it under Marshal Luxembourg. The thesis notes that although the defence ultimately failed, Villadarias's role in the episode was "very commendable."

At the end of 1694 he returned to Spain as Maestre de Campo General of the army of Catalonia under the Viceroy, the Duke of Escalona. During the summer of 1695 he was involved in the failed attempt to reconquer Palamós and was responsible for organising the retreat of the troops.

On 16 July 1696 he was promoted to Captain General of Guipúzcoa, where he remained until April 1698, when he was appointed to the equivalent post in Ceuta.

== Governor of Ceuta (1698–1702) ==
In July 1698 Villadarias arrived in Ceuta as its new governor, relieving D. Melchor de Avellaneda. The city had been besieged since October 1694 by the forces of the Moroccan sultan Moulay Ismail, and this siege would continue until 1724. When the blockade began, the city's garrison numbered between 600 and 1,000 infantry, fewer than 100 cavalry, some 60–80 artillerymen and about 60 marines — a force often supplemented by armed civilians and clergy.

During his governorship Villadarias undertook extensive military and civil improvements. He formed a company of miners (minadores), placing a captain, an alférez, a sergeant, four masters and twelve foremen at its head, supported by eighty miners. He directed the construction of a defensive underground line in front of the city's palisade, built the bastion of Santa Ana, and formed a hornabeque (a hornwork fortification). He also built the almacenes of San Pedro, four barrack vaults along the royal wall, the arches of the bridge of the Puerta de la Almina, and cleaned out the dock. He began the city's first royal hospital, since the many wounded had previously been tended in private homes and convents.

In July 1699 a major assault was launched. Villadarias had troops waiting at Gibraltar and personally coordinated the explosion of a large mine to destroy the besiegers' defences before landing his reinforcements. Although there was initial disorder and significant casualties when the Moroccan forces counter-attacked, the Spaniards maintained their position. The contemporary chronicler Alejandro Correa da Franca recorded that Villadarias showed exceptional personal bravery, drawing his sword to enter the fighting himself before his officers restrained him.

He also pursued diplomatic and administrative work: in November 1701 he secured from Philip V a royal decree reconfirming Ceuta's traditional privileges and administrative structures.

His coat of arms, dated 1699, can still be seen carved in stone in four places in Ceuta, including above the gate of the hornaboque of the Frente de la "Valenciana" and on the royal wall (Muralla Real).

At the end of December 1701 Villadarias received preliminary notification of his appointment as Captain General of the Ocean Sea and the Coast of Andalusia, initially on an interim basis from Ceuta. His appointment was published in the Gaceta de Madrid on 10 January 1702 and confirmed definitively from Barcelona three months later.

== Captain General of Andalusia and the War of the Succession ==
=== Defence of Cádiz (1702) ===
On taking up his post in the Puerto de Santa María in early 1702, Villadarias found the Andalusian coastal defences in a dire state. His infantry numbered barely 130 men and he had only thirty horses. In the summer of 1702 a combined Anglo-Dutch fleet of approximately fifty warships under Admiral George Rooke and the Dutch Admiral Allemand — carrying some fourteen thousand troops — approached the coast of Cádiz.

The fleet began landing forces at Rota on 22 August 1702. Villadarias, unable to mount an open-field defence, withdrew to a country estate between the Puerto de Santa María and Jerez, from where he monitored enemy movements and gradually assembled a force that eventually exceeded two thousand men. He adopted a strategy of feigning larger numbers, described by the Marquis de San Felipe: he raised dust-clouds by day and lit dispersed fires at night to simulate the camp of a large army, and sent cavalry detachments — mixing veteran and local troops — to the shoreline to harass the enemy.

When the Duke of Ormonde sent him a letter calling on him to support the Archduke Charles, Villadarias replied bluntly: Los españoles no mudamos de religión ni de rey ("Spaniards do not change either their religion or their king").

The allied forces occupied Puerto de Santa María on 2 September, after Villadarias had evacuated much of its population. However the excesses and pillaging carried out by the invaders turned local opinion firmly against the Austracist cause, and the strategic objective — persuading Andalusians to declare for the Archduke — was never achieved. The Anglo-Dutch forces abandoned Puerto de Santa María on 24 September, blew up the castle of Santa Catalina, and re-embarked at Rota by the end of the month.

=== Operations on the Portuguese frontier (1703–1704) ===
After Portugal signed the Methuen Treaty in May 1703 and joined the Grand Alliance, Villadarias's Andalusian army became responsible for the frontier with Portugal. He faced chronic shortfalls of pay — eight tercios of infantry and three of Gibraltar's garrisons, plus four cavalry regiments, remained unpaid as late as November 1703 — and a tense relationship with the new Secretary of State for War, the Marquis of Canales, and his French adviser Jean Orry, who sought to centralise military control.

In December 1703 Villadarias marched his army by way of Seville into Extremadura to guard the frontier. In the spring of 1704 he led offensive operations in Portugal itself, taking the fortified places of Aldea Nueva and Aldea Azpea, then moving on to capture the town of San Alejo (demolishing its fortifications and seizing two artillery pieces), advancing toward Jerez de los Caballeros, and taking the town of Noudar, which he subsequently fortified. These operations were reported in the Gaceta de Madrid in June 1704. It was during these Portuguese operations that Gibraltar fell to the Anglo-Dutch fleet in August 1704, catching Villadarias away from the south coast.

=== The siege of Gibraltar (1704–1705) ===
Gibraltar was taken by an Anglo-Dutch assault force on 4–5 August 1704. According to the Gaceta de Madrid, Villadarias was already at the Campo de Gibraltar by 19 August; he met with the Comte de Toulouse at Málaga between 9 and 17 September 1704 to coordinate plans for recapturing the Rock, and had established his camp by mid-to-late September.

The siege formally began on 21 October 1704, when Villadarias's forces opened parallel trenches towards the Pastel fortification, advancing some 800 Castilian varas from a nearby windmill. Bombardment of the Rock followed on 26 October, and Villadarias was present at the artillery on that day, narrowly avoiding injury when a shell struck his horse. The four-day exchange of fire resulted in only twelve Spanish casualties.

Villadarias's ability to prosecute the siege was severely limited throughout by shortages of men, artillery transport, mortar ammunition, timber and camp equipment. He repeatedly petitioned the Marquis of Rivas, now in charge of the War Secretariat, for supplies, but received nothing, a fact suppressed in the official Gaceta de Madrid coverage.

On 26 January 1705 Philip V wrote to Villadarias informing him that Louis XIV had sent Marshal Tessé with 3,500 French troops to take command at Gibraltar, as the siege had become too important a matter to leave without French direction. Villadarias objected strongly, arguing that Spanish field marshals had never been subordinate to French marshals and that his honour would not allow him to serve under another officer. Despite requesting permission to retire to his house, he was ordered by Philip V to remain and submit to Tessé's authority, which he ultimately accepted.

An incident on 7 February 1705 illustrated the tensions between the two commands: French grenadier companies abandoned advantageous positions they had just seized, apparently because an emissary from Tessé — who was about to arrive — did not know of the operation and recalled them, exposing the Spanish troops and allowing the garrison to recover the high ground. Villadarias himself advanced sword in hand to try to salvage the situation, but the moment was lost. The document reporting this incident attributes blame to the Marquis of Tui, "not for lack of valour, but for wanting to wait for Tessé" to claim the credit for a successful assault.

Tessé arrived at Gibraltar in mid-February 1705. On 11 April 1705 the siege was abandoned. After Tessé and his men departed, Villadarias remained as Captain General of Andalusia, though without authority over the forces that had besieged Gibraltar, and continued to urge the recovery of the Rock, albeit with dwindling resources.

The thesis, drawing on nineteenth-century military historian José Gómez de Arteche and on the research of Manuel Álvarez Vázquez, argues that Villadarias has been made the "scapegoat" for the loss of Gibraltar by traditional Spanish historiography, and that the primary causes of failure were the inadequacy of resources, problems of inter-allied command, and the prior commitment of troops to the Portuguese frontier rather than any personal failing of the captain general.

=== Dismissal from Andalusia ===
On 13 November 1706 it was publicly announced that Villadarias was removed from the post of Captain General of Andalusia, to be replaced by the Duke of Osuna. The document of dismissal noted that he had served a normal term of approximately three years (from early 1702) and specified that his jurisdiction had extended from the Guadiana River on the Portuguese frontier to Gibraltar, with a monthly salary of 500 escudos of ten reales each.

Between 1707 and 1710 he held the rank of colonel of cavalry, having been relieved of the captaincy general.

== Battle of Almenar and later career ==
At the start of the 1710 campaign Villadarias was recalled to active command. Philip V assigned him charge of the Bourbon forces operating from Navarre to Valencia — eighty battalions of infantry and seventy-two cavalry squadrons — as part of the effort to recover Catalonia. The Bourbon army as a whole numbered 152 battalions and 123 squadrons.

In late July 1710 the Battle of Almenar resulted in a serious reverse for the Bourbon forces. During the defeat Villadarias advised Philip V to retreat toward Lérida and covered the king's withdrawal as best he could. Following the battle, in which he was considered one of those responsible for the defeat, he was replaced in command by the Marquis de Bay.

After returning to Antequera, Villadarias remained there for a period documented by abundant notarial records. In September 1713 he was appointed to succeed D'Asfeld as Captain General of Valencia, with the presidency of the Audiencia and the Real Acuerdo.

One of his last known written documents is a letter dated 1 October 1715, written from Valencia to the Cabildo Colegial of Antequera, in which he donated fifty fanegas of wheat to help fund the construction of a new sagrario (tabernacle) in the Collegiate Church of San Sebastián in that city.

== Death ==
He died in Madrid in April 1716. His body was eventually transferred thirty-one years after his death, at the request of his son Francisco, to the niches beneath the chapel of San Isidro in the Convent of the Santísima Trinidad in Antequera, where he was buried together with his wife Dª Paula, who survived him by twenty-four years, dying on 21 October 1740.
