= March to Madrid (1706) =

1706 military operation

- Part of War of the Spanish Succession
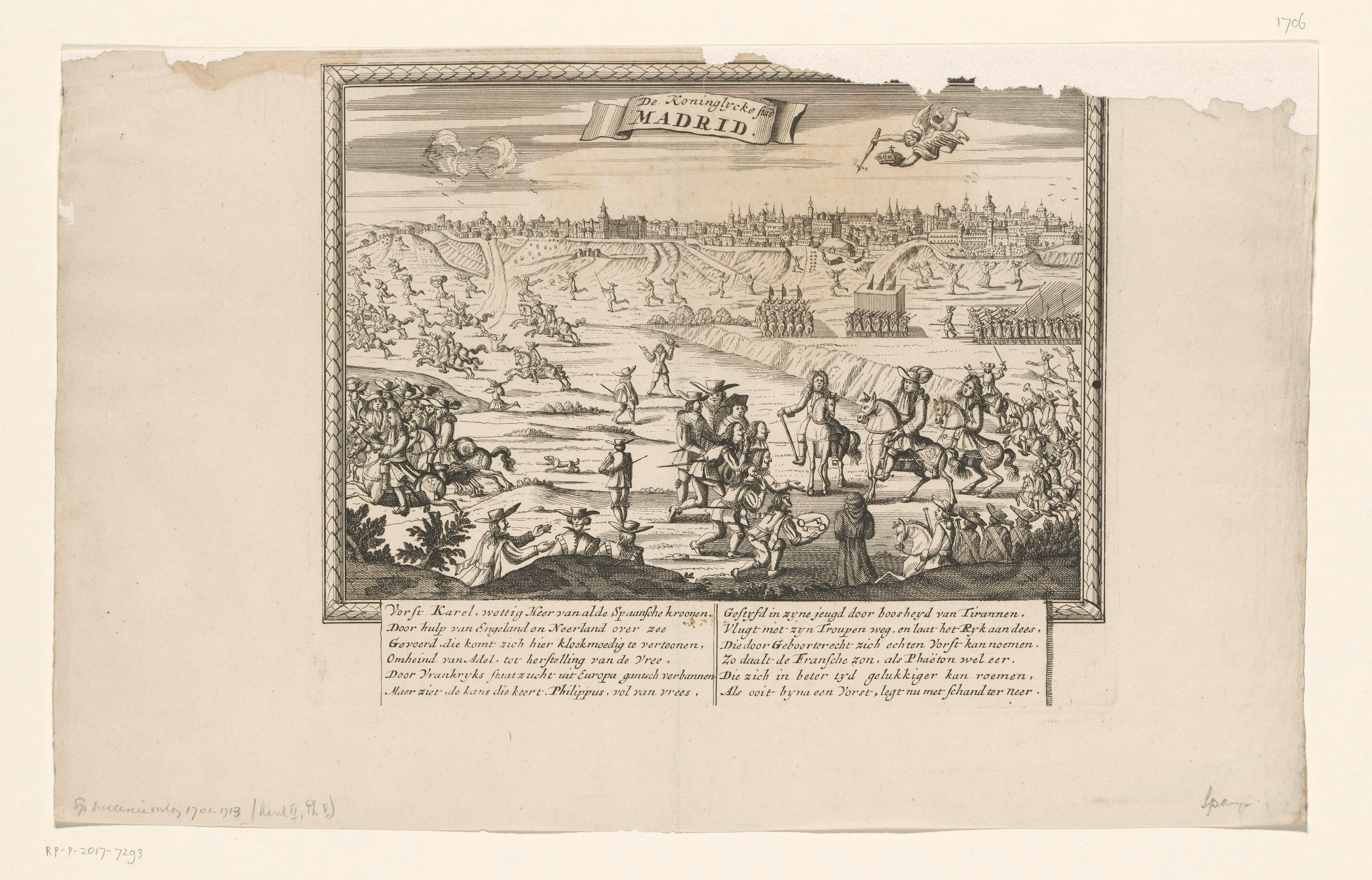
- Philip V, Duke of Anjou, flees from Madrid
Date	After 11 May (Note: The march to Madrid began shortly after the English retreat from Almaraz on 11 May.) – 28 June 1706
Location	Spain
Result	Grand Alliance victory
Territorial changes	Portuguese occupation of Madrid

Belligerents
Portugal; England; Dutch Republic	Bourbon Spain; France

Commanders and leaders
Marquis of Minas; Lord Galway	Philip V Duke of Berwick

Strength
14,700; 4,200	Unknown

Casualties and losses
Unknown	8,000 captured 100 artillery pieces seized

The March to Madrid (Note: Also known as the Campaign of Madrid or Conquest of Madrid.) was a military operation during the War of the Spanish Succession in 1706. Led by Lord Galway and Marquess of Minas, the Anglo-Dutch and Portuguese forces successfully occupied Madrid and captured 8,000 prisoners.

== Campaign ==
=== Background ===
Earlier around May, a failed plan to move toward Talavera de la Reina led to a fallback to Coria until 14 May. From there, Lord Galway and Marquess of Minas agreed to besiege Ciudad Rodrigo, which fell after a brief bombardment.

The Anglo-Portuguese army began its march toward Madrid shortly after 11 May 1706. On 27 May, Lord Galway learned of the French retreat from Barcelona. The Duke of Berwick knew that his limited forces could not resist the opposing force and advised Philip V not to return from Perpignan, suggesting instead that the king establish his court at Burgos. Philip disregarded this advice and returned to Madrid early in June. He found the treasury exhausted and was unable to raise sufficient funds, despite appeals from the Queen to the Ayuntamiento and the nobility.

By 21 June, the army reached Epinal, near the Puerto de Guadarrama. Berwick retreated once more, and on 23 June they crossed the mountains unopposed.

Philip V left Madrid on 22 June with 3,300 troops to join Berwick, later reinforced by 4,300 from Valencia. Although Berwick's force now matched Galway's in size (13,800 to 14,000), he again retreated to Alcalá de Henares.

The councils of state and public tribunals relocated to Burgos, followed by the Queen. Philip V remained briefly in Madrid before departing to join Berwick's forces at Sopetrán, on the Guadarrama ridge. Although a decree allowed non-officeholders to remain in the city, many nobles accompanied the king.

=== Arrival at Madrid ===
On 25 June 1706, the cavalry under the Marquis of Villaverde entered Madrid. Two days later, Lord Galway and Marquess of Minas made their formal entry, with 14,700 Portuguese and 4,200 Anglo-Dutch troops. Upon arrival, they faced no opposition from the Duke of Berwick, and so they captured 8,000 prisoners, seized 100 artillery pieces, proclaimed Charles in the streets and attempted to restore public tribunals.

On 2 July, after delays from officials loyal to Philip, Charles was officially proclaimed King. However, the Austrian Charles and his foreign troops were received very coldly by the Madrid population. The Castilians had a great aversion to a monarch supported by the Catalans and Valencians, and therefore remained loyal to Philip. In addition, many allied soldiers became ill. As a consequence, the Allies remained inactive for a month, which allowed Philip V to regroup. Lord Peterborough later described this pause as "a halt as fatal as Hannibal at Capua."

Madrid subsequently returned to Philip V's control on 5 August 1706. For three days, reprisals were carried out against Portuguese, Catalans and Castilians who had supported Charles.

== See also ==
- Portugal in the War of Spanish Succession

== Bibliography ==
- Stanhope, Henry P. (1832). History of the War of the Succession in Spain. Murray.
- Davis, John (1895). The History of the Second Queen's Royal Regiment. Vol. 2. R.Bentley & son.
- Parnell, Arthur (1905). The War of the Succession in Spain. G. Bell and sons.
