= Avelin =

- Commune
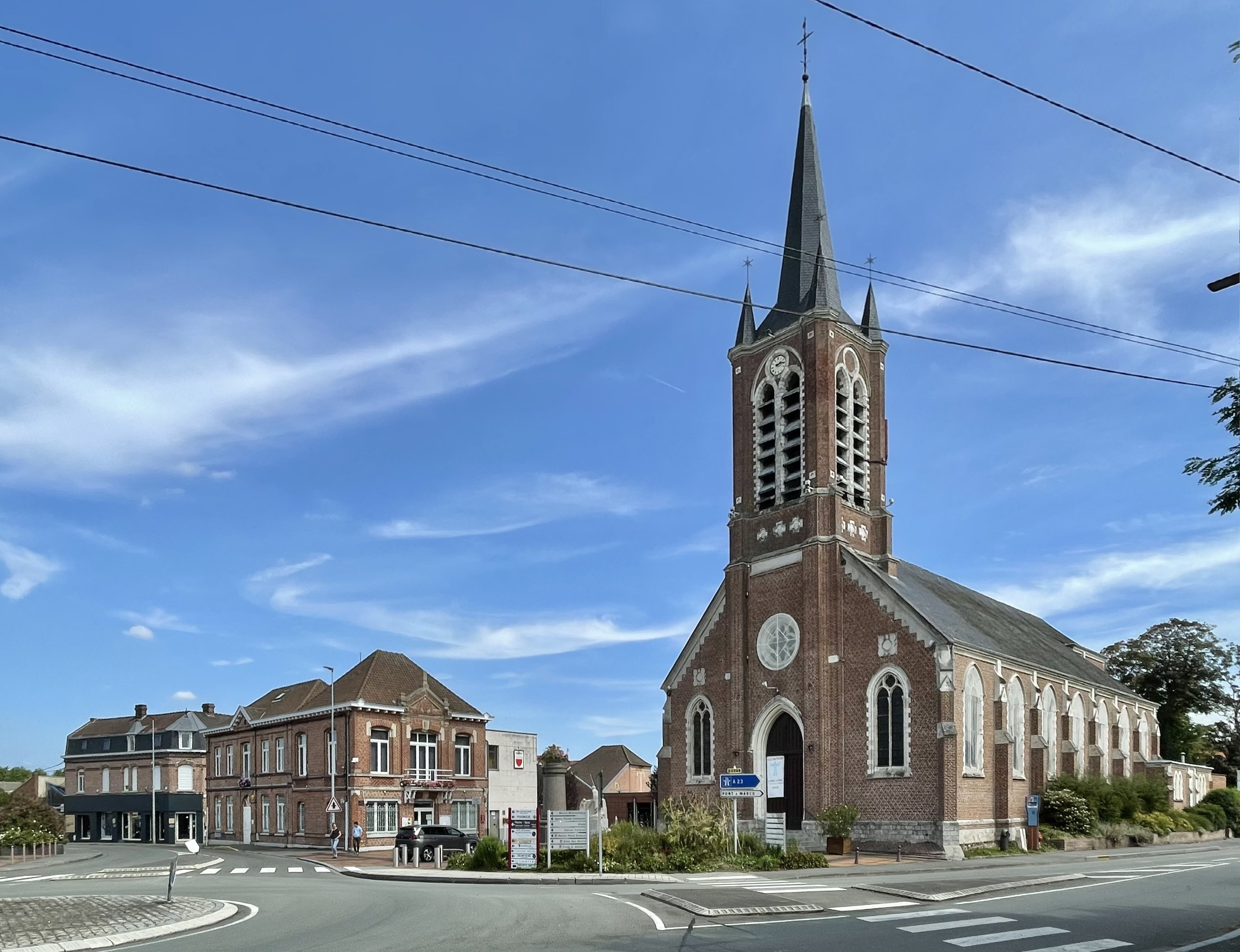
- Town centre with church

- Coat of arms
- Location of Avelin
- Location within France Location within Hauts-de-France
- Coordinates: 50°32′26″N 3°04′57″E
- Country: France
- Region: Hauts-de-France
- Department: Nord
- Arrondissement: Lille
- Canton: Templeuve-en-Pévèle
- Intercommunality: Pévèle-Carembault

Government
  - Mayor (2020–2026): José Roucou
- Area^{1}: 13.76 km^{2} (5.31 sq mi)
- Elevation: 47 m (154 ft)
- Highest elevation: 58 m (190 ft)
- Lowest elevation: 29 m (95 ft)
- Population (2023): 2,561
  - Density: 186.1/km^{2} (482.0/sq mi)
- Time zone: UTC+01:00 (CET)
  - Summer (DST): UTC+02:00 (CEST)
- INSEE/Postal code: 59034 /59710
- ^{1} French Land Register data, which excludes lakes, ponds, glaciers > 1 km^{2} (0.386 sq mi or 247 acres) and river estuaries.

Avelin (French pronunciation: [avlɛ̃]) is a commune in the Nord department in northern France. It is 10 km (6.2 mi) south of the centre of Lille.

The village's name is of Germanic origin.

== Population ==
Historical population

Year	Pop.	±% p.a.
1793	1,323	—
1821	1,599	+0.68%
1846	1,762	+0.39%
1872	1,687	−0.17%
1901	1,511	−0.38%
1926	1,366	−0.40%
1946	1,348	−0.07%
1962	1,391	+0.20%
1968	1,306	−1.05%

Year	Pop.	±% p.a.
1975	1,292	−0.15%
1982	1,817	+4.99%
1990	2,317	+3.09%
1999	2,304	−0.06%
2007	2,475	+0.90%
2012	2,590	+0.91%
2017	2,690	+0.76%
2023	2,561	−0.82%

Source: EHESS and INSEE (1968-2023)

== Heraldry ==
Arms of Avelin	The arms of Avelin are blazoned : Gules, a chief ermine.

== See also ==
- Communes of the Nord department
