= Charles Wills =

British army officer and politician

General The Right Honourable Sir Charles Wills KB
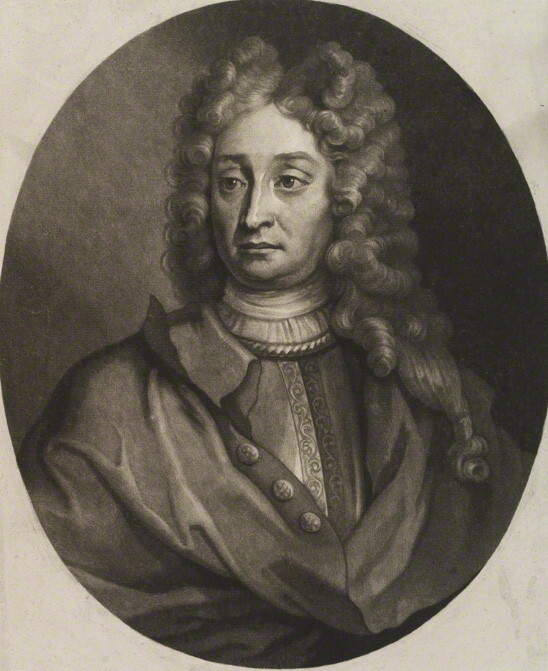

Member of Parliament for Totnes
- In office December 1718 – December 1741

Lieutenant-General of the Ordnance
- In office April 1718 – December 1741 †

Governor of Portsmouth
- In office 1718–1719

Governor of Berwick-upon-Tweed
- In office 1715–1718

Personal details
- Born: Charles Wills; 1666 St Goran, Cornwall
- Died: 25 December 1741 (aged 75) London
- Resting place: Westminster Abbey
- Party: Whig
- Occupation: Soldier and politician
- Awards: Privy Councillor 1719; Order of the Bath 1725

Military service
- Allegiance: England (1689–1707); Great Britain (1707–1741)
- Branch/service: English Army; British Army
- Years of service: 1689–1741
- Rank: General
- Unit: Colonel, 30th Foot 1705–1716; Buffs, 1716–1725; Grenadier Guards 1726–1741
- Battles/wars: Williamite War in Ireland; The Boyne; Aughrim; Nine Years' War; Landen Namur 1695; War of the Spanish Succession; Cádiz; Guadeloupe; Barcelona; Cagliari; Almenar; Saragossa; Brihuega; Jacobite rising of 1715; Preston

General Sir Charles Wills KB PC (October 1666 – 25 December 1741) was a British army officer and politician who served as Lieutenant-General of the Ordnance from 1718 to 1741. He also sat in the British House of Commons from 1718 to 1741, representing the constituency of Totnes.

He began his military career in 1689, serving successively in the Williamite War in Ireland, the Nine Years War and the War of the Spanish Succession. During the Jacobite rising of 1715, he commanded government troops at the Battle of Preston, which ended the rising in England.

Wills was rewarded with promotion to lieutenant-general and returned for Totnes, a seat controlled by the Duke of Bolton, a prominent Whig. Despite making little impact on Parliament, he was a reliable supporter of the government and appointed Privy Councillor in 1719.

George I made him one of the first members of the newly revived Order of the Bath in 1725, but Wills failed to gain a peerage as expected. He died in London on 25 December 1741 and was buried in Westminster Abbey.

== Personal details ==
Wills was baptised at St. Goran, Cornwall, on 23 October 1666, one of six surviving sons born to Anthony Wills of St Goran, and his wife Jenofer (died 1729). His brothers included Anthony (ca 1657–1690), John (1664–?), Richard (1665–ca 1719), Edward (died before 1728) and Symon (1668–?). Charles was by the far the most successful, although Richard retired in 1712 as a colonel, Edward as a captain, while several nephews also served under him.

Wills never married and died in London on 25 December 1741. With the exception of a few bequests, the bulk of his considerable estate was left to his executor Sir Robert Rich, which was unsuccessfully challenged in court by his nephew Richard.

== Career; 1689 to 1714 ==
Little is known of Wills' career prior to the 1688 Glorious Revolution, when he received a commission in the expanded army raised by William III. He and his brother Richard were appointed to a regiment raised by Thomas Erle, which took part in the 1689 to 1691 Williamite War in Ireland, fighting at The Boyne and Aughrim. In July 1691, the brothers switched to the 19th Foot, then also serving in Ireland, with Wills promoted to captain.

Transferred to Flanders in early 1692 during the Nine Years' War, his regiment fought in the battles of Steenkerque and Landen, as well as the Siege of Namur. In 1694, he became a major in Colonel Saunderson's regiment, reaching the rank of lieutenant-colonel in 1697 shortly before the war ended with the Treaty of Ryswick and his unit disbanded.

With the outbreak of the War of the Spanish Succession in June 1701, Wills was appointed to the newly raised 36th Foot, sent to Spain in 1702 as part of an Anglo-Dutch-German force under the Duke of Ormonde. He took part in the capture of Port St Mary, before joining an expedition to the West Indies, led by Christopher Codrington. In March 1703, they landed on the French island of Guadeloupe, but suffered heavy losses from disease. After Codrington became ill in late April, Wills supervised the evacuation of the remaining troops in May, before returning to Ireland.

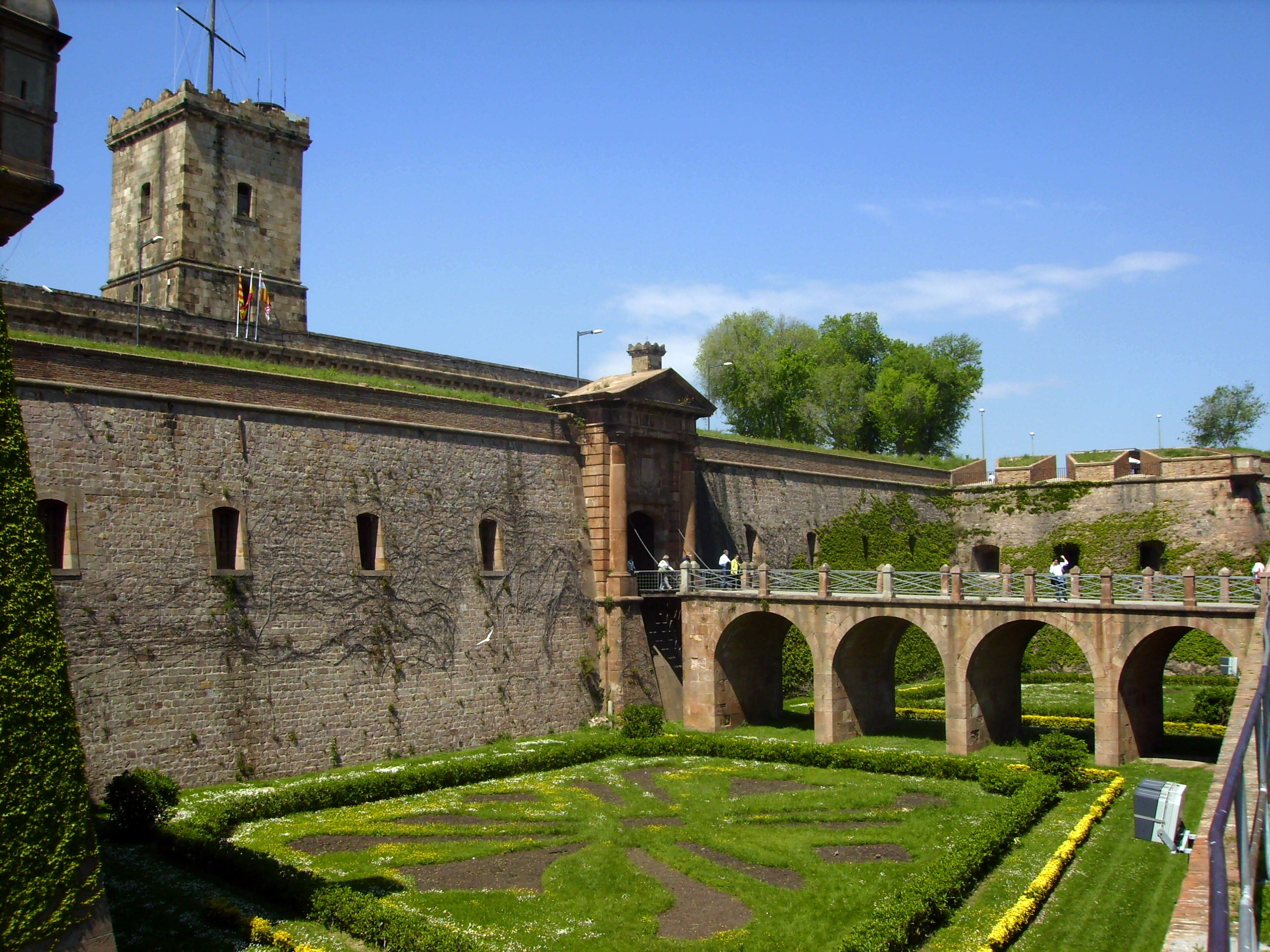
Montjuïc Castle, Barcelona; Wills participated in its capture in September 1705, then defended it in April 1706

In 1705, Wills accompanied the Earl of Peterborough to Spain as quartermaster-general, serving at the capture of Barcelona on 4 October 1705; nine days later, he was made colonel of a regiment of marines, later the 30th Foot. In January 1706, he participated in a brief but bloody encounter at San Esteban de Litera, taking command when Major-General Conyngham was mortally wounded. He was also part of the garrison during the unsuccessful Bourbon attempt to retake Barcelona in April 1706, and was promoted brigadier-general on 1 January 1707.

In March, Peterborough was recalled to England and replaced by the Earl of Galway, who suffered a serious defeat by Bourbon-Spanish forces at Almansa in April. Wills had been left in command of Allied forces in Catalonia and led the defence of Lleida, which surrendered on 11 November after a siege of two months. His stubborn resistance prevented the Bourbons from taking full advantage of their victory and attacking Barcelona. The garrison was given free passage to Allied-held territory, although Wills was briefly held in retaliation for the alleged detention of a Spanish officer.

The British government decided on a renewed offensive in 1708; when a Royal Navy squadron under John Leake attacked Sardinia in August, Wills commanded a landing force of 1,600 men which captured the capital Cagliari. Returning to Britain in October, he remained there until late 1709 when he was sent back to Spain, now as a major-general under James Stanhope. After victories at Almenar and Saragossa, the Allies entered Madrid, but could not hold the interior and were forced to retreat. Wills was among the 3,500 British troops forced to surrender at the Brihuega on 8 December.

The Battle of Villaviciosa on 10 December confirmed Bourbon control of Spain, while the 1710 British general election returned a Tory government that wanted peace. In the reduction of the army that followed, his brothers lost their commissions, while Stanhope's recommendation he be promoted to lieutenant-general failed to be approved. However, he was released after a few months, while his regiment avoided being disbanded like many others by being converted to an infantry unit and posted to Ireland in 1714.

== Career; 1715 and after ==
Under the 1701 Act of Settlement, Catholics were excluded from the British throne; this meant when Queen Anne died in August 1714, her successor was the distantly related but Protestant George I, rather than her Catholic half-brother James Francis Edward. The Tories lost office and pro-Hanoverian Whigs like Stanhope controlled government for the next 30 years. When the Jacobite rising of 1715 began in late August, Whig sympathisers were placed in key positions, with Wills given command of government troops in Chester. On 13 November, he attacked the rebels at Preston but was repulsed; next day, he was joined by forces under George Carpenter and with no possibility of escape, the Jacobites surrendered.

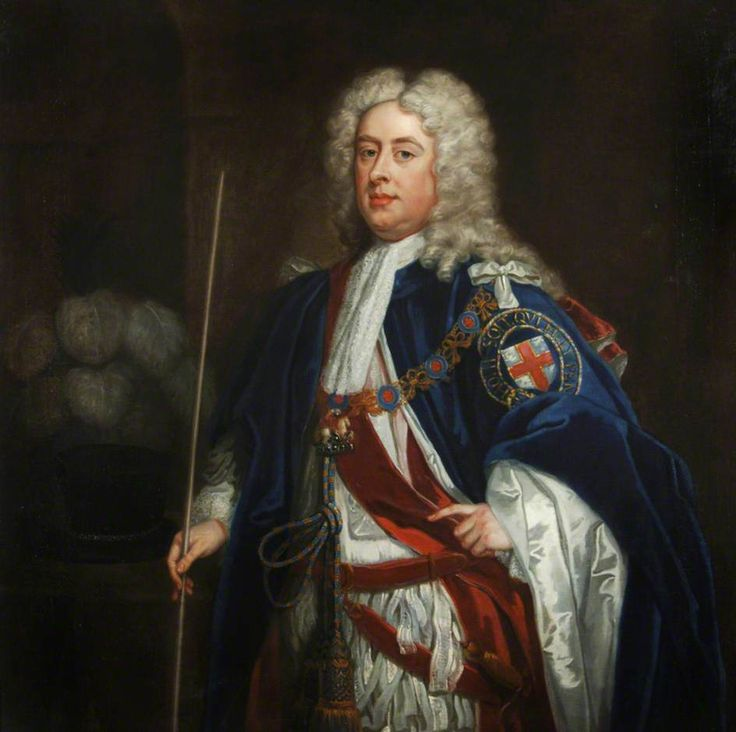
Whig politician, the Duke of Bolton, who nominated Wills for Totnes in 1718

Carpenter and Wills had allegedly clashed previously in Spain; despite being the senior officer, Carpenter felt Wills had taken most of the credit for this victory, while his role had been ignored. The two nearly came to blows, before the matter was smoothed over by Marlborough; Wills finally received his promotion to lieutenant-general, although Carpenter became Commander-in-chief, Scotland. In January 1716, Wills was appointed colonel of the 3rd Foot, served as Governor of Berwick-upon-Tweed from 1715 to 1718, then Portsmouth from 1718 to 1719, both considered important posts. On 22 April 1718, he was made Lieutenant-General of the Ordnance, a post he retained until his death in 1741.

At a by-election on 29 December 1718, Wills was returned as Member of Parliament for Totnes, a constituency controlled by the Whig Duke of Bolton. He held this seat continuously until his death, became a Privy Councillor on 9 May 1719 and voted reliably for the government, but otherwise made little impact on Parliament. One of the first members of the newly revived Order of the Bath in 1725, he was also appointed colonel of the Foot Guards in 1726; George I reportedly intended to make him a peer but this ended with his death in June 1727.

At a review of the Guards in July 1737, Wills rode off the field after George II allegedly called him a liar; although he became general of the infantry in 1739, this may have been why he did not reach the rank of Field Marshal as he expected. Wills died in London on 25 December 1741, and was buried in Westminster Abbey, although without a monument or gravestone. With the exception of a few legacies, he left the considerable sum of £5,000 to his aide-de-camp, Robert Rich, and the reminder to Robert's father and his executor, Sir Robert.

== Sources ==
- Anonymous (1887). Historical records of the XXX Regiment. London: William Clowes and Sons.
- Cannon, Richard (1848). Historical record of the Nineteenth or First Yorkshire North Riding Regiment of Foot containing an account of the formation of the regiment in 1688 and of its subsequent services to 1848. Parker, Furnivall and Parker.
- Dalton, Charles (1896). English army lists and commission registers, 1661–1714, Volume III. Eyre & Spottiswoode.
- Dalton, Charles (1904). English army lists and commission registers, 1661–1714, Volume V. Eyre & Spottiswoode.
- Dalton, Charles (1910). George the First's army 1714–1727, Volume I. Eyre & Spottiswoode.
- Handley, Stuart (2004). "Wills, Sir Charles (1666–1741)". Oxford Dictionary of National Biography (online ed.). Oxford University Press. doi:10.1093/ref:odnb/29604. (Subscription, Wikipedia Library access or UK public library membership required.)
- Kamen, Henry (2001). Philip V of Spain: The King Who Reigned Twice. Yale University Press. ISBN 978-0253190253.
- Lenman, Bruce (1980). The Jacobite Risings in Britain, 1689-1746. Methuen. ISBN 0413396509.
- Mathews, Shirley (1970). WILLS, Charles (1666-1741) in The History of Parliament: the House of Commons 1715-1754. Boydell & Brewer.
- Parnell, Arthur (1888). The War of the Succession in Spain: During the Reign of Queen Anne, 1702–1711. George Bell and Sons.
- Rubio Campillo, Xavier (2010). God save Catalonia! England's intervention in Catalonia during the War of the Spanish Succession (PDF). Grup de Recerca de la Universitat de Barcelona.
- "Sir Charles Wills". Westminster Abbey.
- Somerset, Anne (2012). Queen Anne: the Politics of Passion. Harper Press. ISBN 978-0007203765.

Parliament of Great Britain
Preceded by Stephen Northleigh; Sir John Germain	Member of Parliament for Totnes; 1718–1741; With: Stephen Northleigh 1718–1722; Joseph Banks 1722–1727; Exton Sayer 1727–1732; Sir Henry Gough 1732–1734; Sir Joseph Danvers 1734–1741	Succeeded by Sir Joseph Danvers; Sir John Strange
Military offices
Preceded by Thomas Pownall	Colonel of Regiment of Marines; 1706–1716	Succeeded by The Lord Forrester
Preceded by The Earl of Forfar	Colonel of Prince George of Denmark's Regiment; 1716–1726	Succeeded by The Lord Londonderry
Preceded by The Earl Cadogan	Colonel of the 1st Regiment of Foot Guards; 1726–1741	Succeeded by The Duke of Cumberland
