= No Peace Without Spain =

Early 18th-century British political slogan

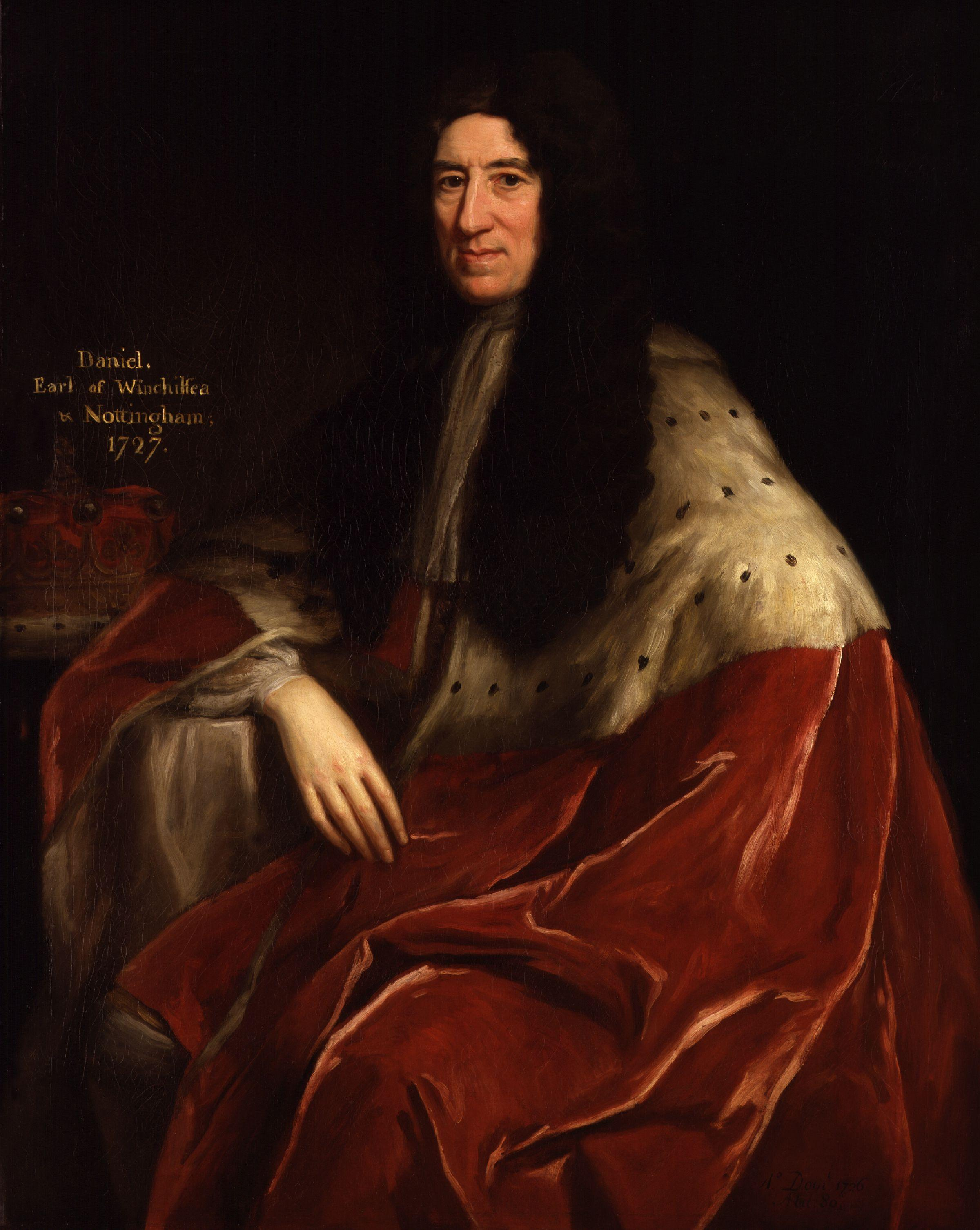
The Earl of Nottingham is credited with coining the slogan.

No Peace Without Spain was a popular British political slogan of the early eighteenth century. It referred to the ongoing War of the Spanish Succession (1701–1714) in which Britain was a leading participant. It implied that no peace treaty could be agreed with Britain's principal enemy Louis XIV of France that allowed Philip, the French candidate, to retain the Spanish crown. The term became a rallying cry for opposition to the Tory government of Robert Harley, Earl of Oxford, and the terms of the Treaty of Utrecht.

== Origin ==
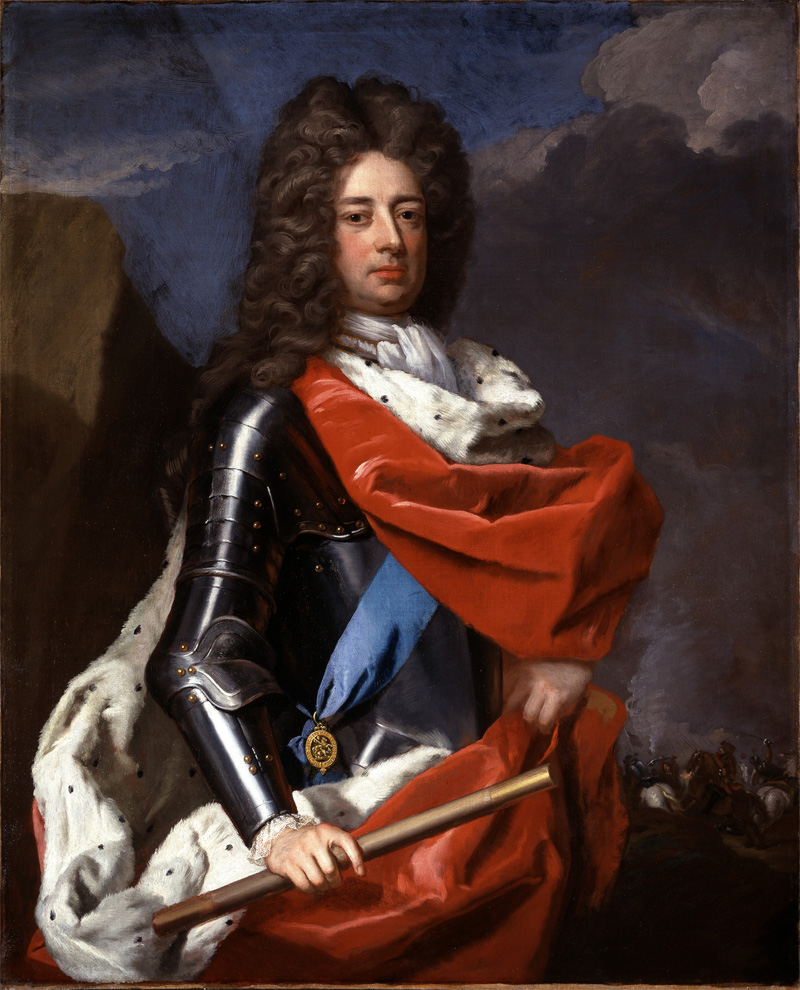
John Churchill, 1st Duke of Marlborough was closely associated with Britain's war effort until his dismissal in 1711. He then joined with Whig politicians to oppose the Peace of Utrecht.

The phrase was first popularly used by the Tory politician Lord Nottingham in Parliament in December 1711. However it was soon adopted by the rival Whig movement, who were increasingly regarded as the "war party" opposed to the "peace party" of the Tories. The Whigs were buoyed by the campaigns in the Low Countries where the British commander, the Duke of Marlborough, led the Allies to a series of victories. The Whigs demanded that King Louis be made to abandon his expansionist policies, and renounce any attempts to make Spain a satellite state.

While the term originated in London, it also spread to several Allied capitals as a statement of intent. However, this represented an extension of the war aims the Allies had originally agreed upon, potentially extending the conflict.

== Spanish War ==
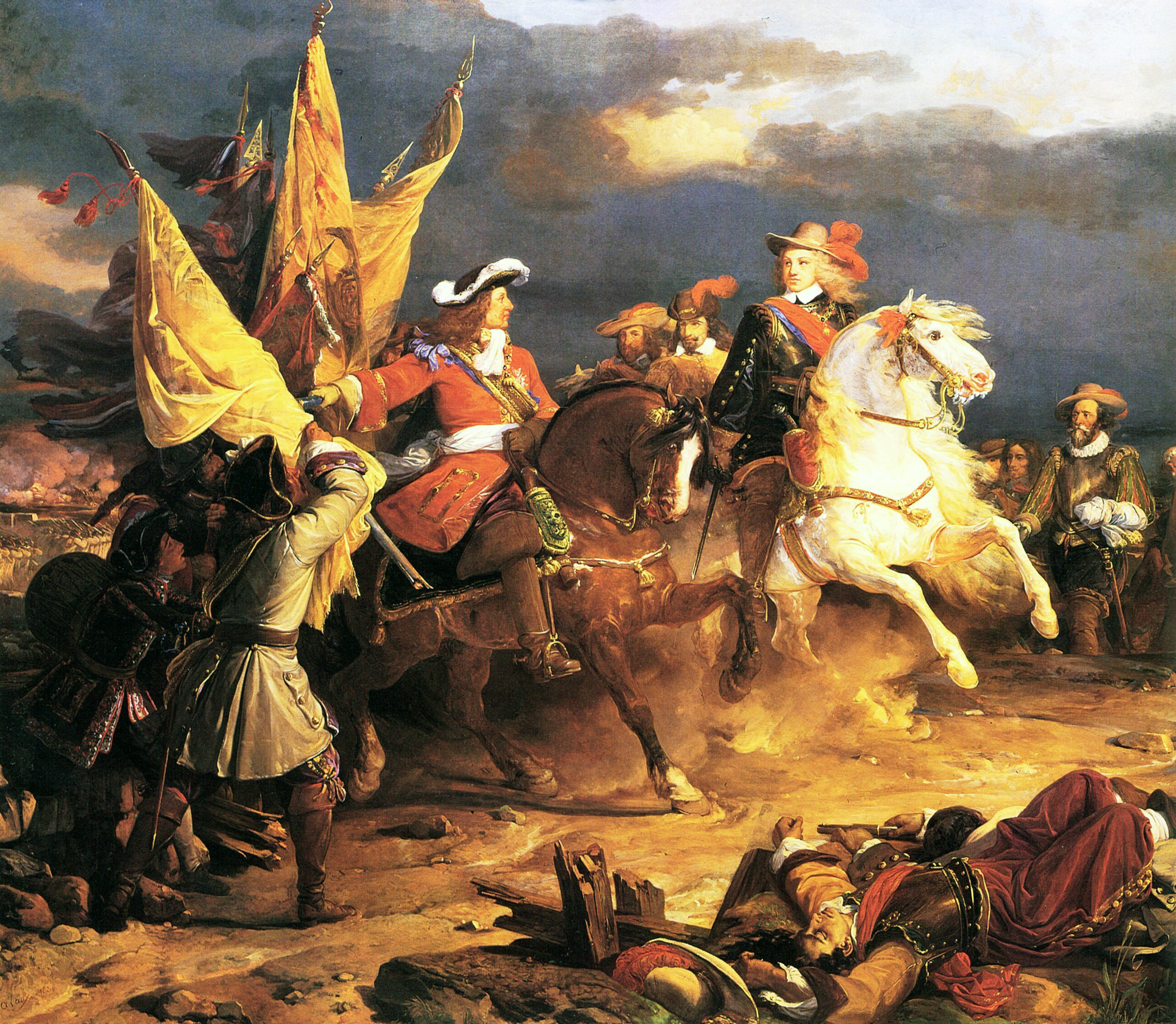
Victory at Villaviciosa in December 1710 settled the war in favour of Philip V.

The intervention in Spain started well for the pro-Habsburg side, with the capture of Gibraltar in 1704 and Barcelona in 1705 and securing the support of Portugal and Catalonia. However, it soon became clear the Bourbon candidate Philip V was far more popular in Castile than the Austrian Archduke Charles. The Allies were forced to evacuate Madrid in 1706 and soundly beaten at the Battle of Almansa in 1707.

In 1708 the new British commander James Stanhope took the island of Minorca, a possession of more use to the British than Charles' prospects of becoming King of Spain. Philip's forces recaptured Alicante in April 1709 and defeated an Anglo-Portuguese army at La Gudiña in May. The Portuguese now declared an informal truce, allowing trade and agriculture to recommence.

A renewed Allied effort in 1710 led to victories at Almenar and Saragossa in July and August and the capture of Madrid in September. However, lack of support from the local population meant Charles entered an almost deserted city and the Allies were effectively isolated when Portuguese forces were prevented from crossing into Spain. In November, they left Madrid for Catalonia in two separate detachments, Stanhope's division of 5,000 and one of 12,000 under the Austrian Starhemberg. At Brihuega on 9 December 1710, Stanhope was taken by surprise and forced to surrender to an army led by Louis Joseph, Duke of Vendôme. Vendôme followed this up the next day by defeating Starhemberg at Villaviciosa; these defeats were a devastating setback to Allied ambitions in Spain.

In April 1711, Emperor Joseph I died and his brother Archduke Charles succeeded him as the Holy Roman Emperor Charles VI; an Austrian union with Spain was as unwelcome to Britain as a French one, which meant to many strategists there seemed little point in continuing the war.

== Treaty of Utrecht ==
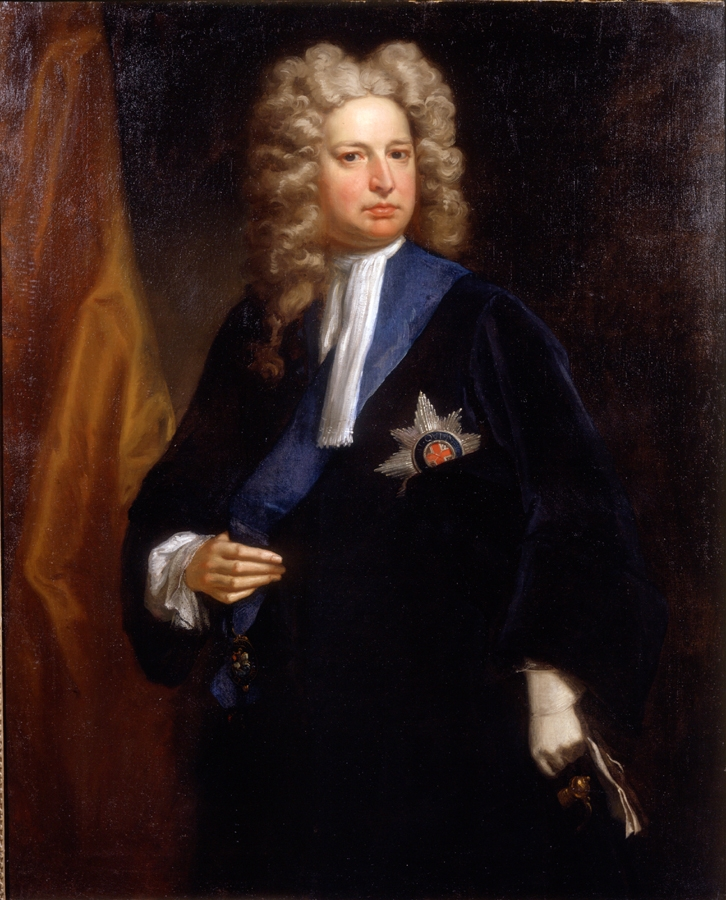
Robert Harley, the leader of the Tory government that negotiated the Treaty of Utrecht. His concessions over Spain were fiercely attacked by the opposition.

A new Tory government, led by Robert Harley, came to power in 1710. Committed to ending Britain's involvement in the European war, which had been costly in lives and money, it took steps to disengage, which eventually resulted in the dismissal of the hawkish Marlborough, who was replaced by the Irish Tory commander, the Duke of Ormonde.

An increasingly struggling France was eager to discuss terms. A major stumbling block had been an earlier demand for Louis XIV to assist, by force if necessary, in driving his own grandson from the throne of Spain. After lengthy negotiations an agreement was established, which included a compromise peace in Spain. That allowed Philip to keep the throne but granted to Britain the possession of Gibraltar and Minorca. Britain then withdrew from the war effort in both Flanders and Spain.

The terms of the Treaty of Utrecht were bitterly contested by the Whigs once they became clear. Jonathan Swift's The Conduct of the Allies was published as a defence of the Tory government. The celebrated Hamilton–Mohun duel was fought between Lord Mohun, a Whig partisan, and the Duke of Hamilton, who had just been appointed Ambassador to France. Tories portrayed the duel in which both men were killed, as a Whig plot to derail the peace agreement.

Whigs remained furious about what they regarded as the abandonment of Spain. The slogan became a popular rallying cry against the Treaty and the Tory government in general. In order to secure a majority in the Whig-dominated House of Lords, the government created twelve new Tory peers who were known as "Harley's Dozen". Nonetheless, Parliament voted for the Utrecht terms.

Still using the slogan of "No Peace Without Spain", Britain's former allies such as the Austria and the Dutch Republic tried to fight on but suffered defeats without the financial and military support that had been provided by London. The Allies reluctantly agreed terms with France. While they represented a successful outcome of the war, they were less than had been hoped for a few years before.

Philip was acknowledged as King of Spain but was forced to give up significant territories to the Emperor in Austria. The Allies then withdrew their last forces from the Iberian Peninsula. The final fighting in Spain took place when the remaining anti-French stronghold, Barcelona, fell after a lengthy siege.

== Aftermath ==
In 1714 George I the ruler of Hanover, one of the Allies who had opposed the withdrawal from Spain, succeeded to the British throne. George dismissed the Tories who had pushed through the compromise peace. He rewarded the opponents of Utrecht with places in government. These were mostly Whigs, although the new cabinet included the Tory Nottingham who had originally moved the "No Peace Without Spain" amendement. Marlborough was reinstalled as head of the Army with William Cadogan as his deputy. General Stanhope, a Whig, who had commanded in Spain and vigorously opposed the peace became chief minister and the architect of Britain's post-war foreign policy.

However, in an ironic turn of events, Britain soon agreed an Alliance with France. Before long the two countries were fighting together against a revived Spain under Philip, who was trying to overturn the Treaty of Utrecht and recover lost territories abroad. This war ended in defeat for Spain, although Philip kept his throne. Tories used this as evidence of the success of their policy. However, some younger Patriot Whigs such as William Pitt saw the compromise peace as leading to the later Franco-Spanish Alliance which caused Britain many problems throughout the 18th century.

Despite the prominence at the time of the "No Peace Without Spain" debate, the war in the Iberian Peninsula has largely been neglected by historians who have chosen to focus on Marlborough's Flanders campaigns.

== Bibliography ==
- Banks, Stephen. A Polite Exchange of Bullets: The Duel and the English Gentleman, 1750-1850. Boydell & Brewer, 2010.
- Falkner, James. The War of the Spanish Succession 1701-1714. Pen and Sword, 2015.
- Harding, Nick. Hanover and the British Empire, 1700-1837. Boydell & Brewer, 2007.
- Holmes, Geoffrey. British Politics in the Age of Anne. Bloomsbury Publishing, 1987.
- Holmes, Richard. Marlborough: England's Fragile Genius. Harper Press, 2008.
- Hugill, J. A. C. No Peace Without Spain. Kensal Press, 1991.
- Lyons, Adam. The 1711 Expedition to Quebec. Bloomsbury, 2014.
- Monod, Paul Kléber. Imperial Island: A History of Britain and Its Empire, 1660-1837. John Wiley & Sons, 2009.
- Pearce, Edward. Great Man: Sir Robert Walpole - Scoundrel, Genius and Britain's First Prime Minister. Random House, 2008.
