= William Seymour (British Army officer, born 1664) =

British soldier and politician

Lieutenant-General William Seymour
- Born: 8 February 1664
- Died: 9 or 10 February 1728 (aged 64)
- Relatives: Sir Edward Seymour, 4th Baronet (father)
- Military career
- Allegiance: Great Britain
- Branch: British Army
- Rank: Lieutenant-General

Lieutenant-General William Seymour (8 February 1664 – 9 or 10 February 1728) was a British soldier and politician. He was the second son of Sir Edward Seymour, 4th Baronet, the prominent Tory. He served successively as Member of Parliament for Cockermouth, Totnes and Newport, Isle of Wight.

On 3 October 1694, he took command as Colonel of the former Lord Cutts' Regiment of Foot. It was converted to a Marine regiment on 31 July 1698; he remained in command until it was disbanded on 20 May 1699. From 1 March 1701 until 12 February 1702 he was Colonel of the former Sir Edward Dering's Regiment of Foot, and was then appointed Colonel of The Queen's Regiment of Foot. He commanded it until 25 December 1717; it was a Marine regiment from 1703 until 1710. On 1 June 1702, he was appointed Brigadier-General of the Marine Regiments, which had that year been reformed for the War of the Spanish Succession.

Parliament of England
Preceded by Sir Charles Gerard, Bt; Goodwin Wharton	Member of Parliament for Cockermouth; 1698–1702; With: George Fletcher 1698–1702; Thomas Lamplugh 1701–1702	Succeeded by Thomas Lamplugh; James Stanhope
Preceded by Thomas Coulson; Sir Christopher Musgrave, Bt	Member of Parliament for Totnes; 1702–1705; With: Thomas Coulson	Succeeded by Thomas Coulson; Sir Humphrey Mackworth
Parliament of Great Britain
Preceded by William Stephens; John Richmond Webb	Member of Parliament for Newport; 1710–1713; With: William Stephens	Succeeded by William Stephens; John Richmond Webb
Military offices
Preceded by John Cutts	Colonel of William Seymour's Regiment of Foot (Regiment of Marines 1698); 1694–1699	Disbanded
Preceded by The Marquis de Puisar	Colonel of William Seymour's Regiment of Foot; 1701–1702	Succeeded by The Duke of Marlborough
Preceded by Henry Trelawny	Colonel of The Queen's Regiment of Foot (Regiment of Marines 1703–1710); 1702–1717	Succeeded by Hon. Henry Berkeley
