= Portrait of James Stanhope =

1710 painting by Godfrey Kneller

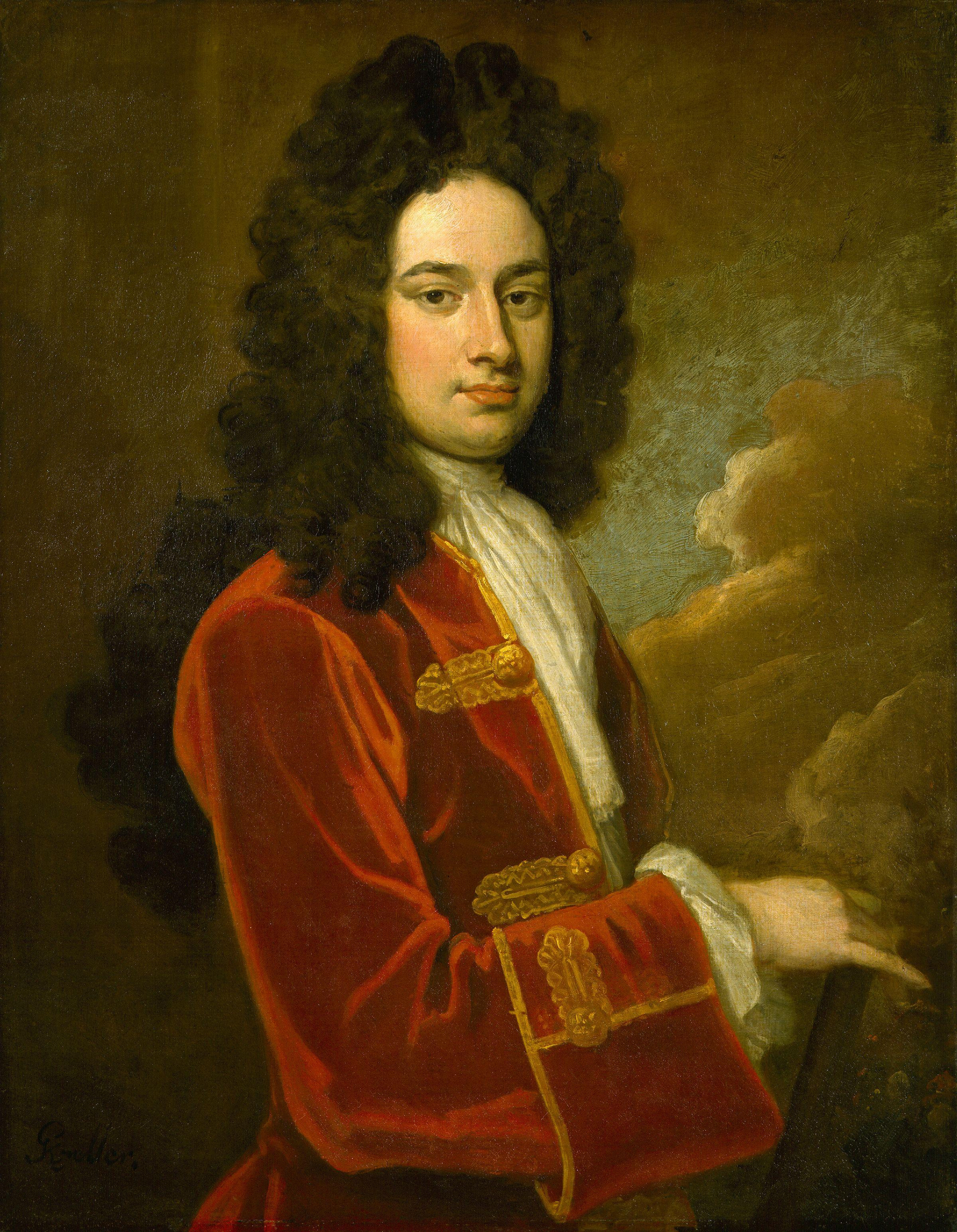
- Artist: Godfrey Kneller
- Year: c.1710
- Type: Oil on canvas, portrait
- Dimensions: 91 cm × 71 cm (35.9 in × 27.9 in)
- Location: National Portrait Gallery, London

Portrait of James Stanhope is a 1710 portrait painting by the artist Godfrey Kneller of British army officer and politician James Stanhope.

== Sitter ==
Stanhope was a Whig Member of Parliament and general. He served in the War of the Spanish Succession and led the British Capture of Minorca in 1708. In 1710 he was prominent in the Allied victory at the Battle of Zaragoza and the capture of Madrid, but following the Allied withdrawal later the same year he was isolated and forced to surrender at the Battle of Brihuega.

Stanhope subsequently went on to become a leading British statesman following the Hanoverian Succession. Appointed Southern Secretary he took a leading role in foreign affairs due to his closeness with George I. Following the Whig Split of 1717 he became the effective leader of the government. He died in 1720 while defending his conduct over the South Sea Bubble and was succeeded by Robert Walpole.

== Painting ==
The work was completed around 1710. It was one of the series of Kit Cat portraits featuring members of the London-based Kit Kat Club. Stanhope is shown in the fashionable periwig of the era. It is now in the collection of the National Portrait Gallery in London.

== Bibliography ==
- Hulme, Geoffrey (ed.) he National Portrait Gallery: An Architectural History. National Portrait Gallery, 2000.
- Magill, Frank N. The 17th and 18th Centuries: Dictionary of World Biography, Volume 4. Routledge, 2013.
