= Guido Starhemberg =

Austrian army officer (1657–1737)

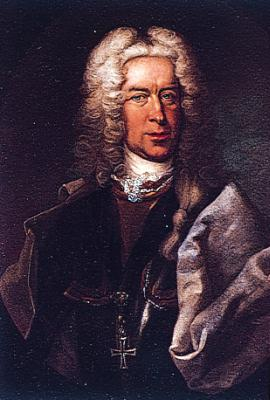
- Guido von Starhemberg
- Born: 11 November 1657; Graz
- Died: 7 March 1737 (aged 79); Vienna
- Relatives: Ernst Rüdiger von Starhemberg
- Military career
- Allegiance: Habsburg monarchy
- Branch: Imperial Army of the Holy Roman Emperor
- Rank: Commander-in-chief
- Conflicts: Great Turkish War; War of the Spanish Succession; • Battle of Almenar; • Battle of Saragossa; • Battle of Villaviciosa
- Other work: Governor of Slavonia

Guido Wald Rüdiger, Graf von Starhemberg (11 November 1657 – 7 March 1737) was an Austrian army officer. He is considered one of the great military leaders from the early modern period.

== Biography ==
By birth member of an old House of Starhemberg, Guido was the eldest child and only son of Count Bartholomäus von Starhemberg (1625-1676) and his wife, Baroness Esther von Windisch-Graetz (d. 1697). He was a cousin of Ernst Rüdiger von Starhemberg (1638–1701), the famous commander of Vienna during the Turkish siege of 1683, and acted as his aide-de-camp during that siege. Guido followed his cousin, and later Prince Eugene of Savoy, in battles against the Turks.

In the War of the Spanish Succession, Starhemberg fought in Italy and Spain. Between 1706 and 1708 he was the commander-in-chief of the imperial army in Hungary, leading military operations against the insurgents of Francis II Rákóczi. In 1708, he was appointed Supreme Commander of the Austrians in Spain.

Together with James Stanhope he succeeded in conquering Madrid in 1710, after previously gaining victories at Almenar and Saragossa. In December, however, he was forced to leave the city by the lack of support by its inhabitants for the Habsburg pretender. After the subsequent defeats at the Battle of Brihuega and the Battle of Villaviciosa (1710), he had to pull back to Catalonia, where he was made viceroy when Archduke Charles returned to Austria.

After the Peace of Utrecht (1713), archduke Charles, now Emperor Charles VI, ordered him to abandon Catalonia. He pulled back with his troops to Genoa on English ships.

When he died in 1737, he was Governor of Slavonia.
