= Battle of Saragossa =

1710 battle during the War of the Spanish Succession

Coordinates: 41°36′31″N 00°53′23″W

- Part of the War of the Spanish Succession
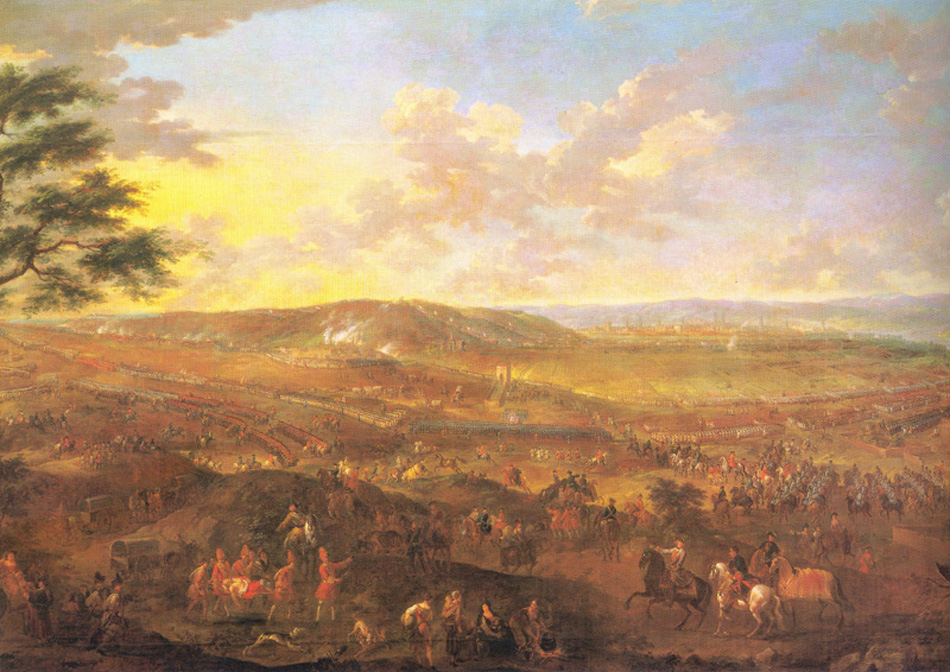
- A painting of the battle
Date	20 August 1710
Location	Zaragoza, Spain
Result	Grand Alliance victory

Belligerents
Grand Alliance: Austria; Pro-Habsburg Spain; Great Britain; Dutch Republic; Portugal	Pro-Bourbon Spain; France

Commanders and leaders
(Habsburg monarchy) Guido Starhemberg (Kingdom of Great Britain) Earl Stanhope (Portugal) Count of Atalaia	(Spain) Marquis de Bay (Spain) Duke of Havré †

Units involved
(Habsburg monarchy) Imperial Army (Kingdom of Great Britain) British Army (Dutch Republic) Dutch States Army (Portugal) Portuguese Army; Spanish Force	(Spain) Spanish Army (Kingdom of France) French Royal Army

Strength
22,000–30,000; • 17,000 infantrymen; • 5,000 cavalrymen	18,000–23,000; • 14,000 infantrymen; • 6,000 cavalrymen; up to 36 guns

Casualties and losses
1,500 to 1,600 dead or wounded	approx. 6,000 dead or wounded, or between 5,000 and 10,000; 5,000 to 7,000 captured 20–36 cannons captured 87 flags and standards captured

The Battle of Saragossa, 20 August 1710, took place during the War of the Spanish Succession, near Zaragoza in Spain. A slightly inferior Franco-Bourbon Spanish army commanded by the Marquis de Bay was severely defeated by a Grand Alliance force under Guido Starhemberg, which included Habsburg Spanish troops.

Victory allowed the Allies to enter Madrid, but lack of supplies forced them to retreat, while defeats at Brihuega in November and Villaviciosa in December effectively ended hopes of deposing Philip V of Spain. The Marquis de Bey had already faced the forces of the alliance; he had successfully besieged Ciudad Rodrigo and defeated them at La Gudiña. Saragossa placed Starhemberg among the capable commanders from his time.

== Background ==
The 1710 campaign began on 15 May when a Franco-Spanish army led by Philip V and Villadarias, advanced on Balaguer. Allied forces in Catalonia under Guido Starhemberg halted this attempt by blocking them from crossing the Segre river. Philip made another attempt in June, but was defeated at Almenar on 27 July and withdrew to Zaragoza, while Villadarias was replaced by the Marquis de Bay.

After reaching Zaragoza on 9 August, de Bay positioned his troops with the river Ebro on his left and the Torrero heights to the right. On 15 August, an Allied cavalry attack was repulsed, followed by five days of minor skirmishes before the Allies crossed the Ebro in force on 19 August and were allowed to deploy during the night.

== Battle ==
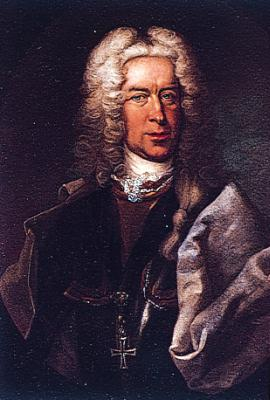
Austrian commander Guido Starhemberg

Order of battle of Starhemberg's army shows that he had thirty-seven battalions of infantry and forty-three squadrons opposed to the Spanish-Bourbon army of thirty-eight battalions and fifty-four squadrons. The Austrian commander-in-chief "made every exertion of zeal, judgement and courage to bring the outcome of the battle to a happy issue."The Allied left, composed of Catalonian and Dutch troops, was led by the Count of Atalaya (Atalaia), the right by Stanhope, made up of British, Portuguese and Austrian cavalry, with Starhemberg in charge of the centre, mainly German, Austrian and Spanish infantry.

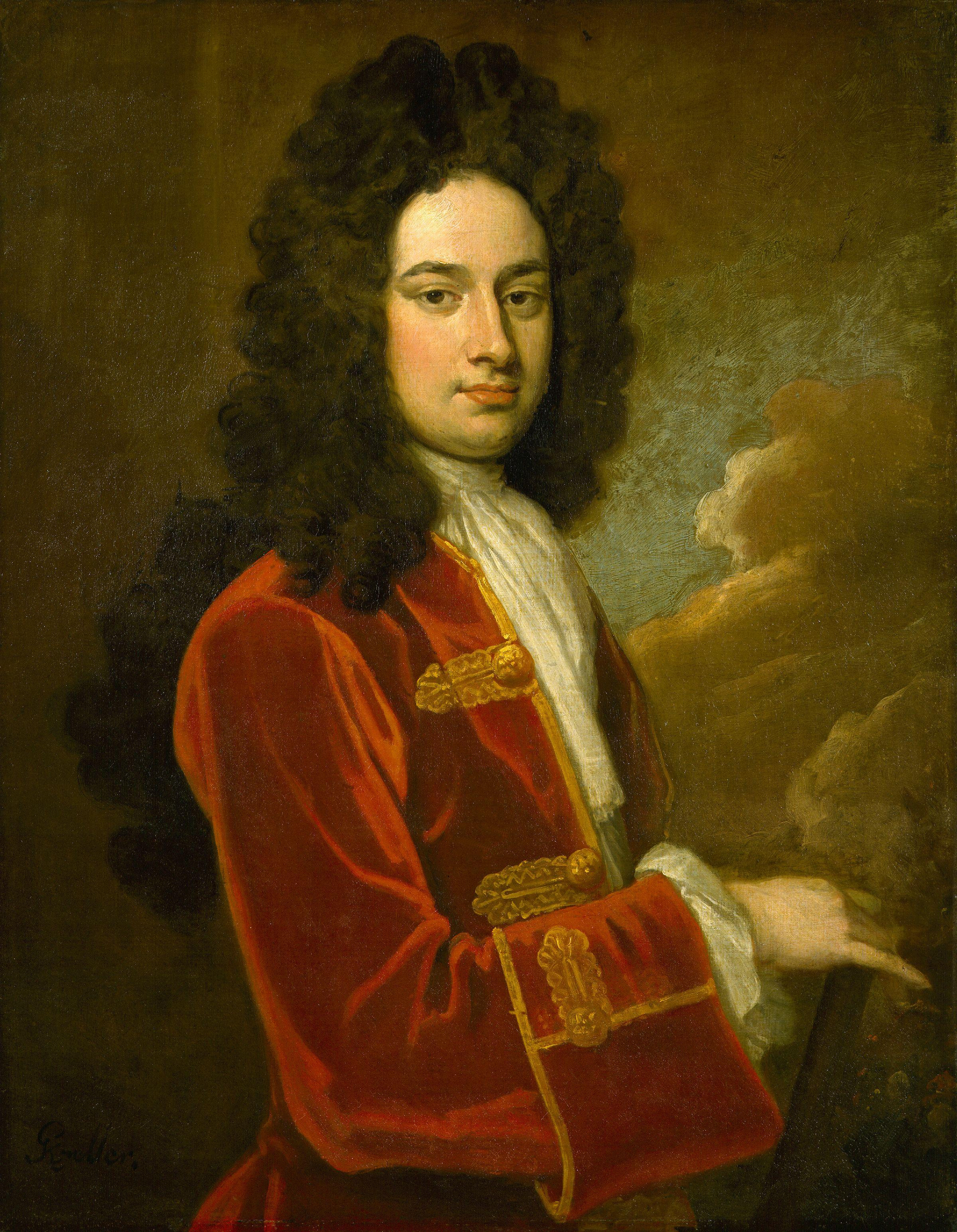
Portrait of James Stanhope by Sir Godfrey Kneller

On 20 August at 08:00 an artillery-duel started which lasted four hours before Stanhope's Austro-Anglo-Portuguese force charged the Bourbon-Spanish left. At first the Spanish and Walloon veteran troops of the Bourbon army seemed to gain the advantage, having defeated a body of eight Portuguese squadrons, which they chased from the field. This opened a gap in the Bourbon lines, which Stanhope exploited to rout the disorganized Bourbon-Spanish soldiers, while the attacks of the Bourbon army on the center and the left were repulsed as well, but they fought with tenacity throughout the battlefield. The Dutch-Catalonians under Atalaia repelled the onslaught of the Bourbons, inflicting heavy casualties for the latter; some of the Bourbon recruits were scattered and routed there. The central Austro-Germans and Habsburg-Spanish, heading by Starhemberg himself, descended under heavy fire into the defile of Barranco de la Muerte^{[es]} (lit. "Death's Canyon"), which had earned its name with its historical reputation, and then resurfaced straight toward the enemy. The Bourbon-Spaniards resisted stubbornly, but were eventually driven back in disarray. "The defeat of their right wing decided theirs." Only the Spanish veterans on the Bourbon left continued their fierce resistance to Stanhope's entire right wing on the high ground and did not surrender until their numbers were critically reduced.

The antiquated custom of the French and Spanish squadrons of halting to fire their pistols and carbines placed them at a grave disadvantage when their opponents charged with swords in hand.

They gave us the fire, but by the blessing of God we gave them no liberty to let them fire again but were upon them in a moment of time, cutting and hewing them down in hand.

— an Allied dragoon

The battle followed the same pattern as at Almenar: the Allies first repulsed fierce Bourbon cavalry charges and then counter-attacked with their infantry, pushing the Franco-Spanish back. Starhemberg's decisive offensive on the other two flanks could have been further developed if the right-flank command had learned of it earlier. Still, in less than three hours, the Allied army won a comprehensive victory, capturing the Bourbon artillery along with 73 standards or along with up to 87 flags and standards. Between 5,000 and 10,000 Franco-Spanish soldiers were killed or wounded (possibly, around 6,000), and another 5,000 or 7,000 captured, with Allied losses estimated as 1,500 or 1,600 men dead or wounded. (Note: § External links)

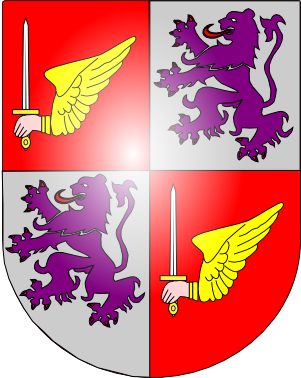
Coat of arms of the Count of Atalaia

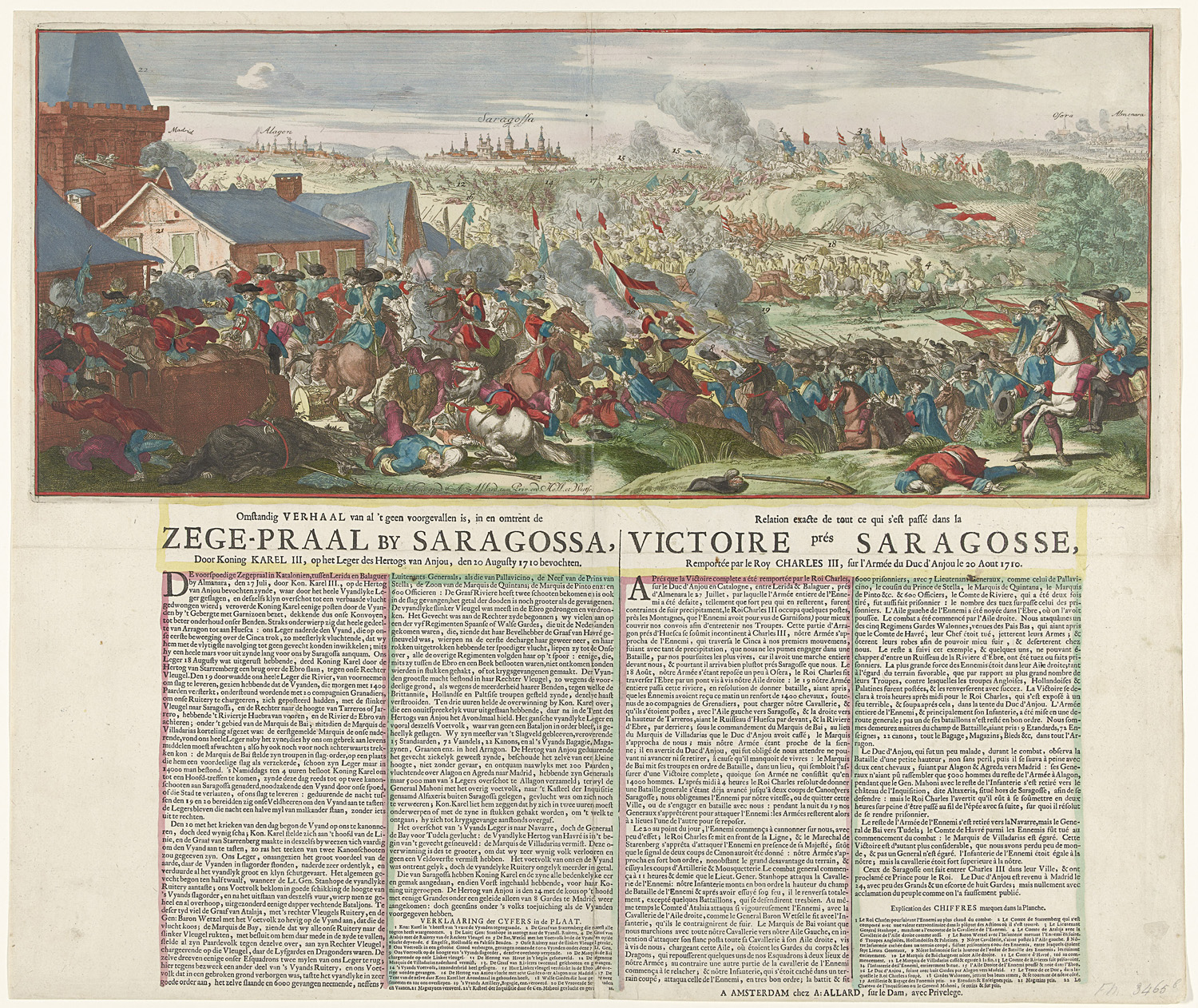
Victory of the allied troops over the Bourbons near Zaragoza. Colored etching printed in Amsterdam by Abraham Allard. At the bottom, a description of the four-column battle in Dutch and French. Amsterdam, Rijksmuseum. The print reuses a plate by Romeyn de Hooghe from 1690 depicting the victory of William III of Orange over James II of England.

== Aftermath ==
Archduke Charles entered Zaragoza the next day. The defeat of the army of Philip V of Spain was severe, the way to Madrid was open. Philip V abandoned Madrid on 9 September and went to Valladolid. Archduke Charles entered a very hostile and almost empty Madrid on 28 September. Charles commented: "This city is a desert!" In the winter of 1710, Archduke Charles and the allied troops had to abandon Madrid, due to the great opposition of the people of Madrid and the dangerous strategic situation. After this, the British army suffered a defeat at the Battle of Brihuega, and the rest of the allied army was defeated at the Battle of Villaviciosa.

== Sources ==
- Albi, Julio (1992). La Caballería española, un eco de clarines (in Spanish). Madrid: Tabapress S.A.
- Bodart, Gaston (1908). Militär-historisches Kriegs-Lexikon (1618–1905) (in German). Vienna & Leipzig: C. W. Stern.
- Cust, Edward Sir (1858). Annals of the wars of the eighteenth century: compiled from the most authentic histories of the period, Volume 1. Mitchell's military library.
- Falkner, James (2015). The War of the Spanish Succession. 1701–1714. Pen and Sword Books. ISBN 978-1-78159-031-7.
- Frey, Linda and Marsha (1995). The Treaties of the War of the Spanish Succession: an Historical and Critical Dictionary. Greenwood Publishing Group. ISBN 978-0-313-27884-6.
- Kamen, Henry (2000). Felipe V, el rey que reinó dos veces (in Spanish). Madrid: Ediciones Temas de Hoy S.A. Colección: Historia.
- Stanhope, Philip Henry (1832). History of the War of the Succession in Spain. London: John Murray.
- Tucker, Spencer C., ed. (2011). A Global Chronology of Conflict: From the Ancient World to the Modern Middle East. Vol. II. ABC-CLIO.
