= Pedro Manuel de Ataíde =

Portuguese nobleman and army officer (1665–1722)

- Born: 1665; Viana do Castelo, Portugal
- Died: 19 September 1722 (aged 56–57) Vienna, Austria
- Allegiance: Kingdom of Portugal
- Rank: General
- Conflicts: War of the Spanish Succession; Battle of Almansa; Battle of Zaragoza; Battle of Villaviciosa

Pedro Manuel de Ataíde, 5th Count of Atalaia (1665 – 19 September 1722) was a Portuguese Army officer and nobleman who served during the War of the Spanish Succession.

== Life ==
He was the son of Luís Manuel de Távora, 4th Count of Atalaia and Maria Madalena de Noronha de Sousa, daughter of the 1st Marquis of Minas.

In 1694, together with his cousin João de Sousa, 3rd Marquis of Minas, he had a conflict with the Corregedor of Bairro Alto, which resulted in the death of the Corregedor. Both young men fled to France, where they came under the protection of François de Neufville, duc de Villeroi and fought in his army.

After being pardoned by King Peter II of Portugal in 1704, he returned to Portugal and served under his father and uncle, supreme commander António Luís de Sousa, 2nd Marquis of Minas, in the War of the Spanish Succession. He participated in the Portuguese occupation of Madrid in 1706 and the following retreat to Catalonia.

In 1707, while serving in Valencia, he became a Knight of the Order of Santiago,

He distinguished himself in the Battle of Almansa, where he commanded the right wing. With his father killed and his uncle recalled to Lisbon, he became the commander of the Portuguese forces in Catalonia.

He commanded the Portuguese and allied forces at the Battle of Zaragoza and the Battle of Villaviciosa.

After the allied defeat in 1713, he accompanied Charles III to Vienna. He was appointed Grandee of Spain, and Viceroy of Sardinia, General of the Cavalry in Naples and Governor of Castelnuovo.

In 1716, his son, Luís Manuel, was killed by an unknown assassin in one of several high-profile assassinations of Portugal's titled nobility.
