= Capture of Minorca (1708) =

1708 Military operation

- Part of the War of the Spanish Succession
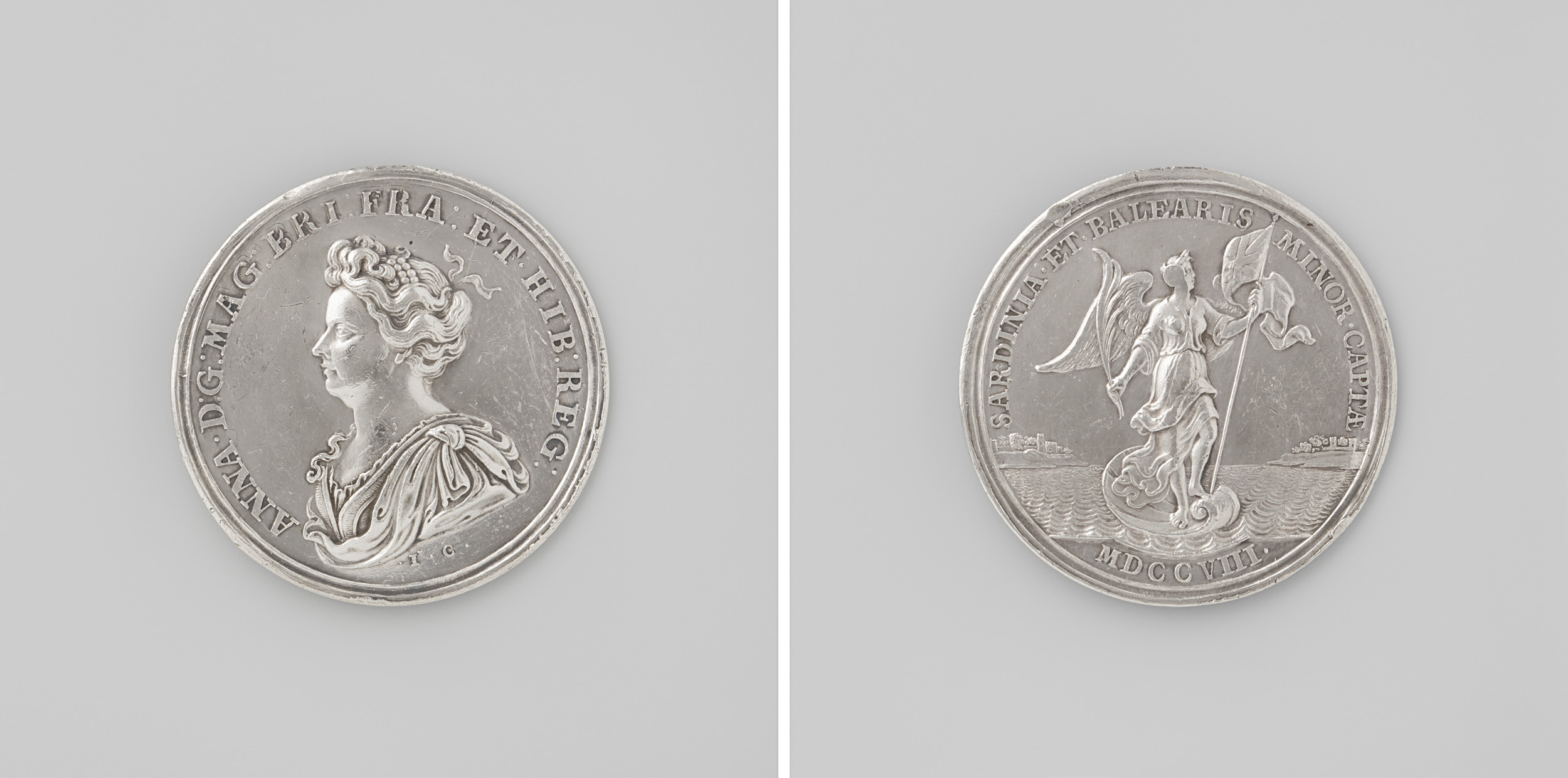
- British silver crowns struck to commemorate the capture of Minorca and Sardinia in 1708
Date	14–21 September 1708
Location	Menorca 39.865°N 4.305°E
Result	Anglo-Dutch victory

Belligerents
Great Britain; Dutch Republic	Spain; France

Commanders and leaders
(Kingdom of Great Britain) James Stanhope (Kingdom of Great Britain) George Wade (Kingdom of Great Britain) Sir John Leake	

The Capture of Minorca saw the island of Menorca captured from Spain by British and Dutch forces acting on behalf of Charles VI, Holy Roman Emperor - the Austrian claimant to the Spanish throne - in September 1708 during the War of the Spanish Succession. The British would later annex the island as their own possession at the Treaty of Utrecht (1713).

== Background ==
Since 1702 a war had been fought over who would inherit the Spanish throne with Britain and the Dutch supporting the Austrian candidate while France and her allies supported a French candidate. In 1704 the Anglo-Dutch fleet had captured Gibraltar and defeated a Spanish fleet at the Battle of Málaga. Allied forces had also landed in Catalunya where they captured Barcelona in 1705. The Catalans largely supported the Austrian claimant and many joined the Allied armies.

== Landing ==
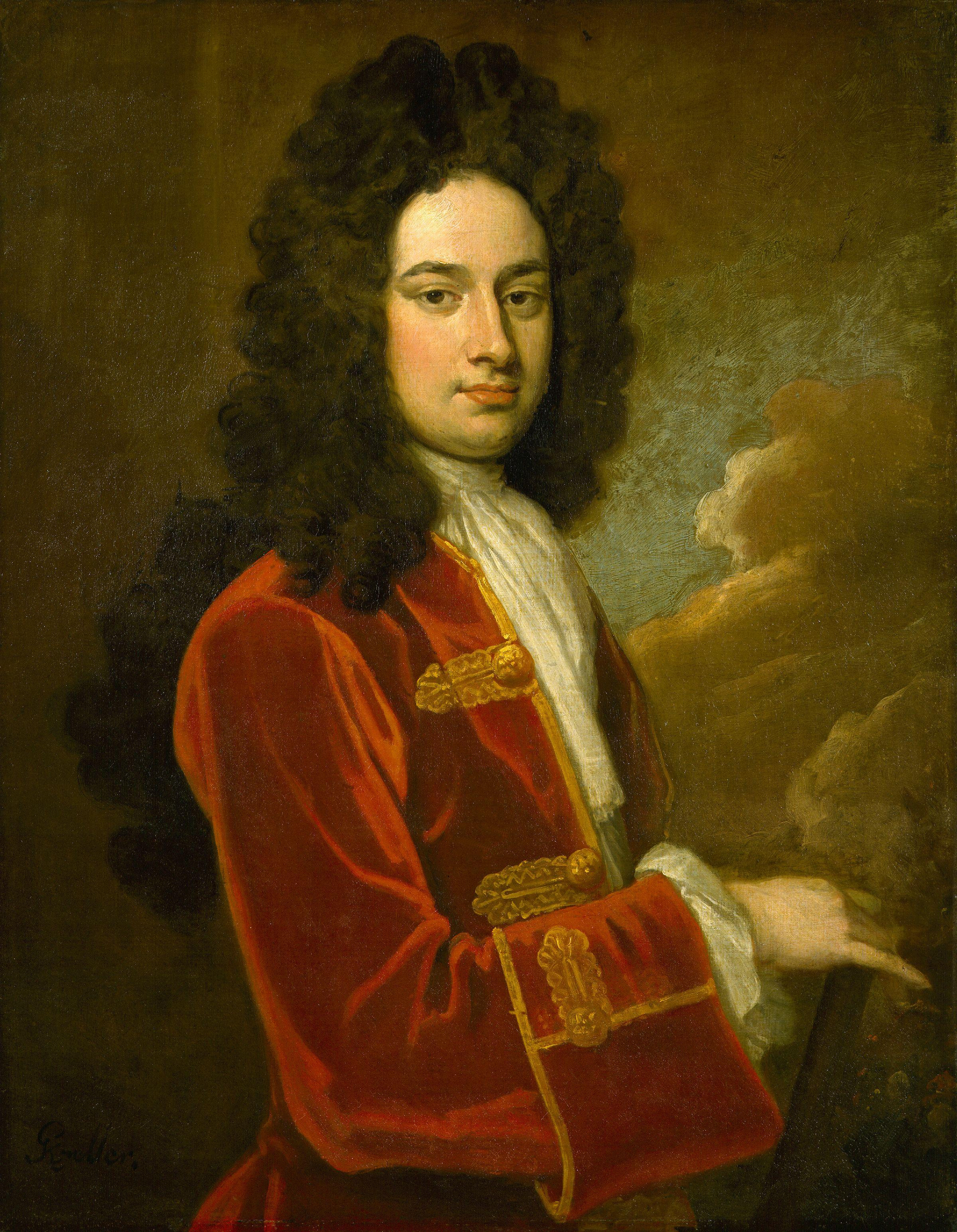
Portrait of James Stanhope by Godfrey Kneller. General James Stanhope commanded the Anglo-Dutch forces which captured Menorca.

On 14 September 1708 an Anglo-Dutch naval force under the command of General James Stanhope landed on the island of Menorca and laid siege to the town of Mahón. Sir Edward Whitaker, with his Admiral's flag in HMS Northumberland, went to join Sir John Leake in the Mediterranean where he assisted in the capture of Menorca taking Fornells and Ciutadella de Menorca. The island's inhabitants were—like most Catalans—pro-Austria, and greeted the British and Dutch soldiers as liberators. A week later the Franco-Spanish garrison surrendered.

== Aftermath ==
Realising the potential of Menorca as a British naval base, the British moved to fully take control of it — and received acknowledgement of this at the Treaty of Utrecht. In the aftermath of the island's capture trade boomed, and the British increased prosperity on the island by spending large amounts rebuilding the island's fortifications.

The British occupied the island on and off until 1802 when it was finally handed back to Spain as part of the Treaty of Amiens. During that time Menorca became an important part of Britain's security architecture in the Mediterranean Sea with a major naval base.

== See also ==
- Battle of Minorca (1756)
- Siege of Fort St Philip (1756)
- Invasion of Minorca (1781)
- Capture of Minorca (1798)

== Bibliography ==
- Chartrand, Rene. Gibraltar 1779-83: The Great Siege. Osprey, 2006.
- Rodger NAM. Command of the Ocean: A Naval History of Britain, 1649-1815. Penguin Books, 2006.
- Simms, Brendan. Three Victories and a Defeat: The Rise and Fall of the First British Empire. Penguin Books (2008)
