= Battle of Villaviciosa =

1710 battle in the War of the Spanish Succession

Coordinates: 40.7864°N 2.83639°W

- Part of the War of the Spanish Succession
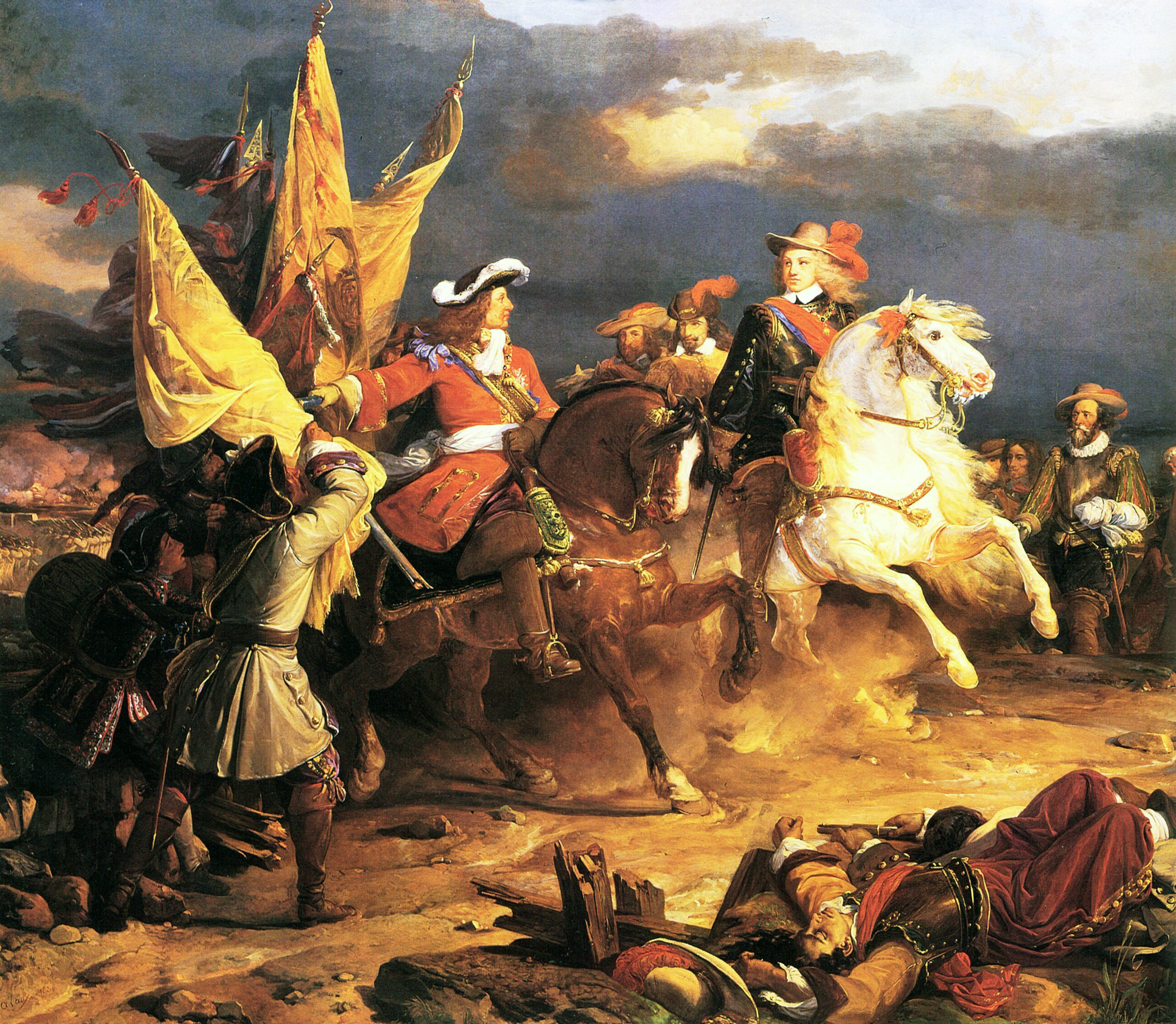
- Vendôme (left) presents the standards to Philip V of Spain (right) at Villaviciosa by Jean Alaux.
Date	11 December 1710
Location	Villaviciosa de Tajuña, Guadalajara, Spain
Result	Franco-Spanish victory

Belligerents
Bourbon Spain; France	(Habsburg monarchy) Austria; Habsburg Spain; Dutch Republic; Portugal; Great Britain

Commanders and leaders
(Kingdom of France) Duke of Vendôme (Spain) Philip V (Spain) Count of Aguilar (Spain) Marquis of Valdecañas	(Habsburg monarchy) Guido Starhemberg; Antoni de Villarroel (Portugal) Count of Atalaia

Strength
20,000	12,000 (Note: (excluding Charles' cavalry; see § Background))

Casualties and losses
2,000–4,000 dead or wounded	3,000 dead or wounded 2,000–5,000 captured

Spain

The Battle of Villaviciosa (11 December 1710) was a battle between a Franco-Spanish army led by Louis Joseph, Duke of Vendôme and Philip V of Spain and a Grand Alliance army commanded by Austrian General Guido Starhemberg. The battle took place during the War of the Spanish Succession, one day after a Vendôme's army overran a smaller British force under James Stanhope at Brihuega. Both Philip V of Spain and the Archduke Charles of Austria claimed victory, but the number of dead and wounded, the number of artillery and other weapons abandoned by the Allied army and the battle's strategic consequences for the war confirmed victory for Philip.

The battle was largely determined by the Spanish dragoons commanded by the Marquis of Valdecañas and the Count of Aguilar, which far exceeded the opposing forces. The Austro-allied forces retreated, pursued by Spanish cavalry, and the allied army was reduced to 6,000 or 7,000 men when it reached Barcelona (one of the few places in Spain still recognizing Charles' authority) on 6 January.

== Background ==
In 1710, 23,000 Grand Alliance troops invaded Spain to secure the country for the Habsburg Charles VI, Holy Roman Emperor. After their victories over pro-Bourbon Spanish troops at Almenar on 27 July and at Saragossa on 20 August, Allied forces captured Madrid for the second time, with Charles VI entering the city on 21 September. However, the Allied army had been whittled down from casualties suffered at Almenar and Saragossa, along with numerous skirmishes with pro-Bourbon Spanish militiamen, and was unable to hold the areas it had captured.

As the Allied position in Madrid was untenable, on 9 November they evacuated the city and began retreating to Catalonia, pursued by pro-Bourbon Spanish cavalry under the Marquis of Valdecañas. Charles VI, leading 2,000 cavalry, undertook a rapid march to Barcelona, while the rest of the Allied army was split in two. Austrian General Guido Starhemberg led one force of 12,000 men a day's march ahead of the second force, which consisted of 5,000 British troops under General James Stanhope. Stanhope's army was defeated in a surprise attack by a Franco-Spanish army under the Duke of Vendôme at Brihuega on 9 December; Stanhope and most of his men were taken prisoner.

When Starhemberg was informed of the attack on Stanhope's troops, he ordered his men to assist them, unaware that they had already surrendered. On the morning of December 10, Vendôme's army was waiting on the plain of Villaviciosa. Compared to the 14,000 men under Starhemberg's command, Vendôme was able to muster a force of 20,000 troops for the battle, including numerous units which had joined him during the morning. Both armies deployed in two lines on parallel ridges, which was the custom of the time.

== Bourbon deployment ==
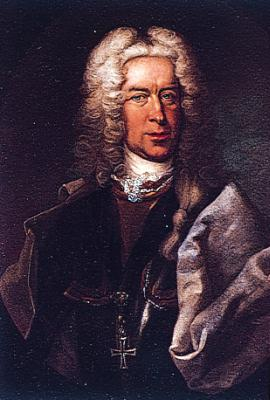
Austrian commander Guido Starhemberg

=== First line ===
==== Right wing ====
Commander: Marquis of Valdecañas (Philip V of Spain participated in the battle in the cavalry squadrons of the right wing).

Cavalry squadrons:

- Dragoons of Caylus
- Dragoons of Vallejo (three squadrons)
- Dragoons of Osuna
- Guards of corps (four squadrons)
- Old Granada
- Piñateli
- Old order (four squadrons)

==== Center ====
Commander: Count of Torres

Infantry battalions:

- Spanish guards (three battalions)
- Walloon guards (three battalions)
- Comesfort (one battalion)
- Castellar (one battalion)
- Gueldres (one battalion)
- Benmel (one battalion)
- Santal of Gende (one battalion)
- Armada (one battalion)
- Lombardy (one battalion)
- Milan (one battalion)
- Uribe (one battalion)
- Mulfeta (one battalion)

==== Left wing ====
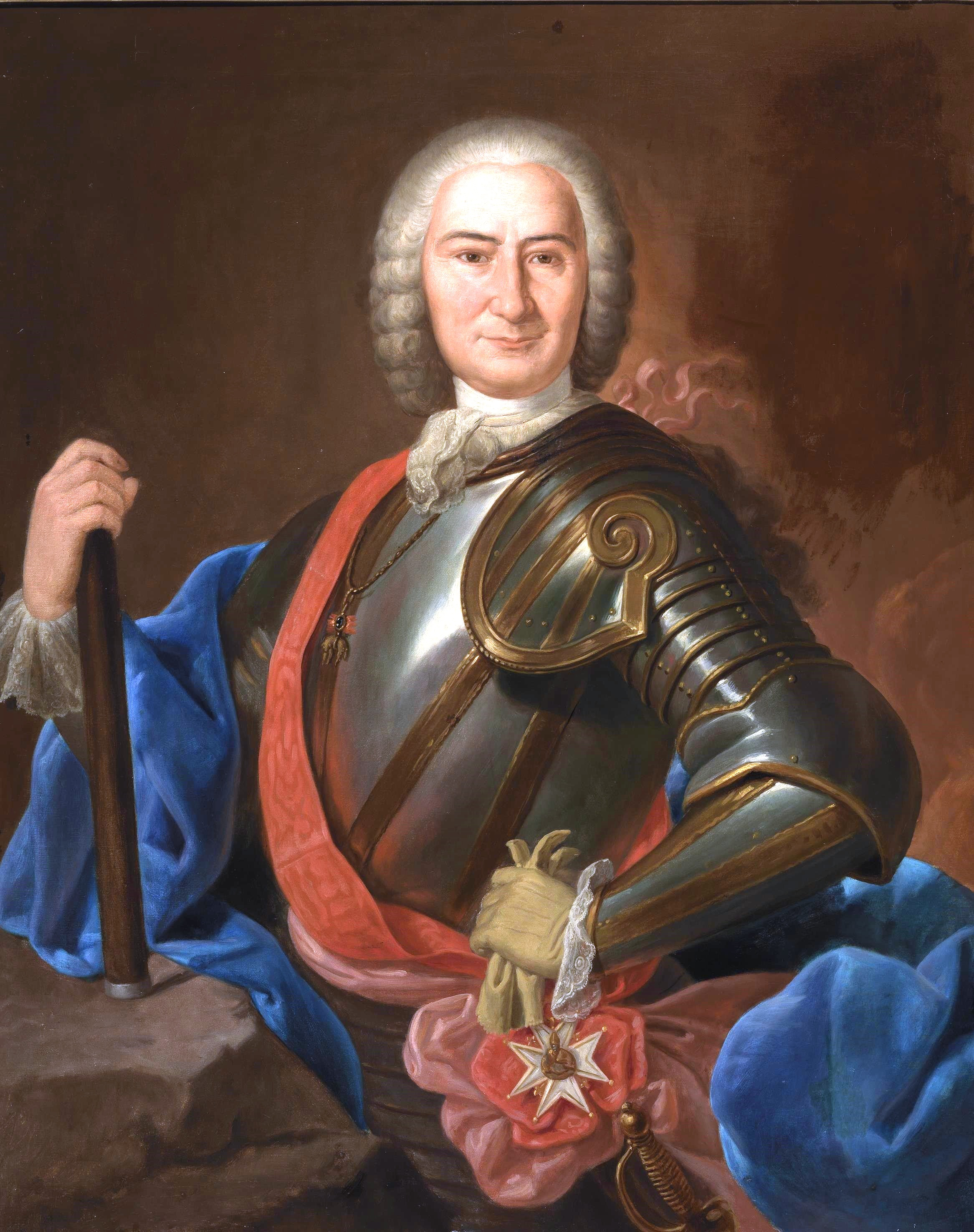
The Duke of Montemar

Commander: Count of Aguilar (the future Duke of Montemar participated in the battle under the Count of Aguilar as field marshal).

Cavalry squadrons:

- Dragoons of Marimon
- Dragoons of Quimalol
- Dragoons of Grinao
- Old Santiago
- Bargas
- Reina (four squadrons)

=== Second line ===
==== Right wing ====
Commander: Count of Merode (subordinate to the Marquis of Valdecañas)

Cavalry squadrons:

- Asturias (four squadrons)
- Muerte
- Pozoblanco (four squadrons)
- Estrella
- Lanzarote (three squadrons)
- Extremadura (three squadrons)

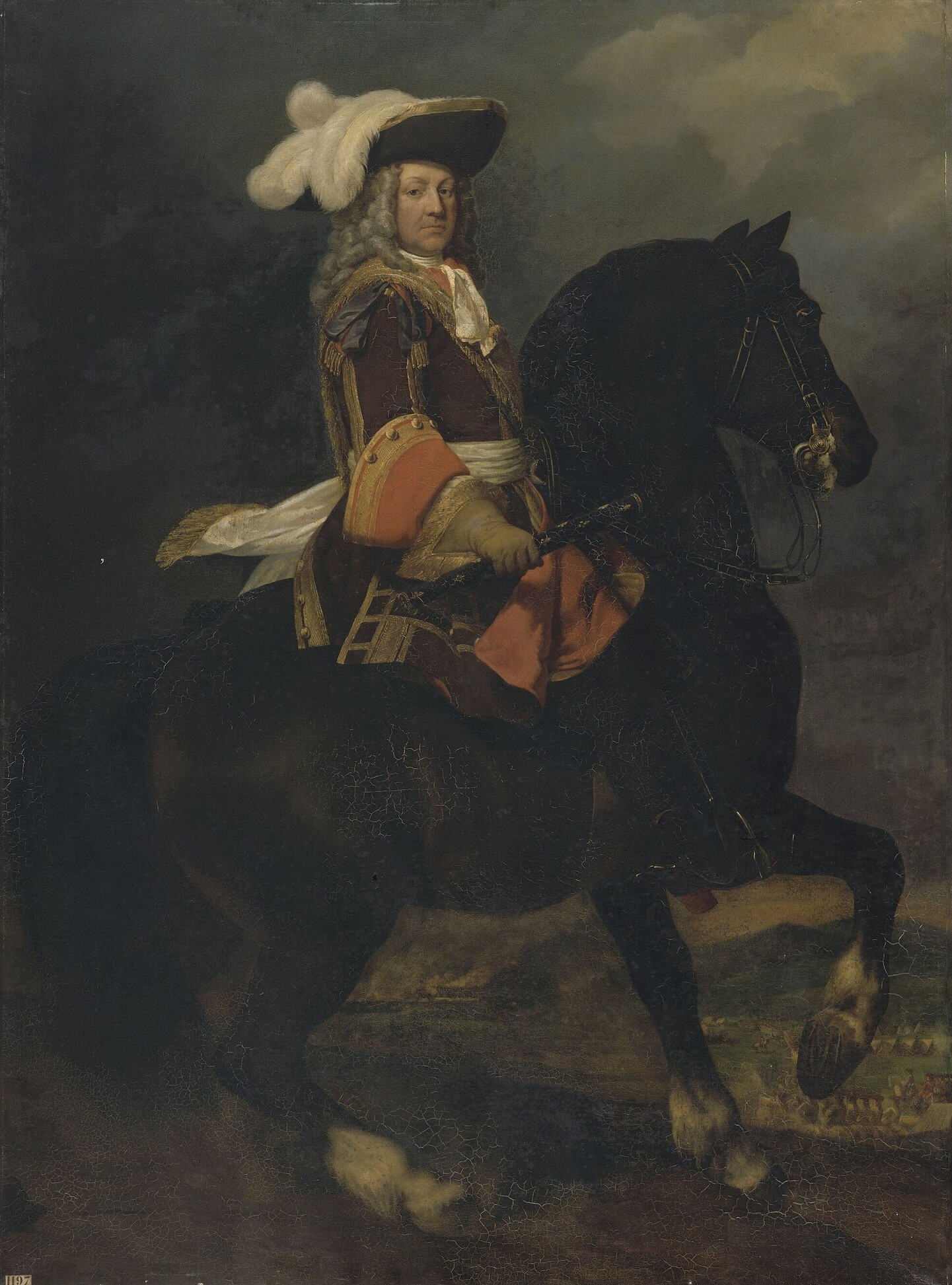
Franco-Spanish army commander Louis Joseph, Duke of Vendôme

==== Center ====
Commander: Lieutenant-General Pedro de Zúñiga

Infantry battalions:

- Castile (one battalion)
- Murcia (one battalion)
- Trujillo (one battalion)
- Savoy (one battalion)
- Écija (one battalion)
- Naples Sea (one battalion)
- Extremadura (one battalion)
- Toledo (one battalion)
- Sicily (one battalion)
- Coria (one battalion)
- León (one battalion)
- Vitoria (one battalion)
- Segovia (two battalions)
- Naples (one battalion)

==== Left wing ====
Commander: Lieutenant-General Navamorquende (under the Count of Aguilar)

Cavalry squadrons:

- New Roussillon (four squadrons)
- New Granada
- Velasco
- Carvajal
- Cavalry of Raja
- Cavalry of Jaén
- Old Roussillon (four squadrons)

=== Artillery ===
Commander: Marquis of Canales (23 pieces)

== Battle ==
The battle began during the afternoon, lasting until midnight. Each army had 23 pieces of artillery, deployed in three batteries. The artillery fire began simultaneously, damaging both armies. The Marquis de Valdecañas, commanding the cavalry in the Bourbon right wing (with King Philip), began the attack. Valdecañas sent his cavalry against the allied left wing, composed of Austrian infantry and Portuguese and pro-Habsburg Spanish cavalry under Imperial General von Frankenberg. The Austrian infantry and Portuguese cavalry tried to stop the Bourbon charge before yielding, and the left wing was destroyed. Pro-Bourbon Spanish troops captured the artillery pieces, defeating British and Dutch forces sent to aid the left wing. With the allied left wing defeated, the archduke's infantry advanced toward the Franco-Spanish center and drove back their infantry. The Marquis of Toy tried to prevent losses in the center and avoid the division of the army, but most of his men were taken prisoner by the Portuguese.

Although the Bourbons in the center were in difficulty, the Count of Aguilar threw his cavalry against the archduke's right wing (commanded by General Starhemberg and comprising the best grenadiers and cavalry squadrons of the allied army). The allies were unable to stop the Count of Aguilar's cavalry. The archduke's right wing was saved from disaster by support from the center, led by pro-Habsburg Spanish General Antoni de Villarroel. Starhemberg regrouped his forces, repulsed the Count of Aguilar's cavalry and charged the Bourbon left wing. After capturing the left-wing cannons, Starhemberg launched his army against the center.

The Bourbon center and left wing began to retreat, and the right-wing's cavalry pursued the allied left wing. The Count of Aguilar then attacked the archduke's right wing with his dragoons. Although Austrian and Portuguese cavalry under the Count of Atalaia resisted the first charge, Aguilar's cavalry broke the allied right wing. Valdecañas' cavalry also dealt a severe blow to allied army, and Lt. Gen. Mahony and Field Marshal Amezaga's troops charged from the right wing. Starhemberg, in return, launched three cavalry charges against them. During the fighting, Amezaga was wounded in the face. Starhemberg's forces retreated to a nearby forest to escape Bourbon cavalry, and the allied forces began their withdrawal under cover of night. British regiments suffered heavy losses during the battle; Brigadier-General Nicholas Wedig Lepell, the most senior British officer at the battle, reported two regiments had been cut off while over 107 men were missing from his own unit, and he only had two cavalry squadrons still available.

== Result ==
Although Philip V of Spain and the Archduke Charles both claimed victory, the number of dead and wounded, the weapons abandoned by the allied army, and the strategic consequences of the war confirmed Bourbon victory on the Spanish front.

Starhemberg continued his retreat, harassed by Spanish cavalry. In battle, he lost 3,000 dead or wounded and 5,000 captured. His army was reduced to 6,000 or 7,000 men when he reached Barcelona. The Spanish throne was finally secured for Philip when Charles left Spain in April 1711 to become Holy Roman Emperor after the death of his older brother.

== Sources ==
- Albi, Julio (1992). La Caballería Española: Un Eco de Clarines (in Spanish) Madrid: Tabapress S.A.
- Cust, Sir Edward (1862). Annals of the Wars of the Eighteenth Century: Compiled from the Most Authentic Histories of the Period. J. Murray.
- Frey, Linda and Marsha (1995). The Treaties of the War of the Spanish Succession. Greenwood Publishing Group. ISBN 978-0-313-27884-6.
- Herrero, Mª Dolores (1994). La Artilería Española, al pie de los cañones.(in Spanish) Madrid: Tabapress S.A. Madrid.
- Kamen, Henry (2000). Felipe V, el Rey que reinó dos veces. (in Spanish) Madrid: Ediciones Temas de Hoy S.A. Colección: Historia.
- Tumath, Andrew (2013). "The British Army in Catalonia after the Battle of Brihuega 1710-1712". Journal of the Society for Army Historical Research. 91 (367): 182–205. JSTOR 44232207.
- Bodart, Gaston (1908). Militär-historisches Kriegs-Lexikon (1618–1905) (in German). Vienna & Leipzig: C. W. Stern.

== General references ==
- Mckay, Derek 1983). The Rise of the Great Powers (1648-1815). New York: Longman. ISBN 0-582-48554-1.
- Stanhope, Philip Henry (1832). History of the War of the Succession in Spain. London: John Murray.
- Symcox, Geoffrey (1973). War, Diplomacy, and Imperialism (1618–1763). New York: Harper Torchbooks. ISBN 0-06-139500-5.
