= Abraham Allard =

Dutch map engraver (1676–1725)

- Born: 8 January 1676; Amsterdam
- Died: 26 January 1725 (aged 49); Amsterdam
- Occupation: Printmaker, painter, publisher, printer, engraver
- Parent(s): Carel Allard

Abraham Allard (8 January 1676, Amsterdam - 26 January 1725, Amsterdam) was a Dutch map engraver active in Amsterdam.

== Maps ==
Map Duchy of Brabant (c. 1750) by Abraham Allard, published in Amsterdam by Johannes Covens (1720-1772) and Cornelis Mortier (1720-1772).

Steden distancie meet tafel van Nederland, tot Paris toe (c. 1710) by Abraham Allard.

Les Bas Sevennes, dans le Languedoc ou Le diocese de Montpellier (c. 1700) by Abraham Allard.

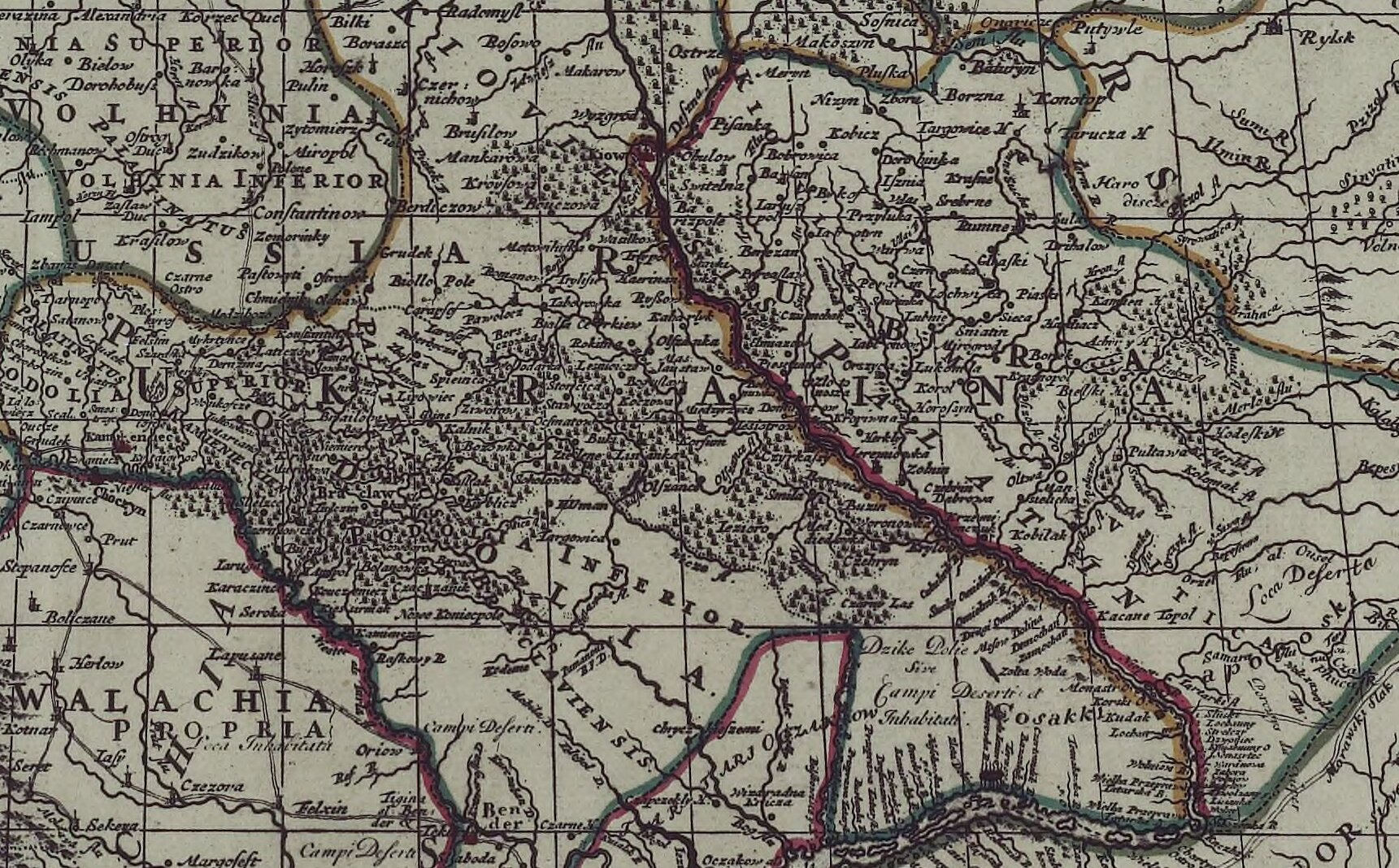
Ukraine fragment of Poland and Moscovia (1710) by Abraham Allard.
