= Thomas Lamplugh (1656–1737) =

English politician (1656–1737)

Thomas Lamplugh (9 October 1656 – 1737) was an English Whig politician. He sat as MP for Cockermouth from 19 February 1702 till 1708.

He was the first son of Colonel John Lamplugh (died 1688) and his third wife, Frances, the daughter of Thomas Lamplugh. He was educated at Queen's College, Oxford and matriculated in 1676. In 1695, he married Frances (died 1745), the daughter of Abraham Moline and they had two sons who predeceased him and six daughters (five daughters predeceased him).

Lamplugh was first involved in elections in 1700, when he supported Sir Gilfrid Lawson, 6th Baronet at a Cumberland by-election. He served as Sheriff of Cumberland from 1700 till 1701. In December 1701, he stood for Parliament at Cockermouth but was defeated. In February 1702, he won Cockermouth in a by-election. He retained his seat in the 1702 general election and the 1705 general election. In February 1708, he departed Parliament and did not stand again.

He died in 1737 and was buried on 21 May 1737.
