= James Stanhope, 1st Earl Stanhope =

British army officer and politician (1673–1721)

General The Right Honourable The Earl Stanhope PC
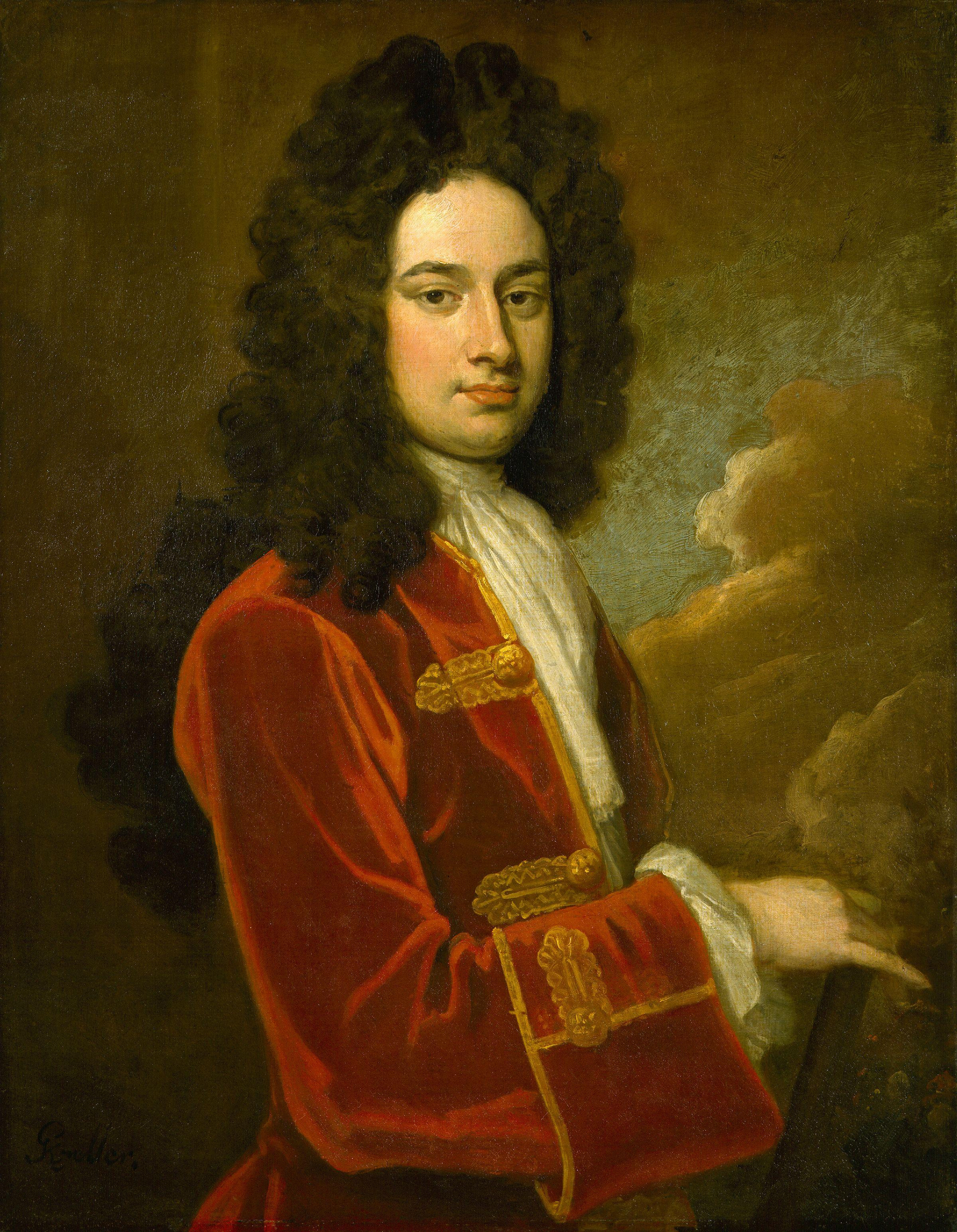
- Portrait of James Stanhope by Sir Godfrey Kneller, c. 1710

Secretary of State for the Northern Department
- In office 16 March 1718 – 5 February 1721
- Monarch: George I
- Preceded by: The Earl of Sunderland
- Succeeded by: The Viscount Townshend
- In office 12 December 1716 – 12 April 1717
- Monarch: George I
- Preceded by: The Viscount Townshend
- Succeeded by: The Earl of Sunderland

First Lord of the Treasury
- In office 12 April 1717 – 21 March 1718
- Monarch: George I
- Preceded by: Robert Walpole
- Succeeded by: The Earl of Sunderland

Chancellor of the Exchequer
- In office 15 April 1717 – 20 March 1718
- Monarch: George I
- Preceded by: Robert Walpole
- Succeeded by: John Aislabie

Secretary of State for the Southern Department
- In office 27 September 1714 – 22 June 1716
- Monarch: George I
- Preceded by: The Viscount Bolingbroke
- Succeeded by: Paul Methuen

Governor of Minorca
- In office 1708–1711
- Monarch: Anne
- Preceded by: Joan Miquel Saura Morell (Spanish rule)
- Succeeded by: The Duke of Argyll

Personal details
- Born: 1673 Paris, France
- Died: February 5, 1721 (aged 47–48) London, England
- Party: Whig
- Spouse: Lucy Pitt (1692–1723)
- Children: 7
- Parent(s): Alexander Stanhope; Katherine Burghill
- Education: Trinity College, Oxford; Eton College

James Stanhope, 1st Earl Stanhope, PC (1673 – 5 February 1721) was a British army officer and Whig politician who effectively served as Chief Minister between 1717 and 1721. He was also the last Chancellor of the Exchequer to sit in the House of Lords. Born in Paris as the son of a prominent diplomat, Stanhope pursued a military career. Although he also served in Flanders and Italy, he is best remembered for his service in Portugal and Spain during the War of the Spanish Succession. He was the first British Governor of Minorca, which he captured from the Spanish in 1708.

In 1710 he commanded the British contingent of the Allied Army which occupied Madrid, having won a decisive victory at the Battle of Zaragoza. Having then evacuated the Spanish capital, Stanhope's rearguard on the retreat to Barcelona were overwhelmed and forced to surrender at Brihuega. Paroled, he returned to Britain and pursued a political career as a Whig. A supporter of the Hanoverian Succession he was rewarded with office by George I in 1714. As Southern Secretary he oversaw the negotiation of an Anglo-French Alliance.

Emerging as the dominant figure in government after 1717, following the Whig Split, he led Britain to success in a new Spanish War and suppressed a Jacobite Rising in 1719. However, the government was overtaken by the collapse of the South Sea Bubble and he died in office. He is occasionally mentioned as an alternative candidate to Robert Walpole as Britain's first Prime Minister.

== Background and education ==
Stanhope was born in Paris in 1673, the eldest of the seven children of Alexander Stanhope (1638–1707), and his wife Katherine (died 1718), the daughter and co-heir of Arnold Burghill, of Thinghall Parva, Withington, Herefordshire, by his second wife Grizell, co-heir of John Prise of Ocle Pyrchard, Herefordshire. He was educated at Eton College and at Trinity College, Oxford, where he matriculated in May 1688.

Stanhope accompanied his father, then English Ambassador to Madrid, to Spain in 1690, and obtained some knowledge of that country which was very useful to him in later life.

A little later he went to Italy where, as afterwards in Flanders, he served as a volunteer against France, and in 1695 he secured a commission in the English army. In 1701 Stanhope entered the House of Commons, but he continued his career as a soldier and was in Spain and Portugal during the earlier stages of the War of the Spanish Succession.

== Spanish campaigns ==
=== Cádiz ===
During the opening stages of the war he was in Ireland on recruiting duty. He desperately sought a chance of combat, and was given permission to accompany the Duke of Ormonde's expedition to Cádiz. The attempt to capture Cádiz failed, but the expedition enjoyed success on the return journey at the Battle of Vigo Bay.

=== Portugal ===
In 1703 he served with the Duke of Marlborough's Army in the Low Countries, having arrived too late to take part in the Siege of Bonn. His regiment was then transferred to Lisbon. Due to Portugal's entry into the war on the Allied side, a large British continent was sent to assist them. While Stanhope was in Lisbon recovering from an attack of fever his regiment was part of a Portuguese-commanded garrison which surrendered the town of Portalegre.

=== Barcelona ===
In 1705 he served in Spain under Charles Mordaunt, Earl of Peterborough, notably at the Siege of Barcelona and in 1706 he was appointed English minister in Spain, but his duties were still military as well as diplomatic, and in 1708, after some differences with Peterborough, who favoured defensive measures only, he was made commander-in-chief of the British forces in that country.

=== Minorca ===
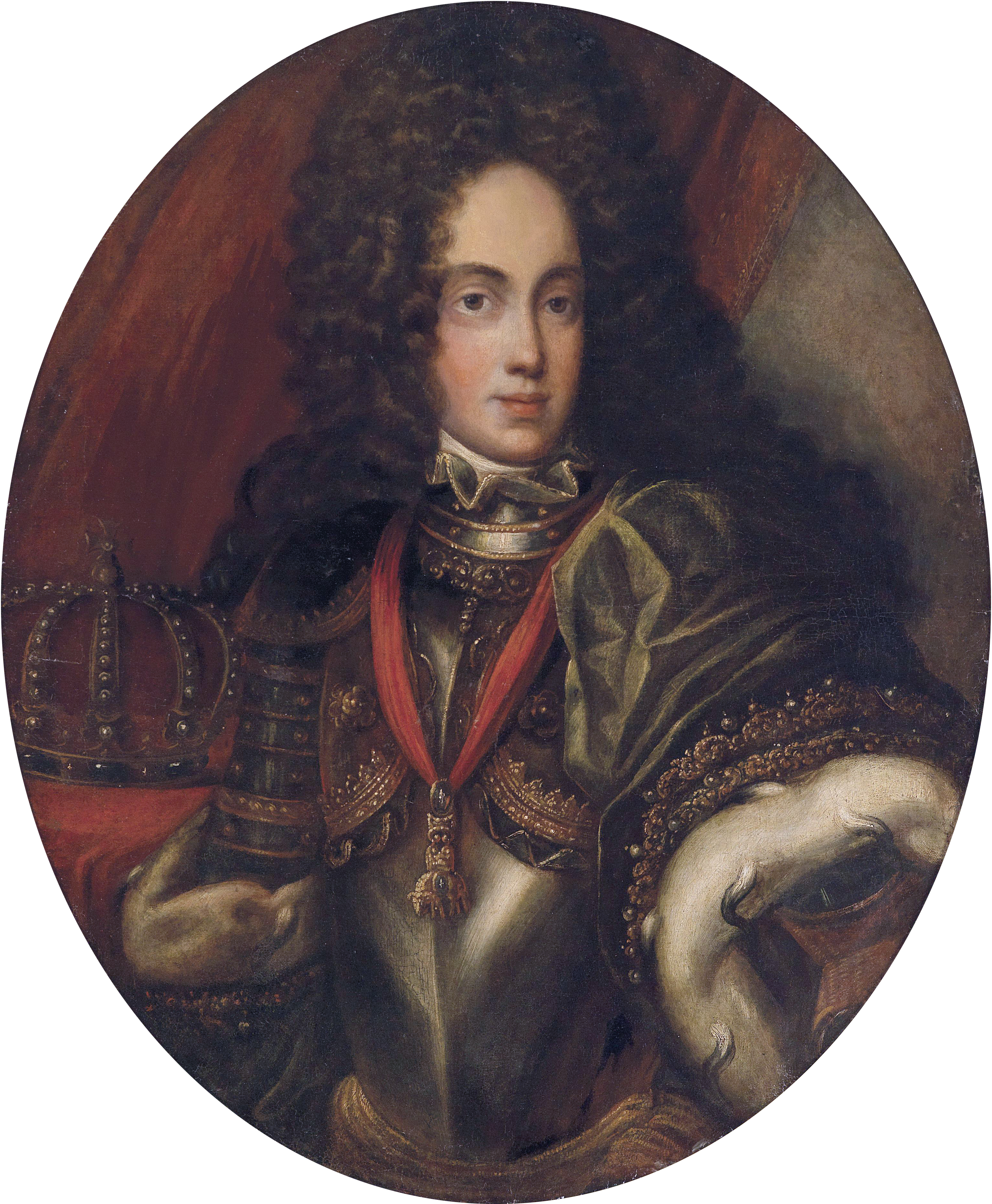
Stanhope fought to put the Allied candidate Archduke Charles of Austria on the Spanish throne

Taking the offensive he captured Port Mahon, Minorca. During the operation his younger brother Philip Stanhope, a naval officer, was killed.

=== Madrid campaign ===
After a visit to England in which he took part in the impeachment of Henry Sacheverell, he returned to Spain for the campaign of 1710, with Allied victories at Almenar and Saragossa in July and August enabling Archduke Charles to enter Madrid in September. On the back of these triumphs, Stanhope was selected as the Whig candidate for the Westminster seat in the 1710 General Election, with his cousin Lt-General Sherington Davenport as proxy in his absence.

=== Defeat ===
Unlike many constituencies, Westminster had a relatively large electorate of over 10,000 and its proximity to both Court and Parliament meant the result often influenced others. Almenar was used to promote 'brave, virtuous Stanhope' but his Tory opponent Thomas Crosse easily won the seat aided by the satirist Jonathan Swift who published thinly disguised accusations of Stanhope's homosexuality. The Tories won the General election in December by a landslide, by which time Stanhope was a prisoner in Spain but this theme was to form an important part of his future image.

Lack of support from the local population meant the Allies entered an almost deserted Madrid and were effectively isolated when Portuguese forces were prevented from crossing into Spain. In November, the Allies left Madrid for Catalonia in separate detachments, one of 5,000 under Stanhope and the second of 12,000 under the Austrian Starhemberg. Stanhope's division was taken by surprise and forced to surrender by a French army led by Louis Joseph, Duke of Vendôme at Brihuega on 9 December 1710. The next day Vendôme followed this up by defeating Starhemberg at Villaviciosa; these defeats were a devastating setback to Allied ambitions in Spain. Although Allied forces continued to operate out of Catalonia, British commitment to the war was already waning under the new Tory government and Stanhope's replacement as British commander in Spain the Duke of Argyll took no offensive action.

Of great significance was the death of Emperor Joseph I in April 1711 which meant Archduke Charles became Emperor Charles VI. This caused Britain to withdraw from the war since a Spanish and Austrian union threatened the European balance of power, and was as unwelcome as a French one. Philip V retained the Spanish throne, although lost many of Spain's traditional territories. Later Stanhope would admit to Queen Anne that he believed that the Spanish campaign was flawed in its general strategy, and even with more troops deployed there would struggle given the general preference of the Spanish population for Philip over Charles.

Most of the prisoners taken at Brihuega were quickly exchanged but Stanhope himself remained a prisoner in Spain and only returned to England in August 1712, coming via Paris where he encountered the Tory politician Henry St. John who was there negotiating a peace treaty with France.

== Political career, 1712–1721 ==
Once back in Britain he now abandoned his military career and moved wholly into politics. He soon sat for another seat, Wendover, and became one of the leaders of the Whig opposition in the House of Commons to Robert Harley's Tory administration. In particular he opposed the terms of the Treaty of Utrecht by which Britain unilaterally made peace with France and abandoned its allies, and he helped lead opposition to the French Commerce Bill of 1713. He was a staunch supporter of the House of Hanover. Once George I succeeded to the throne following the death of Queen Anne in 1714, he replaced the Tory government with a largely Whig one. Several senior Tories were either imprisoned or fled into exile due to their perceived support of the Jacobite James Stuart.

=== Secretary of State ===
In September 1714 he was appointed Secretary of State for the Southern Department. With Walpole he provided the leadership of the House of Commons. In early 1715 the new government's position was secured when it won a decisive election victory.

He was mainly responsible for the measures which were instrumental in crushing the Jacobite rising of 1715. He forwarded the passing of the Septennial Act in 1716 that established that general elections should be held every seven years. In July 1716 he accompanied George I on his return to Hanover.

He acted as George I's foreign minister, and only just failed to conclude a treaty of alliance with France in 1716. In 1717 there was a dramatic schism in the Whig Party with Stanhope and Sunderland forming one grouping while Walpole and Townshend opposed them. Walpole led his supporters into opposition, coinciding with a similar dispute within the royal family between George I and his son George, Prince of Wales. This Whig Split divided the dominant Whig movement for three years.

=== Emergence as First Minister ===
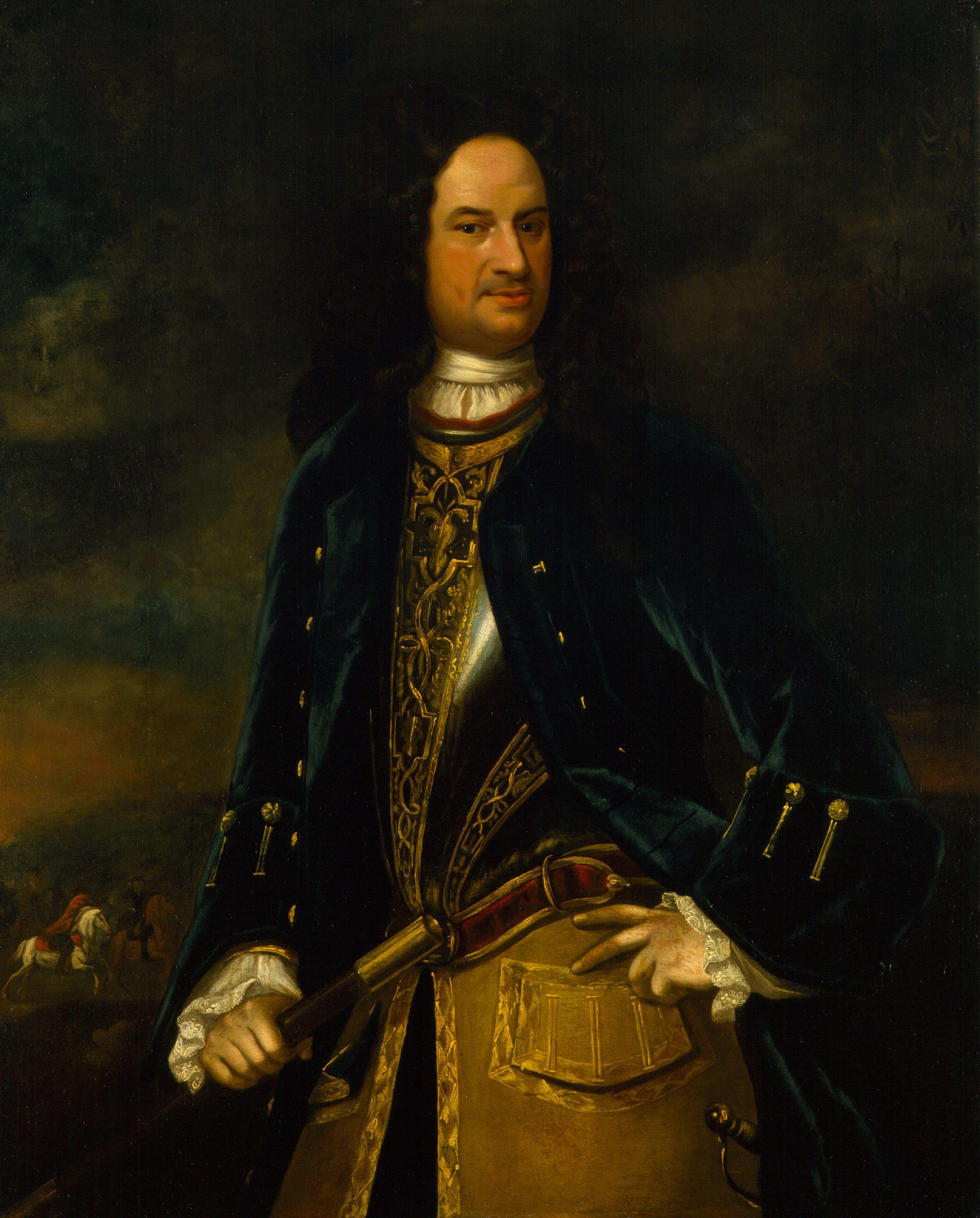
1718 portrait by Johan van Diest.

In 1717, consequent on changes in the ministry, Stanhope was made First Lord of the Treasury, and was the last Chancellor of the Exchequer to sit in the House of Lords. A year later he returned to his former office of secretary for the southern department. On 3 July 1717, he was created Baron Stanhope of Elvaston and Viscount Stanhope of Mahon and, on 14 April 1718, Earl Stanhope. He was in all but name Prime Minister and is sometimes presented as the first Prime Minister of Great Britain, rather than Sir Robert Walpole who is more usually considered as that figure.

Domestically his government suffered a defeat when the Impeachment of Robert Harley, former first minister, ended in his acquittal in July 1717.

=== War of the Quadruple Alliance ===
He saw Britain's principal foreign policy goals as containing the threat of Spanish, Austrian or Russian expansionist tendencies. His activity was now shown in the conclusion of the Quadruple Alliance between Britain, France, Austria and the United Provinces in 1718, and in obtaining peace for Sweden, when threatened by Russia and Denmark. He entered delicate negotiations with Spain which wished for the return of Gibraltar, which he was only prepared to do in exchange for Cuba and Florida. Ultimately the talks broke down, setting the path to the later Thirteenth Siege of Gibraltar.

In the ensuing War of the Quadruple Alliance British forces were involved in a campaign to prevent Spanish expansion in Italy. Spain landed troops in Scotland in support of the Jacobites who they hoped to restore to the throne. The expedition was defeated at the Battle of Glen Shiel and in retaliation the British dispatched a force that briefly captured Vigo in October 1719. In the wake of these setbacks Spain agreed to the Treaty of The Hague the following year.

Domestically, he promoted the Peerage Bill of 1719 to limit the membership of the House of Lords a controversial move as it was seen as an attack directed at his former Whig colleagues led by Walpole. His attempts at pushing for greater religious toleration were defeated by Walpole's supporters.

=== South Sea Bubble ===
Just after the collapse of the South Sea Bubble, for which he was partly responsible but from which he did not profit, the earl was defending his government with customary vigour and panache in House of Lords on 4 February 1721 when he was taken ill with a violent headache. After some apparent recovery the following day, he died of a stroke at eight o'clock that evening. The king was shocked and distraught at the sudden "loss of so able and faithful a minister, of whose service his Majesty had so great need at this critical juncture". On the king's orders Stanhope was given a full military funeral through London on 17 February to Southwark, and he was afterwards privately buried at Chevening. He was succeeded by his eldest son Philip (1714–1786), a distinguished mathematician and a fellow of the Royal Society.

== Reputation ==
Basil Williams said Stanhope, "had no special bent for domestic politics.... His impetuosity and want of experience indeed led him into mistakes sometimes in dealing with internal questions." However, Williams goes on to argue that:

On the other hand, in foreign politics his comprehensive grasp of European conditions and of England's essential interests, his tact and self-control in dealings with foreign allies or opponents, and the blunt honesty of his diplomacy gave him an ascendancy rarely equaled by any of our foreign ministers. This ascendancy was the more remarkable since it had peace alone as its object and its result. The long epoch of comparative security in external relations which enabled Walpole quietly to consolidate the country's internal prosperity on a sound basis was mainly due to Stanhope's achievement in foreign policy.

== Family ==
On 24 February 1713, Stanhope married Lucy Pitt (1692–1723), a younger daughter of Thomas Pitt, the first governor of Madras, and aunt to William Pitt the Elder. Although Stanhope found little time for domesticity, it was a happy union, and the couple had seven children, including two sets of twins:

- Philip Stanhope, 2nd Earl Stanhope (1714–1786)
- Lady Lucy Stanhope (1714–1785)
- Lt-Col Hon. George Stanhope (1717–1754)
- Lady Gertrude Stanhope (born 1718, died young)
- Lady Jane Stanhope (born 1719)
- Hon. James Stanhope (1721–1730)
- Lady Catherine Stanhope (born 1721, died young)

His sister Mary, one of Queen Anne's six Maids of Honour, 1702–1707, married Charles, 1st Viscount Fane in 1707.

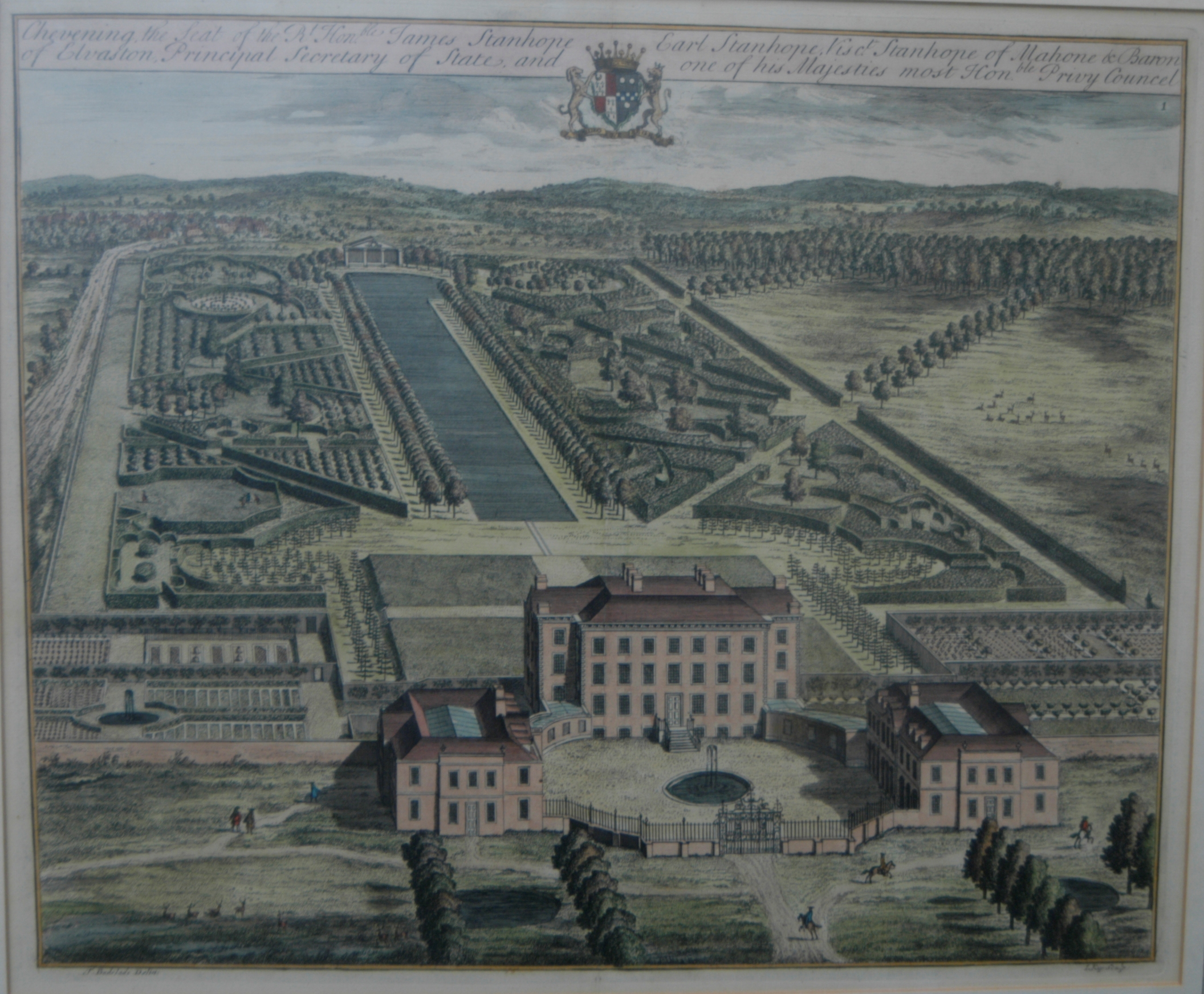
Chevening, the Seat of the Rt. Honble. James Stanhope Earl Stanhope, Visct Stanhope of Mahone & Baron of Elvaston, Principal Secretary of State, and one of his Majesties most Honble. Privy Councel. An engraving of Stanhope's Chevening by Jan Kip (Amsterdam 1652/53–1722) after Thomas Badeslade (died 1742), published by John Harris in his History of Kent, London, 1719.

== See also ==
- Kingdom of Great Britain

== Notes ==
Parliament of England
Preceded by The Lord Cutts of Gowran; Edward Richards	Member of Parliament for Newport (Isle of Wight); 1702; With: Edward Richards	Succeeded by The Lord Cutts of Gowran; William Stephens
Preceded by William Seymour; Thomas Lamplugh	Member of Parliament for Cockermouth; 1702 – 1707; With: Thomas Lamplugh	Succeeded by Parliament of Great Britain
Parliament of Great Britain
Preceded by Parliament of England	Member of Parliament for Cockermouth; 1707–1713; With: Thomas Lamplugh 1707–1708; Albemarle Bertie 1708–1710; Nicholas Lechmere 1710–1713	Succeeded by Nicholas Lechmere; Joseph Musgrave
Preceded by Sir Roger Hill; Richard Hampden	Member of Parliament for Wendover; 1714 – 1715; With: Sir Roger Hill	Succeeded by Sir Roger Hill; Richard Grenville
Preceded by Nicholas Lechmere; Joseph Musgrave	Member of Parliament for Cockermouth; 1715–1717; With: Nicholas Lechmere	Succeeded by Nicholas Lechmere; Thomas Pengelly
Preceded by John Dawnay; Paul Foley	Member of Parliament for Aldborough; 1715; With: William Jessop	Succeeded by William Jessop; William Monson
Preceded by William Stephens; Anthony Morgan	Member of Parliament for Newport (Isle of Wight); 1717; With: William Stephens	Succeeded by William Stephens; Sir Tristram Dillington, Bt
Political offices
Preceded by —	Governor of Minorca; 1708–1711	Succeeded by The Duke of Argyll
Preceded by The Viscount Bolingbroke	Secretary of State for the Southern Department; 1714–1716	Succeeded by Paul Methuen
Preceded by The Viscount Townshend	Secretary of State for the Northern Department; 1716–1717	Succeeded by The Earl of Sunderland
Preceded by Robert Walpole	First Lord of the Treasury; 1717–1718	Succeeded by The Earl of Sunderland
Preceded by Robert Walpole	Chancellor of the Exchequer; 1717–1718	Succeeded by John Aislabie
Preceded by The Earl of Sunderland	Secretary of State for the Northern Department; 1718–1721	Succeeded by The Viscount Townshend
Military offices
Preceded by Sir John Hanmer	Colonel of James Stanhope's Regiment of Foot; 1702–1705	Succeeded by John Hill
Preceded by Frans van Nassau	Colonel of James Stanhope's Regiment of Dragoons; 1710–1712	Regiment disbanded
New regiment	Colonel of James Stanhope's Regiment of Dragoons; 1715–1718	Regiment disbanded
Peerage of Great Britain
New creation	Earl Stanhope; 1718–1721	Succeeded by Philip Stanhope
New creation	Viscount Stanhope; 1717–1721	Succeeded by Philip Stanhope
