= Battle of Almenar =

1710 battle

- Part of the War of the Spanish Succession
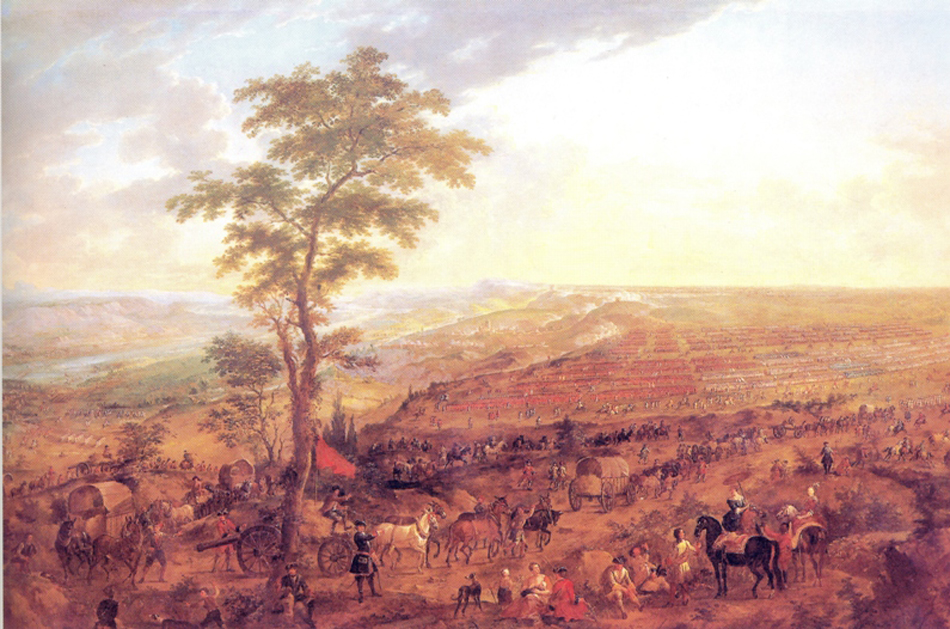
Date	27 July 1710
Location	hills of Almenar, near Balaguer (Catalonia), Spain
Result	Grand Alliance victory

Belligerents
Bourbon Spain	Habsburg Austria; Kingdom of Portugal; Great Britain; Dutch Republic

Commanders and leaders
(Spain) Villadarias	(Habsburg monarchy) Starhemberg (Kingdom of Great Britain) Stanhope

Strength
22,000	24,000

Casualties and losses
1,300 dead or wounded 3,000 captured	400 dead or wounded

The Battle of Almenar took place near Balaguer in Catalonia, on 27 July 1710, during the War of the Spanish Succession.

In June 1710, the Bourbon-Spanish army of Phillip V crossed into Catalonia in an attempt to capture Balaguer; an Allied force of British, Portuguese, Dutch and Austrian troops supporting Archduke Charles countered these moves and the two armies met in battle just to the north of Lleida on the afternoon of 27 July. Philip's army was defeated and forced to withdraw behind the Ebro but remained intact.

== Prelude ==
1710 Campaign in Spain; key locations

By the spring of 1709, France was financially exhausted, the severe winter of 1708/09 led to widespread famine and Louis XIV was forced to withdraw French troops from Spain to reinforce his northern frontier. However, although the Battle of Malplaquet in September 1709 was technically an Allied victory, the casualties shocked Europe and halted their advance into France. In Spain, forces loyal to the Bourbon candidate Philip V recaptured Alicante in April 1709 and won a resounding victory over an Anglo-Portuguese army at La Gudiña in May. The Portuguese now declared an informal truce, allowing trade and agriculture to recommence.

All sides wanted peace but negotiations in The Hague over the winter and spring of 1709/10 failed when the Allies demanded Louis agree to remove his grandson Philip by force if necessary. This approach was summarised by the British Whig party slogan No Peace Without Spain but was a major miscalculation. There was growing opposition to the war in Britain, now the major financial backer of the Alliance while the campaign in Spain had largely been a failure. Phillip was far more popular with the Spanish than his rival Archduke Charles and so the war continued.

In May 1710, Phillip and the Spanish-Bourbon army under Francisco Castillo Fajardo, 2nd Marquis of Villadarias crossed the Segre river into Catalonia hoping to capture Balaguer. The first attempt failed due to torrential rain but French reinforcements increased the Spanish army to 20,000 infantry and 6,000 cavalry and in June they tried again. The illness of the Allied commander Guido Starhemberg enabled Philip to capture a number of small towns but after several weeks of marching and counter-marching, on 27 July Stanhope's division crossed the Segres at Alfarràs and combined with Starhemberg's forces on the heights of Almenar.

== Battle ==
Villadarias opened the battle with a cavalry attack on the Allied defences which initially gave way. The Spanish wasted the opening by pursuing groups of fleeing enemies and allowed the Allied lines to reform.

British, Dutch and German cavalry on the Allied left led by Stanhope and George Carpenter attacked the Bourbon army's right wing which fled, taking the second line with it; British casualties included the Earl of Rochford, Colonel of the 3rd Dragoon Regiment who was killed as they broke the Spanish lines. The Allies simultaneously attacked the Bourbon right wing and put them to flight, with Philip himself only just avoiding capture.

The battle took place late in the afternoon, preventing the Allies from following up their victory and allowing the Bourbon forces to gather their scattered cavalry and reassemble in the town of Zaragoza or Saragossa.

== Aftermath ==
Shortly after this, Villadarias was replaced by the French general the Marquis de Bay, victor over an Anglo-Portuguese army at the Battle of La Gudina in May 1709. The Bourbon army was battered but largely intact.

== Sources ==
- Falkner, James (2015). The War of the Spanish Succession 1701-1714. Pen and Sword Military. ISBN 978-1781590317.
- Lynn, John (1999). The Wars of Louis XIV, 1667-1714. Longman. ISBN 0582056292.
- Saint Simon, Louis, duc de (1902). Memoirs of Louis XIV and His Court and of the Regency — Volume 07 (2016 ed.). CreateSpace Independent Publishing Platform. p. Chapter 14. ISBN 1523296240.
- Van Nimwegen, Olaf (2020). De Veertigjarige Oorlog 1672-1712: de strijd van de Nederlanders tegen de Zonnekoning (The 40 Years War 1672-1712: the Dutch struggle against the Sun King) (in Dutch). Prometheus. ISBN 978-90-446-3871-4.;
