= Battle of the Malacca Strait (1714) =

1714 naval battle

Battle of the Strait of Malacca (1714)
- Part of War of the Spanish Succession
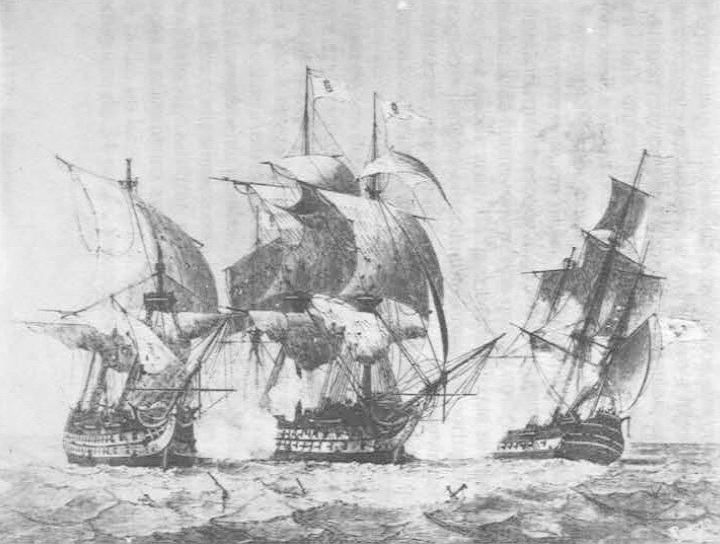
| Date | January 8, 1714 – January 10, 1714 |
| Location | Strait of Malacca |
| Result | Portuguese victory |

Belligerents
| Portugal | France |

Commanders and leaders
| Paulo da Costa | Henri Bouynot |

Strength
| 1 frigate 176 crewmen 34 cannons | 2 frigates 500 crewmen 90 cannons |

Casualties and losses
| 3 dead and 8 injured | 80 dead and numerous injured |

The Battle of the Malacca Strait was one of the last battles of the War of the Spanish Succession, fought between 8 and 10 of January in 1714, in violation of the Peace of Utrecht signed between France and Portugal in April 1713.

== See also ==
- War of the Spanish Succession
  - Portugal in the War of Spanish Succession
- Kingdom of Portugal
- Kingdom of France
