= Siege of Ciudad Rodrigo (1707) =

Coordinates: 40.5969°N 6.5225°W

- Part of War of the Spanish Succession
Date	18 September 1707 – 4 October 1707 (2 weeks and 2 days)
Location	Ciudad Rodrigo, Crown of Castile, Spain
Result	Franco-Spanish victory

Belligerents
Pro-Bourbon Spain; France	Great Britain; Portugal

Commanders and leaders
(Spain) (Kingdom of France) Marquis de Bay	Unknown

Strength
9,500	3,000 1,400 regulars 1,600 militia

Casualties and losses
Unknown	3,000 300 killed 600 wounded 2,100 captured

The siege of Ciudad Rodrigo was a successful siege of the Spanish city of Ciudad Rodrigo, between 18 September and 4 October 1707, in which a Franco-Spanish army under command of Alexandre Maître, Marquis de Bay conquered the city.

Ciudad Rodrigo had been besieged and taken on 25 May 1706 by 40.000 Portuguese, Dutch and English soldiers under command of Henri de Massue, Earl of Galway and António Luís de Sousa, 2nd Marquis of Minas.

On 18 September 1707, a Franco-Spanish army under command of Alexandre Maître, Marquis de Bay arrived at the city and laid siege. The siege lasted until 4 October when the walls were breached and the city was stormed and forced to capitulate.
Some 2,100 prisoners were taken. A total of 300 soldiers were killed and some 600 wounded.
