= Portugal in the War of Spanish Succession =

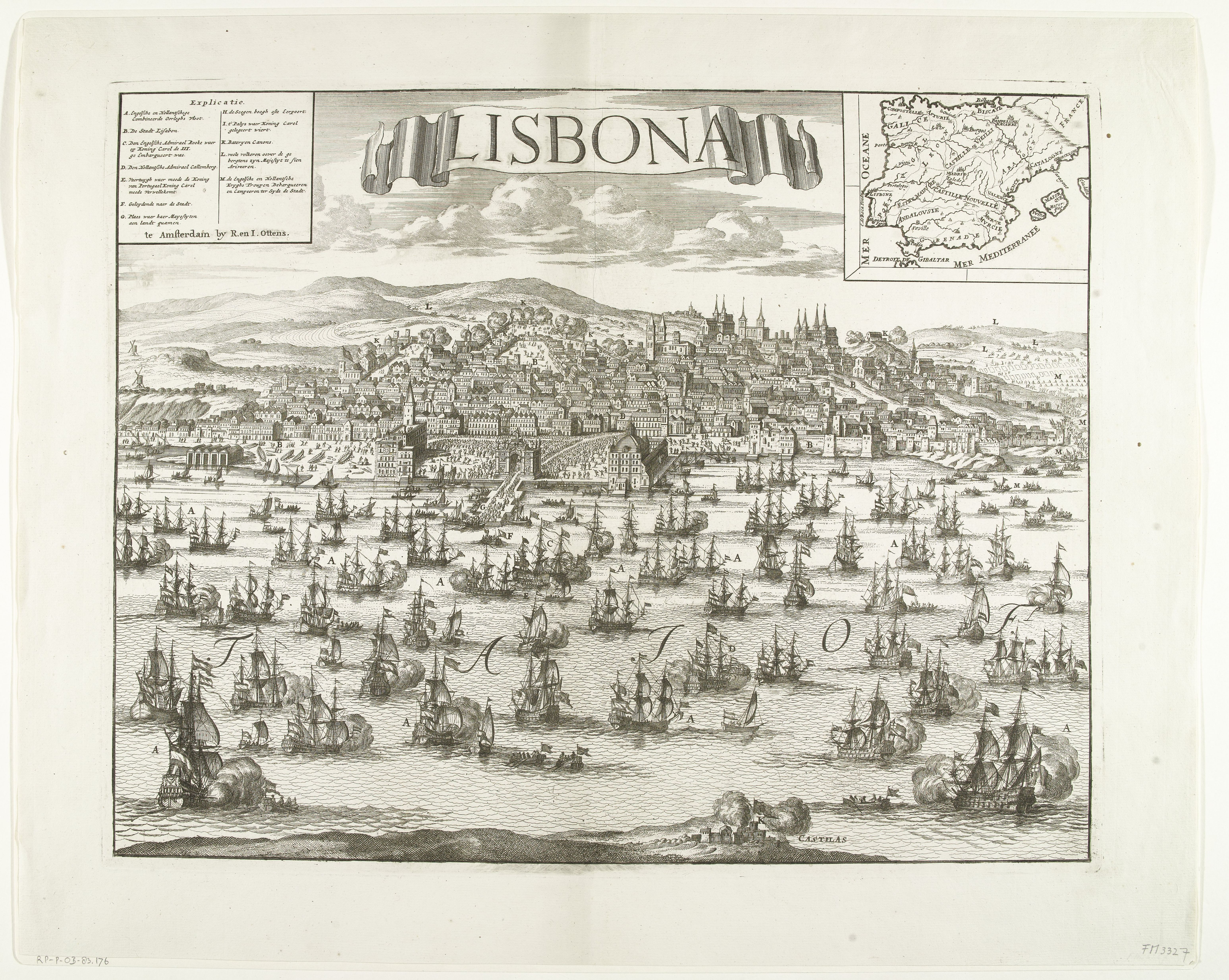
Landing of Archduke Charles at Lisbon.

Portugal took part in the War of the Spanish Succession between 1704 and 1712, triggered by the death of Spanish King Charles II without direct heirs. This caused a dispute between rival claimants to the throne, namely Philip V, supported by France, and Archduke Charles Habsburg, supported by England, the Dutch Republic and the Holy Roman Empire. Portugal joined the war on the side of the Grand Alliance and emerged from the conflict in a reinforced position in the Americas but fundamentally with closer ties to Britain.

Portuguese participation came about just 36 years after the War of Portuguese Restoration of Independence, because king Peter II wished to increase the diplomatic standing of the Braganza dynasty and secure the borders of Brazil, as well as those of Portugal in Europe. Portugal initially aligned with France and Spain, but joined the Grand Alliance once it became clear that France lacked the ability to challenge the allies at sea and Phillip V harboured the ambition to re-annex the country.

After a poor start marked by the loss of Colónia do Sacramento in South-America along with the invasion of Portugal by Spanish army, a joint Portuguese, English and Dutch force recaptured the occupied territory and marched into Spain. The energetic Marquis of Minas António Luís de Sousa led an allied army in a bold campaign that reached Madrid and had Archduke Charles acclaimed as King of Spain in the city, which resonated throughout Europe at the time. Nevertheless, the balance of power swung back in Bourbon favor after the Battle of Almansa and Portugal spent the last five years on the defensive, engaged in border skirmishes and fighting French privateers overseas.

== Background ==
Towards the end of the 17th century, Spain was in decline and King Charles II had no direct heirs, which led the European powers to anticipate a conflict over the Spanish throne. Portugal embarked on intense diplomatic activity with various powers and negotiated contingencies in the event of a new military confrontation.

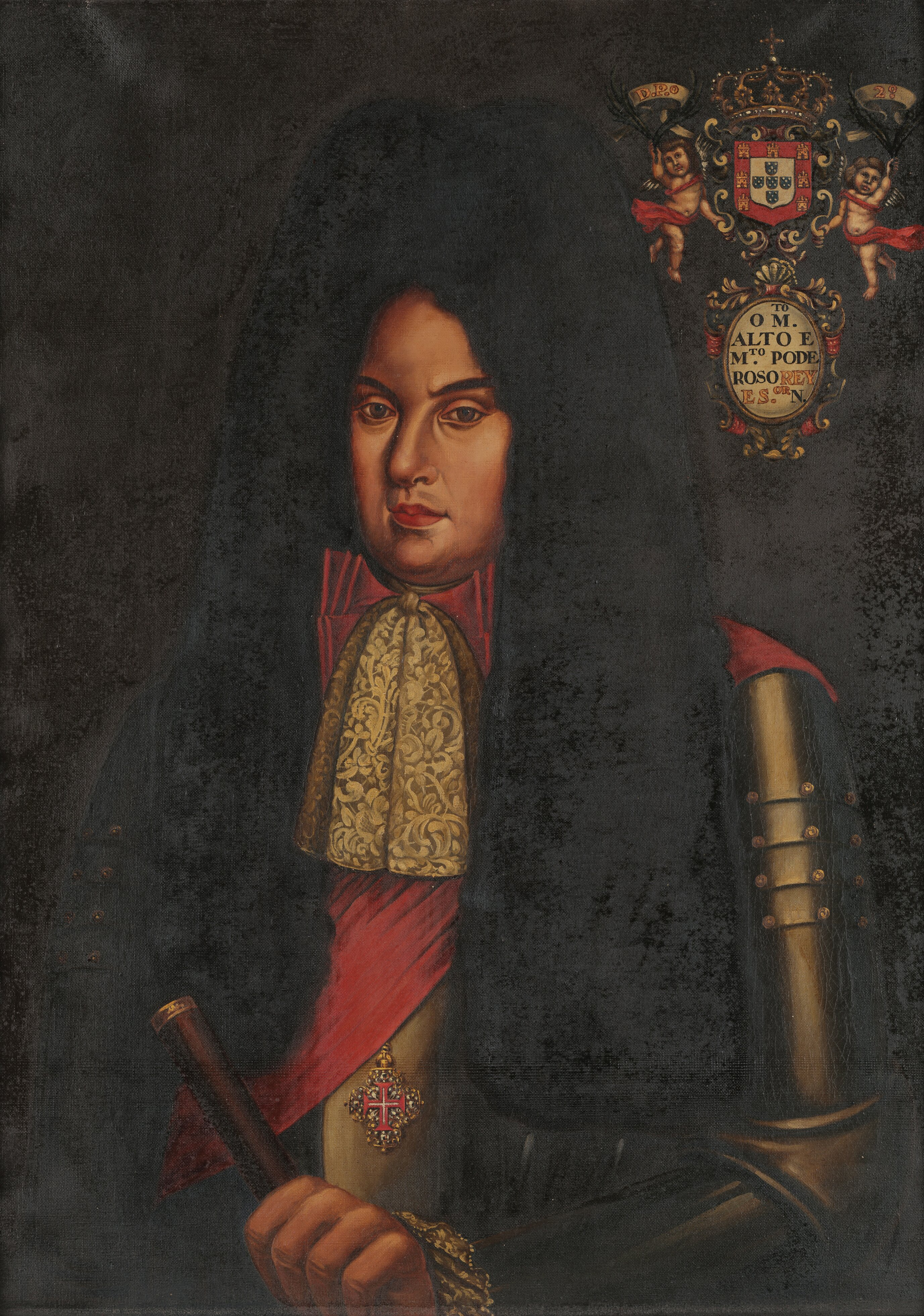
King Peter II of Portugal.

Charles II died in 1700 and in his will named Duke Phillip of Anjou as his successor, who thus ascended the throne as Philip V of Spain. King Peter II of Portugal wished to secure the border of Brazil by expanding it to the River Plate, which was a much clearer and safer boundary with Spanish America, and acquire the Spanish towns of Tui, Vigo, Baiona, A Guarda, Badajoz, Albuquerque and Valencia de Alcántara to strengthen Portugal's defences in Europe. As England did not support this expansionist project and the main Portuguese diplomat, the Duke of Cadaval, was pro-French, the Portuguese king recognised Philip V against the opinion of his advisers and Portugal initially aligned with France.

The succession of Philip V was not accepted by Emperor Leopold, who considered that the Spanish throne belonged to his son, Archduke Charles of Habsburg. He was also backed by England and the Netherlands, which were later joined by other powers. The war between France and the allied powers began throughout Europe and the Mediterranean in 1701.

French defeats the following year and the fact that France failed to produce a fleet that would help Portugal defend its colonies and shipping routes as per the agreement led king Peter to reconsider his position. He did not wish to antagonize Britain and the Netherlands, and furthermore Philip V insisted on addressing King Pedro II insultingly as Duke of Bragança only, which exposed his intentions to reannex Portugal into Spain. All this led Portugal to abandon the pro-Bourbon bloc in September 1702.

A brief period of Portuguese neutrality followed. To avoid clashes in Portuguese waters between hostile navies coming in or out of Portuguese ports, the king ordered port authorities not to allow ships from rival powers to leave with less than two tides between them.

=== Portugal joins the Grand Alliance ===
In May 1703, Portugal joined the Grand Alliance by the signing of two treaties with England, the Netherlands and the Holy Roman Empire. King Peter II pledged to enter the war with 12,000 foot-soldiers and 3,000 cavalrymen. In return, the allies would support Portugal with 12,000 soldiers and also pay for the recruitment of 13,000 more, in annual instalments of one million patacas. A secret treaty was also signed with Archduke Charles, which provided for the surrender of the border towns of Tui, Vigo, Baiona, A Guarda, Badajoz, Albuquerque and Valencia de Alcántara in Spain and all the lands north of the River Plate, which would serve as the border between the two Crowns in South America. A proposal for the marriage of the Portuguese heir to an Austrian princess and Archduke Charles to a Portuguese princess sealed Portugals entry to the Grand Alliance.

Portugal began mobilizing for war immediately, and several generals were appointed to the borders: the Count of Galveias, Dinis de Melo e Castro, to Alentejo; the Marquis of Minas, António Luís de Sousa, to Beira; the Count of Alvor Francisco de Távora, to Trás-os-Montes; the Count of Atalaia, Luís Manuel de Távora, to Minho; and the Count of Alvito to the Algarve. The defences at the mouth of the Tagus were reinforced, the navy was put on alert and warnings and signals were tested on land. King Peter took out loans to finance the reconstruction of walls and the acquisition of military equipment, while asking the country's city halls to maintain a 4.5% contribution for the purchase of weapons and ammunition. Judge António Rodrigues da Costa was instructed to write up a "Justification" in Spanish and Latin of the reasons for Portugal's intervention in the conflict to be published abroad.

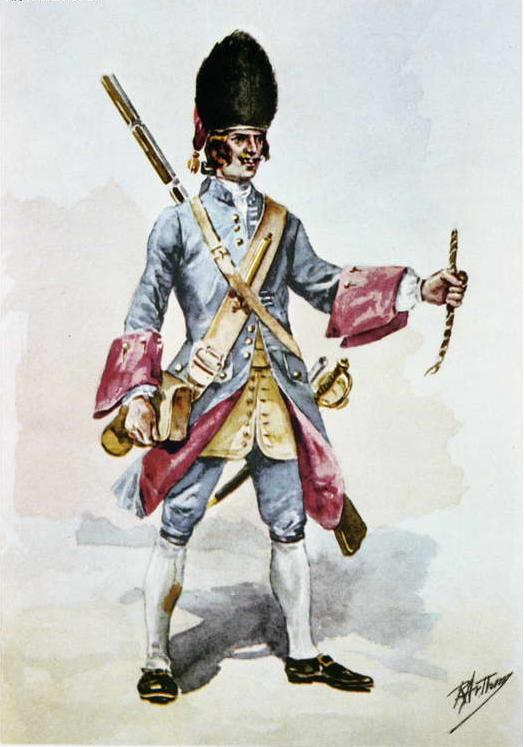
Portuguese grenadier.

On the eve of hostilities, Portuguese forces maintained the old terço organization. The Portuguese royal army numbered 15,000 footsoldiers divided in 22 terços and 3500 cavalrymen, plus a terço of marines and a terço maintained by the Junta do Comércio ("Board of Commerce"), each with 660 men. This did not include the territorial terços in each of the provinces, totalling about 14. Some changes were made to the armed forces on the eve of hostilities: any matchlock muskets or arquebuses still in use were phased out and replaced with flintlock firearms. The number of men in each terço was increased from 660 men to 800 and then 1000. By a royal decree dated 14 November 1702 every regular army terço was to have two companies of grenadiers. The number of men in cavalry companies was increased from 80 to 120, while the artillery corps was increased from 500 men to 1000.

The reasons for Portugal's involvement in the war were poorly understood by most of the population however, and few believed in the outbreak of hostilities. In August of that year, a fleet of 40 merchant ships called at Lisbon with a large cargo of cod, cheese, and butter, and loaded Portuguese products in a peaceful atmosphere.

On 7 March 1704, Archduke Charles landed at Lisbon accompanied by allied troops, as Portugal had insisted during negotiations. This event represented an unprecedented international recognition of the House of Braganza and was celebrated lavishly. The English troops were commanded by the Duke of Schomberg and the Dutch by François Nicolas Fagel.

== The Iberian theater ==
Spain declared war on Portugal on 30 April 1704.

On 7 May, the province of Beira was invaded by a 26,000 to 40,000-man army personally commanded by Philip V, who had veterans brought in from both Italy and the Netherlands, as well as a detachment of French troops commanded by the Duke of Berwick James FitzJames. Salvaterra do Extremo, Segura and Zebreira were occupied without a shot, while Monsanto and Idanha-a-Nova put up resistance and were taken by storm. The garrison of Monsanto was beheaded and the town looted for having offered some resistance. Atrocities were perpetrated against the rural population. On 20 May, the Spanish attacked Castelo Branco and four days later entered the city. Its occupation was presided by Philip V himself. Penamacor was then attacked, and at Sobreira Formosa a detachment of English troops en route to Almeida was annihilated by the Spanish. The Spanish also built a pontoon bridge at Vila Velha de Ródão on 30 May and crossed south into the Alentejo.

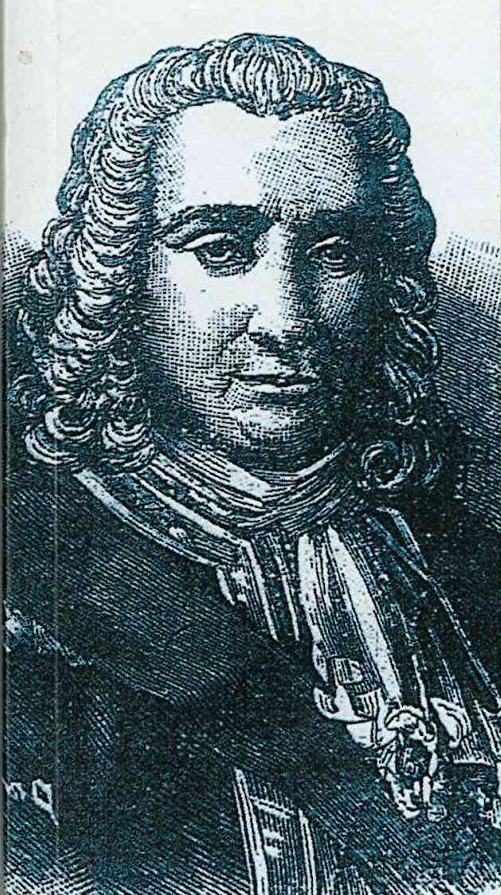
The Marquis of Minas António Luís de Sousa.

Franco-Spanish advance in Beira would be checked by the Marquis of Minas, who organized a counter-attack. He left Almeida on 2 June with a small division reinforced with troops from Minho and Trás-os-Montes and recaptured Monsanto between 9 and 11 June. From there, he entered Spain and occupied Fuenteguinaldo.

Beira was chosen by English and Portuguese generals as the best place to cross into Spain. King Pedro II and Archduke Charles met in Guarda and in September moved from there to Almeida, where most of the allied troops had been concentrated. Ciudad Rodrigo across the border was defended by Berwick with 8,000 men and it was attacked on 7 October, but the autumn rains had by that point begun and the Spanish had fortified the crossing of the Águeda River effectively. Seeing no way to cross the Águeda, the allied army returned to Portugal. Archduke Charles then left for Lisbon, and there he re-embarked for Catalonia.

After the departure of Archduke Charles from Portugal, a brief lull followed in western Iberia. The Spanish sieged Gibraltar, which had been captured by the English the previous year and in March 1705, a dispatch from the commander of Gibraltar Prince George of Hesse-Darmstadt reached Lisbon, requesting aid from Admiral Sir John Leake. Portugal participated in the allied relief expedition to Gibraltar with eight warships under the command of Gaspar da Costa de Ataíde. At the Battle of Cabrita Point on the morning of 20 March, the Anglo-Dutch-Portuguese fleet seized a smaller French squadron then leaving Gibraltar, apparently caught unaware of the size of their adversary due to the thick fog until it was too late.

Back in Portugal, the presence of foreign troops caused unrest in the country. Soares da Silva wrote that the movement of troops in Beira and Alentejo was a cause of ‘unrepentant, irredeemable and unpunished violence’. In early 1705, he stated that:

...The foreign militia has exercised the operation of its qualities, those being heresy and drunkenness, everywhere they go and wherever they stay, so that on the roads the travelers, and in the towns the residents live with great caution and no less danger, experiencing infinite damage and repeated destruction, stealing beasts, robbing houses, burning crops, violating respects and demeaning places.

The military situation in Portugal would nevertheless improve greatly in 1705 as a result of preparations made by the Marquis of Minas in Beira and the Count of Galveias in Alentejo. The Portuguese gathered their troops in Estremoz and Arronches, and entered Spain from there to attack to Valencia de Alcántara, which surrendered on 8 May after a week of siege. Albuquerque also surrendered quickly on the 19th of the same month. The attack on Badajoz however was canceled once the scorching summer heat set in. Meanwhile, Salvaterra do Extremo, Zebreira, Castelo Branco and Monsanto were recaptured by the troops of the Marquis of Minas, who then devastated the region of Zarza la Mayor in a great raid.

=== The march to Madrid ===
In 1705, Barcelona was captured by the allies and Archduke Charles crowned king of Spain in the city. The following year, pro-Bourbon forces began preparing to siege Barcelona, but this required the relocation to Catalonia of a great number of troops defending the border with Portugal, which was thus left weakened. Influenced by these events most Portuguese officers proposed the occupation of the border regions but the English favored a daring march to Madrid. The latter option was approved by the Marquis of Minas and king Peter. The allied command in Portugal thus decided on a march deep into Spain in a major offensive.

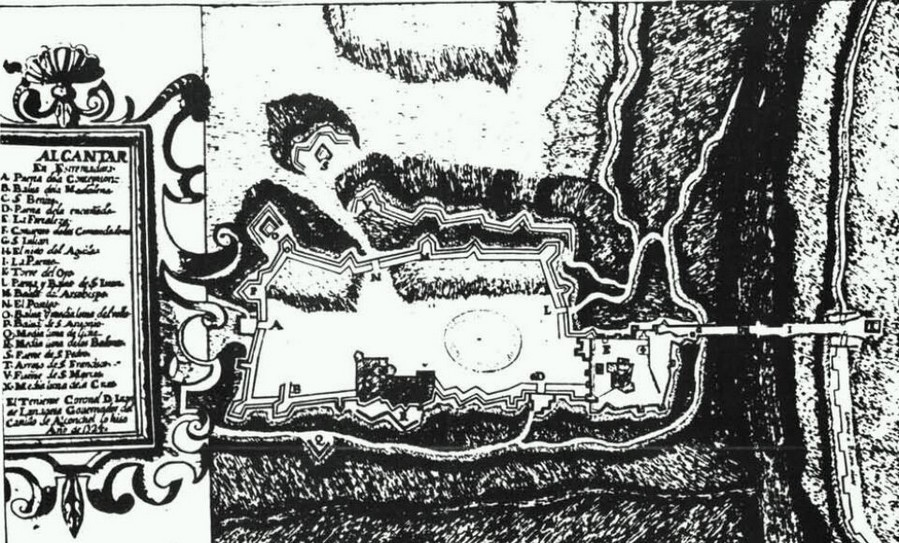
Alcántara and its defenses.

With the allies united under the command of the Marquis of Minas, around 14,000 Portuguese, 2,200 British and 2,000 Dutch crossed the border at Atalaia dos Sapateiros on 24 March and advanced rapidly northwards towards Alcántara, which was sieged on April 9. The siege of Alcántara resulted in significant casualties among the senior officers, but the Duke of Berwick withdrew with his troops and the city was occupied on April 14.

Heated discussion among the allied command regarding which steps to take next followed, which delayed the campaign, but when news of allied success in Catalonia arrived, the Marquis of Minas decided to advance with a daring march to Madrid.

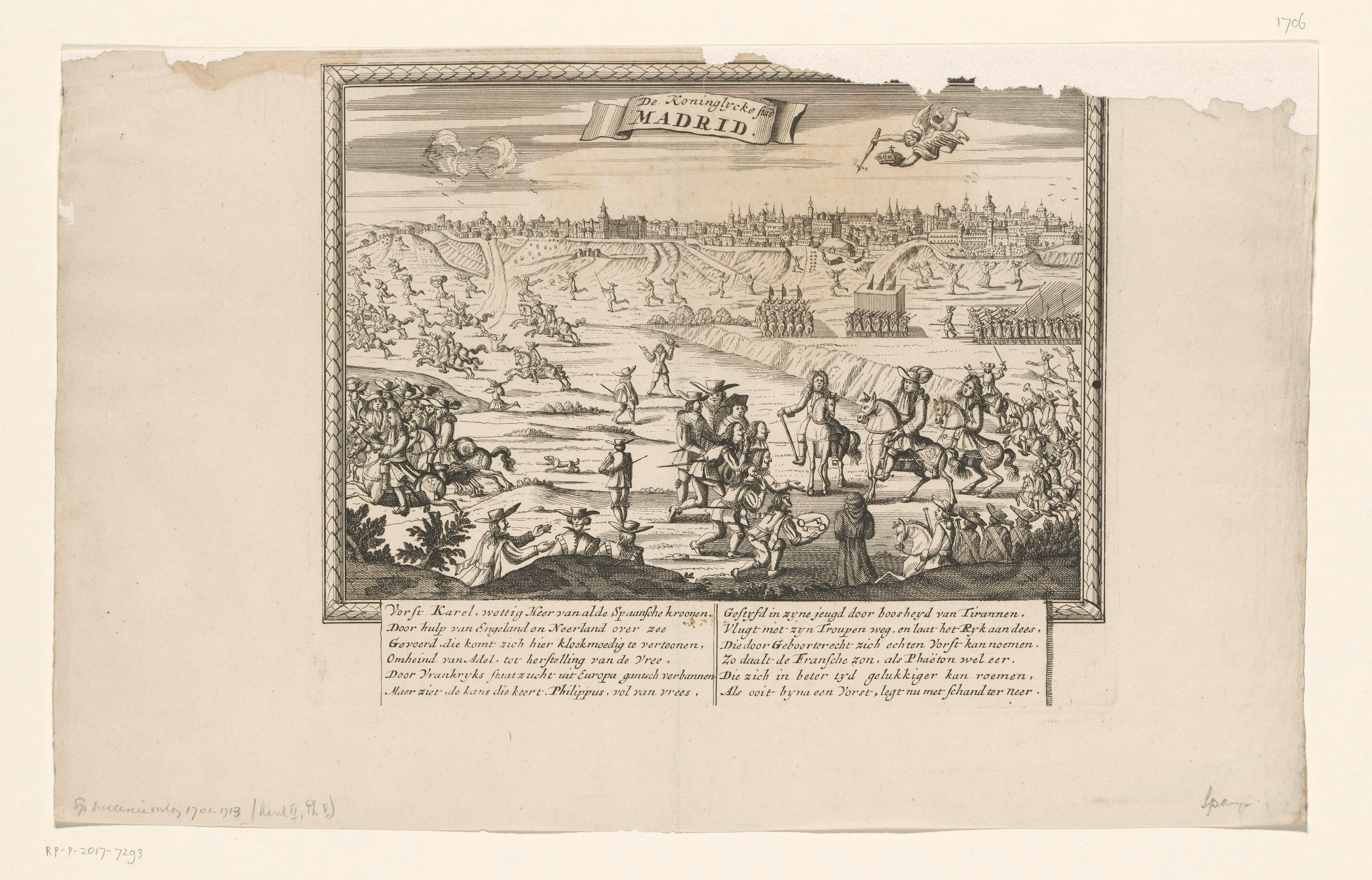
Phillip V leaves Madrid.

Ciudad Rodrigo was defended by 400 soldiers and 2,000 militiamen but it was taken on 26 May, while Salamanca fell on 6 June. The Marquis of Minas decided not to waste time occupying territory in order to prevent the Spanish from organizing their defenses at the Tagus and once he got news of allied successes in Catalonia, he began the march to Madrid on 12 June. Berwick kept retreating with the allies close behind, and even when Phillip V met him with reinforcements, a decision was made not to make a stand at the Guadarrama river but withdraw north to Burgos. After meeting virtually no resistance, on 25 June the allied army camped on Villacastin. The monks of El Escorial feared that the palace would be looted but the Marquis of Minas imposed strict discipline and this did not take place. On 24 of June at Retamar the Marquis of Minas received envoys and deputations of citizens of Madrid, Segovia, Ávila, Toledo and Talavera, offering to submit and requesting protection and the nomination of magistrates to run the cities.

The cavalry squadrons of the count of Vila Verde entered Madrid first on June 26. They were followed two days later by the Marquis of Minas, who entered the city in triumph with the bulk of the forces, just five days after Philip V had left. The opportunity to chase the Bourbon troops stationed in Guadalajara presented itself, however, the allies decided to wait until reinforcements had arrived from Valencia. This impasse was aggravated by revolts in Castile in favour of Philip V. Reinforcements did arrive later that year but they proved insufficient. Communications with Portugal were cut off and, under these conditions, the allies decided to relocate most of their forces to Valencia and Murcia.

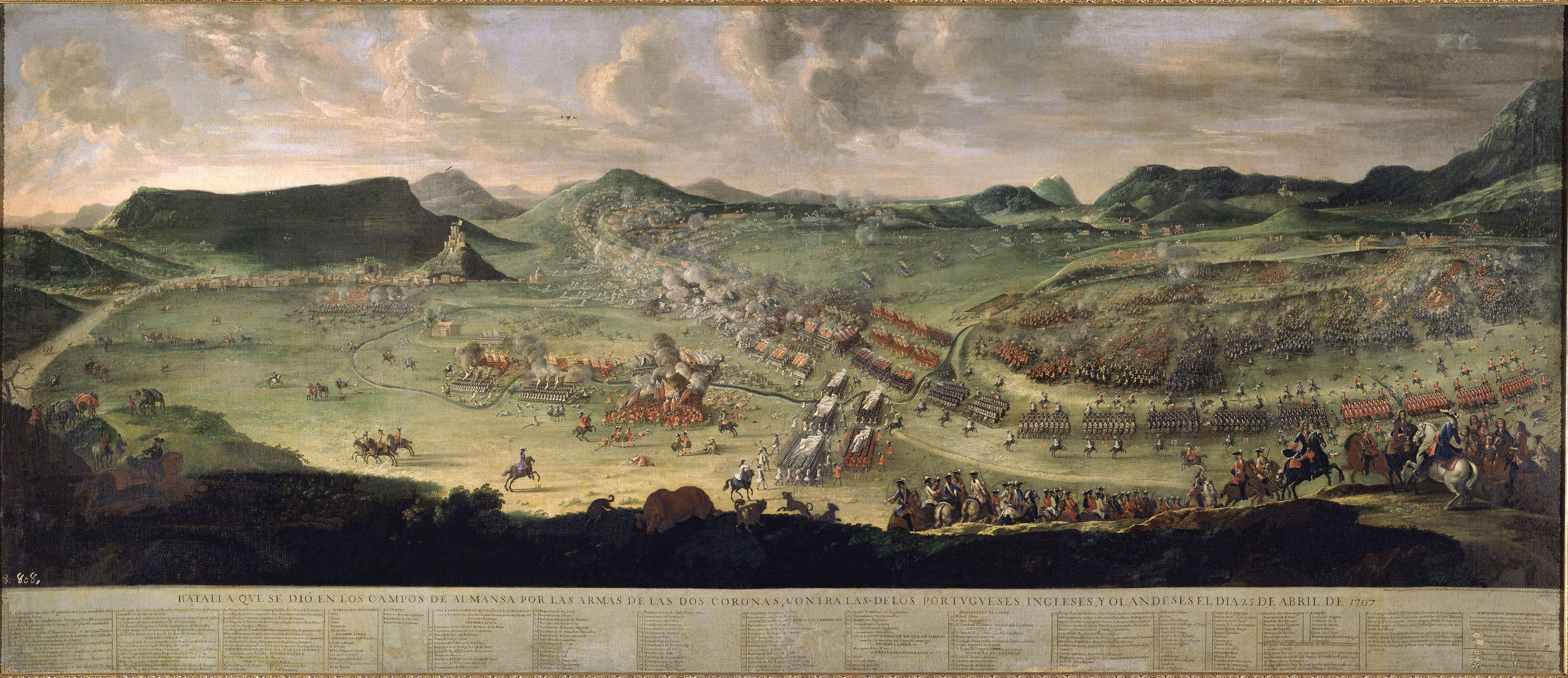
The battle of Almansa.

On 25 April 1707, the allied army numbering around 15,000 men, was decisively defeated at the Battle of Almansa by the Franco-Spanish forces, numbering around 25,000 men. After an exchange of artillery fire and the advance of the allied infantry, the Bourbon cavalry destroyed the left wing of the allies, which consisted of English infantry and Portuguese cavalry. The allied army thus withdrew to Catalonia and remained there on campaign, although commanded by James Stanhope and the Count of Atalaia Pedro Manuel de Ataíde, while the Earl of Galway and the Marquis of Minas embarked for Lisbon.

=== Last actions in western Iberia ===
After the allied army had been defeated at Almansa, the Spanish reoccupied Madrid and advanced on the western side of the Peninsula once more. Not only were Alcántara and Ciudad Rodrigo recovered, but the Spanish invaded Portugal once again and occupied Noudar, Serpa and Moura.

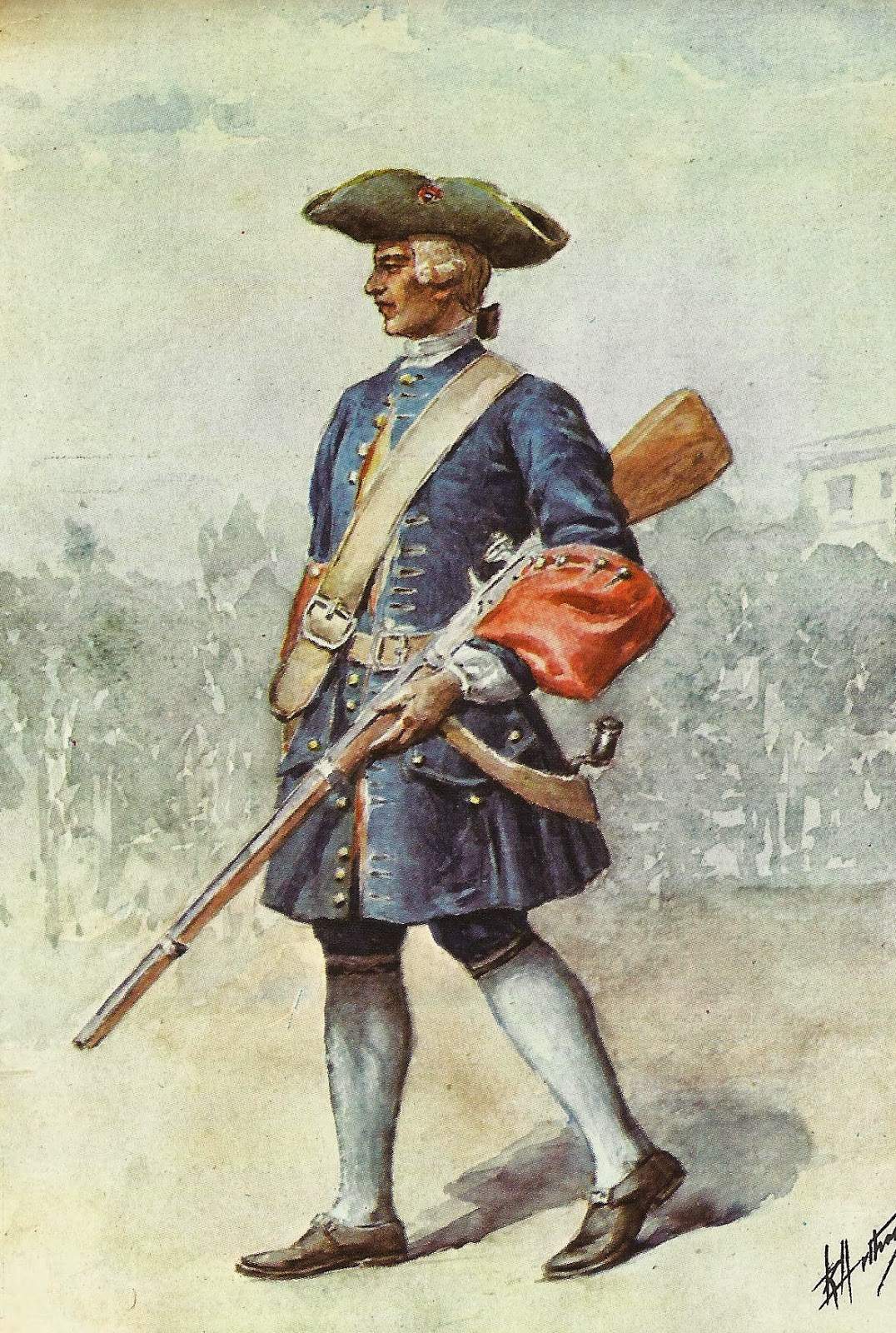
Portuguese fuzilier, 1740.

In 1707 still, Portugal replaced the obsolete terços with modern regiments. Each infantry regiment was to have a chief-of-staff of a colonel, a lieutenant-colonel, a sergeant-major and a helper, and they were divided in 12 companies, each with a captain, a lieutenant, an alferes, two sergeants, four corporals, two drummers and forty-four soldiers. Each cavalry or dragoon regiment was to have a chief-of-staff of one colonel, one liutenant-colonel, one sergeant-major, one helper, one surgeon and a chaplain, and they were to be divided in twelve companies, each with a captain, a lieutenant, an alferes, a furriel, three corporals, one trumpeter and 40 soldiers.

The Spanish withdrew from Serpa and Moura in 1708, which bolstered Portuguese morale. Most of the towns occupied by Spain in Alentejo were then recovered. New Portuguese incursions followed in Galicia and in Andalusia almost as far as Seville.

Meanwhile, the Earl of Galway took up the position of diplomatic representative of England in Portugal and he lobbied for a new campaign in Spain. In April 1709, the allies once more departed towards the Spanish Extremadura under the command of the Marquis of Fronteira but they were routed at the Battle of Caia by Franco-Spanish troops commanded by the Marquis of Bey. The Anglo-Portuguese withdrew with over 800 dead and wounded. It was the last meaningful engagement on the Portuguese side of the border in the war. Olivença was then attacked but although the Spanish were unable to take it, they destroyed the Bridge of Ajuda over the Guadiana River, which isolated Olivença from the rest of Portugal considerably and left it particularly vulnerable.

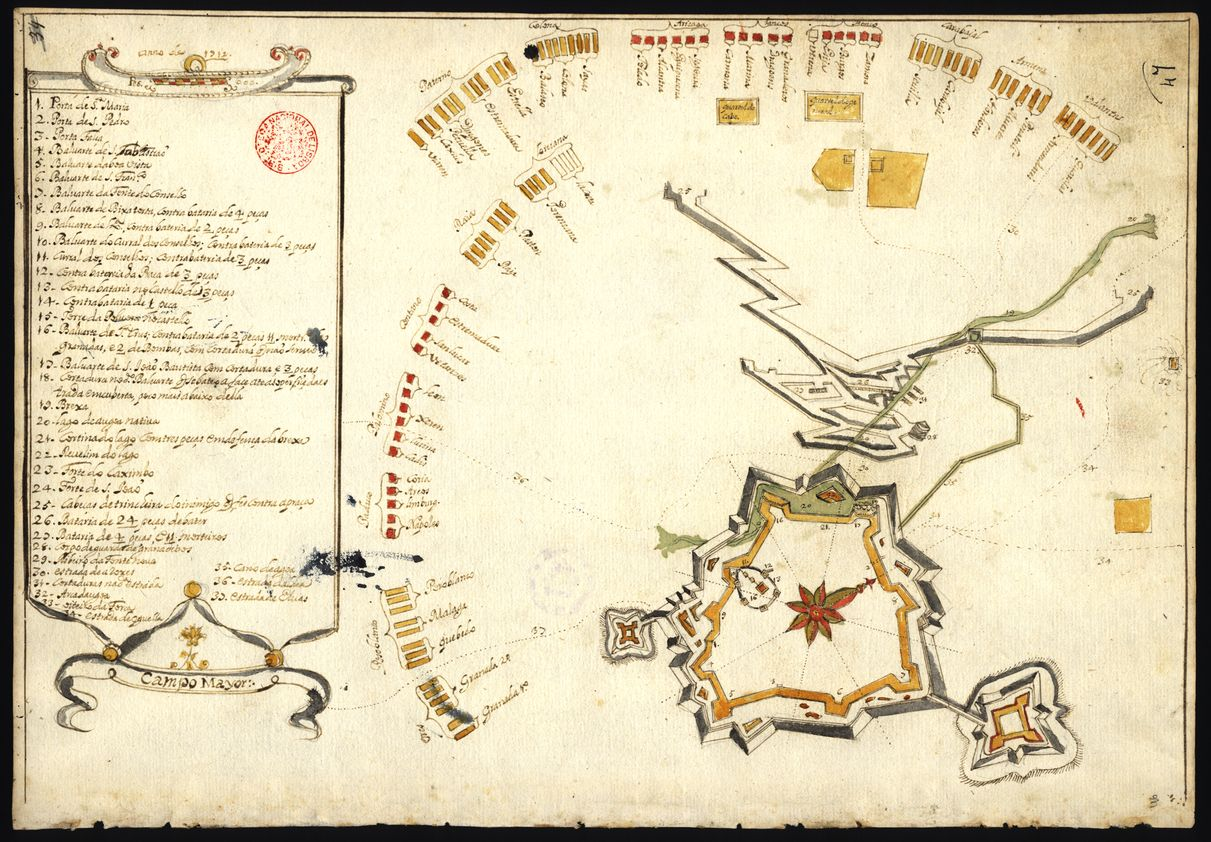
The siege of Campo Maior.

Miranda do Douro was occupied by the Spanish in 1710. The last meaningful actions involving Portugal in the war in Europe included the recovery of Miranda do Douro and the unsucceful siege of Campo Maior by a Franco-Spanish army of 18,000 men commanded by the Marquis of Bey, started when peace negotiations were already underway, and before an armistice was signed, in November.

== The Atlantic theater ==
Once hostilities had broken out, Portuguese possessions in the Atlantic were subject to attack by Spanish forces and French privateers. On 1 January 1705 the Spanish governor of Buenos Aires laid siege to Portuguese held Colonia del Sacramento in modern-day Uruguay, with an army of 5700 men among soldiers and native American auxiliaries, embarked on three ships.

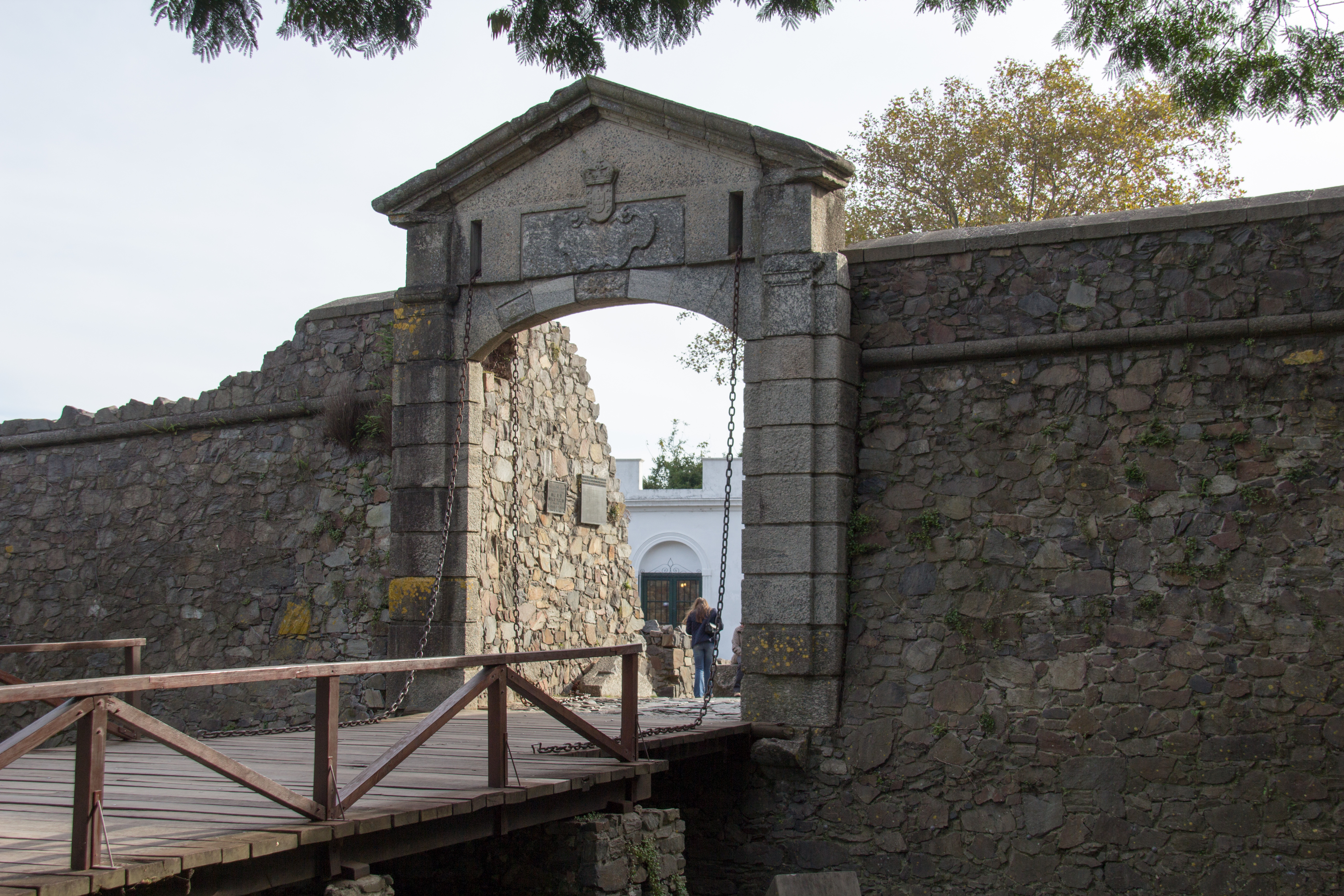
Gate bearing the arms of Portugal at Colonia del Sacramento.

As Portugal lacked the necessary manpower in Brazil to effectively defend the stronghold in the event of an all-out war, captain-of-war-and-sea Amaro José de Mendonça was dispatched to the River Plate with two ships of the line, one frigate and one patache, tasked with its evacuation. Upon arriving at the Plate, the Portuguese fleet fought the Spanish ships on March 5 and broke through the naval blockade. The Spanish on their part withdrew after four hours of naval combat but the Portuguese acknowledged their bravery despite their numerical and material disadvantage. Sacramento was then evacuated and its garrison returned to Brazil, along with all the residents.

Later that year in June, four French ships sacked Benguela, in modern-day Angola. In 1706 they attacked Príncipe Island.

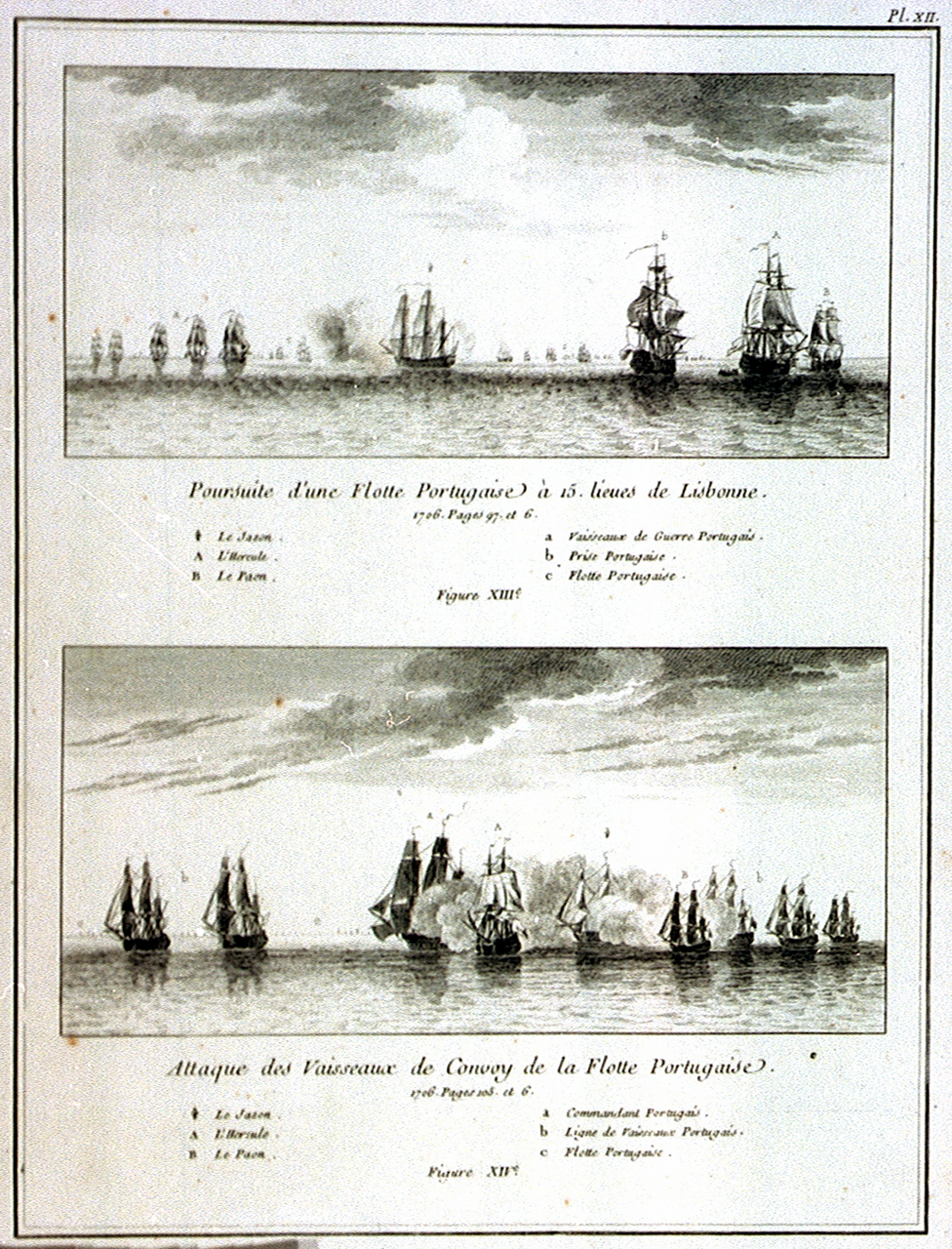
Naval battle near Lisbon, between French and Portuguese fleets.

On the occasion of the new year of 1706, French privateer René Duguay-Trouin was promoted to command of a three-ship squadron and instructed to proceed to Cadiz in Spain, whose governor he was to support in every way he could. By chance, on his way to Cadiz he encountered a Portuguese convoy of 153 merchantships bound to Portugal from Brazil, escorted by five ships-of-the-line and three Indiamen, twenty nautical miles west of Lisbon on 23 May. Duguay-Trouin attacked the isolated Portuguese 60-gun man-o-war São João de Deus in order to capture 20 or 30 merchantships that straggled but once the remaining four Portuguese warships approached, the French disengaged and retreated to Port-Louis to refit, chased for the remainder of the day by the Portuguese.

After the encounter with the Portuguese navy near Lisbon, French privateer René Duguay-Trouin drew up an ambitious plan to capture the yearly convoy that usually left Brazil every year in July bound for Portugal under heavy escort, and spent the winter of 1707-1708 putting together a fleet of eight well-armed ships. Because of the activity of French privateers since the beginning of the war, the convoy generally received a considerable reinforcement at the Azores. Duguay-Trouins recent successess strengthened the confidence of his townsmen in his plan, and his brother Barbinais de la Trouin had no difficulty forming a syndicate of Breton merchants to procure the funds with which to outfit the ships that the king had entrusted him. They sailed from Brest on August 1708 but the voyage to the Azores was long and harsh, and the fleet reached the islands battered by poor weather. Because their supplies ran low, the plan to attack the convoy was scrapped and the French limited themselves to sacking Faial and the towns of Velas and Calheta on São Jorge before returning to France.

Still in 1708, two pirate ships were engaged and chased off by the Portuguese warships Nossa Senhora das Portas do Céu and Bom Jesus de Mazagão on their way from Goa to Lisbon near Salvador in Brazil, probably in May.

=== Battle of Rio de Janeiro, 1710 ===
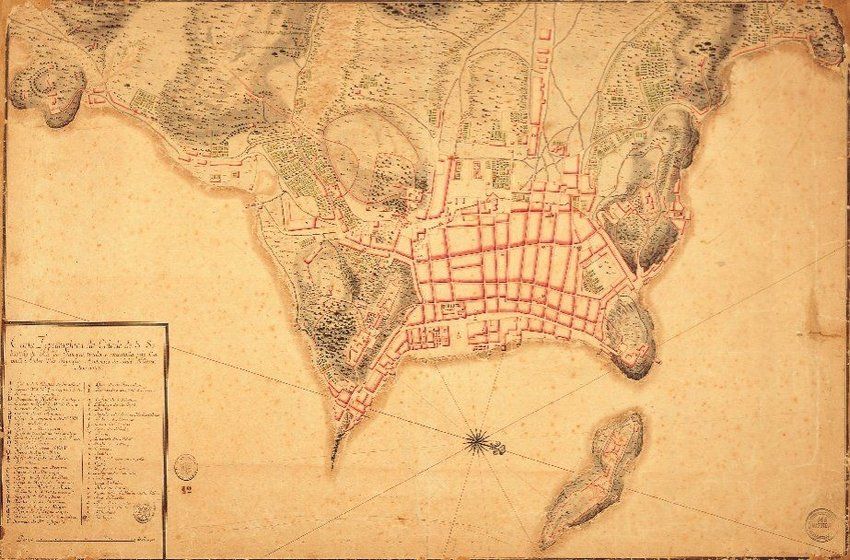
Map of Rio de Janeiro in the 18th century.

Shaken by successive defeats at sea, France and Spain adopted a policy of privateering instead of trying to openly contest the control of the sea from the English, Dutch and Portuguese. A fleet of five warships and one merchant ship bearing 800 soldiers, under the command of Jean-François Duclerc departed Brest bound to Rio de Janeiro, which the French intended to sack. Reports of French preparations however reached Lisbon and the governor of Rio was instructed to prepare for an attack.

Duclerc reached Rio and on September 18 the French tried to force their entry through the mouth of the Guanabara bay but they were repelled by the gunfire from the coastal fortresses. He then landed with 1200 men near Guaratiba, one of the numerous beaches south of the city. The Portuguese governor Francisco de Castro allowed the French to approach the city, but once they tried to take it by storm they were shattered. The French suffered 400 dead, 200 wounded and the Portuguese captured 440 men, Duclerc among them, against only 50 Portuguese dead and 80 wounded.

=== Battle of Rio de Janeiro, 1711 ===
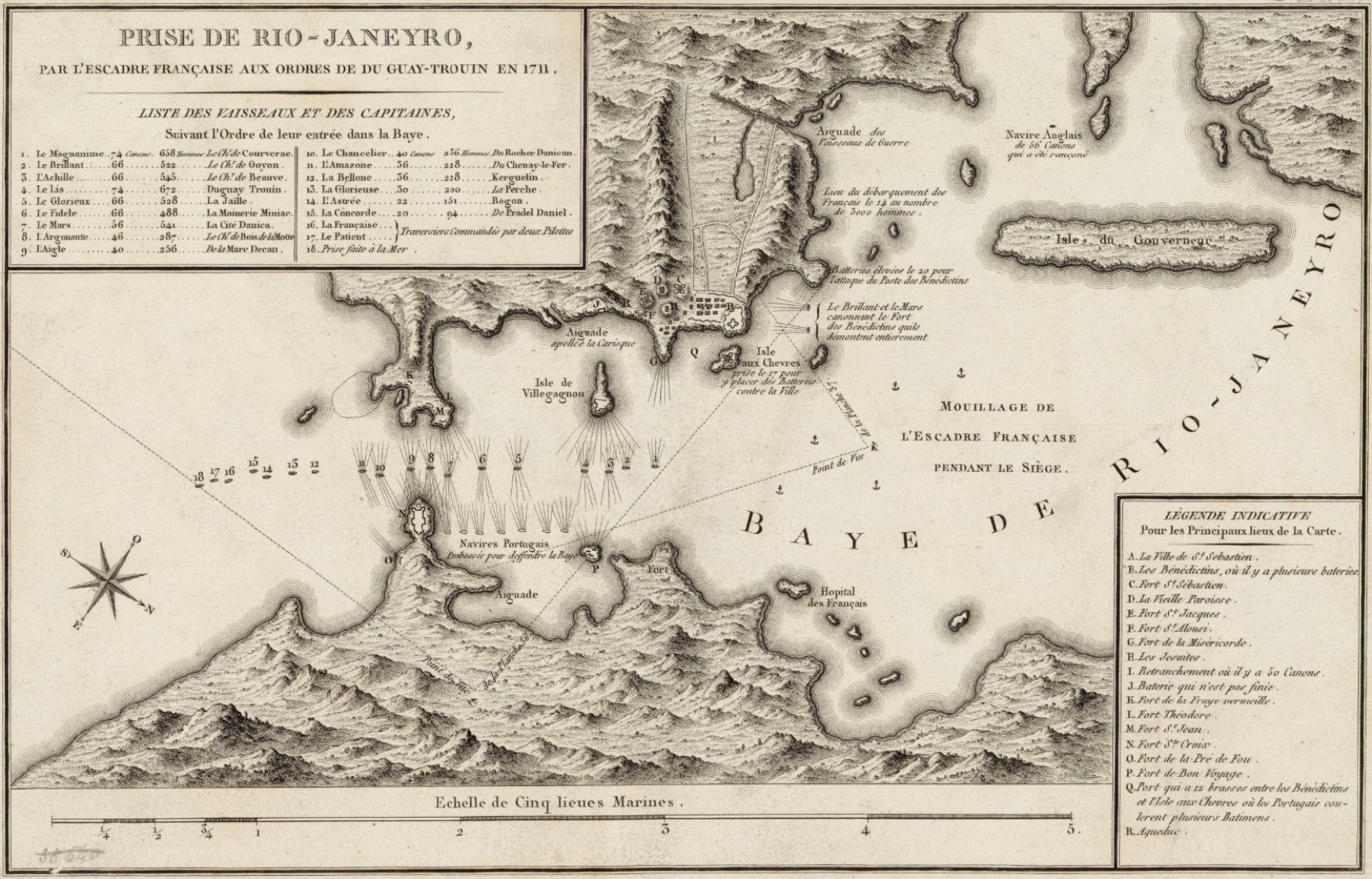
The French attack on Rio in 1711.

When news reached France of the fate of Duclercs expedition, a new one was outfitted with 17 ships and about 3000 soldiers, commanded by the renown privateer René Duguay Trouin. French preparations once more did not go unnoticed by Lisbon, and a fleet of four ships of the line and two frigates were dispatched to Brazil under the command of Gaspar da Costa de Ataíde. England was also requested to blockade Brest, but the English fleet dispatched to fulfill this mission arrived only after Trouin had sailed to Brazil.

Upon the arrival of Gaspar da Costa de Ataíde's fleet in Rio, governor-general Francisco de Castro Morais decided to anchor the fleet at the entrance to Guanabara Bay in order to cross its fire with the forts. Once this was done, he disembarked the soldiers and concentrated them in the city, in anticipation that Trouin would not try to forcibly sail into the bay and attack the ships, but would land on the southern beaches, as Duclerc had done the previous year.

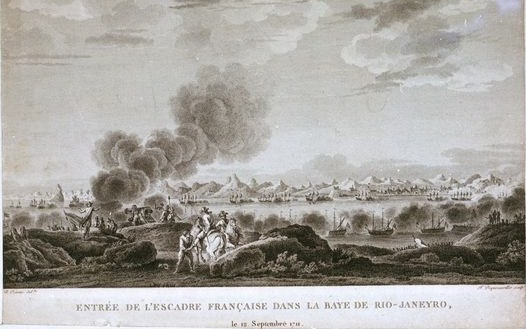
Entry of Duguay-Trouin in the Guanabara Bay.

Duguay Trouin arrived in Rio de Janeiro on 12 September and the city was covered in thick fog. The French however did force their way into Guanabara Bay and their fleet was bombarded by Portuguese ships and forts, causing considerable damage, but when it became clear that Trouin intended to board and capture the ships, Gaspar da Costa set fire to them to deny them to the French. Nevertheless, two were taken. On 14 September, Trouin occupied Ilha das Cobras and on the 20th began bombarding the city from there. The bombardment demoralized the resident defenders, who began to evacuate to the interior. On the 21st, the French attacked the city and although resistance was fierce in some areas, come night the defenders abandoned it discreetly and moved inland. Realising that the city was empty, the French occupied it on the 22nd.

Once Rio de Janeiro was occupied, Trouin obtained a ransom from Governor Castro de Morais in exchange for the city and then left in November. In the years that followed the French attack, Portugal considerably reinforced the defenses of Rio de Janeiro.

=== Attack on Cape Verde, 1712 ===
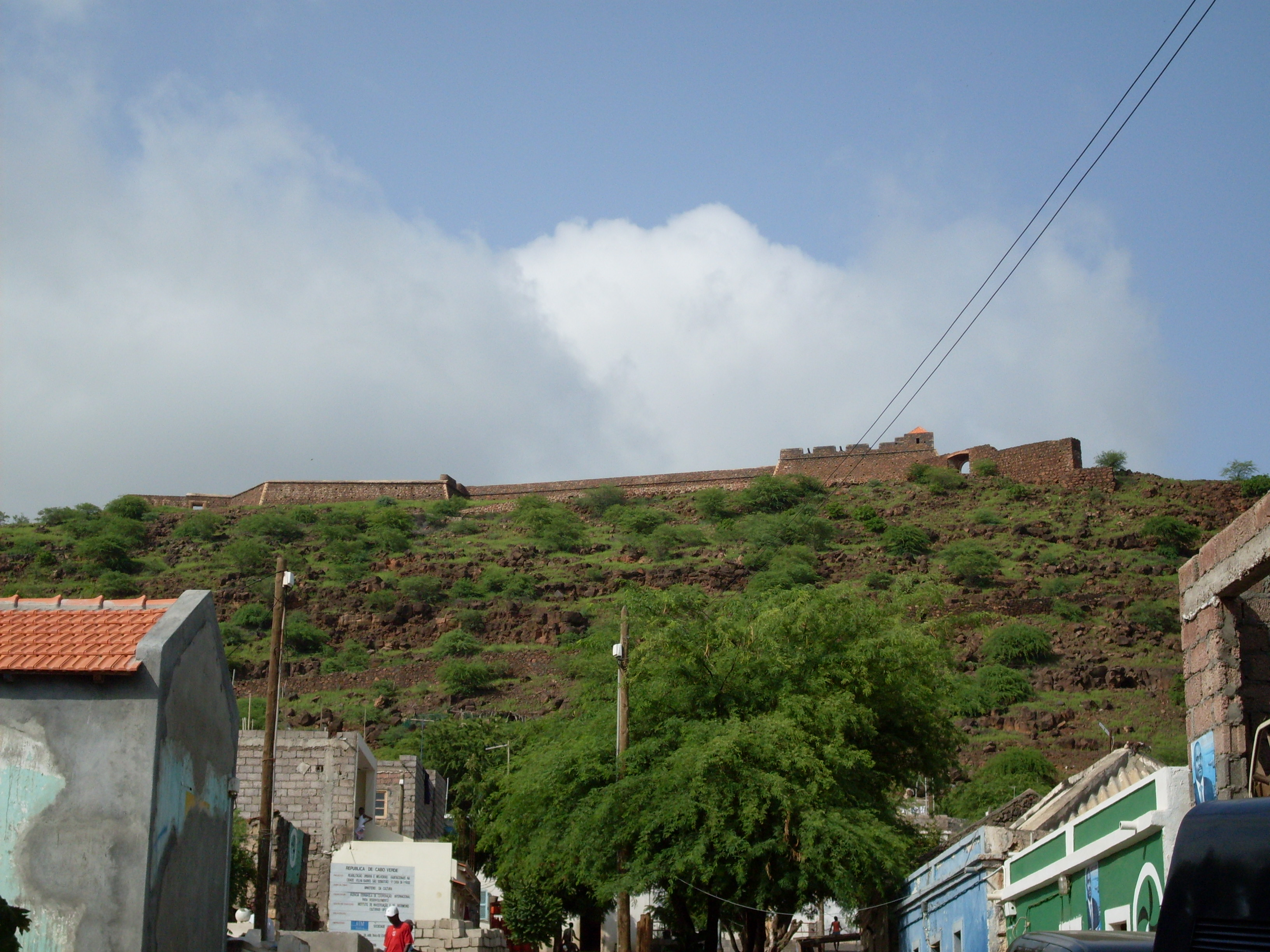
Fort São Filipe in Cidade Velha, Cape Verde.

Santiago in Cape Verde was attacked on 12 May 1712 by a French fleet led by the privateer Jacques Cassard, who commanded eleven ships manned by 3,000 sailors and 1,200 soldiers. The French landed at Praia Negra, near Praia, and captured Fort São Filipe, before moving on to plunder Ribeira Grande.

== Peace of Utrecht and aftermath ==
Peace negotiations began on 29 January 1712. Seeking to obtain better terms, Spain invaded the Alentejo, but the heroic resistance of Campo Maior prevented Portugal from attending the peace conference on unfavourable terms.

The Treaty of Utrecht was signed on 11 April 1713. Although Portugal did not achieve all its objectives, Portuguese participation in the conflict was generally considered satisfactory. France renounced its claims to the Amapá on the north bank of the Amazon River while Spain returned Colónia do Sacramento to Portugal. Portugal affirmed its position among the European powers and demonstrated clearly that a reconquest of Portugal was impossible, thus beginning a new era in Portuguese diplomacy. The war resulted in widespread devastation in the border regions however, but it was followed by fifty years of peace and neutrality, which allowed Portugal to focus on its overseas commitments and reap the benefits of trade.

At the end of hostilities, the Portuguese army at home numbered 20,400 infantry and 9600 cavalrymen in 1715, not including provincial troops or troops committed overseas.

=== Post-scriptum: the Battle of the Straits of Malacca, 1714 ===
The Treaty of Utrecht was signed in 1713, but while news of the peace did not reach all of Portugal and France's overseas territories, a naval battle still took place between the two countries.

French privateer Henri Bouynot was by then attacking allied shipping off the coast of Brazil but without much success, so he the decided to cross the Strait of Magellan and head for the Far East via the Pacific to attack allied shipping there. Near the island of Alor in the East Indies, he captured several English, Chinese and Portuguese ships, whose loot he later sold in Manila. While there, he decided to try and capture the Portuguese ship that linked Macau and Goa yearly, but made no secret of his plans. Bouynot had at his disposal the frigate Le Saint Louis, with 54 guns and 300 men, and Le François, with 36 guns and 200 men. It is not known, however, if news of the end of hostilities had already reached the Philippines by then and if Bouynot learnt about it while in Manila or not, which would mean the difference between legitimate privateering and simple piracy.

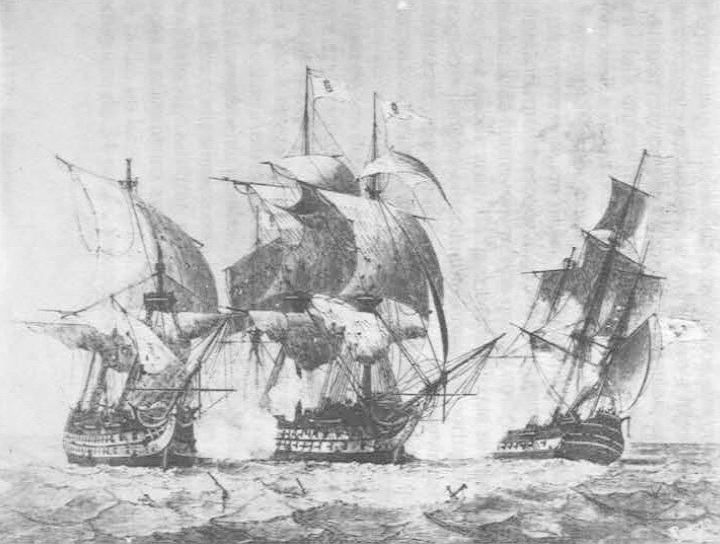
Battle of the Strait of Malacca, 1714.

The ship that sailed between Goa and Macau in 1713 was the Nossa Senhora da Nazaré, commanded by Captain Paulo da Costa. Upon learning of Bouynot's plan in Macau, he reinforced his crew and the ship's armament, increasing the crew to 206 men and the artillery to 40 pieces. In the Strait of Malacca, the Nossa Senhora da Nazaré was intercepted by the two frigates of Bouynot, who ordered Paulo da Costa to surrender, but the Portuguese responded with gunfire and a naval battle ensued, lasting from the 8th to the 10th, until the French called off the fight. Upon reaching Goa, the officers were well rewarded and Paulo da Costa was promoted.

== See also ==
- Portuguese War of Restoration
- Spanish–Portuguese War (1735–1737)
- Spanish–Portuguese War (1776–1777)
