= Henri de Massue, Earl of Galway =

British Army general (1648–1720)

Lieutenant-General The Right Honourable The Earl of Galway PC PC (Ire)
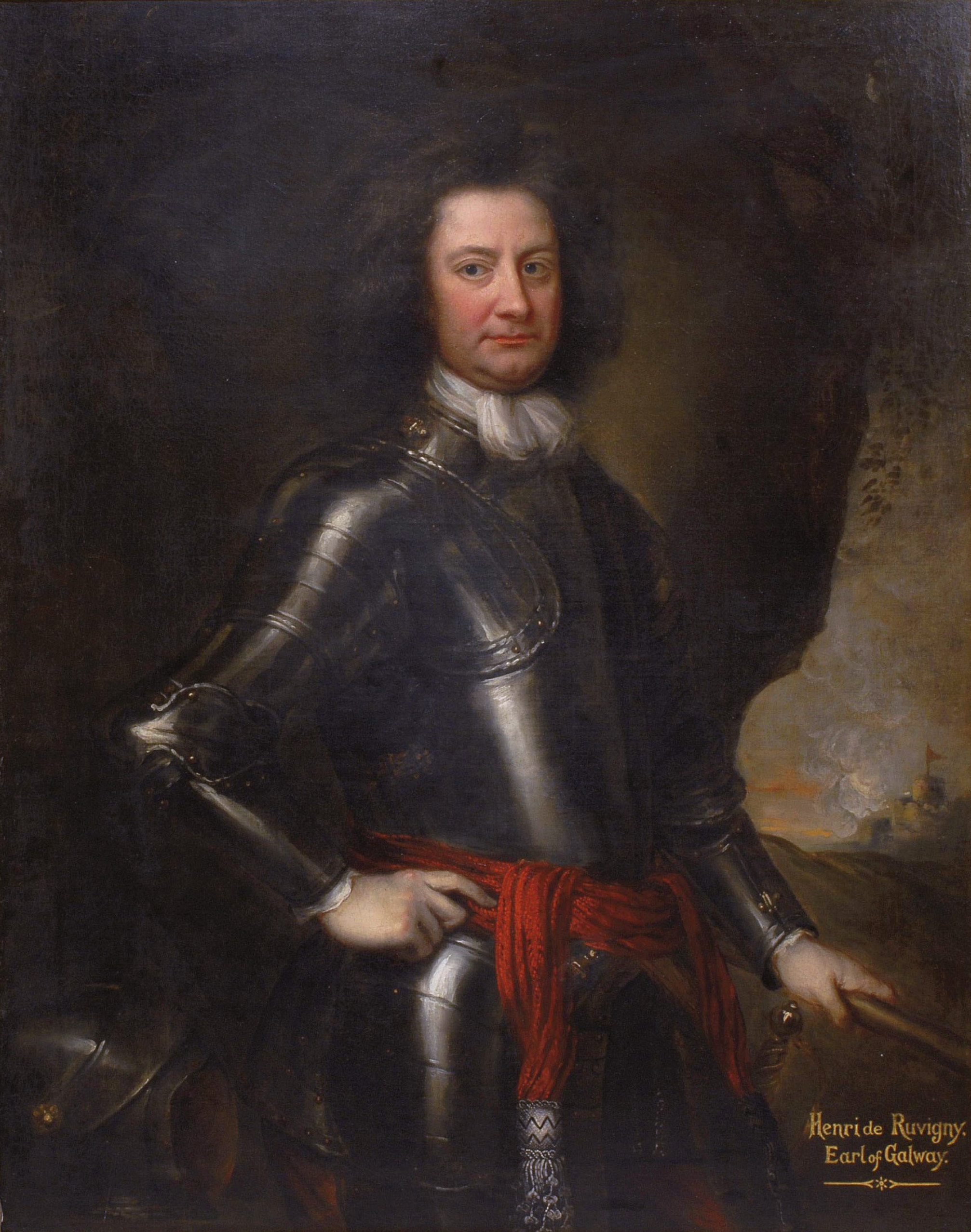

Lord Justice of Ireland
- In office 1697–1701
- Monarch: William III

Personal details
- Born: 9 April 1648 Paris, France
- Died: 3 September 1720 (aged 72) Stratton Park, Hampshire

Military service
- Allegiance: Kingdom of France; Kingdom of England; Kingdom of Great Britain
- Branch/service: French Army; British Army
- Rank: Lieutenant-General
- Battles/wars: Franco-Dutch War; Nine Years' War; Battle of Aughrim (1690); Battle of Landen (1693); War of the Spanish Succession; Siege of Badajoz (1705); Siege of Alcantara (1706); Battle of Almansa (1707); Battle of La Gudina (1709); Jacobite rising of 1715

Henri de Massue, 2nd Marquis de Ruvigny, Earl of Galway, PC, PC (Ire) (9 April 1648 – 3 September 1720) was a French Huguenot soldier and diplomat who was influential in the English service in the Nine Years' War and the War of the Spanish Succession.

== Biography ==
Massue was born in Paris. He was the son of the 1st Marquis de Ruvigny, a distinguished French diplomat, and a nephew of Rachel, the wife of Thomas Wriothesley, 4th Earl of Southampton. He was a soldier and served in the French army under Turenne, who thought very highly of him. Probably on account of his English connections he was selected in 1678 by Louis XIV to carry out the secret negotiations for a compact with Charles II, a difficult mission which he executed with great skill. He succeeded his father as deputy-general of the Huguenots, and refused Louis's offer, at the Revocation of the Edict of Nantes, to retain him in that office. In 1690, having gone into exile with many fellow Huguenots, he entered the service of William III of England as a major-general, thereby forfeiting his French estates.

In July 1691 he distinguished himself at the Battle of Aughrim, and in 1692 he was for a time commander-in-chief in Ireland. In November of that year he was created Viscount Galway and Baron Portarlington, and received a large grant of seized estates in Ireland. The title had previously belonged to Ulick Burke, 1st Viscount Galway, a Jacobite officer who had been killed at Aughrim.

In 1693 he fought at Neerwinden and was wounded. In 1694, with the rank of lieutenant-general, he was sent to command a force in English pay that was to assist the Duke of Savoy against the French, and at the same time to relieve the distressed Vaudois. In 1695 Savoy changed sides, the Italian peninsula was neutralised, and Galway's force was withdrawn to the Netherlands. From 1697 to 1701, a critical period of Irish history, the Earl of Galway (he was advanced to that rank in 1697) was practically in control of Irish affairs as Lord Justice of Ireland. After some years spent in retirement, he was appointed in 1704 to command the allied forces in Portugal together with François Nicolas Fagel, a post which he sustained with honour and success until the Battle of Almanza in 1707, in which Galway, in spite of care and skill on his own part, was decisively defeated by the Duke of Berwick. His aide de camp was Hector Francois Chataigner de Cramahé, son in law of Jacques de Belrieu, Baron de Virazel.

Galway scraped together a fresh army, and although infirm, was reappointed to his command by the home government. He took part in one more campaign, and distinguished himself by his personal bravery in action. Marquis de Bay defeated him at the Battle of La Gudina. After this, he retired from active life. His last service was rendered in 1715, when he was sent as one of the lords justices to Ireland during the Jacobite insurrection. As most of his property in Ireland had been restored to its former owners, and all his French estates had long before been forfeited, Parliament voted him pensions amounting to 1500 pounds a year. He died unmarried. The Irish peerage died with him, but not the French marquisate.

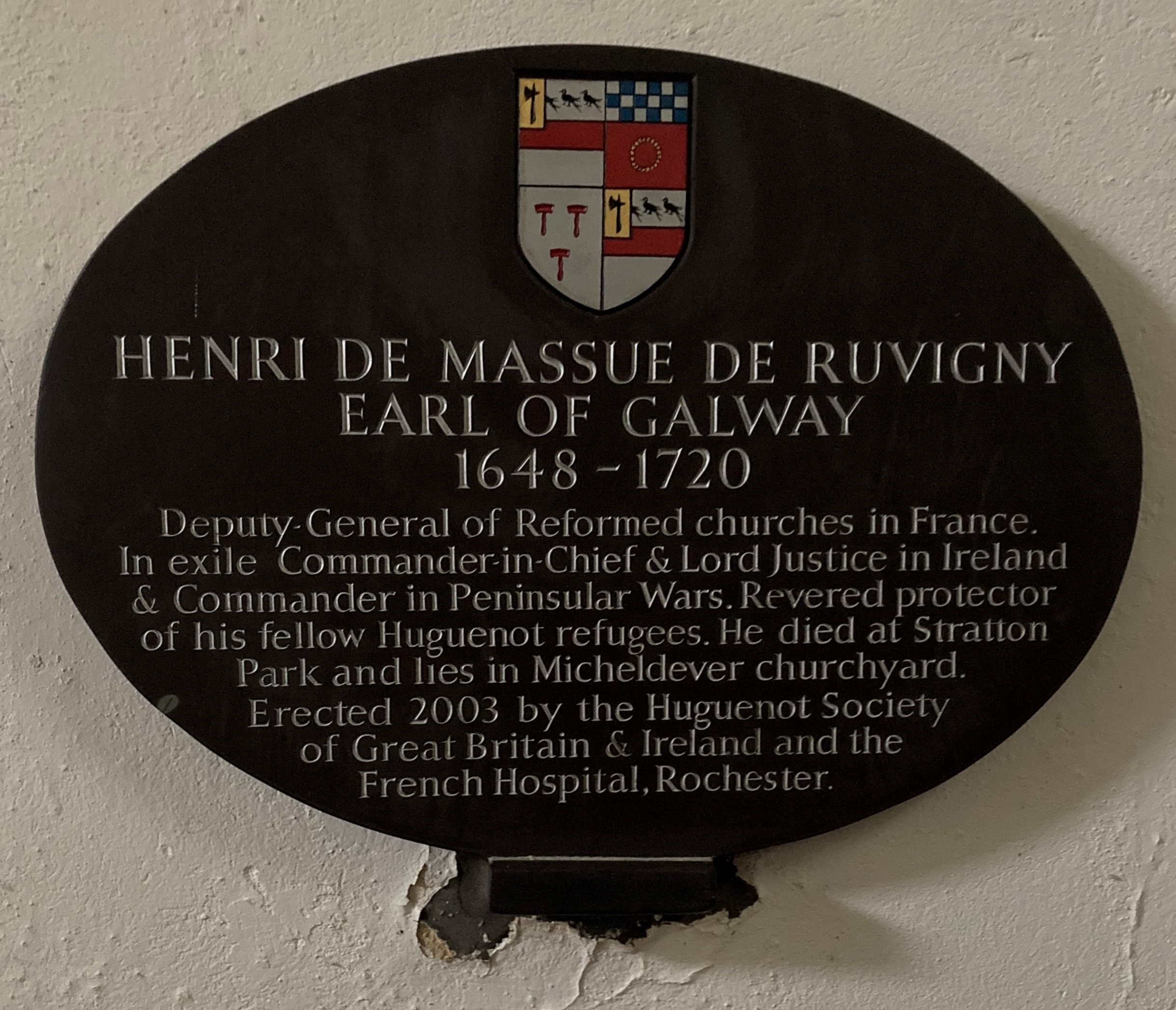
Memorial in St Mary's Church, Micheldever

The French Hospital in north London was incorporated under the Great Seal in 1718, with Galway as its governor.

== Sources ==
- Boulger, Demetrius Charles (1911). The Battle of the Boyne. London: Martin Secker. OCLC 1041056932.

Peerage of Ireland
New title	Earl of Galway; 1697–1720	Extinct
New title	Viscount Galway; 1692–1720	Extinct
New title	Baron Portarlington; 1692–1720	Extinct
