= Siege of Ostend (1706) =

1706 siege

- Part of War of the Spanish Succession
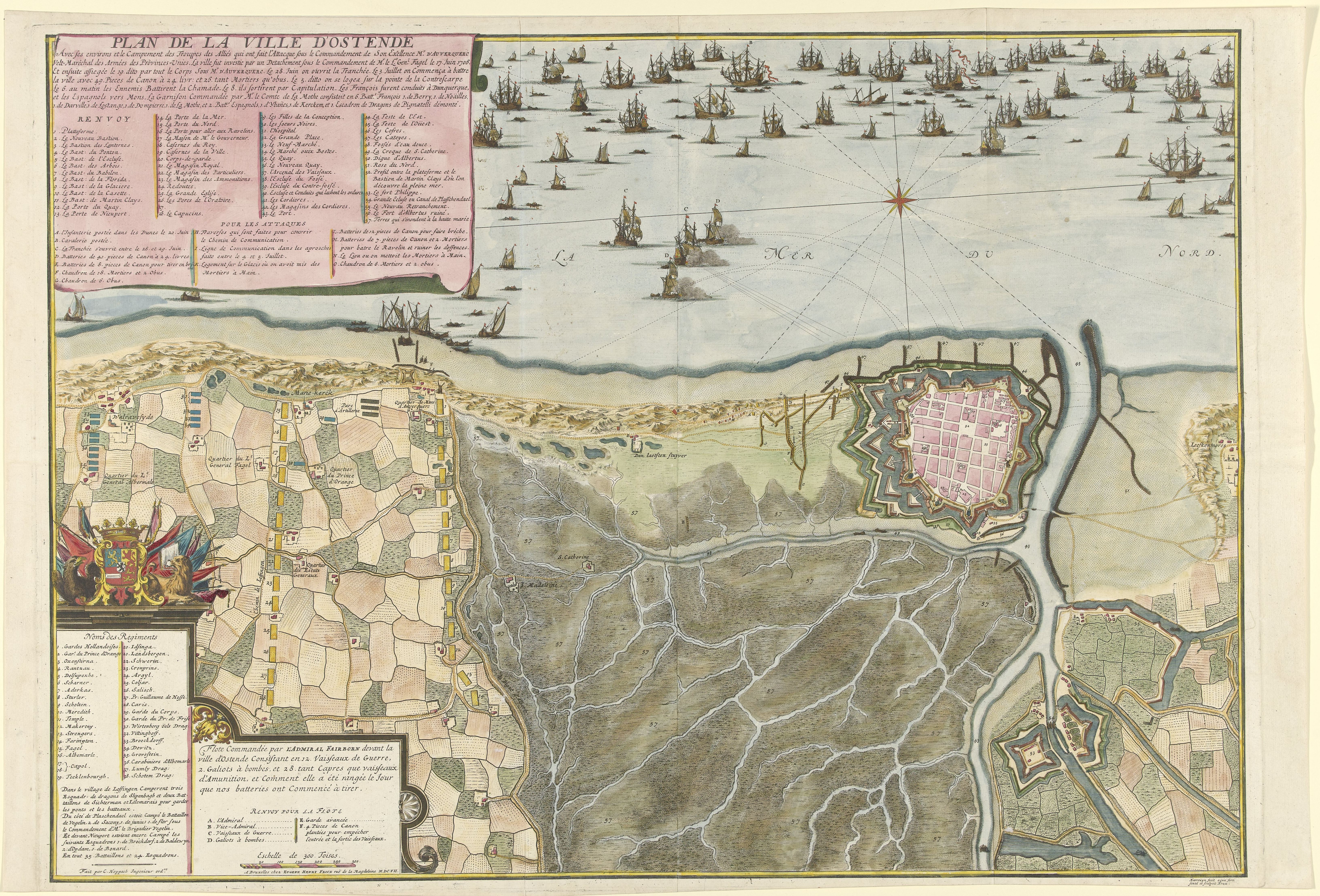
Date	15 June – 7 July 1706
Location	Ostend, Spanish Netherlands
Result	Allied victory

Belligerents
Grand Alliance; Dutch Republic; England; Scotland	(Kingdom of France) France

Commanders and leaders
(Dutch Republic) Lord Overkirk (Dutch Republic) François Nicolas Fagel; Duke of Argyll	(Kingdom of France) Count de la Mothe

Strength
26,000	3,500

Casualties and losses
430–1,050 killed or wounded	

The siege of Ostend took place during the War of the Spanish Succession. In the wake of the Allied victory over the French at the Battle of Ramillies in May 1706, town and cities across the Spanish Netherlands rapidly surrendered to the Duke of Marlborough's victorious forces often without a fight. Ostend, a port on the North Sea coast, offered more resistance.

Determined not to "give the enemy any breathing space", Marlborough detached Dutch and British forces under Henry de Nassau, Lord Overkirk to deal with it. Meanwhile he established his main army at Roeselare as a covering force to protect the siege operations from the French army which had regrouped at Courtrai to the south.

Naval support for the besiegers came from a Royal Navy squadron under Sir Stafford Fairborne. Fairborne used bomb ketches to fire on the town, setting it alight. After a three week siege Ostend capitulated. In the wake of Ostend's fall, Marlborough was offered the Governor Generalship of the Spanish Netherlands but was forced to decline it for fear of offending his Dutch allies.

== Bibliography ==
- Falkner, James. The War of the Spanish Succession 1701-1714. Pen and Sword, 2015.
- Webb, Stephen Saunders. Marlborough's America. Yale University Press, 2013.
- De Graaf, Ronald (2021). Friso: het tragische leven van Johan Willem Friso [Friso: the tragic life of John William Friso] (in Dutch). Boom. ISBN 978-90-2443-676-7.
- Nimwegen, Olaf van (1995). De subsistentie van het leger: Logistiek en strategie van het Geallieerde en met name het Staatse leger tijdens de Spaanse Successieoorlog in de Nederlanden en het Heilige Roomse Rijk (1701-1712) [The subsistence of the Allied and especially the Dutch army during the War of the Spanish Succession] (Thesis) (in Dutch). Universiteit Utrecht.
