= Battle of La Gudiña =

1709 battle of the War of the Spanish Succession

Coordinates: 39.1167°N 7.2833°W

- Part of the War of the Spanish Succession
Date	7 May 1709
Location	Near Arronches and Campo Maior, on the frontier between Portugal and Spain
Result	Spanish victory

Belligerents
Kingdom of Portugal; Great Britain	Spain

Commanders and leaders
(Portugal) Marquis of Fronteira (Kingdom of Great Britain) Earl of Galway	(Spain) Marquis de Bay

Strength
18,000 infantry 5,000 cavalry	16,000 infantry and cavalry

Casualties and losses
4,000 dead, wounded or captured 17 cannons taken	400 dead or wounded

The Battle of La Gudiña, Battle of Val Gudina, or Battle of Campo Maior (Spanish: Batalla de La Gudiña; Portuguese: Batalha de Caia), was fought on 7 May 1709 near Arronches between the Spanish Bourbon army of Extremadura, under the Marquis de Bay, and the Portuguese and British, under the Huguenot Earl of Galway and the Marquis of Fronteira. This battle resulted in a crushing defeat for the Anglo-Portuguese army, 4,000-5,000 soldiers were killed, wounded or captured, while the Spanish had only 400 soldiers dead or wounded.

Advancing from Elvas and passing the river Caya (Caia in Portuguese) the Anglo-Portuguese army had in front the Spaniards commanded by the Marquis de Bay. On 7 May and on the plain of La Gudiña the two armies met. The Portuguese cavalry was routed with but slight resistance, and it left exposed two battalions of English foot, which were thus cut off and compelled to lay down their arms. Henri de Massue, Earl of Galway, who had a horse shot from under him, narrowly escaped being taken prisoner with them. The rest of the Anglo-Portuguese army made an orderly retreat to Elvas, maintaining their position there during the rest of the campaign, the danger of an allied invasion from the Portuguese frontier was staved off for the moment.

== Background ==
After the defeat at the Battle of Almansa, the British situation was desperate, they were no longer present in the south-eastern territory of Spain and had minimum or no influence in the course of the war. Henri de Massue formally pressed London to send more reinforcements, and Britain responded sending 25,000 men. About 8,000 British troops were sent to Portugal under the orders of the Earl of Galway, and the rest to Catalonia.

In Portugal, Galway met with the Marquis of Fronteira to prepare a combined attack against the Bourbon allies of Spain and advance toward Madrid. But for this, first they had to capture the city of Badajoz, a Spanish stronghold near the Portuguese frontier. In the past, Henri de Massue had already tried twice to capture the city without success. This time he did not take the risk. Knowing that France had withdrawn some troops as a consequence of defeats of Louis XIV in Flanders, his Anglo-Portuguese army crossed the border near the fortress of Campo Mayor, composed of maximum 20,000 Portuguese and 8,000 English, towards Badajoz. While his enormous supply train crosses the river Caya, the Anglo-Portuguese made contact with the vanguards of the Spanish cavalry in the fields of Gudiña.

The allies, according to the Portuguese account, were 49 regiments of infantry and cavalry, against only 40 on the side of their Spanish opponents; according to the London Gazette, No 4538, about 17,000 foot and 5,000 horse in very good order, and, by the reports from the deserters, much superior in number to the enemy. The Spanish army were, by their published line of battle, about 24 battalions and 47 squadrons. The artillery of each party was stated as equal, or 20 pieces of artillery.

== Battle ==
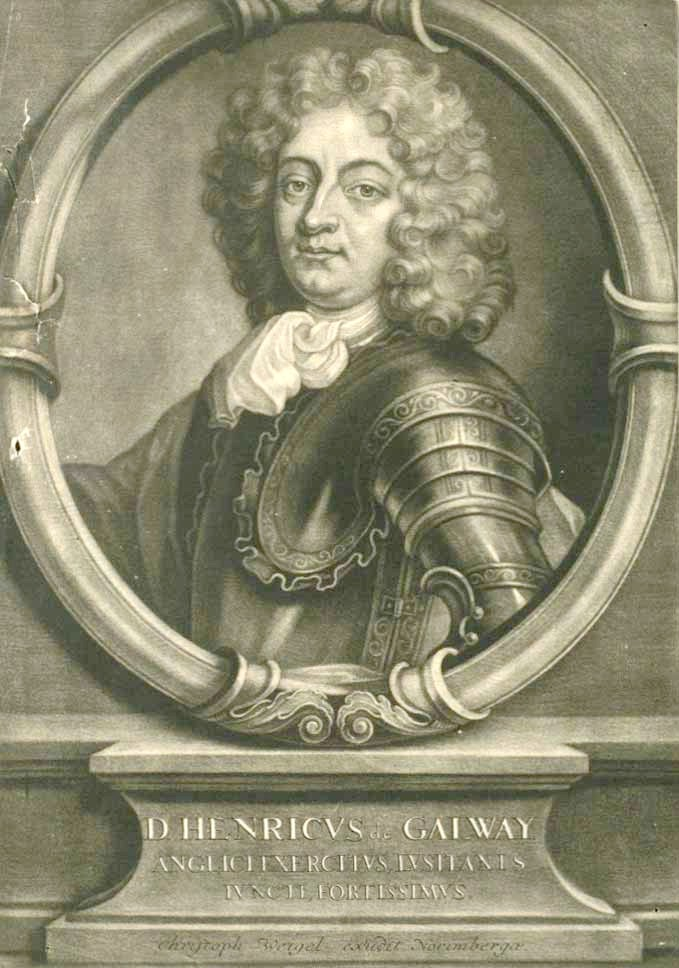
Henri de Massue, Earl of Galway, Marquis de Ruvigny, by Christoph Weige

The allied army which had thrown nine bridges across the river Caya, were ready to do battle. In the center were deployed troops of the Marquis of Fronteira, but his troops were unable to see the Spanish infantry, unlike the cavalry. On the left flank, the first line was commanded by the Count of San Juan, and the second line was positioned under the command of the Earl of Galway, with three British regiments. The allies stretched this wing to take advantage of their numerical superiority, and thus outflank the opposing Spanish wing.

After several attacks designed to attract Anglo-Portuguese forces, the Marquis de Bay, -who commanded the Spanish cavalry on the right flank- sent the Spaniards to attack the Portuguese in the first row. The very well trained and experienced Spanish cavalry made the Portuguese flee. The Count of San Juan desperately tried to reorganize its troops but failed and was captured. The Spanish cavalry also captured a battery of artillery.

Lord Galway then launched an attack to take the battery with 3 regiments. The Spanish dragoons dismounted and engaged the English, which were forced to retreat. Because the Spanish cavalry was dominating the battlefield, the English attempted to retreat into a building. At that point, Galway jumped on a horse and fled. Lord Barrymore and General Pearse were captured. Practically every soldier of the 3 British regiments was either killed or captured. The Spanish cavalry pursued the Anglo-Portuguese, killing 1,500 and capturing 1,000.

The first and second lines of the Anglo-Portuguese wing fled. English Col. Ally, who commanded the center, which had no cavalry, also took flight, even before the Spanish infantry arrived on the field. Leaving all the standards, as well as tents, baggage and guns on the field, he recrossed the river Caya, without destroying the bridges behind their passage.

== Aftermath ==
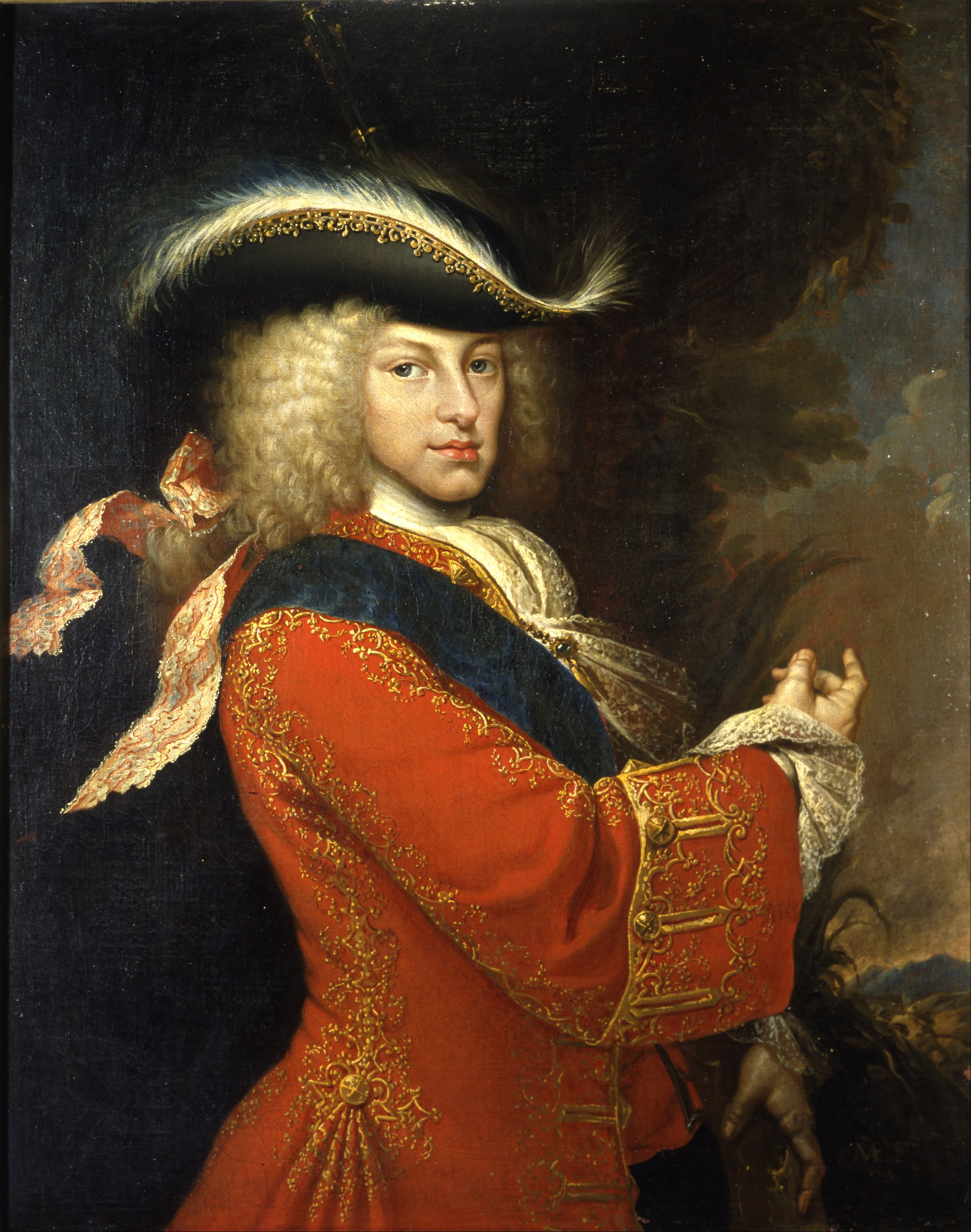
King Philip V of Spain by Miguel Jacinto Meléndez

The Portuguese and British were severely defeated, with the loss of about 1,700 men killed or wounded, about 2,300 prisoners, 17 cannon, 15 colours or standards, as well as tents, and baggage. The Spaniards having had about 400 men, and 100 horses, killed or wounded.

Of the 2,300 prisoners, the greater number, around 1,500, were Queen Anne's troops, and the remainder, or 800, were Portuguese. The highest ranking British officers made prisoners, were Major-General James Barry, 4th Earl of Barrymore, Nicholas Sankey; Brigadier-General Thomas Pearce; the 2nd Colonel of the Regiment of Galway, with Major Thomas Gordon of that corps; Lieutenant-Colonel Henry Meredith of the Regiment of Colonel Thomas Stanwix, and Lord Henry Pawlet, Aide-de-Camp to the Earl of Galway; the latter nobleman, (unfortunate here as at Almansa,) after having a horse shot out from under him, only escaping with difficulty.

The Allies were thus disappointed in the preparations they had made, of being able, through their superior numbers, to capture Badajoz, and had the additional mortification to witness above 30 leagues of the Portuguese territory placed under contribution by the Marquis de Bay, who subsisted his army at the expense of his adversaries, by the end of this campaign.

So generally discreditable to the British did their intelligence from Portugal appear, that a contemporary London annalist says: "For my part, I think the stories, and excuses, sent us from thence, are as mean, and poor, as our fighting, and conduct, seem to be." The victory, which led to such satisfactory results for Philip V of Spain, Brigadier Henry Crofton with his Regiment of Dragoons of 4 squadrons, was in the 1st line of the Spanish right wing of cavalry, by whose impetuous charge, upon their Portuguese opponents, it is stated, that "all the cavalry of the 2 lines of the enemy's left was, in less than half an hour, broken, overthrown, and put to flight."
