= Siege of Campo Maior (1712) =

Coordinates: 39°00′45″N 7°04′10″W

- Part of the War of the Spanish Succession
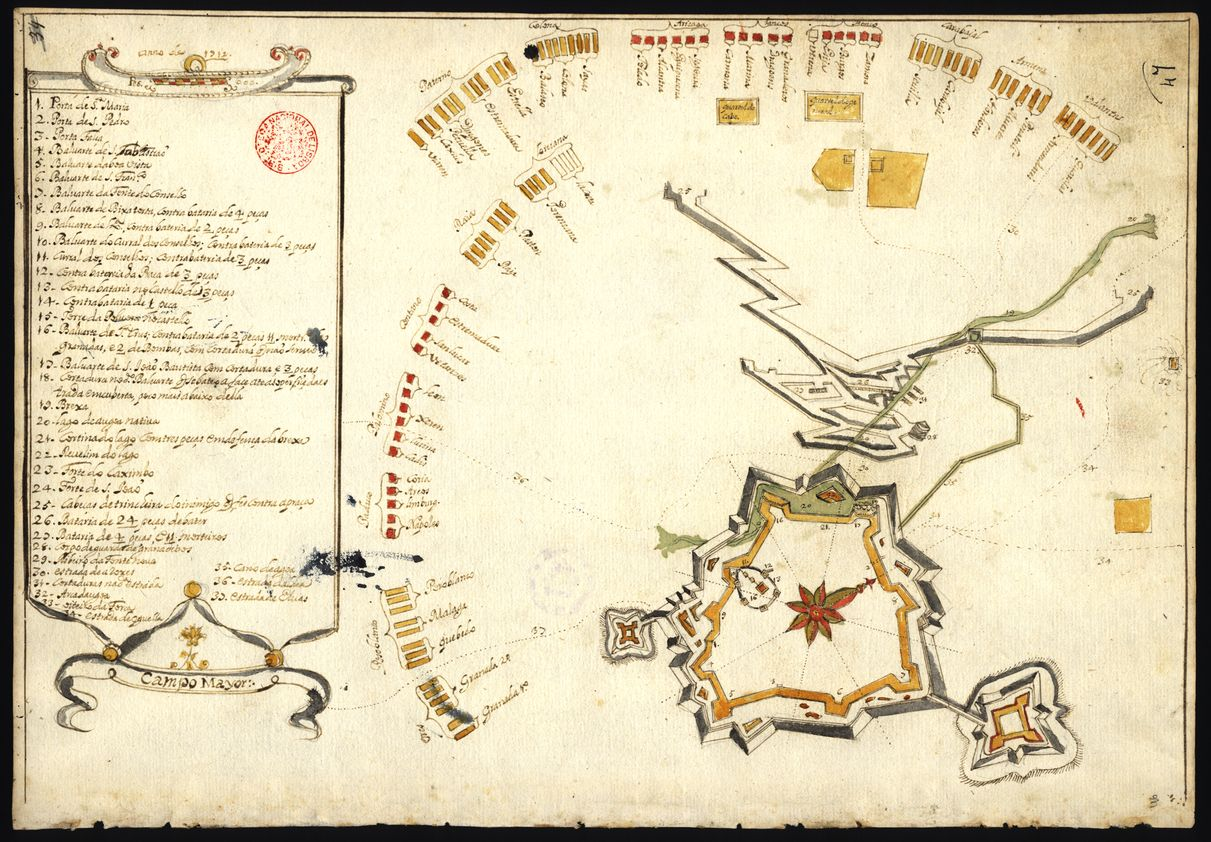
- Map of the siege of Campo Maior
Date	28 September – 29 October 1712
Location	Campo Maior, Portugal
Result	Portuguese victory

Belligerents
Portugal	Spain

Commanders and leaders
Count of Ribeira Grande; Estevão da Gama	Alexandre Maître

Strength
947 soldiers 306 militia 70 horse	10,000 footsoldiers 8,000 horsemen

Casualties and losses
103 dead, 77 wounded, 47 POWs among soldiers and militias	700–2,000 dead and wounded

The siege of Campo Maior was a military operation of the War of the Spanish Succession that took place in 1712 and in which Campo Maior resisted a siege by a Spanish army commanded by Alexandre Maître, Marquis de Bay.

== Background ==
The attack on Campo Maior was part of a Spanish attempt to invade Portugal and was the last large-scale military episode for the Portuguese forces in the war. As the army of Marquis de Bay approached, Governor Estevão da Gama requested support from the garrison of Moura and received 500 men in reinforcements in the middle of the night, commanded by Miguel Hogan, an Irish officer. General Mascarenhas granted the governorship of the stronghold to Luís Manuel da Câmara, 3rd Count of Ribeira Grande, at a time when the town was already under siege and the Count sought to enter it. The general provided the governor with 300 grenadiers and 70 cavalrymen to break the blockade; the governor launched the attempt alongside Brigadier Massé, who had arrived from Elvas. Upon being surprised by the besieging forces, a skirmish broke out between the reconnaissance cavalry and the grenadiers, during which the Count managed to enter the town.

== Siege ==
The Spanish began the siege by digging a line that was only a semicircle and did not completely incircle the city. The attack was concentrated between the Santa Cruz and São João bastions. The Spanish aimed a battery of 24 cannons and another of 4 cannons and 11 mortars at this spot. At the Santa Cruz bastion, the Portuguese held 2 cannon, 11 mortars and 2 bomb mortars, while at São João they had 3 pieces. To the right of the São João bastion, at the Bixa Torta bastion, there were 4 more cannons. In addition, the moat had been flooded by the population.

The artillery bombardment spread terror throughout the town and the women took refuge in the monasteries, but despite the severity of the attack, the defence was equally fierce and the rest of the population, the engineering and artillery officers and the governor remained in high spirits. As the artillery bombardment continued, Portuguese soldiers and guerrillas harassed the Spanish lines, carrying out cavalry sorties, raids and counter-mining operations.

A breach was eventually opened in the bastion of São João and on 25 October the Spanish prepared to storm through it, but the Portuguese lit on it a large fire that blocked the passage. On the 27th, 700 men in reinforcements commanded by the Count of Ericeira Luís Carlos Inácio Xavier de Meneses and General Paulo Caetano de Alburquerque entered Campo Maior after skirmishing with the besiegers.

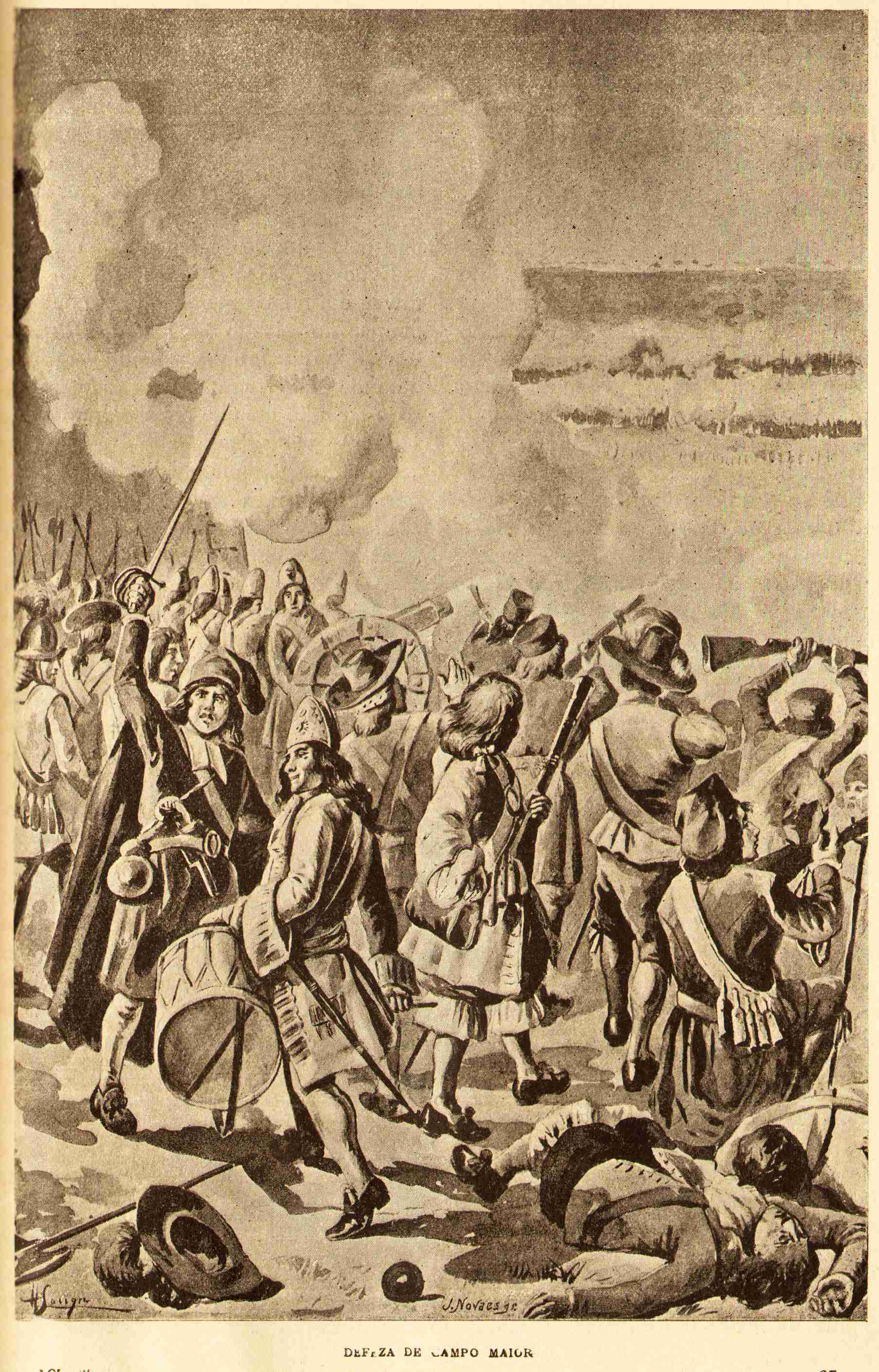
Portuguese defense of Campo Maior, early 20th century illustration.

The Spanish attempted to take Campo Maior by storm twice under the command of Lieutenant General Pedro de Zuñiga, but were repelled with heavy losses. The general then requested an armistice to recover the dead and wounded. Although the Spanish managed to breach the São João bastion and capitulation was imminent, the remarkable resistance of the defenders forced the Spanish to withdraw after a month due to exhaustion and lack of progress.

== Aftermath ==
King John V rewarded the defenders of Campo Maior with promotions and appointed the Count of Ribeira Grande as his ambassador to France. The successful defence of Campo Maior allowed peace negotiations to proceed without Portugal being at a disadvantage.
The history of the siege was well recorded by the governor of the stronghold himself, who counted, among other things, the number of defenders, attackers and even the ammunition expended by both sides, with 10,870 cannonballs, 1,309 bombs, 350 stone mortars and a large number of grenades having been fired at the stronghold.

== See also ==
- Portugal in the War of Spanish Succession
