= Siege of Badajoz (1705) =

- Part of War of the Spanish Succession
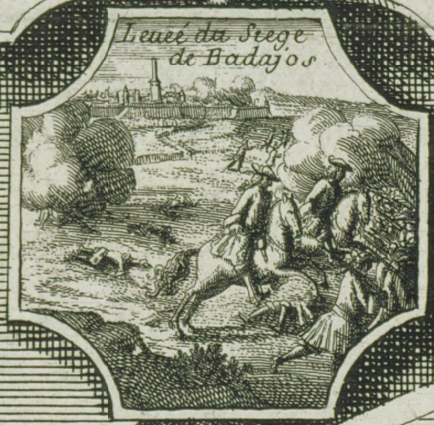
- Siege of Badajoz in 1705 (engraving in Almanach pour l'an de grace MDCCVI, 1706)
Date	4 October 1705 – 17 October 1705
Location	Badajoz, Crown of Castile, Spain
Result	Bourbon victory

Belligerents
France; Pro-Bourbon Spain	England; Dutch Republic; Austria; Portugal; Pro-Habsburg Spain

Commanders and leaders
(Spain) Lieutenant General Puebla (Kingdom of France) René de Froulay de Tessé	(Kingdom of England) Earl of Galway (Dutch Republic) François Nicolas Fagel

Strength
15,000 Garrison: (Spain) 1,000; Relief army: (Kingdom of France) 14,000	23,000 17,000 infantry 6,000 cavalry

The siege of Badajoz was a siege of the Spanish city of Badajoz in June and October 1705 during the War of the Spanish Succession. Both the June and October phases was conducted by an Anglo-Dutch force under Henri de Massue, Earl of Galway and François Nicolas Fagel on their advance into south-west Spain. However, the besiegers were forced to withdraw when cavalry reinforcements were sent by marshal René de Froulay de Tessé. The siege was renewed in October, but Galway lost an arm and Fagel again withdrew, meaning that the French were able to withdraw with all their guns. This failure caused Fagel to ask for his recall to the Netherlands.
