= Alexandre Maître, Marquis de Bay =

French military officer (1650–1715)

- Born: 1650; Salins, County of Burgundy, Holy Roman Empire
- Died: 14 November 1715 (aged 64–65); Badajoz, Spain
- Burial place: San Agustín Parish, Badajoz
- Military career
- Allegiance: Dutch Republic; Spain
- Conflicts: War of the Spanish Succession; Siege of Ciudad Rodrigo; Battle of La Gudina; Battle of Saragossa; Siege of Campo Maior
- Awards: Knight of the Golden Fleece

Alexandre Maître, Marquis de Bay (1650 – 14 November 1715) was a military officer in the service of Spain during the War of the Spanish Succession.

Born in Salins, County of Burgundy, Holy Roman Empire in 1650, Maître married Cécile de Wissenkercke, who had been born in Louvain on 7 September 1670. Maître was the seigneur of Laer, near Tirlemont. Between 1696 and 1701, he volunteered his service as a cavalry colonel with the Dutch Republic. In 1701, he offered his services to Philip V of Spain, and became general of cavalry serving in Flanders. He distinguished himself in the War of Spanish Succession, especially during the Battle of Ekeren on 30 June 1703, fighting alongside the duc de Villeroy, at the head of the cavalry and the dragoons.

On 23 July 1704 Philip V granted Maître the dignity of Marquis de Bay and Captain-General of Extremadura. He was at this time described as lieutenant general of Philip's armies and first lieutenant of his bodyguards. On the night of 14–15 December 1706 he captured Alcántara with 800 infantry and 200 cavalry. In June 1707 he seized a fort defending the bridge at Olivenza, then demolished the bridge. On 4 October he stormed Ciudad Rodrigo, capturing the city after three-quarters of an hour. For this victory he was created a Knight of the Golden Fleece by the King of Spain, a title gazetted in France on 10 December 1707, and was named Viceroy of Extremadura. Maître led the Spanish armies at the Battle of La Gudina on 7 May 1709, defeating a combined Anglo-Portuguese force, and commanded at the Battle of Saragossa on 20 August 1710. He suffered a severe defeat at Saragossa, and in October 1712 was forced to withdraw after an attempt to storm Campo Maior failed in the face of strong Portuguese resistance.

Maître died at Badajoz on 14 November 1715. He is buried in the Church of San Agustín and his tomb has a bas-relief with his portrait carved on it.
