= François Nicolas Fagel =

Dutch States Army officer (1655–1718)

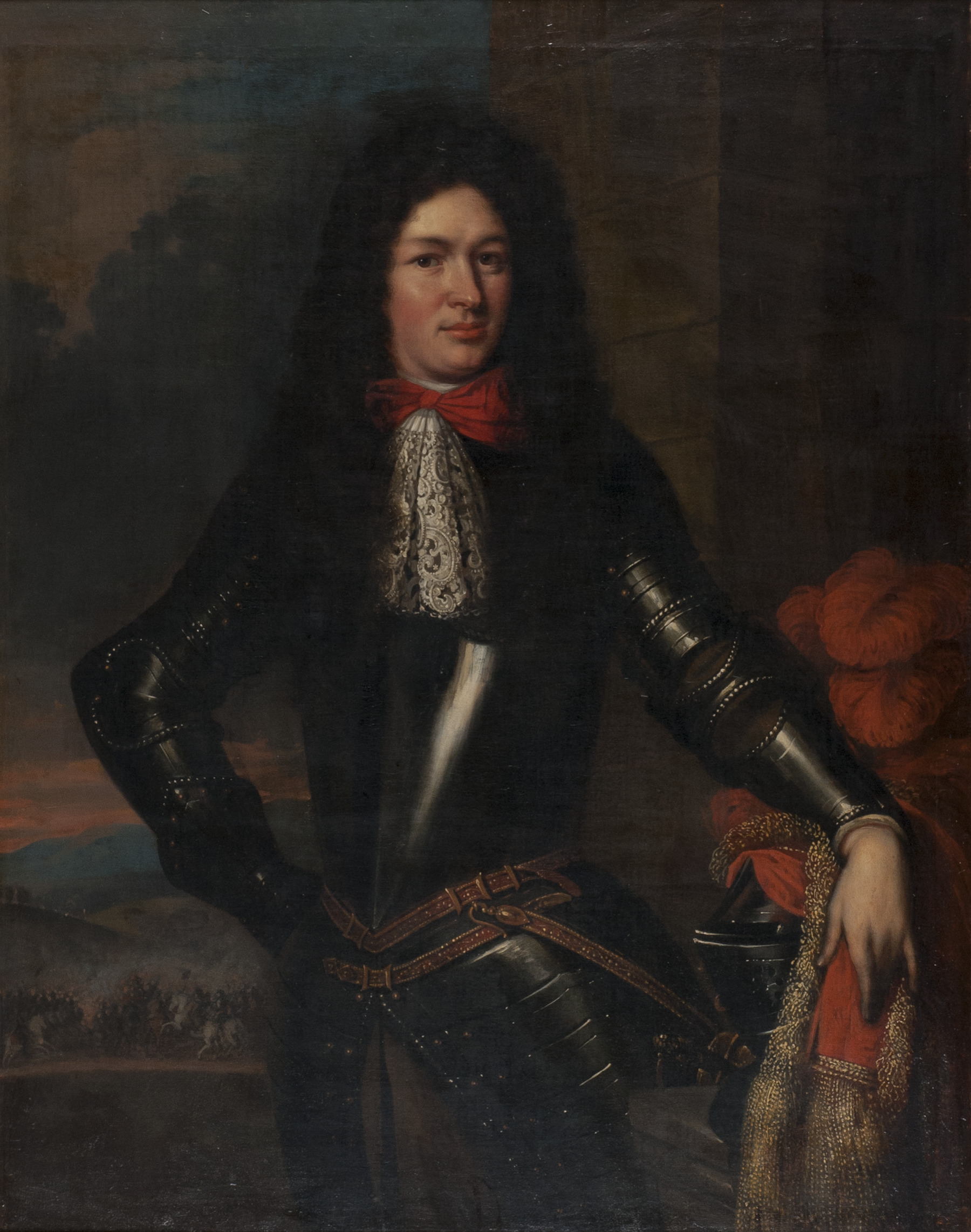
- Portrait by Johannes Vollevens, 1685–1689
- Born: 3 February 1655; Nijmegen, Dutch Republic
- Died: 23 February 1718 (aged 63); Sluis, Dutch Republic
- Military career
- Allegiance: Dutch Republic
- Branch: Dutch States Army
- Service years: 1672–1718
- Rank: Lieutenant general
- Conflicts: Franco-Dutch War; Siege of Maastricht (1673); Battle of Seneffe; Nine Years' War; Battle of Fleurus (1690); Siege of Mons (1691); Battle of Steenkerque; Battle of Landen; Siege of Namur (1695); War of the Spanish Succession; Assault on Nijmegen (1702); Siege of Venlo (1702); Capture of Liège (1702); Siege of Bonn (1703); Battle of Ekeren; Siege of Valencia de Alcántara; Siege of Albuquerque; Siege of Badajoz (1705); Battle of Ramillies; Siege of Ostend (1706); Siege of Menin (1706); Siege of Tournai (1709); Battle of Malplaquet; Siege of Béthune; Siege of Bouchain (1711); First Siege of Le Quesnoy (1712)

Lieutenant-General François Nicolas Baron Fagel (3 February 1655 – 23 February 1718) was a Dutch States Army officer. He was a nephew of Gaspar Fagel and took part in many battles during his career. As an infantry officer, he played an important role several battles, including the Battle of Landen, the Battle of Ekeren and the Battle of Malplaquet. From 1704 to 1705, Fagel commanded Allied forces in Portugal in concert with the English commander Henri de Massue, Earl of Galway. Fagel also was a siege expert and led the sieges of Béthune, Bouchain and Le Quesnoy in 1710, 1711 and 1712 respectively. He was the son of Nicolaas Fagel, mayor of Nijmegen, and Elisabeth Robbé.

== Franco-Dutch War and Nine Years' War ==
Fagel entered military service at a young age. He served as ensign at Maastricht since 1672; after the siege of that fortress a year later, the Prince of Waldeck promoted him to captain as a reward for his brave conduct. In the battle of Séneffe in 1674, where he was part of Prince Maurice's regiment, he was captured. William III of Orange, promoted him to lieutenant-colonel and captain of the Dutch Blue Guards and in 1679 to colonel of the Lavergne regiment, after participating in four campaigns.

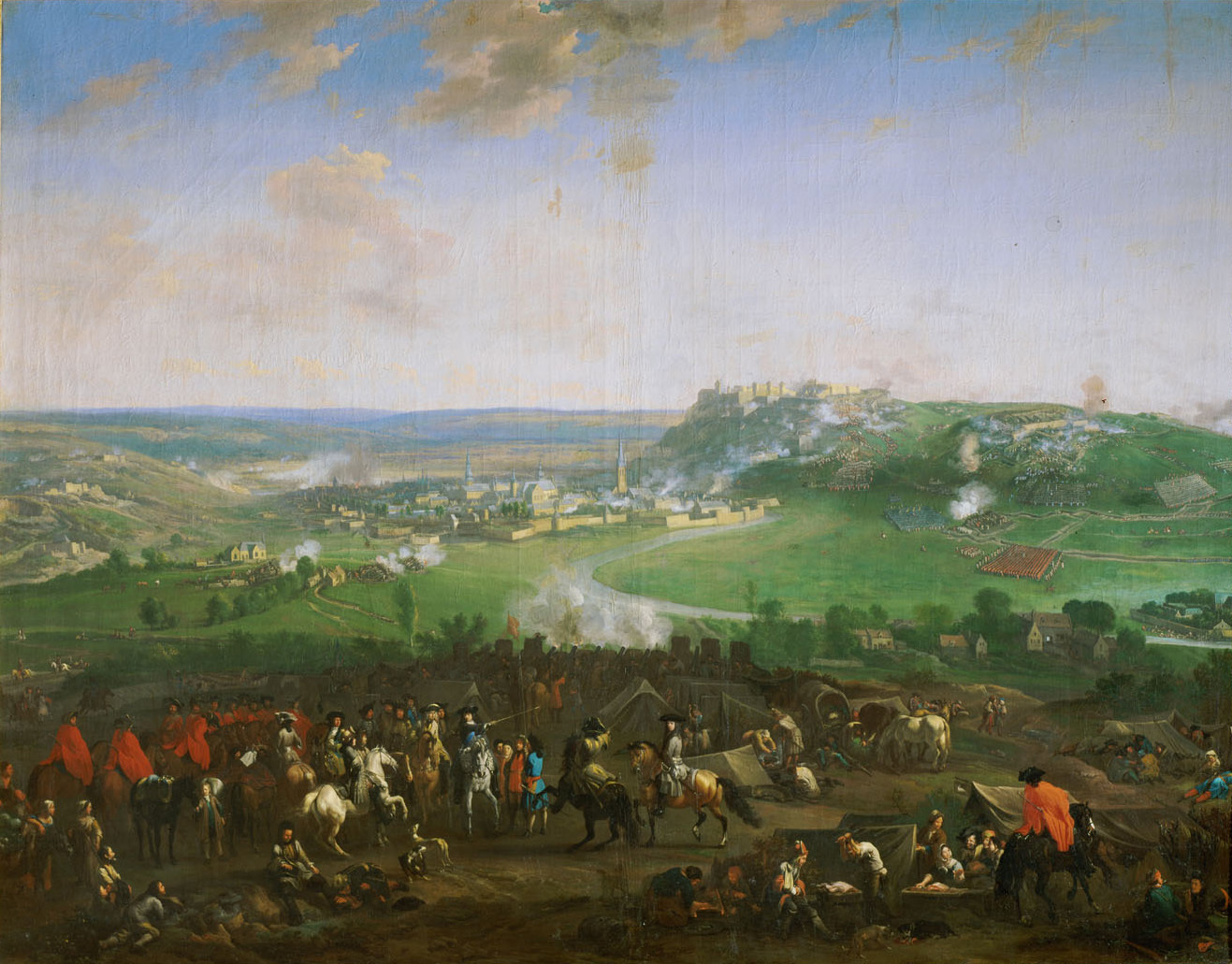
The Siege of Namur, 1695

Shortly before the expedition to England in 1688, he was promoted to brigadier. Later he served in Flanders and distinguished himself in the Battle of Fleurus. Fagel achieved greater fame in 1691 by defending Mons, under the supreme command of the Prince of Grimberghen, against close to 100,000 Frenchmen under Boufflers and Vauban; due to civilian pressure, the city was surrendered in spite of the strong resistance of the garrison. At Battle of Steenkerque, in 1692, Fagel commanded seven Dutch battalions; in the Battle of Landen he fought on the left wing and managed to drive back the enemy at Neerlanden with his troops, supported by Danish troops. Promoted to major-general by King William, he participated with great distinction in the Siege of Namur; with 3 Dutch regiments he was in charge of the attack on the works at the St. Nicolas Gate; during an attack by the French on the night of 12–13 July, Fagel was seriously injured.

== War of the Spanish Succession ==
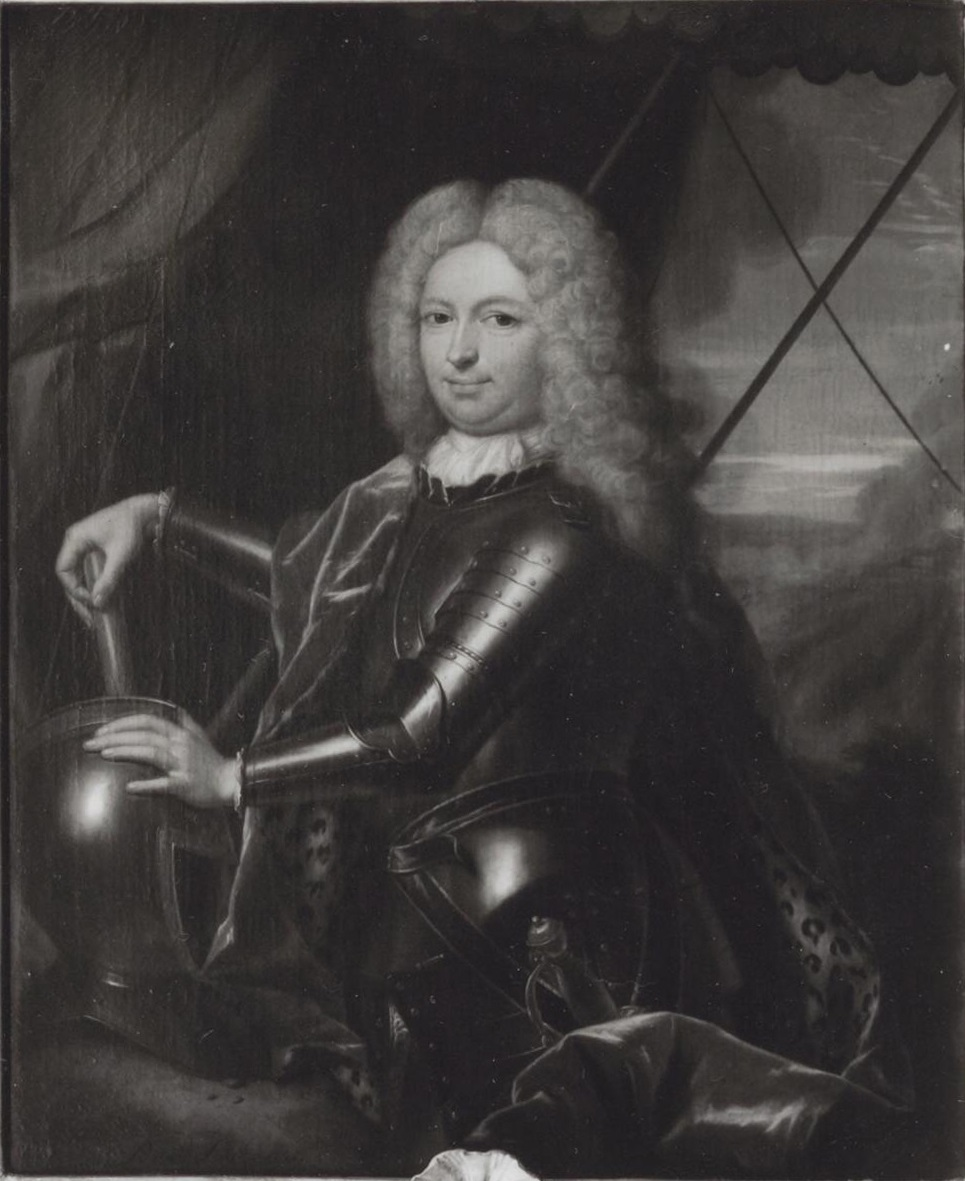
Portrait of Fagel, by Philip van Dijk

Promoted to lieutenant general shortly afterwards, he helped to save Nijmegen in 1702 under the Earl of Athlone. The same year he led the English storming of the covertway of Venlo, supported by Lottum's Prussian Troops which would later result in the capitulation of Venlo. At the storming of Liège, it was the Dutch, English and Prussian battalions, under Fagel and Somerfield, who decided the battle in favour of the Allies. At the Siege of Bonn under the leadership of Menno van Coehoorn, Fagel was one of the sub-commanders, with Obdam, Dedem and Pallandt. In the Battle of Ekeren, that same year, Fagel distinguished himself and was wounded twice.

In 1704 and 1705 he commanded the Dutch and English troops in Portugal as field marshal together with the Earl of Galway. They captured Valencia de Alcántara in May, soon followed by the capture of Albuquerque. Lack of support and co-operation, inexperienced troops, badly trained cavalry, opposition from the local population and pro-French Spanish statesmen forced him to abandon the Siege of Badajoz; regretting this, he asked to be recalled, but for the time being remained in Iberia. However, when in his opinion the leadership of the military operations became worse and worse, he left for the Dutch Republic in November 1705, after being elevated to grande by the king of Portugal.

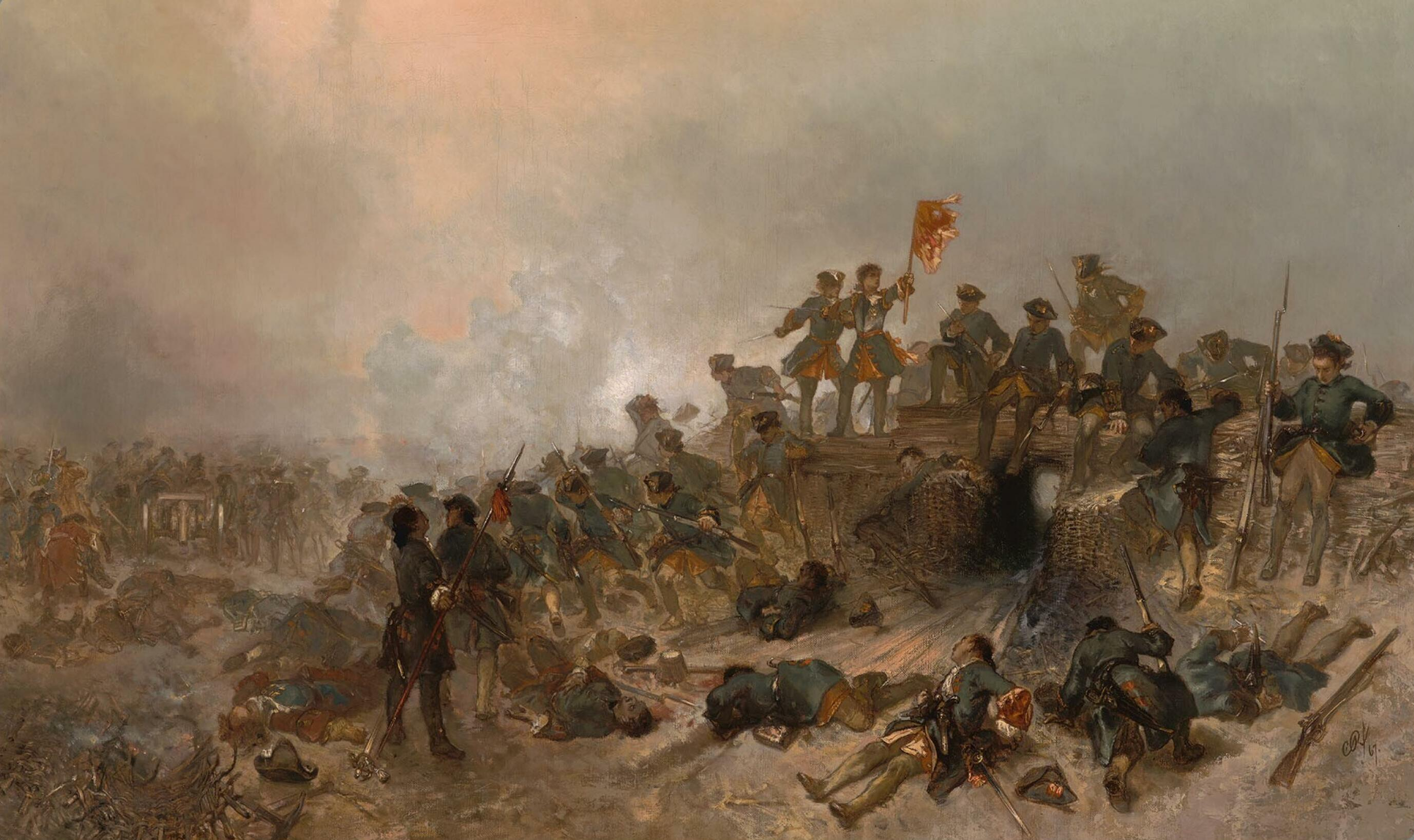
The Dutch assault at the Battle of Malplaquet

In 1706 he took part in the Battle of Ramillies and helped to capture Ostend under Hendrik van Nassau-Ouwerkerk. The next two years he commanded the Allied troops in Flanders. In 1709 he fought at the Battle of Malplaquet. During that battle he, together with the Prince of Orange, led the infamous Dutch assault which caused enormous casualties among them. He played an important role during the Siege of Tournai the same year and the Siege of Béthune a year later in collaboration with Prussian general Schulenburg, of whom Fagel was very jealous. At the Siege of Bouchain in 1711, Fagel enjoyed supreme command at the express command of the Duke of Marlborough. Marlborough refused any negotiations, so that Bouchain, which was under the command of de Ravignan, had to surrender on mercy or disfavour and its garrison thus became prisoners of war. Fagel seems to have thought more leniently about this, but in any case gained great fame by capturing this strong town within 23 days, despite the fact that the French were defending it excellently and a strong army was on its way to relieve it. In May 1712, he took up a fortified position along the Scheldt between Neuville and Hordain; after the peace of Utrecht, he was appointed governor of Sluis in 1713.

== Legacy ==
Fagel established himself as a respected and capable officer. Dutch historian Olaf van Nimwegen describes him as the “ideal type of the senior commander.” The eighteenth-century historian Jacobus de Kok offered the following assessment in 1786:

Love of the fatherland and a thirst for true glory; ever present in the hottest fire; knowledgeable in terrain; skilled in arranging attacks, establishing camps, and regulating lines of march; exceptionally competent in the siege of cities. [...] And as soldiers are accustomed to count the days until their turn to leave the trenches arrives, he visited them there three times a day … in order to encourage the men by his own example.

== Sources ==
Blok, P.J.; Molhuysen, P.C. (1912). "Fagel, François Nicolaas". Nieuw Nederlandsch biografisch woordenboek. Deel 1.
Dictionnaire Bouillet

- Van Nimwegen, Olaf (2020). De Veertigjarige Oorlog 1672–1712 (in Dutch). Prometheus. ISBN 978-90-446-3871-4.
