= Torre de Coelheiros =

- Civil parish
- Interactive map of Torre de Coelheiros
- Country: Portugal
- Region: Alentejo
- Intermunic. comm.: Alentejo Central
- District: Évora
- Municipality: Évora
- Time zone: UTC+00:00 (WET)
  - Summer (DST): UTC+01:00 (WEST)
- Website: torredecoelheiros.pt

Castle of Torre de Coelheiro

Torre de Coelheiros is a parish within the municipality of Évora, in the Alentejo region, with 226,24 km² and 539 inhabitants (2021). Its population density is 2,4 hab/km².

Former domain of the Cogominhos, the parish also known as Nossa Senhora do Rosário, was established in 1535, upon request by Nuno Fernandes Cogominho.

It lost most of its population to emigration in the 1960's and 1970's, especially to Switzerland.

Its main landmarks are the montado landscape, the Paço dos Cogominhos, the church of Nossa Senhora do Rosário and Pelourinho. Currently the parish of Torre de Coelheiros also encompasses the extinguished parishes of São Bento de Pomares, São Jordão e São Marcos da Abóbada. Outside the village lies also the abandoned churches of São Bento de Pomares and São Jordão.

== Population ==
População da freguesia de Torre de Coelheiros

Year	Pop.	±%
1864	1,054	—
1878	1,085	+2.9%
1890	962	−11.3%
1900	825	−14.2%
1911	1,471	+78.3%
1920	1,244	−15.4%

Year	Pop.	±%
1930	1,320	+6.1%
1940	1,955	+48.1%
1950	1,655	−15.3%
1960	1,478	−10.7%
1970	1,222	−17.3%
1981	862	−29.5%

Year	Pop.	±%
1991	957	+11.0%
2001	817	−14.6%
2011	715	−12.5%
2021	539	−24.6%

== Historic landmarks ==
- Anta da Herdade da Murteira
- Anta da Herdade da Tisnada
- Castelo de Torre de Coelheiros
