= Roman Temple of Évora =

Temple in Évora, Portugal

- Templo Romano de Évora
- An oblique view of the remnants of the Temple, in the centre of historic Évora
- Roman Temple of Évora
- 38°34′23.016″N 7°54′28.025″W
- Location: Évora, Alentejo Central, Alentejo
- Country: Portugal

History
- Dedication: Augustus, first emperor of Rome

Architecture
- Style: Roman
- Years built: 1st century A.D.

Specifications
- Length: 15 m (49 ft)
- Width: 25 m (82 ft)

UNESCO World Heritage Site
- Official name: Historic Centre of Évora
- Criteria: ii, iv
- Reference: 361
- Inscription: 1986 (10th Session)

Portuguese National Monument
- Type: Non-movable
- Criteria: National Monument
- Designated: 10 January 1907
- Reference no.: IPA.00002863

The Roman Temple of Évora (Portuguese: Templo romano de Évora), also referred to as the Templo de Diana (albeit wrongly, after Diana, the ancient Roman goddess of the moon, the hunt, and chastity) is an ancient temple in the Portuguese city of Évora (civil parish of Sé e São Pedro). The temple is part of the historical centre of the city, which was included in the classification by UNESCO as a World Heritage Site. It represents one of the most significant landmarks relating to the Roman and Lusitanian civilizations of Évora and in Portuguese territory.

== History ==
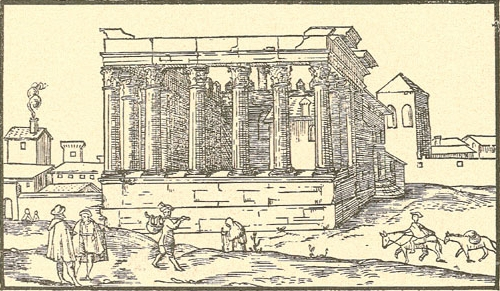
Woodcut of the Temple, showing its state possibly had in the 14th century.

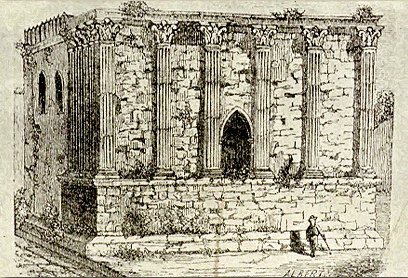
Sketch of the Temple, circa 1870, showing its state before restorations by Giuseppe Cinatti

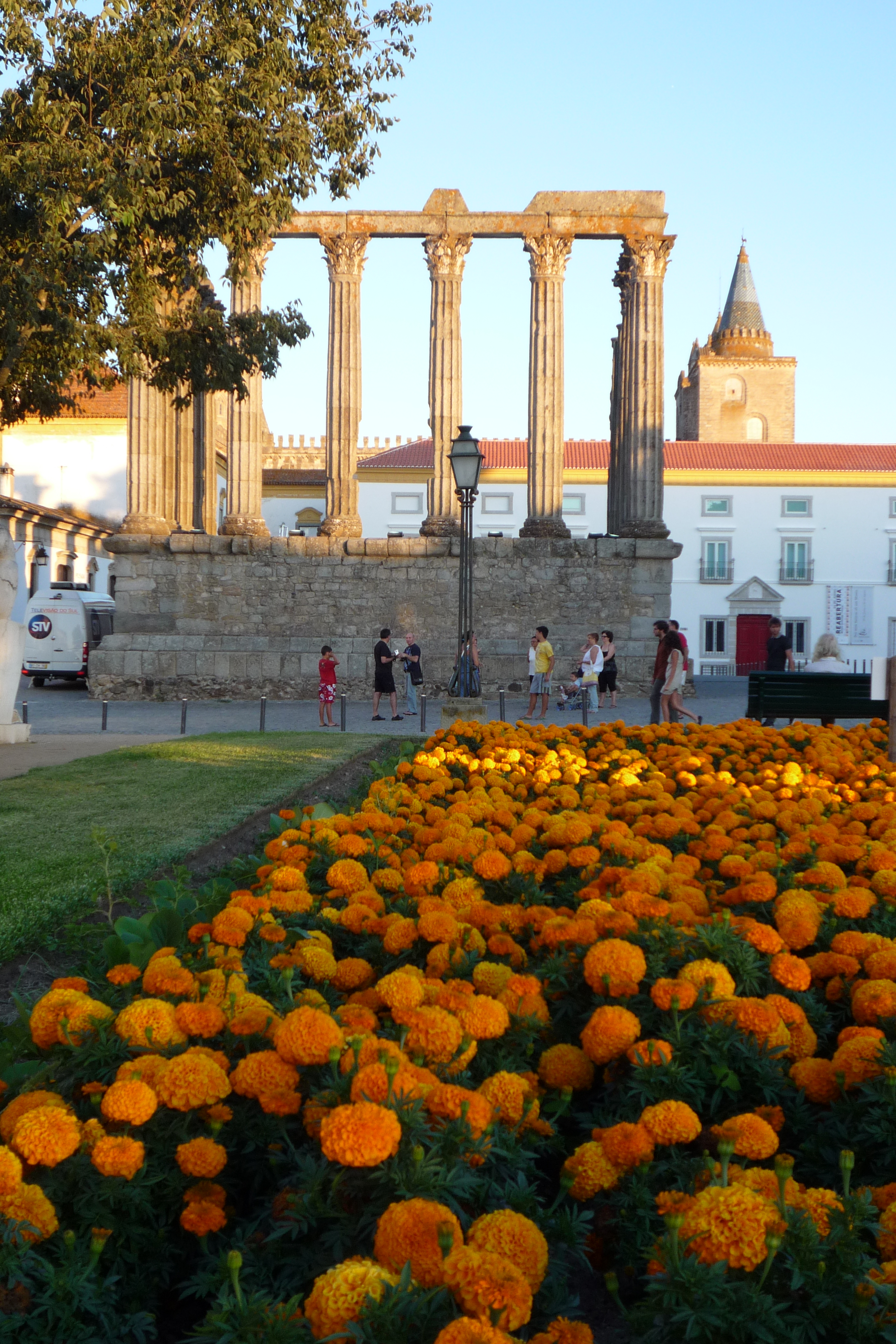
The manicured gardens of the historical square, with the Temple, the museum (formerly the Archbishop's palace) and the northern tower of the cathedral in the background

The temple is believed to have been constructed around the 1st century CE, in honour of Augustus, who was venerated as a god during and after his rule. The temple was built in the main public square (forum) of Évora, then called Liberalitas Iulia. During the 2nd and 3rd centuries, from the traditionally accepted chronology, the temple was part of a radical redefinition of the urban city, when religious veneration and administrative polity were oriented around the central space; the structure was modified around this time.

The temple was destroyed during the 5th century by invading Germanic peoples.

During the 14th century, the temple's space served as a stronghouse for the town's castle, while Fernão Lopes described the structure as being in shambles. In 1467, King Afonso V of Portugal authorized Soeiro Mendes to remove stones from the structure for building purposes and defense. The ruins of the temple were incorporated into a tower of the Castle of Évora during the Middle Ages. The base, columns and architraves of the temple were kept embedded in the walls of the medieval building; the temple-turned-tower was used as a butcher shop from the 14th century until 1836; this new use of the temple structure helped preserve its remains from complete destruction.

In the 16th-century Manueline foral ('charter'), the temple is represented, during a period when oral tradition suggested that the temple was attributed to Quintus Sertorius, the famous Lusitanian general (and perpetuated by paladins André de Resende and Mendes de Vasconcelos).

It was in the 17th century that references to the 'Temple of Diana', first made by Father Manuel Fialho, began to appear. Although the Roman temple of Évora is often called the Temple of Diana, any association with the Roman goddess of hunt stems not from archaeology but from a legend created in the 17th century by the Portuguese priest. Other interpretations suggest that it might have been dedicated to Jupiter, the Roman equivalent of Zeus.

The first reconstitution of the temple's appearance occurred in 1789 by James Murphy.

By the beginning of the 19th century, the structure still had the pyramidal merlons typical of the post-Reconquista Arabic structures around the colonnade. In 1836 it ceased being a butchershop.

In 1840, Cunha Rivara, then director of the Public Library of Évora, obtained the right to dispose of the buildings annexed to the monument from the Portuguese Inquisition, which were annexed to the northern façade of the temple. These structures were demolished, and the first great archaeological excavation was undertaken in Portugal. The resulting survey uncovered tanks of a primitive aqueduct. The stress on the space had begun to reach its limits by 1863, when the ceiling was partially destroyed; the tanks unearthed in the early excavation were also partially destroyed during expansion and landscaping of the main square.

By 1869, Augusto Filipe Simões proposed the urgent demolition of the medieval structures, defending the restoration of the primitive face of the Roman temple. Three years later, under the direction of Italian architect Giuseppe Cinatti, the vestiges of the medieval structures were finally removed, and a program of restoration was carried out in line with the Romantic thinking of the period.

On 1 June 1992, the Portuguese Institute of Architectural Patrimony (Portuguese: Instituto Português do Património Arquitectónico) became responsible for conservancy of the monument. Following a 13 September 1992 publication (DR176, 2ª Série, Declaração de rectificação de anúncio n.º281/2011), a public tender was issued for proposals relative the Roman temple and area surrounding it.

Between 1989 and 1994, new excavations in the vicinity of the temple were completed under the supervision of the German archeologist Theodor Hauschild.

== Architecture ==
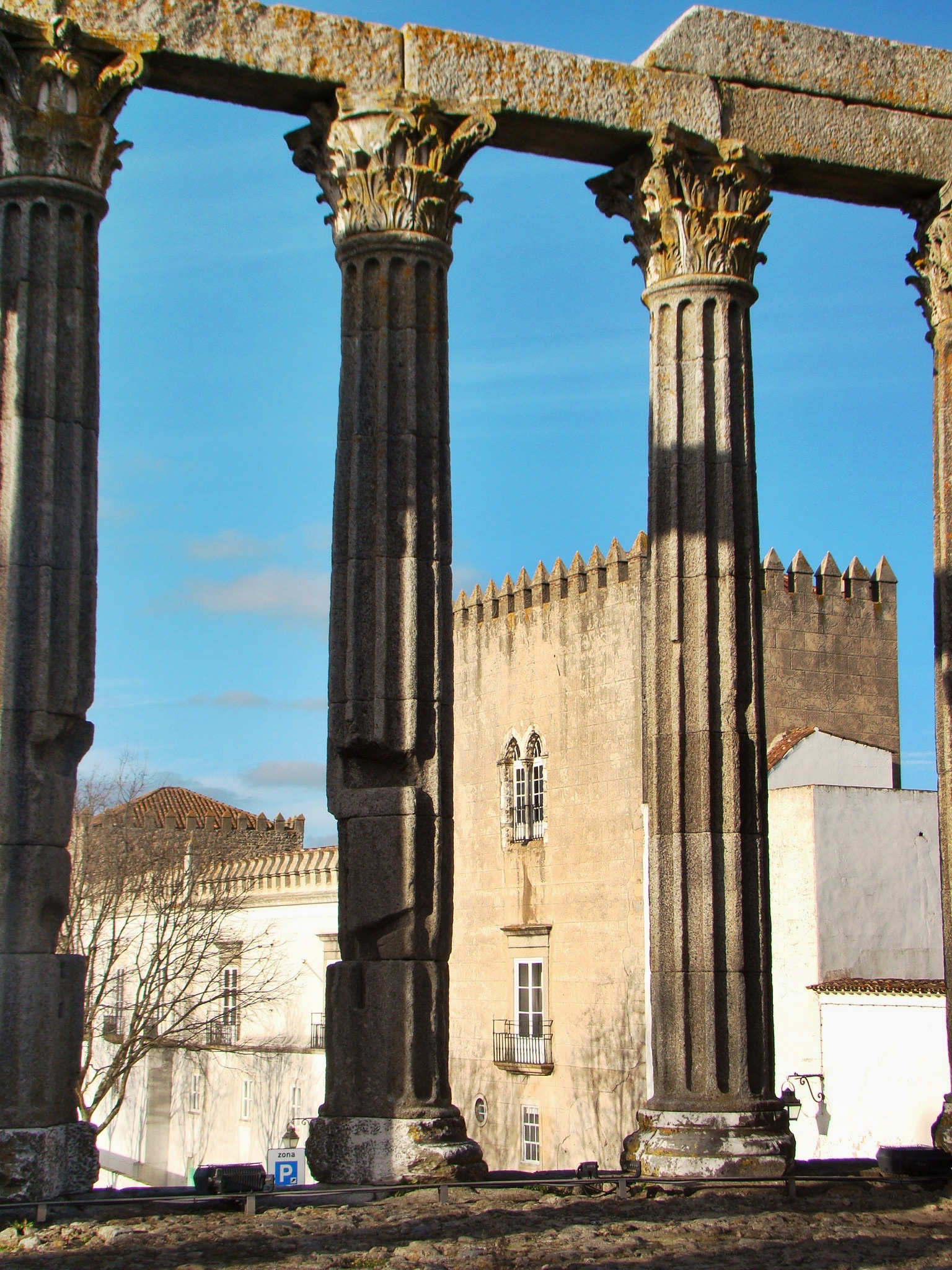
Detail of the temple's columns and Corinthian capitals

The temple is located in the central square of Évora, in what would have been the highest elevation of the city's acropolis. It is surrounded by religious buildings associated with the Inquisition in Portugal, including: the Sé Cathedral, the Palace of the Inquisitor, Palace of the Dukes of Cadaval, the Court of the Inquisition and, the Church and Lóios' Convent, as well as the Public Library and Museum of Évora.

The original temple was probably similar to the Maison Carrée in Nîmes (France). What remains of this structure is the complete base (or podium, made of regular and irregular granite blocks), marked by the ruins of a staircase, an intact colonnade along its northern facade (consisting of six columns) with architrave and frieze, four columns to the east with architrave and frieze and the western facade with three columns, without columns and one deconstructed base, along with architrave and frieze. The structure is oriented towards the south, evidenced by its ample staircase (a double lateral staircase design); further investigations by Hauschild suggest that the complex likely included a reflecting pool and monumental portico, in papers presented by the author at the Museum of Évora (in December 1993). The portico was originally hexastyle, six columns across.

The masonry platform is superimposed onto a granite base, with square corners and remnants of rounded surfaces: the podium is 25 metres long by 15 metres wide and 3.5 metres in height. The fluted shafts of the Corinthian columns, consisting of seven irregular barrel-shaped supports, range from 1.2 metres to 6.2 metres in height. They are stationed on circular white marble pedestals from Estremoz, directly over superior moulds, topped by carved three orders of capitals (also in marble) with decorated abacuses showing flower motifs (marigolds, sunflowers and roses). The rest of the entablature is constructed in granite masonry. It was originally surrounded by a reflecting pool traces of which have been found in late 20th century excavations.

There is an equilibrium and harmony between the granite and marble structure: its appearance, although considered one of the best preserved Roman ruins on the peninsula, was actually restored in the Romantic-style by Giuseppe Cinatti, following the then popular notions and theories of the time.

== See also ==
- List of Ancient Roman temples

== Gallery ==
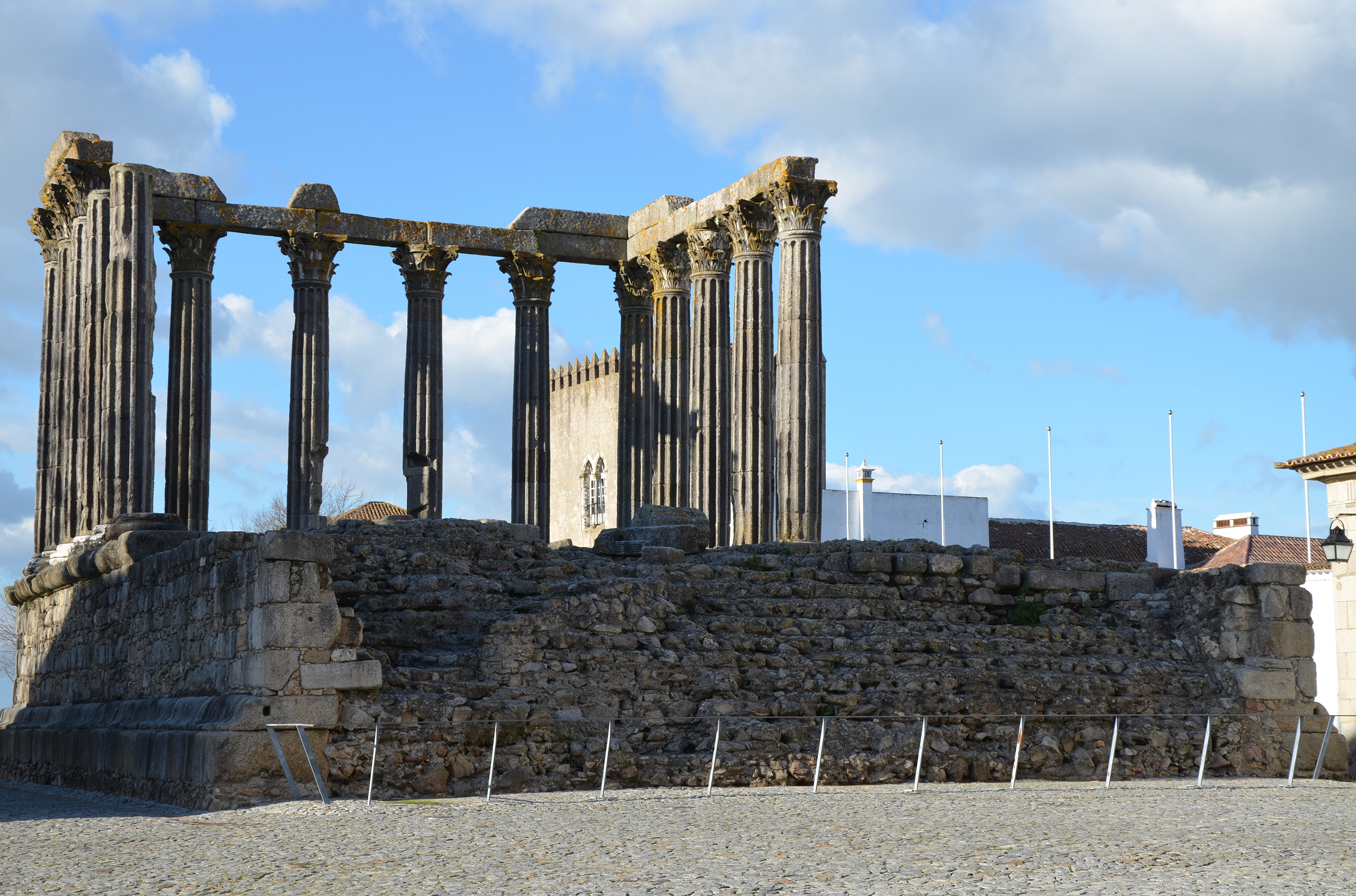
Colonnade and podium viewed from the south

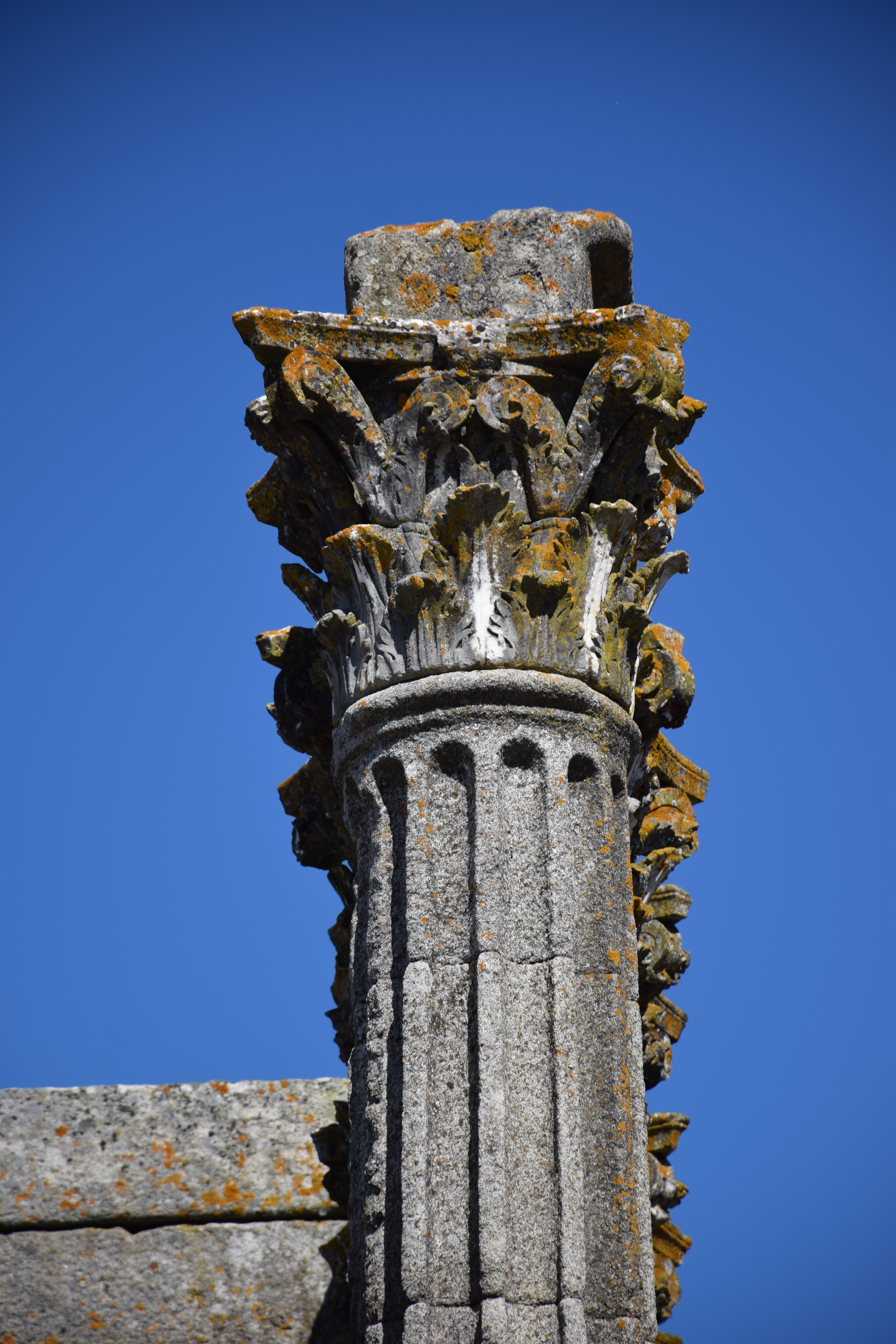
Corinthian capital and fluted granite shaft

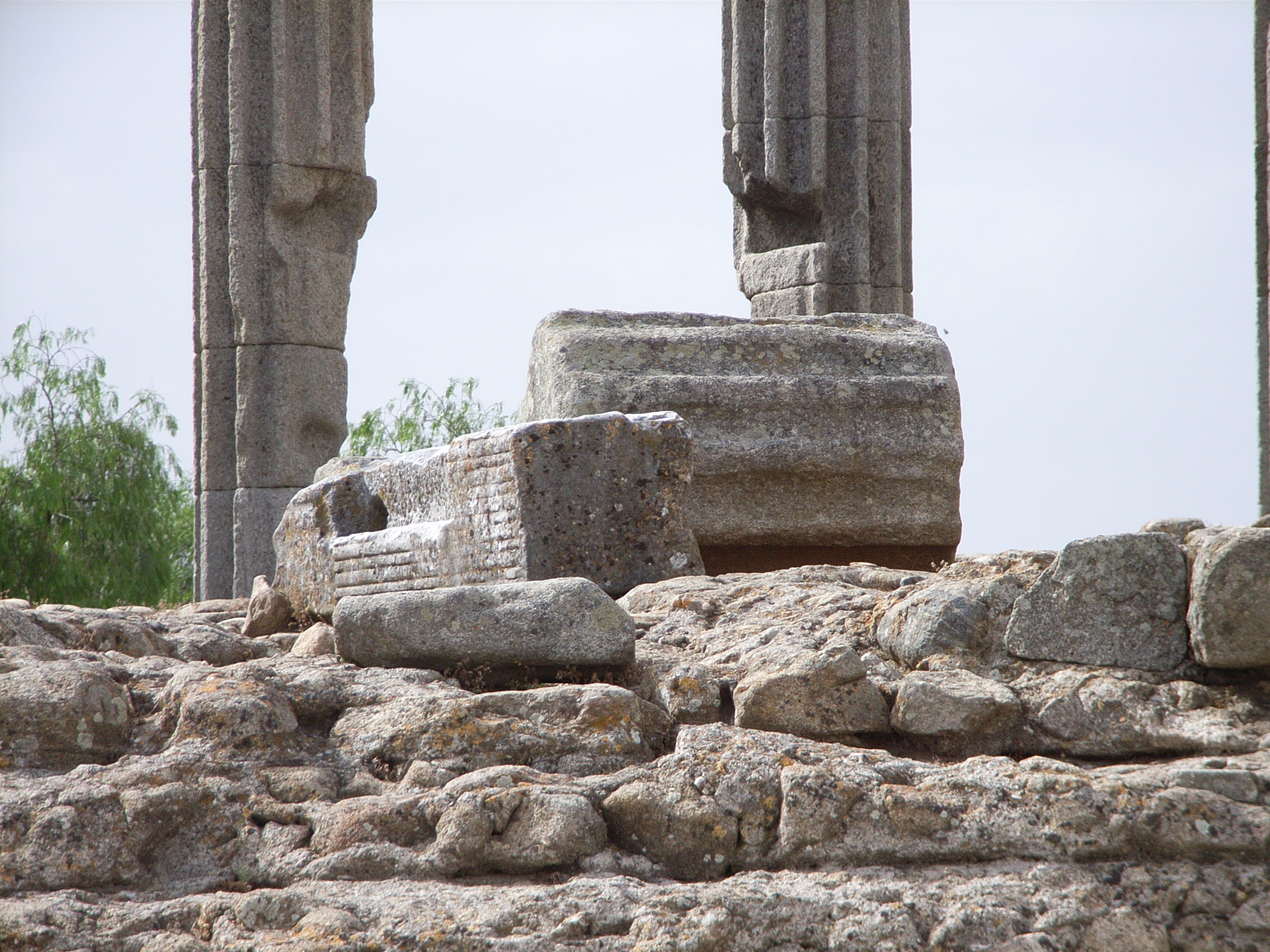
Column bases and architectural fragments on the podium

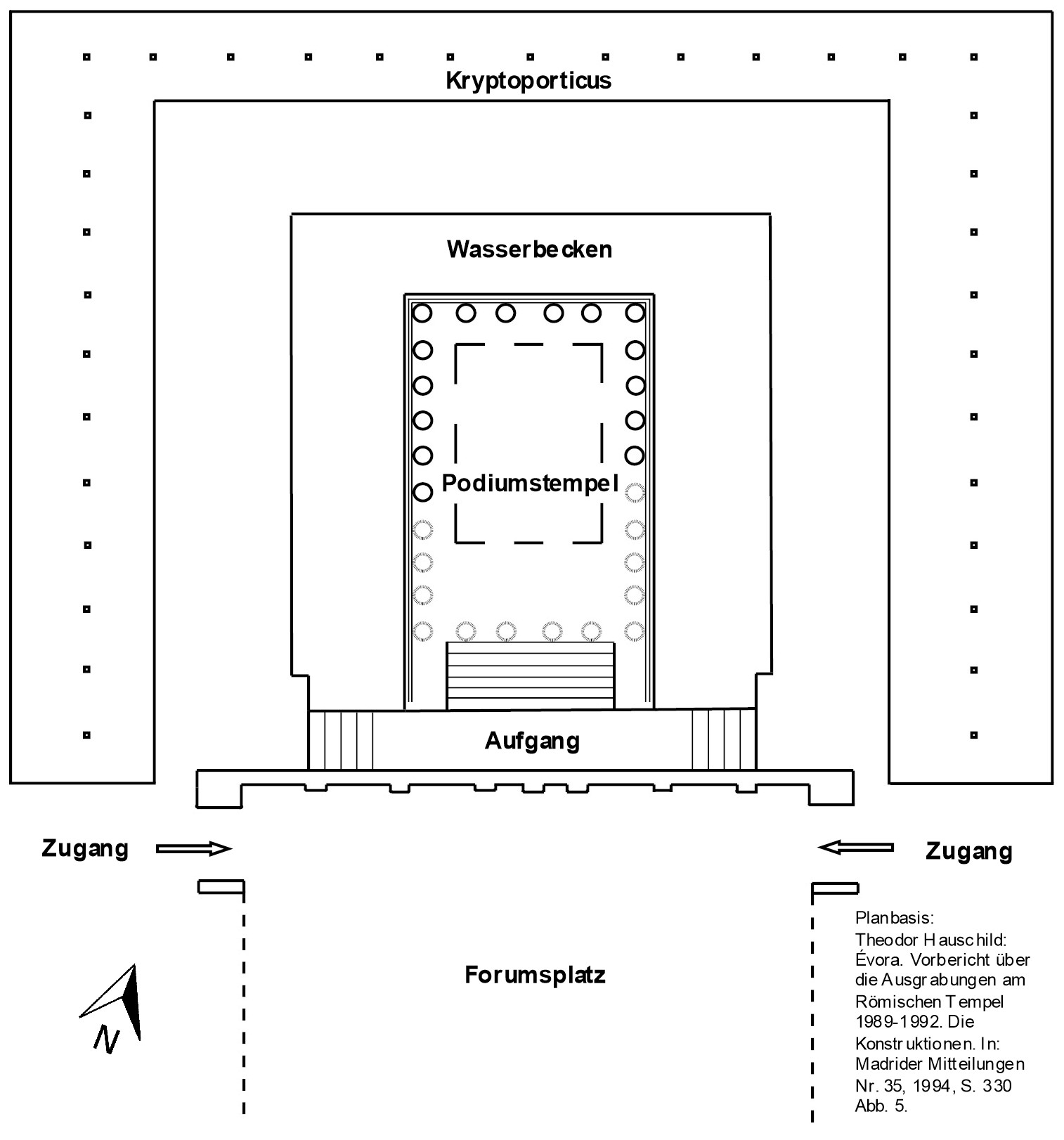
Plan showing the temple, surrounding water basin and portico

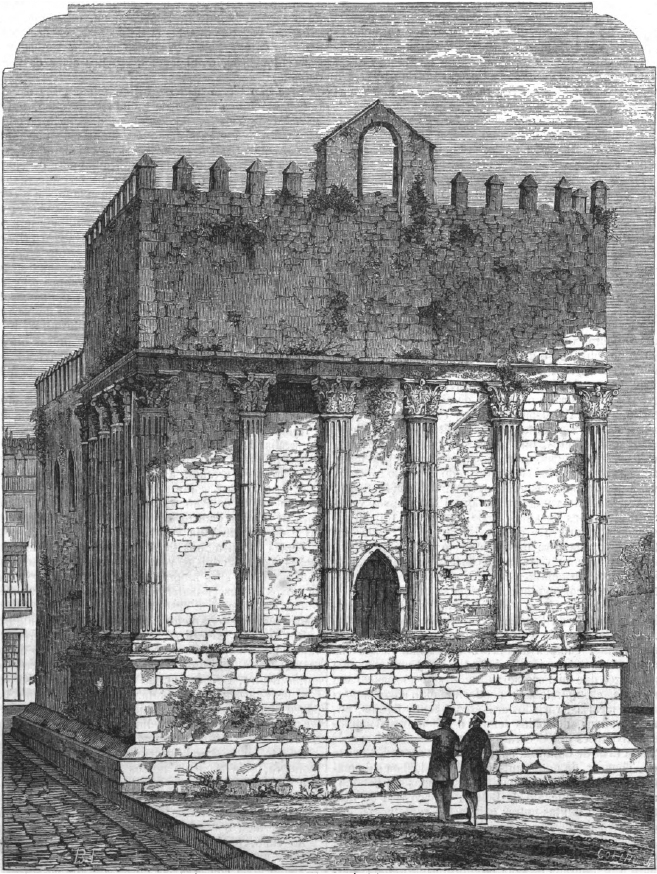
Engraving from 1865 showing the temple incorporated into a fortified building
