= Évora =

- Municipality
- Most Noble and Ever Loyal City of Évora
- Roman Temple of Évora, with Évora Cathedral (background right) and the Church of São João Evangelista (left)

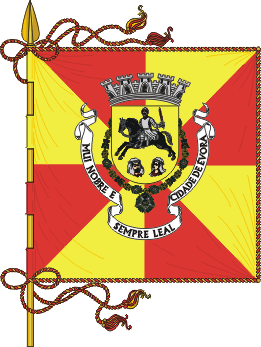
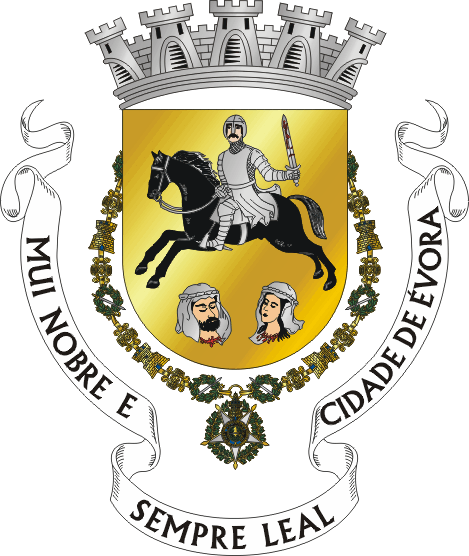
- Flag Coat of arms
- Interactive map of Évora
- Coordinates: 38°34′N 07°54′W
- Country: Portugal
- Region: Alentejo
- Intermunic. comm.: Alentejo Central
- District: Évora
- Seat: Évora Municipal Chamber
- Parishes: 12

Government
  - President: Carlos Zorrinho (PS)

Area
  - Total: 1,307.08 km^{2} (504.67 sq mi)

Population (2021)
  - Total: 53,591
  - Density: 41.001/km^{2} (106.19/sq mi)
- Time zone: UTC+00:00 (WET)
  - Summer (DST): UTC+01:00 (WEST)
- Local holiday: Saint Peter; 29 June
- Website: www.cm-evora.pt

UNESCO World Heritage Site
- Official name: Historic Centre of Évora
- Criteria: ii, iv
- Reference: 361
- Inscription: 1986 (10th Session)

Évora, (Note: US: /ˈɛvʊrə/ EV-uurr-ə, European Portuguese: [ˈɛvuɾɐ])) officially the Most Noble and Ever Loyal City of Évora, is a city and a municipality in Portugal. It has 53,591 inhabitants (2021), in an area of 1,307.08 square kilometers (504.67 mi^{2}). It is considered the historic capital of the Alentejo region and serves as the seat of the Évora District.

Due to its well-preserved old town centre, still partially enclosed by medieval walls, and many monuments dating from various historical periods, including a Roman Temple, Évora is a UNESCO World Heritage Site since 1986.

Due to its inland position, Évora is one of Portugal's hottest cities in the summer, frequently subject to heatwaves.

Évora is ranked number two in the Portuguese most livable cities survey of living conditions published yearly by Expresso. It was ranked first in a study concerning competitiveness of the 18 Portuguese district capitals, according to a 2006 study made by University of Minho economics researchers.

Along with Liepāja, Latvia, Évora was chosen to be the European Capital of Culture in 2027.

== History ==
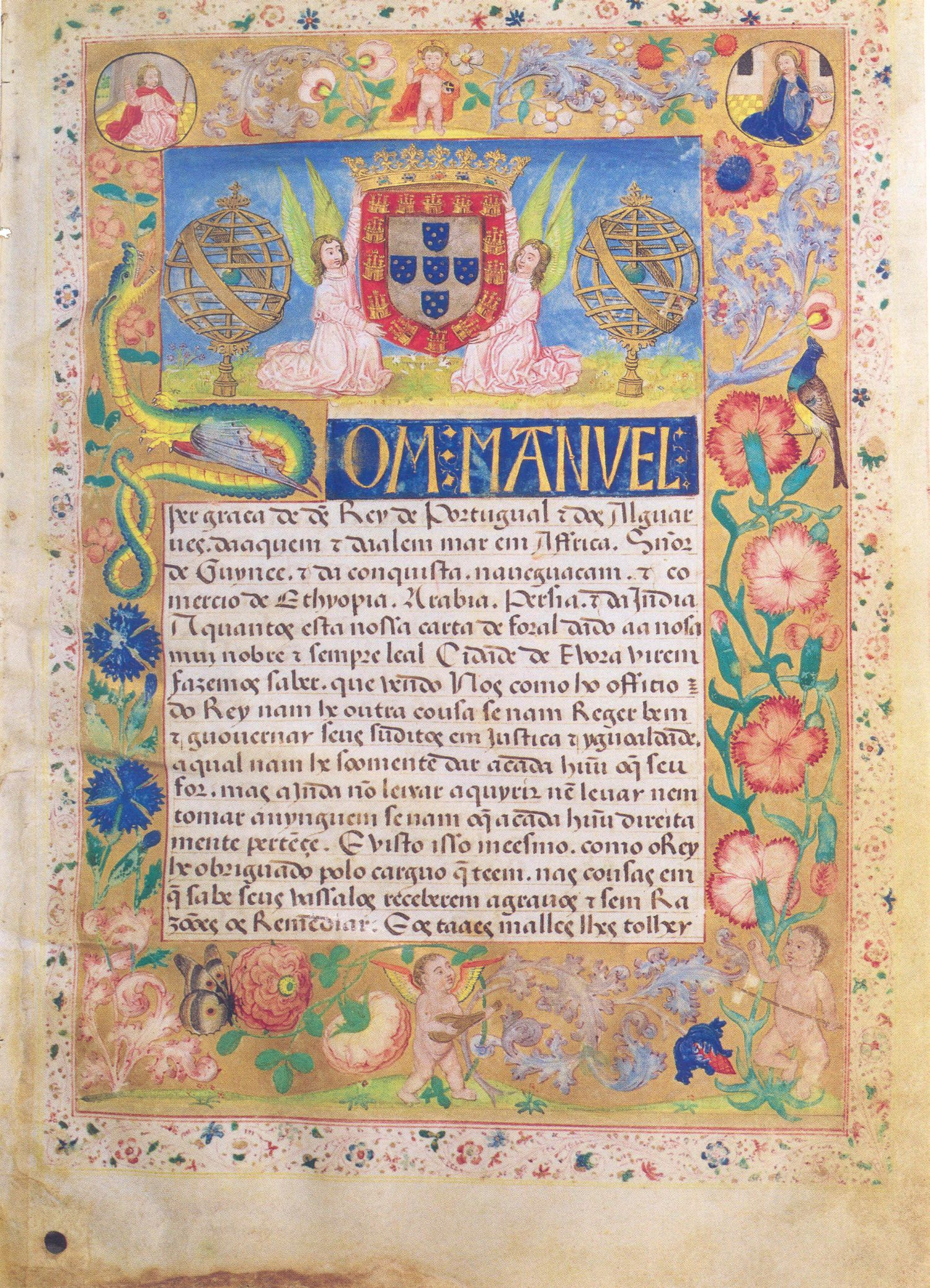
The Foral of Évora of 1501, when the city was favoured by Manuel I of Portugal.

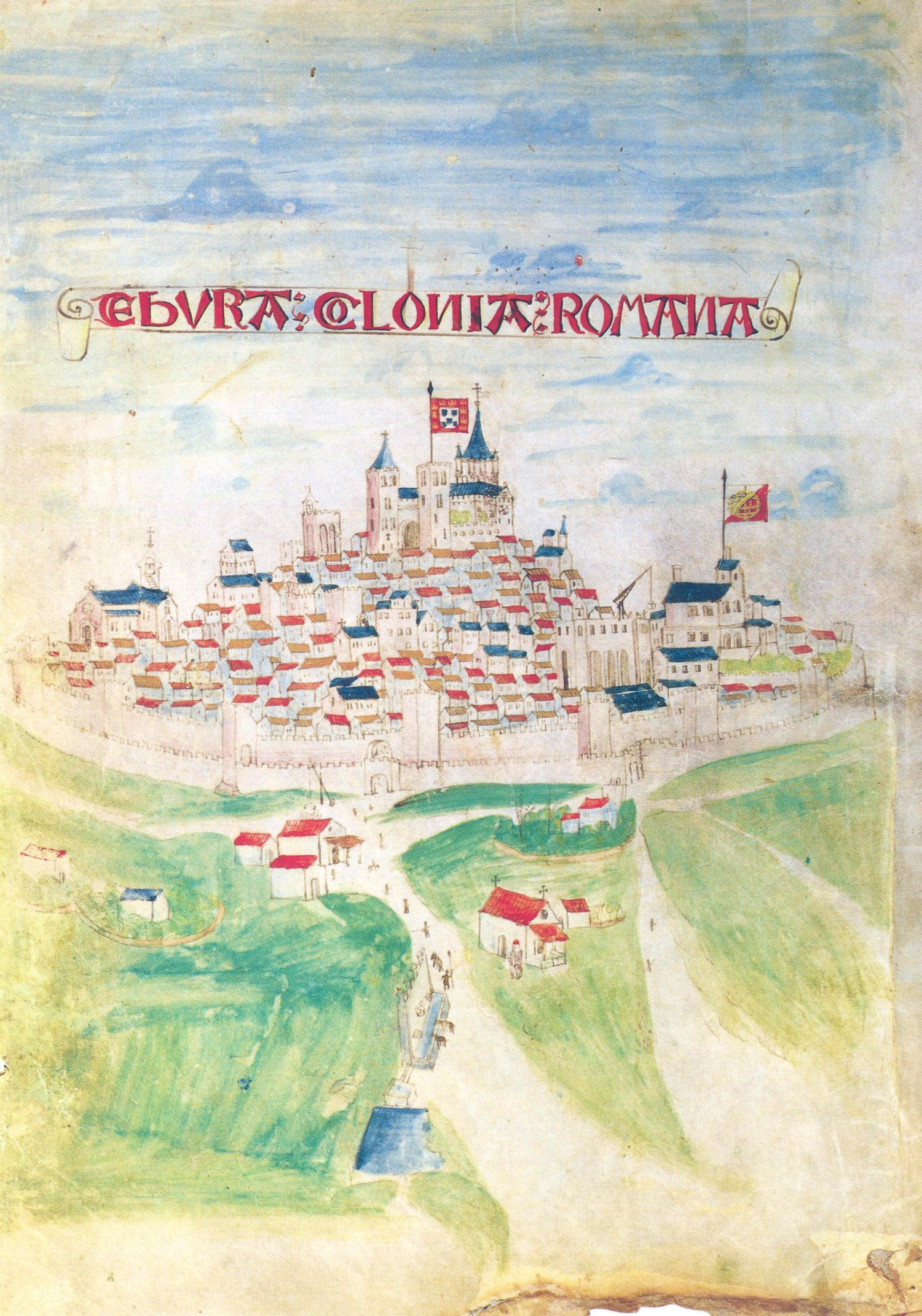
A depiction of Évora in 1503, when the city was blooming with Manueline riches.

=== Early history ===
Évora has a history dating back more than five millennia.

It was known as Ebora by the Celtici, a tribal confederacy, south of the Lusitanians (and of Tagus river), who made the town their regional capital.

The etymological origin of the name Ebora is from the ancient Celtic word ebora/ebura, the genitive plural form of the word eburos (yew), the name of a species of tree, so its name means "of the yew trees." The city of York, in northern England, at the time of the Roman Empire, was called Eboracum/Eburacum, after the ancient Celtic place name *Eborakon (Place of Yew Trees), so the old name of York is etymologically related to the city of Évora. Alternative hypotheses are that the name is derived from oro, aurum, (gold) as the Romans had extensive gold mining in Portugal; or it may have been named after ivory workers because ebur (genitive eboris) was Latin for ivory. It may have been capital of the kingdom of Astolpas.

=== Roman rule ===
See Ebora Liberalitas Julia for more on Roman Évora.

The Romans conquered the town in 57 BC and expanded it into a walled town. Vestiges from this period (city walls and ruins of Roman baths) remain. Julius Caesar called it Liberalitas Julia (Julian generosity). The city grew in importance because it lay at the junction of several important routes. During his travels through Gaul and Lusitania, Pliny the Elder also visited this town and mentioned it in his book Naturalis Historia as Ebora Cerealis, because of its many surrounding wheat fields. In those days, Évora became a flourishing city. Its high rank among municipalities in Roman Hispania is clearly shown by many inscriptions and coins. The monumental Corinthian temple in the centre of the town dates from the first century and was probably erected in honour of emperor Augustus. In the fourth century, the town had already a bishop, named Quintianus.

During the barbarian invasions, Évora came under the rule of the Visigothic king Leovigild in 584. The town was later raised to the status of a cathedral city. Nevertheless, this was a time of decline and very few artifacts from this period remain.

=== Arab Islamic rule ===
In 715, the city was conquered by the Arab under Tariq ibn-Ziyad and named it يابرة (Yāburah). During the Muslim rule (715–1165), the town, part of the Taifa of Badajoz, slowly began to prosper again and developed into an agricultural center with a fortress and a mosque. The Arab influence can still be observed in the character of the historical city. During that time, several notables hailed from Évora, including Abd al-Majid ibn Abdun Al-Yaburi عبد المجيد بن عبدون اليابري, a poet whose diwan still survives to this day.

=== Reconquest ===
Évora was wrested from the Moors through a surprise attack by Gerald the Fearless in September 1165. The town came under the rule of the Portuguese king Afonso I in 1166. That year, a new Order of Portuguese knights settled in the city to help defend it, but it was integrated into the Order of Calatrava because it was not authorized by the Pope. The last documented mention of a Muslim attempt to regain the city was in 1181 when Almohad forces briefly besieged the city for two days. It then flourished as one of the most dynamic cities in Portugal during the Middle Ages, especially in the 15th century. The court of the first and second dynasties resided here for long periods, constructing palaces, monuments, and religious buildings. Évora became the scene for many royal weddings and a site where many important decisions were made.

=== Manueline favour ===
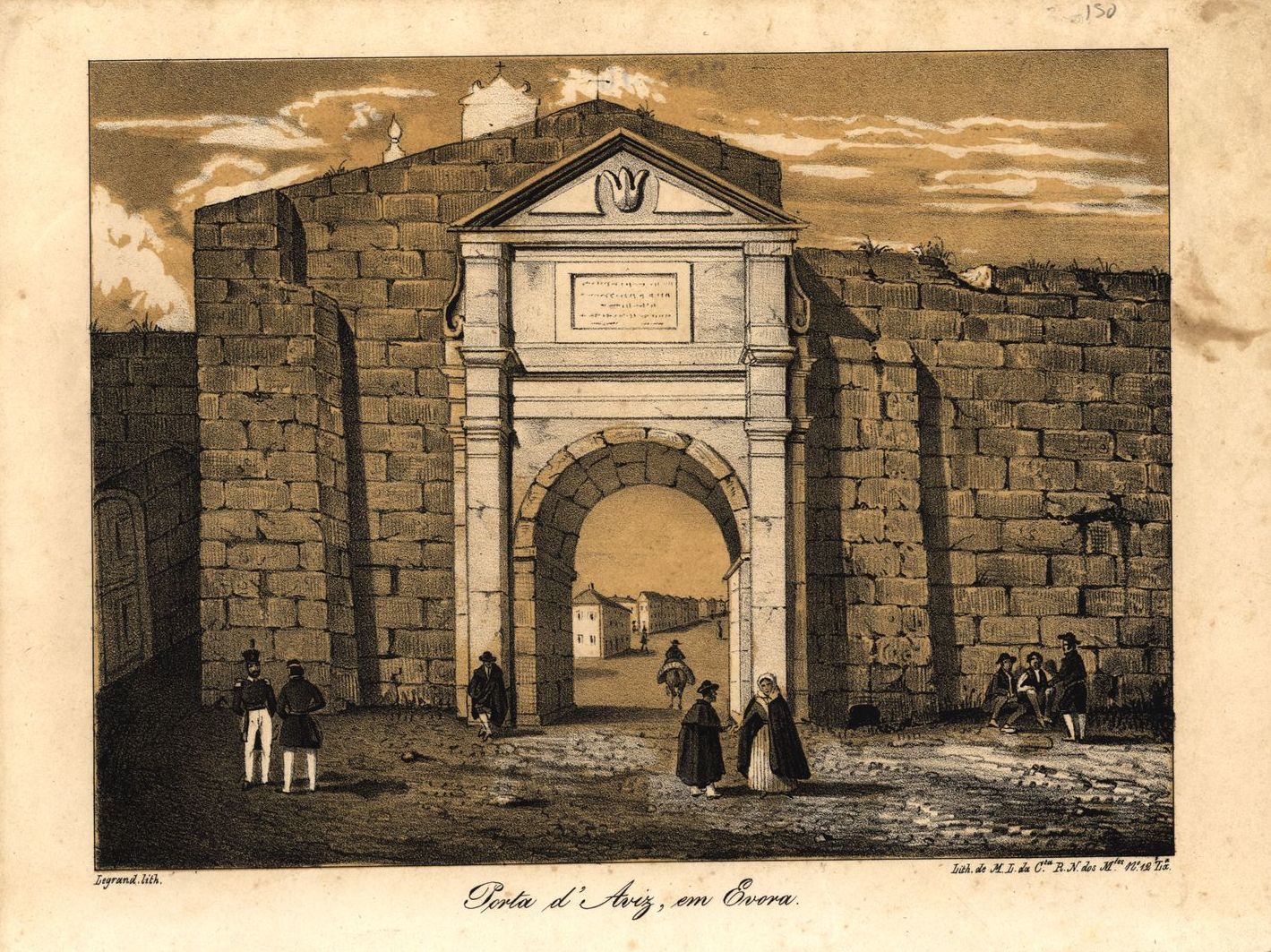
In the 19th century, Évora declined in national power, as a result of the War of Two Brothers.

Particularly thriving during the Avis Dynasty (1385–1580), especially under the reign of Manuel I and John III, Évora became a major centre for the humanities (André de Resende - buried in the cathedral) and artists, such as the sculptor Nicolau Chanterene; the painters Cristóvão de Figueiredo and Gregório Lopes; the composers Manuel Cardoso and Duarte Lobo; the chronicler Duarte Galvão; and the father of Portuguese drama, Gil Vicente.

Remnants of the famed Moorish rule remained in Évora. Nicolas Cleynaerts, a Flemish tutor at the Portuguese court, exclaimed in 1535 that "In Évora, it was as if I had been carried off to a city in hell: everywhere I only meet blacks."

The city became the seat of an archbishopric in 1540. The university was founded by the Jesuits in 1559, and it was here that great European Masters such as the Flemish humanists Clenardus (1493–1542), Johannes Vasaeus (Jan Was) (1511–1561) and the theologian Luis de Molina passed on their knowledge. In the 18th century, the Jesuits, who had spread intellectual and religious enlightenment since the 16th century, were expelled from Portugal, the university was closed in 1759 by the Marquis of Pombal, and Évora went into decline. The university was only reopened in 1973.

=== Recent history ===
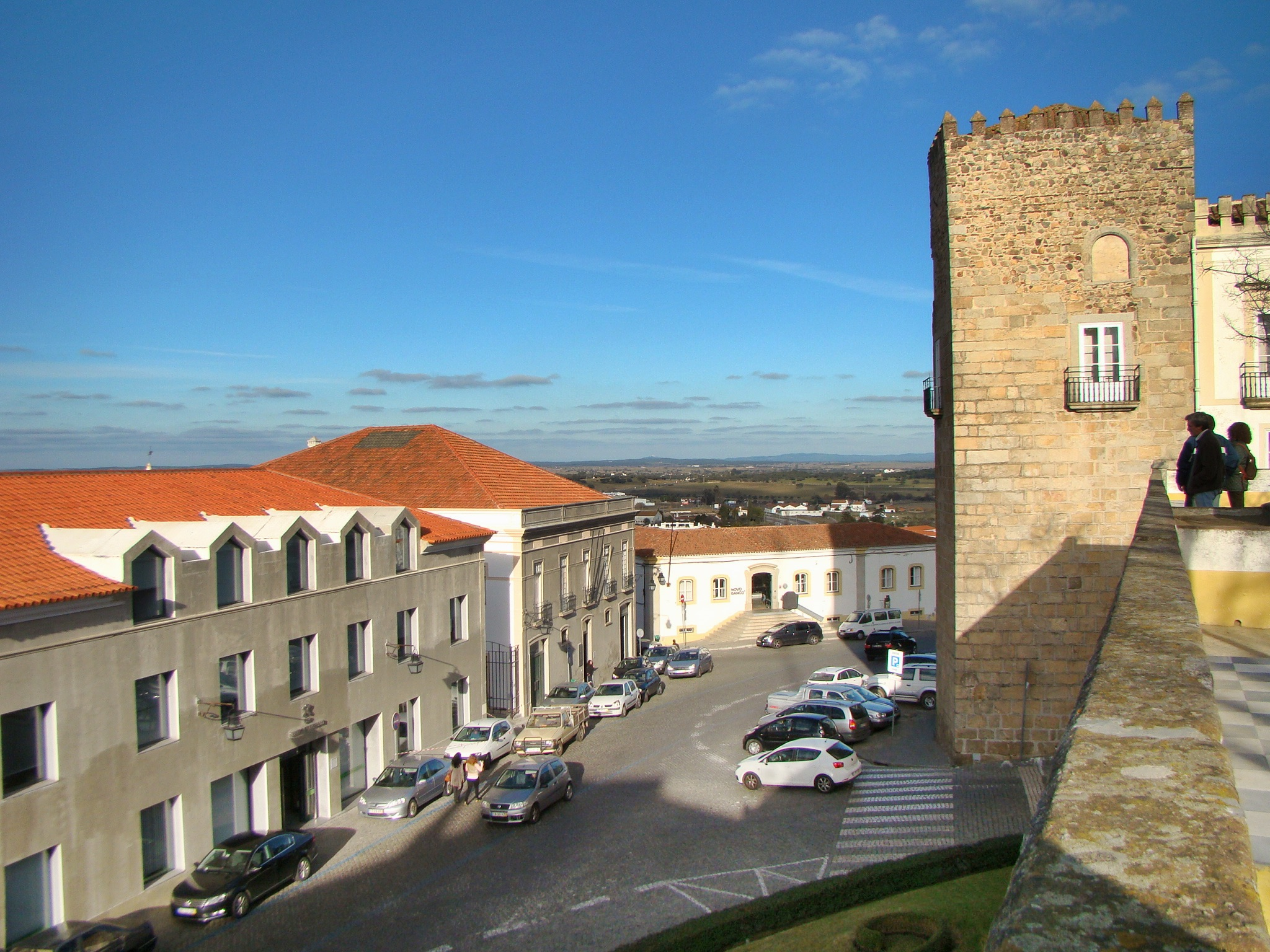
View of a street in Évora.

The Battle of Évora was fought on 29 July 1808 during the Peninsular War. An outnumbered Portuguese-Spanish force of 2,500, assisted by poorly armed peasant militiamen, tried to stop a French-Spanish division commanded by Louis Henri Loison but it was routed. Led by the hated Loison, known as Maneta or One-Hand, the French went on to storm the town which was defended by soldiers, militiamen, and armed townsmen. Breaking into the town, the attackers slaughtered combatants and non-combatants alike before thoroughly pillaging the place. The French invasion inflicted as many as 8,000 casualties while suffering only 290 of their own.

In 1834, Évora was the site of the surrender of the forces of King Miguel I, which marked the end of the Liberal Wars. The variety of architectural styles (Romanesque, Gothic, Manueline, Renaissance, Baroque), the palaces and the picturesque labyrinth of squares and narrow streets of the city centre are all part of the rich heritage of this museum-city.

In 1909, the city was damaged by an earthquake.

== Geography ==
=== Physical geography ===
Évora (altitude 300m) is situated in Alentejo, a large region of wide plains in the south of Portugal, bordered to the North by the Tagus River and to the South by the region of Algarve. The city is 140 km (87 mi) from the capital city Lisbon, and 80 km (50 mi) from Badajoz at the Spanish border. It is the chief city of the region.

The seat of the municipality is the city of Évora, composed by the civil parishes of Évora (São Mamede, Sé, São Pedro e Santo Antão) in the historical centre and the urban parishes of Bacelo e Senhora da Saúde and Malagueira e Horta das Figueiras outside the ancient city walls where most of the population in fact reside. The remaining civil parishes in the municipality are rural or suburban and do not form part of the city for statistical purposes. The city's historical centre has about 4,000 buildings and an area of 1.05 km^{2} (0.41 sq mi).

=== Climate ===
Évora has a hot-summer Mediterranean climate (Köppen: Csa) with hot, dry summers and mild, moist winters. Its location in the interior of southern Portugal makes it subject to frequent droughts and desertification. As is typical of the interior Alentejo, Évora is prone to severe heat extremes with an all-time record of 45.4 °C (113.7 °F). However, the average summer high is usually around 30 °C (86 °F), which is significantly less severe heat than the one found at more interior, lower altitude areas of the Iberian Peninsula. This is due to low-scale maritime effects caused by its relative proximity to the Atlantic Ocean, which also causes seasonal lag predominantly during the warmer period, with night-time temperatures being milder in September than June as well as in October compared with May. Frosts in winter are frequent but not usually severe, snow falling only about twice a decade.

Climate data for Évora, elevation: 247 m or 810 ft, 1991-2020 normals, extremes 1991-present
Month	Jan	Feb	Mar	Apr	May	Jun	Jul	Aug	Sep	Oct	Nov	Dec	Year
Record high °C (°F)	22.5 (72.5)	23.9 (75.0)	28.5 (83.3)	32.4 (90.3)	36.8 (98.2)	43.0 (109.4)	44.1 (111.4)	45.4 (113.7)	42.6 (108.7)	35.9 (96.6)	26.3 (79.3)	21.6 (70.9)	45.4 (113.7)
Mean daily maximum °C (°F)	14.1 (57.4)	15.7 (60.3)	18.7 (65.7)	20.7 (69.3)	25.0 (77.0)	30.2 (86.4)	33.3 (91.9)	33.5 (92.3)	29.5 (85.1)	24.1 (75.4)	17.6 (63.7)	14.6 (58.3)	23.1 (73.6)
Daily mean °C (°F)	9.3 (48.7)	10.3 (50.5)	12.7 (54.9)	14.6 (58.3)	18.0 (64.4)	22.0 (71.6)	24.5 (76.1)	24.7 (76.5)	22.1 (71.8)	18.2 (64.8)	12.8 (55.0)	10.0 (50.0)	16.6 (61.9)
Mean daily minimum °C (°F)	4.5 (40.1)	5.0 (41.0)	6.9 (44.4)	8.5 (47.3)	10.9 (51.6)	13.8 (56.8)	15.6 (60.1)	16.0 (60.8)	14.6 (58.3)	12.3 (54.1)	7.9 (46.2)	5.3 (41.5)	10.1 (50.2)
Record low °C (°F)	−4.2 (24.4)	−3.9 (25.0)	−2.7 (27.1)	1.8 (35.2)	2.9 (37.2)	6.7 (44.1)	9.5 (49.1)	9.3 (48.7)	7.6 (45.7)	3.1 (37.6)	−1.5 (29.3)	−4.2 (24.4)	−4.2 (24.4)
Average precipitation mm (inches)	68.6 (2.70)	52.3 (2.06)	60.8 (2.39)	62.1 (2.44)	46.6 (1.83)	10.6 (0.42)	2.7 (0.11)	6.0 (0.24)	33.9 (1.33)	81.5 (3.21)	86.0 (3.39)	85.1 (3.35)	596.1 (23.47)
Average precipitation days (≥ 1.0 mm)	8.6	7.0	7.5	8.0	6.0	1.7	0.6	0.7	3.6	7.7	8.8	8.7	68.9
Source: IPMA

Climate data for Évora (Nossa Senhora da Saúde), elevation: 309 m or 1,014 ft, 1981-2010 normals, extremes 1981-present
Month	Jan	Feb	Mar	Apr	May	Jun	Jul	Aug	Sep	Oct	Nov	Dec	Year
Record high °C (°F)	24.7 (76.5)	24.3 (75.7)	31.3 (88.3)	35.4 (95.7)	37.8 (100.0)	41.8 (107.2)	44.2 (111.6)	45.4 (113.7)	42.6 (108.7)	36.7 (98.1)	27.6 (81.7)	24.4 (75.9)	45.4 (113.7)
Mean daily maximum °C (°F)	13.4 (56.1)	14.7 (58.5)	18.0 (64.4)	19.1 (66.4)	22.6 (72.7)	27.9 (82.2)	31.1 (88.0)	31.1 (88.0)	27.8 (82.0)	22.2 (72.0)	17.1 (62.8)	13.8 (56.8)	21.6 (70.8)
Daily mean °C (°F)	9.6 (49.3)	10.7 (51.3)	13.3 (55.9)	14.3 (57.7)	17.1 (62.8)	21.4 (70.5)	23.9 (75.0)	24.1 (75.4)	21.9 (71.4)	17.7 (63.9)	13.4 (56.1)	10.5 (50.9)	16.5 (61.7)
Mean daily minimum °C (°F)	5.8 (42.4)	6.7 (44.1)	8.6 (47.5)	9.5 (49.1)	11.7 (53.1)	14.8 (58.6)	16.6 (61.9)	17.0 (62.6)	16.0 (60.8)	13.2 (55.8)	9.7 (49.5)	7.1 (44.8)	11.4 (52.5)
Record low °C (°F)	−2.9 (26.8)	−1.4 (29.5)	−2.3 (27.9)	2.9 (37.2)	4.9 (40.8)	6.7 (44.1)	10.9 (51.6)	11.4 (52.5)	9.1 (48.4)	5.5 (41.9)	0.0 (32.0)	−0.5 (31.1)	−2.9 (26.8)
Average precipitation mm (inches)	60.7 (2.39)	51.9 (2.04)	43.9 (1.73)	55.0 (2.17)	46.5 (1.83)	16.5 (0.65)	4.1 (0.16)	8.2 (0.32)	32.2 (1.27)	83.6 (3.29)	87.6 (3.45)	95.1 (3.74)	585.3 (23.04)
Source: IPMA

Climate data for Évora (Nossa Senhora da Saúde), elevation: 321 m or 1,053 ft, 1961-1990 normals and extremes
Month	Jan	Feb	Mar	Apr	May	Jun	Jul	Aug	Sep	Oct	Nov	Dec	Year
Record high °C (°F)	21.0 (69.8)	24.2 (75.6)	26.0 (78.8)	29.6 (85.3)	34.2 (93.6)	41.0 (105.8)	40.6 (105.1)	39.5 (103.1)	39.7 (103.5)	32.4 (90.3)	28.4 (83.1)	21.5 (70.7)	41.0 (105.8)
Mean daily maximum °C (°F)	12.8 (55.0)	13.7 (56.7)	15.9 (60.6)	17.8 (64.0)	21.6 (70.9)	26.2 (79.2)	30.0 (86.0)	30.2 (86.4)	27.4 (81.3)	21.7 (71.1)	16.3 (61.3)	13.1 (55.6)	20.6 (69.0)
Daily mean °C (°F)	9.4 (48.9)	10.2 (50.4)	11.8 (53.2)	13.4 (56.1)	16.3 (61.3)	20.1 (68.2)	23.0 (73.4)	23.2 (73.8)	21.6 (70.9)	17.3 (63.1)	12.7 (54.9)	9.9 (49.8)	15.7 (60.3)
Mean daily minimum °C (°F)	6.1 (43.0)	6.7 (44.1)	7.7 (45.9)	8.9 (48.0)	11.1 (52.0)	14.0 (57.2)	16.0 (60.8)	16.3 (61.3)	15.7 (60.3)	12.9 (55.2)	9.1 (48.4)	6.6 (43.9)	10.9 (51.7)
Record low °C (°F)	−2.9 (26.8)	−2.1 (28.2)	−0.8 (30.6)	2.0 (35.6)	4.9 (40.8)	6.7 (44.1)	9.8 (49.6)	11.0 (51.8)	7.6 (45.7)	4.0 (39.2)	0.6 (33.1)	−2.9 (26.8)	−2.9 (26.8)
Average precipitation mm (inches)	88 (3.5)	86 (3.4)	57 (2.2)	56 (2.2)	38 (1.5)	29 (1.1)	8 (0.3)	4 (0.2)	27 (1.1)	69 (2.7)	80 (3.1)	85 (3.3)	627 (24.6)
Average precipitation days (≥ 1.0 mm)	10	10	7	8	6	3	1	trace	3	7	9	9	73
Average relative humidity (%)	79	77	70	67	63	58	52	51	56	67	75	79	66
Mean monthly sunshine hours	148	148	203	220	285	301	363	346	251	204	158	144	2,771
Source: NOAA

Climate data for Évora (Mitra), 1941-1990, altitude: 200 m (660 ft)
Month	Jan	Feb	Mar	Apr	May	Jun	Jul	Aug	Sep	Oct	Nov	Dec	Year
Mean daily maximum °C (°F)	13.5 (56.3)	14.7 (58.5)	17.3 (63.1)	19.5 (67.1)	23.2 (73.8)	28.1 (82.6)	32.0 (89.6)	31.8 (89.2)	28.5 (83.3)	23.1 (73.6)	17.5 (63.5)	14.2 (57.6)	22.0 (71.5)
Daily mean °C (°F)	8.5 (47.3)	9.7 (49.5)	11.7 (53.1)	13.6 (56.5)	16.6 (61.9)	20.5 (68.9)	23.3 (73.9)	23.3 (73.9)	20.9 (69.6)	16.8 (62.2)	12.3 (54.1)	9.3 (48.7)	15.5 (60.0)
Mean daily minimum °C (°F)	3.4 (38.1)	4.6 (40.3)	6.0 (42.8)	7.6 (45.7)	9.9 (49.8)	12.8 (55.0)	14.6 (58.3)	14.7 (58.5)	13.3 (55.9)	10.5 (50.9)	7.0 (44.6)	4.3 (39.7)	9.1 (48.3)
Average rainy days (≥ 0.1 mm)	10.3	10.0	10.0	9.2	6.5	3.4	0.7	0.8	3.4	7.2	8.6	9.3	79.4
Source: Instituto de Meteorologia

Climate data for Évora (Currais), 1941-1990, altitude: 230 m (750 ft)
Month	Jan	Feb	Mar	Apr	May	Jun	Jul	Aug	Sep	Oct	Nov	Dec	Year
Mean daily maximum °C (°F)	13.5 (56.3)	14.7 (58.5)	17.3 (63.1)	19.8 (67.6)	23.6 (74.5)	28.8 (83.8)	32.6 (90.7)	32.3 (90.1)	29.2 (84.6)	23.3 (73.9)	17.7 (63.9)	14.1 (57.4)	22.2 (72.0)
Daily mean °C (°F)	8.6 (47.5)	9.5 (49.1)	11.5 (52.7)	13.5 (56.3)	16.5 (61.7)	20.8 (69.4)	23.6 (74.5)	23.4 (74.1)	21.4 (70.5)	17.1 (62.8)	12.4 (54.3)	9.2 (48.6)	15.6 (60.1)
Mean daily minimum °C (°F)	3.6 (38.5)	4.3 (39.7)	5.7 (42.3)	7.2 (45.0)	9.4 (48.9)	12.7 (54.9)	14.5 (58.1)	14.4 (57.9)	13.5 (56.3)	10.9 (51.6)	7.1 (44.8)	4.3 (39.7)	9.0 (48.1)
Average rainfall mm (inches)	79.2 (3.12)	67.2 (2.65)	65.3 (2.57)	49.2 (1.94)	39.8 (1.57)	20.2 (0.80)	4.3 (0.17)	3.9 (0.15)	22.4 (0.88)	57.4 (2.26)	70.8 (2.79)	79.9 (3.15)	559.6 (22.05)
Average rainy days (≥ 0.1 mm)	13.5	11.9	11.2	9.1	6.9	3.8	0.8	0.7	3.4	8.1	10.3	12.7	92.4
Source: Instituto de Meteorologia

=== Human geography ===
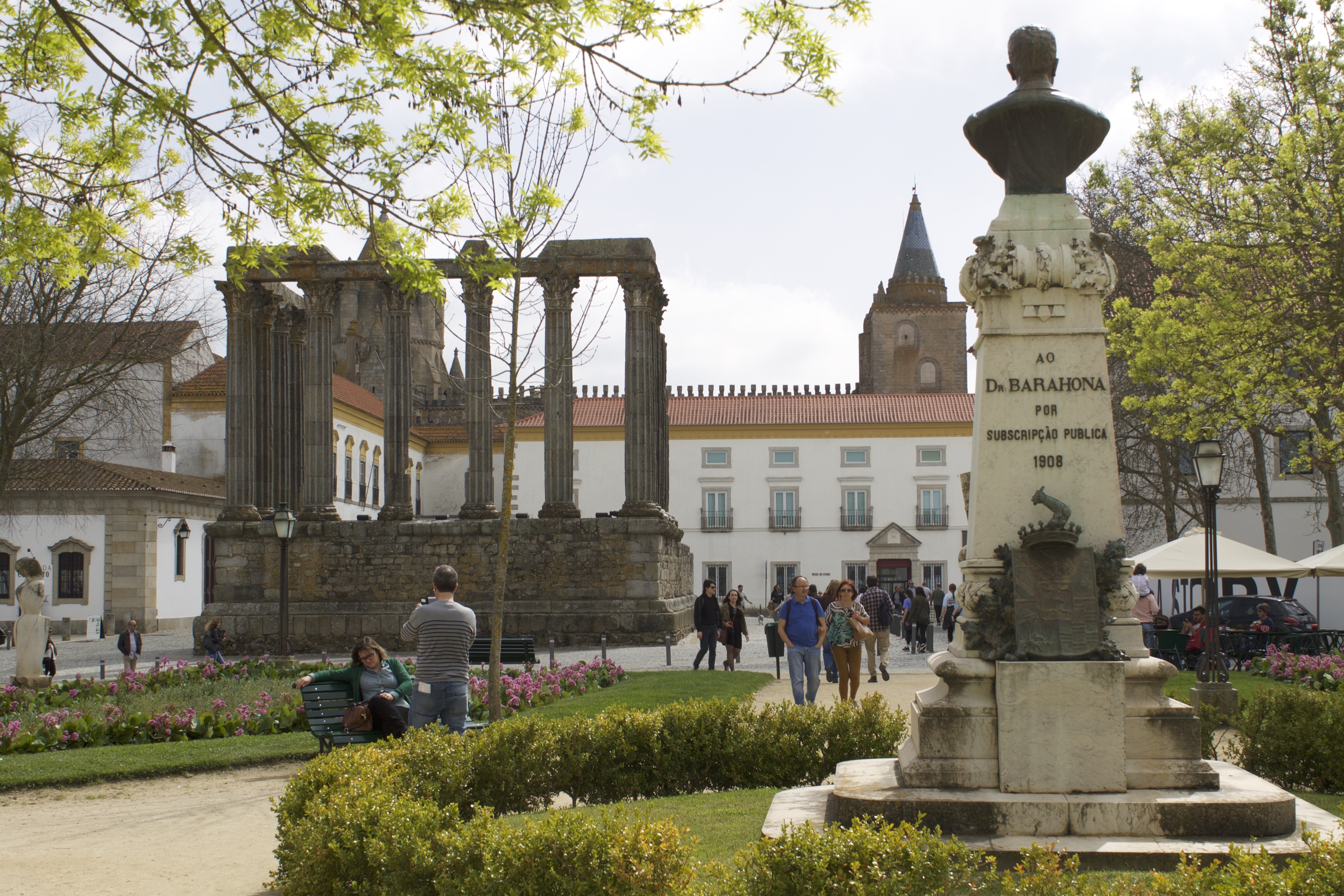
Jardim Diana, downtown Évora

Évora is a pleasant medium-sized city and has numerous monuments. Due to its long history, monuments and buildings are its main attraction to outsiders. However, there are numerous "Festas Populares" celebrating saints, holidays, "Feiras" (fairs) and cultural events (such as televised musical presentations) sponsored by the municipality and other organizations

The present Mayor is Carlos Zorrinho of the Socialist Party. The municipal holiday is 29 June. The municipality consists of the following 12 civil parishes:

- Bacelo e Senhora da Saúde
- Canaviais
- Évora (São Mamede, Sé, São Pedro e Santo Antão)
- Malagueira e Horta das Figueiras
- Nossa Senhora da Graça do Divor
- Nossa Senhora da Tourega e Nossa Senhora de Guadalupe
- Nossa Senhora de Machede
- São Bento do Mato
- São Manços e São Vicente do Pigeiro
- São Miguel de Machede
- São Sebastião da Giesteira e Nossa Senhora da Boa Fé
- Torre de Coelheiros

== International relations ==
Évora is twinned with:

- Angra do Heroísmo, Portugal, since 1986
- Chartres, France, since 2003
- Qazvin, Iran, since 2016
- Island of Mozambique, Mozambique, since 1997
- Suzdal, Russia, since 1986

== Economy ==
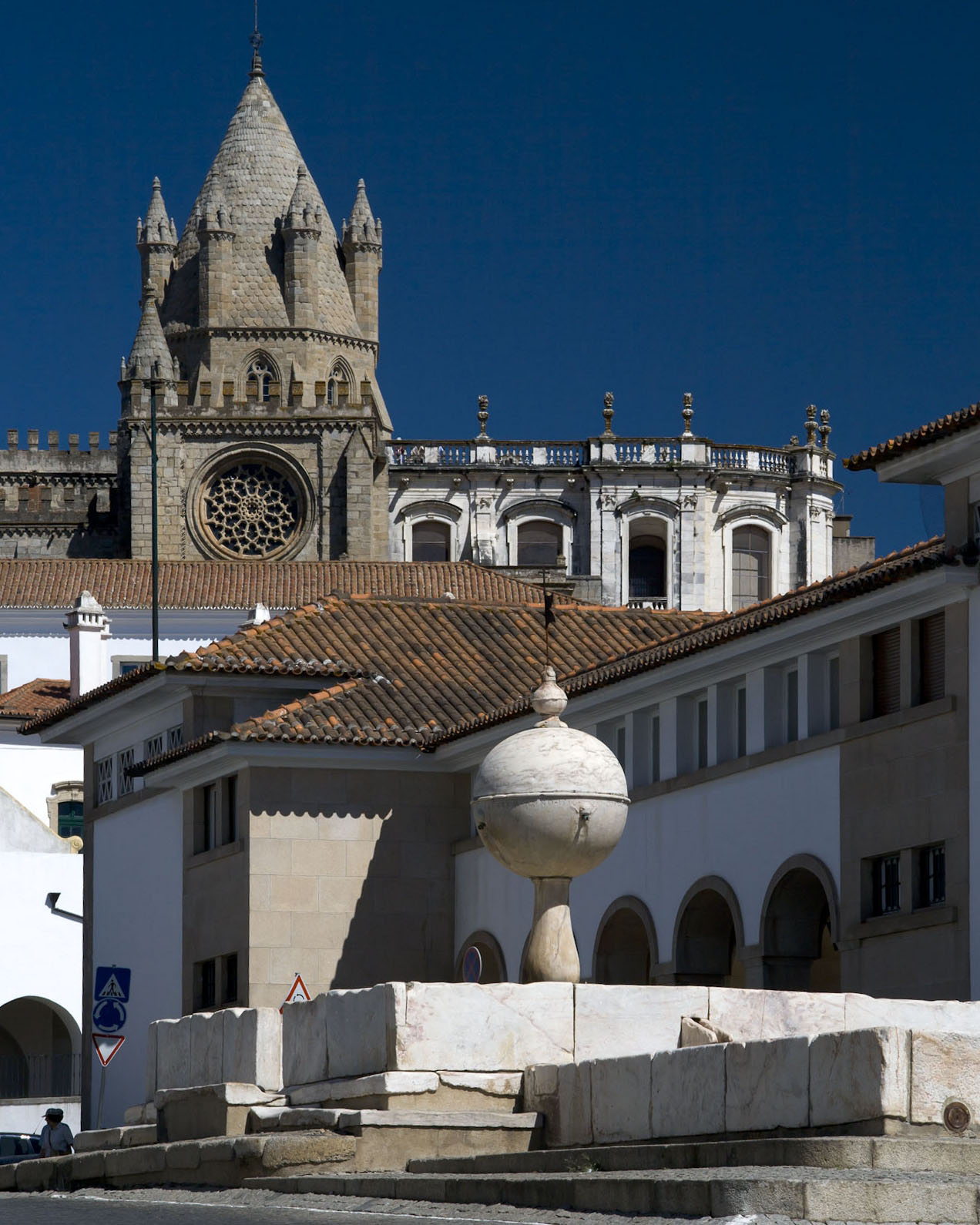
Largo das Portas da Moura

Évora is the chief city of the Alentejo region, and plays a role as an important agricultural and services center. It is home to several institutions with great importance for the region, like the state-run University of Évora and the district hospital.

In 2015, Embraer built two factories for the production of aircraft parts along with its European Engineering Center. In 2022, these factories were sold to aerospace company Aernnova, a corporate spin-off of Siemens Gamesa.

Due to its extensive historical and cultural importance, Évora, as well as the surrounding area, saw in the 2010s a great increase in its international tourism sector, which fomented the creation of many hotels, bed-and-breakfasts and various other styles of accommodation. Some of its most visited sites include the Roman Temple of Évora, the Chapel of Bones, the Cathedral of Évora, Évora's Museum, and its historical centre.

=== Transport ===
Évora can be reached by bus or train. Its railway station is the terminus of the Linha de Évora; as of 2023, an extension to Elvas is under construction, the Nova Linha de Évora. This single-track electrified line is mainly intended for freight traffic, but would also carry some passenger trains, with speeds up to 250 km/h (155 mph).

There is a small airfield, the Évora Municipal Airport, currently without commercial airline service. The closest major airports are: Beja, Lisbon, Faro and Badajoz.

== Architecture ==
Historic Centre of Évora
UNESCO World Heritage Site
- Interactive map of Historic Centre of Évora
- Criteria: Cultural: (ii)(iv)
- Reference: 361
- Inscription: 1986 (10th Session)

=== Prehistoric ===
- Anta Grande do Zambujeiro, about 10 km (6.2 mi) from Évora near Valverde: It is the larger dolmen in the region.
- Cromeleque dos Almendres, 15 km (9.3 mi) from Évora: Megalithic monument, a cromlech with archaeoastronomical interest.

=== Civic ===
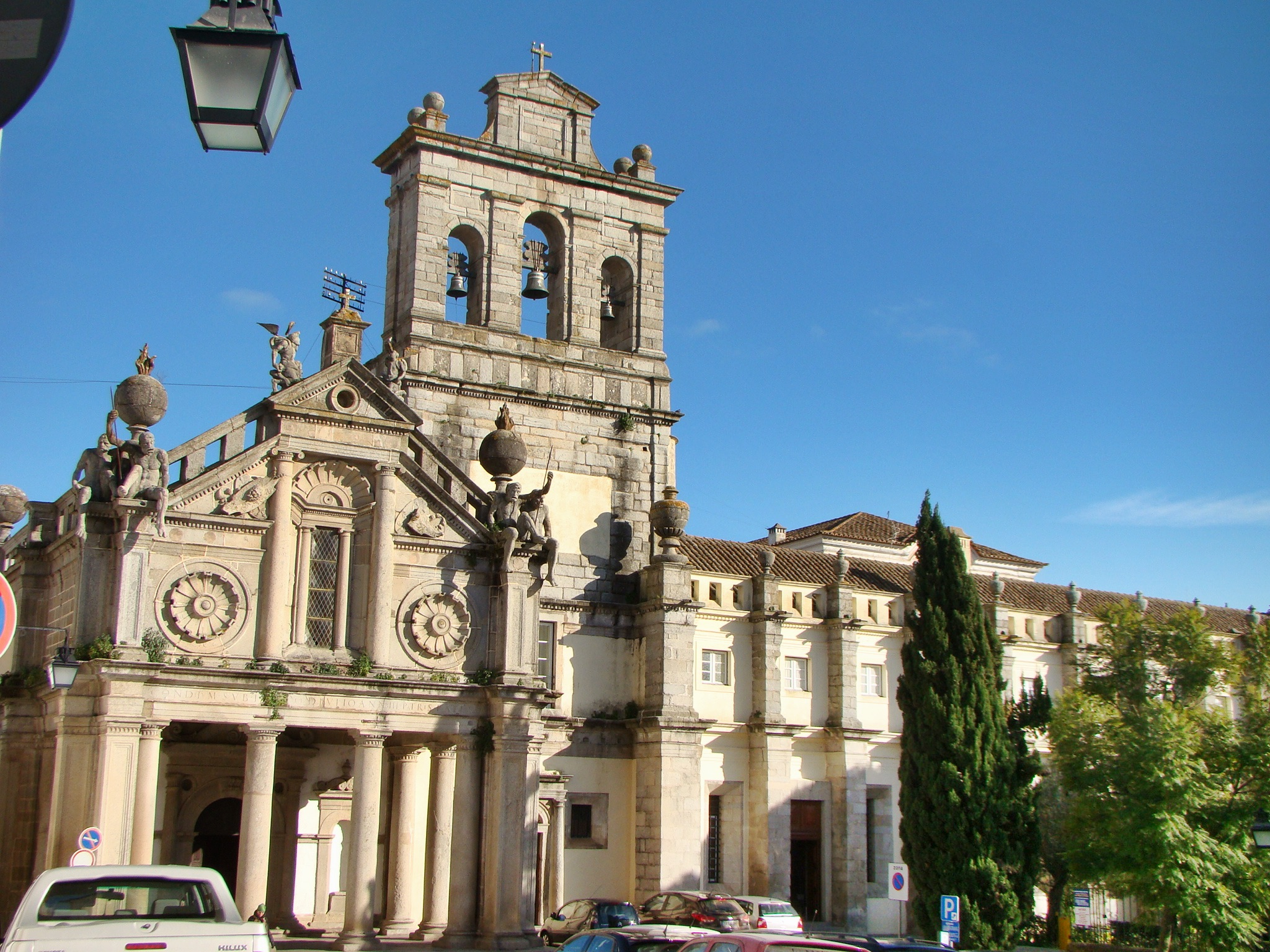
Church of Nossa Senhora da Graça

Sé – cathedral of Évora

The city of Évora is marked by the historic square in the Praça do Geraldo, where King Duarte constructed the Estaus Palace. The square is marked by the Henriquina fountain, dating to 1570, which includes eight jets symbolizing the eight streets that lead to the square. At the northern end of the square is the Church of Saint Andrew (Portuguese: Igreja de Santo Antão) built by Manuel Pires, in the 16th century. A rather large church three-nave church includes a valuable altar antependium from the 13th century in bas relief. In 1483, Fernando II, the Duke of Braganza was executed in the square, in the presence of his brother-in-law king John II. This square also witnessed thousands of autos-da-fé during the Inquisition; there were 22000 condemnations, during the course of 200 years.

- Fountain of Portas de Moura (Portuguese: Chafariz das Portas de Moura/Fonte da Porta de Moura), the Renaissance fountain (located in the Largo das Portas de Moura) was built in 1556, and an original design that includes globe surrounded by water (referencing the Age of Discovery).
- Holy Spirit College of the Order of Christ (Portuguese: Colégio do Espírito Santo/Colégio da Companhia de Jesus/Universidade de Évora), today a nucleus of the University of Évora, the former Jesuit college was ordered constructed by Cardinal-King Henrique in 1559, and includes 16th century Mannerist elements, in addition to academic buildings constructed between the 17th-18th century (including cloister).
- Royal Palace of Évora: Remnants of a palace built by King Manuel I in Gothic-Renaissance style. According to some chroniclers, it was in this palace, in 1497, that Vasco da Gama was given the command of the squadron he would lead on his maritime journey to India.
- Palace of the Counts of Basto (Portuguese: Palácio dos Condes de Basto / Paço de São Miguel da Freiria / Palácio do Pátio de São Miguel), a primitive Moorish castle and later residence of the Afonsine dynastic kings. Its outer architecture displays features of Gothic, Manueline, Mudéjar and Renaissance styles.
- Palace of the Dukes of Cadaval (Portuguese: Paço dos Duques de Cadaval/Palácio dos Duques de Cadaval), a 17th-century palace, built from the remains of an old castle (burnt down in 1384), and later serving as Governors and Royal residences. The palace includes Manueline-Moorish architectural elements (including the Tower of the Five Shields), and whose first-floor houses a collection of manuscripts, family portraits, and religious art from the 16th century.
- Prata Aqueduct (Portuguese: Aqueduto da Água de Prata), designed by military architect Francisco de Arruda (who previously designed the Belém Tower, it was built during the reign of by King João III between 1531 and 1537, the huge arches which stretched 9 kilometres (6 miles) to supply water from the interior to Évora. Originally, the aqueduct ended in the Praça do Giraldo, and bisected the city, resulting in the construction of houses, shops, and cafés built between the arches (such as in the areas of Rua da Cano, Travessa das Nunes and Rua do Salvador). A segment of the Roman wall and foundations of period buildings are preserved along Travessa Alcárcova de Cima, a narrow lane in the historic center. This structure was mentioned in the epic poem Os Lusíadas by Luís de Camões.
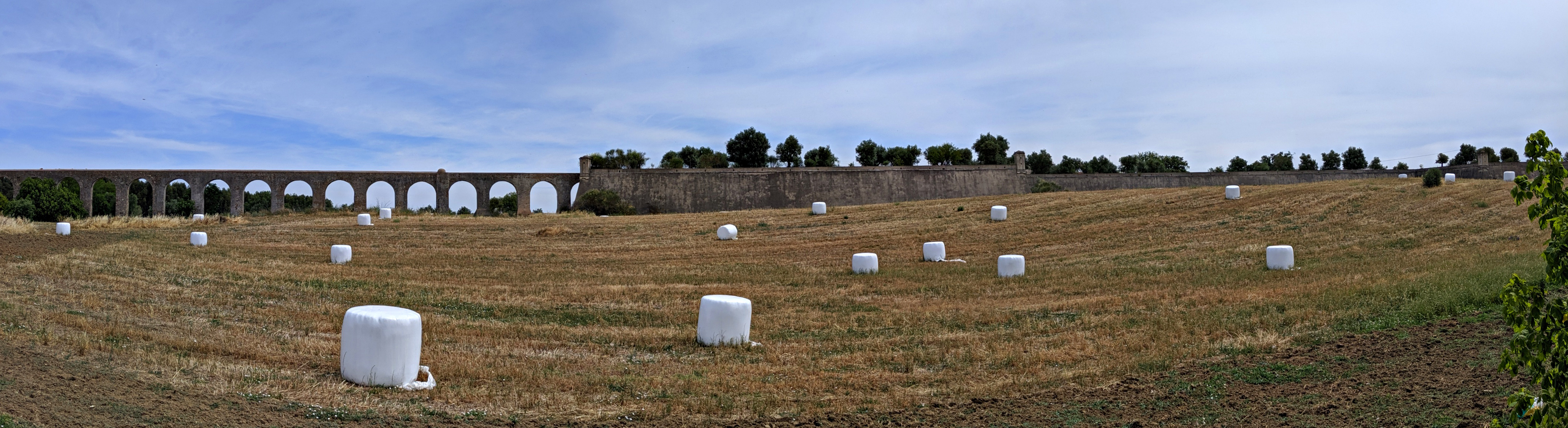
Aqueduto da Água de Prata with baled and wrapped hay, northwest of Évora
- Roman Temple of Évora (Portuguese: Templo romano de Évora), improperly referred to as the Temple of Diana, was a 1st-century (in some references 2nd or 3rd century) temple, dedicated to the cult of Emperor Augustus, that was incorporated into mediaeval building and, thus, survived destruction. Évora's most famous landmark, it is constructed of 7.68 m (25.20 ft) Corinthian columns and fourteen granite columns, and whose base, capitals and the architraves of marble excavated from Estremoz.
- The Malagueira Quarter Housing redevelopment project (Álvaro Siza Vieira architect) has received the Veronica Rudge Green Prize in Urban Design from Harvard University's Graduate School of Design in 1988 (shared with Byker Redevelopment in Newcastle, England, by architect Ralph Erskine).

=== Religious ===
Detail of the Capela dos Ossos, Bones Chapel

- Cathedral of Évora (Portuguese: Catedral de Évora): Mainly built between 1280 and 1340, it is one of the most important gothic monuments of Portugal. The cathedral has a notable main portal with statues of the Apostles (around 1335) and a beautiful nave and cloister. One transept chapel is Manueline and the outstanding main chapel is Baroque. The pipe organ and choir stalls are renaissance (around 1566).
- Chapel of São Brás (Portuguese: Capela de São Brás) Built around 1480, it is a good example of Mudéjar-Gothic with cylindrical buttresses. Only open for prayer.
- Saint Francis Church (Igreja de São Francisco): Built between the end of the 15th and the early 16th centuries in mixed Gothic-Manueline styles. The wide nave is a masterpiece of late Gothic architecture. Contains many chapels decorated in Baroque style, including the Chapel of Bones (Capela dos Ossos), totally covered with human bones.
- Lóios Convent and Church: Built in the 15th century, contains a number of tombs; the church and the cloister are Gothic in style, with a Manueline chapterhouse with a magnificent portal. The church interior is covered in azulejos (ceramic tiles) from the 18th century. In 1965 it was converted into an upmarket pousada.

== Notable people ==
=== Historical ===
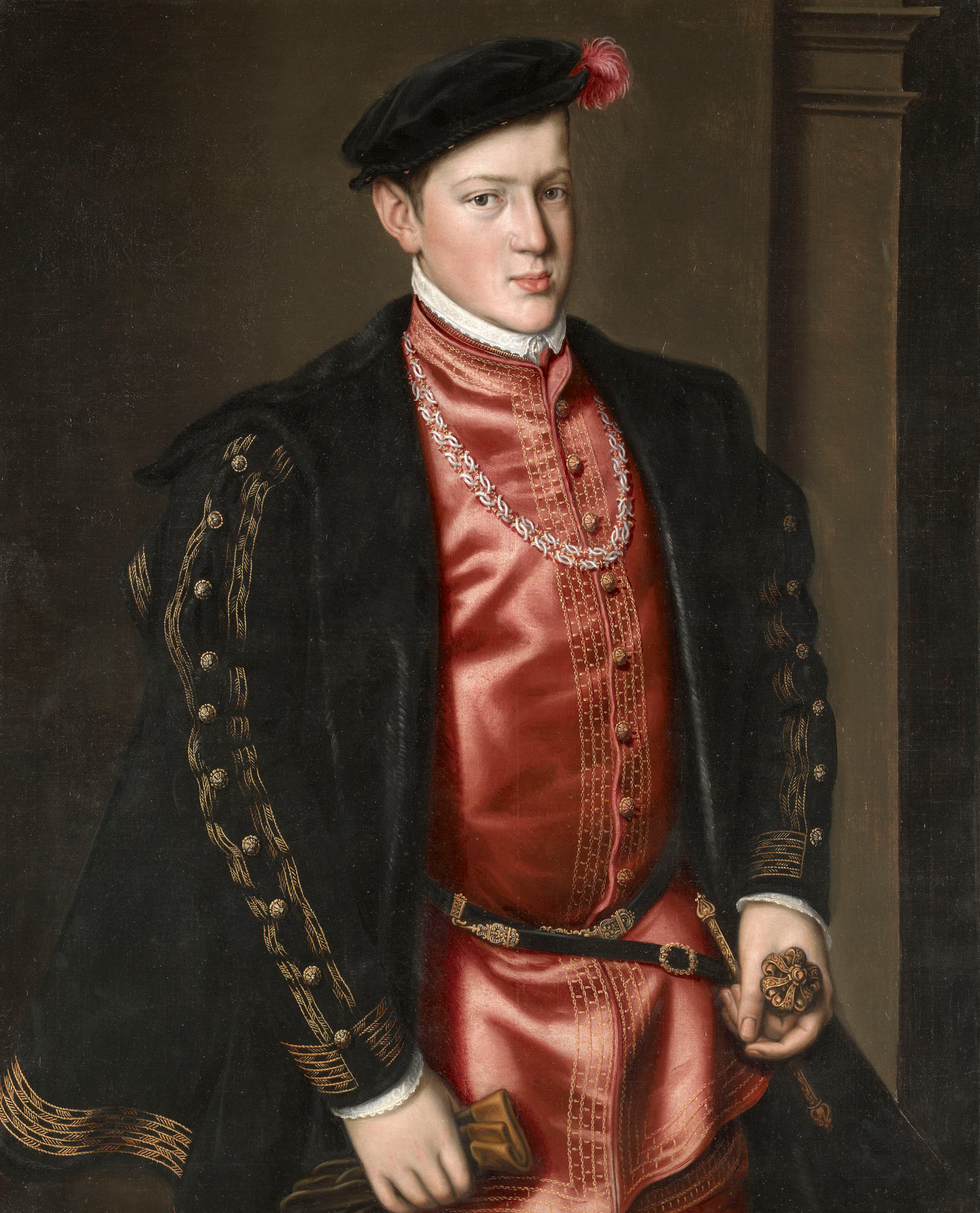
João Manuel, Prince of Portugal

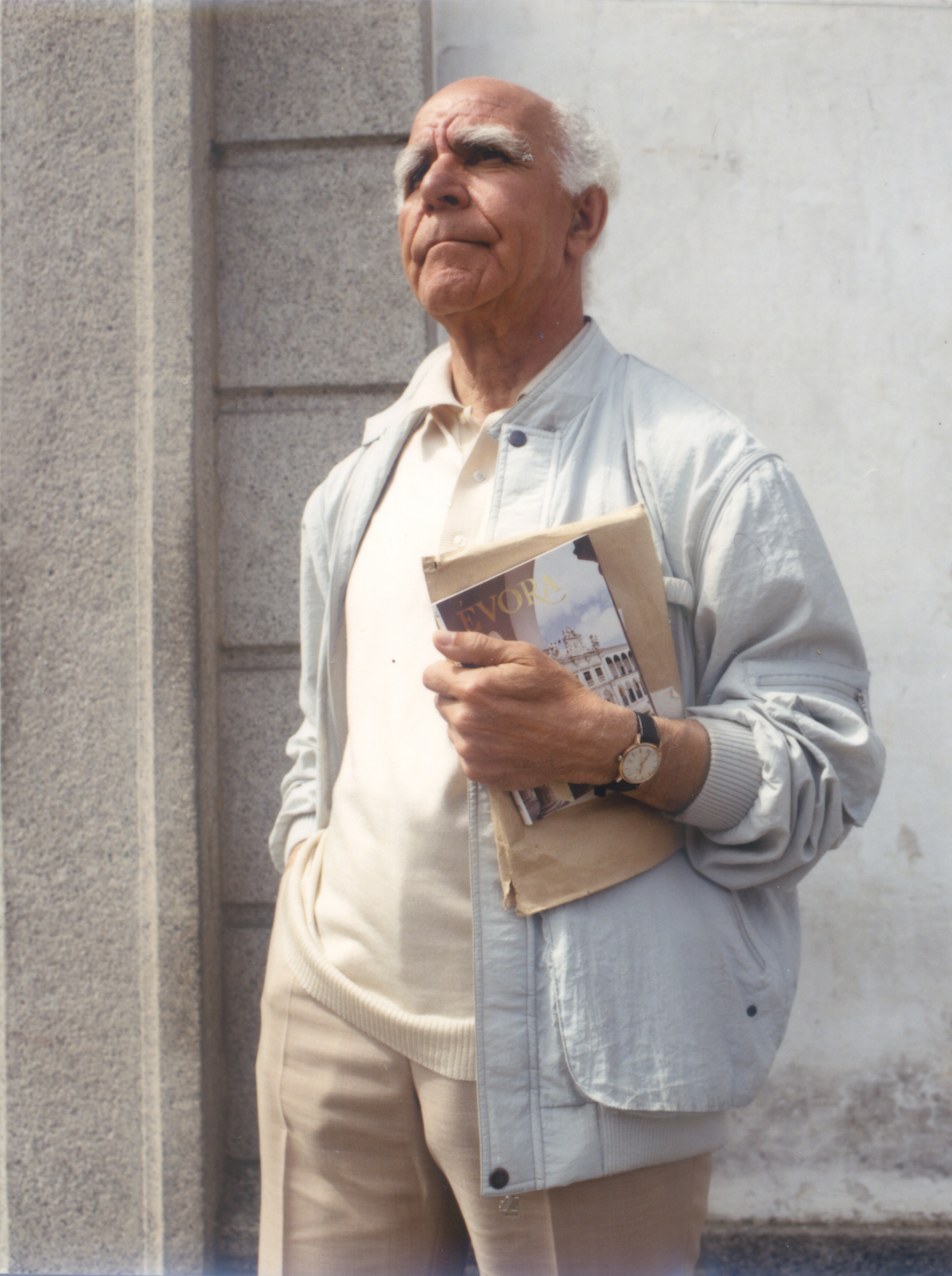
Túlio Espanca, 1987

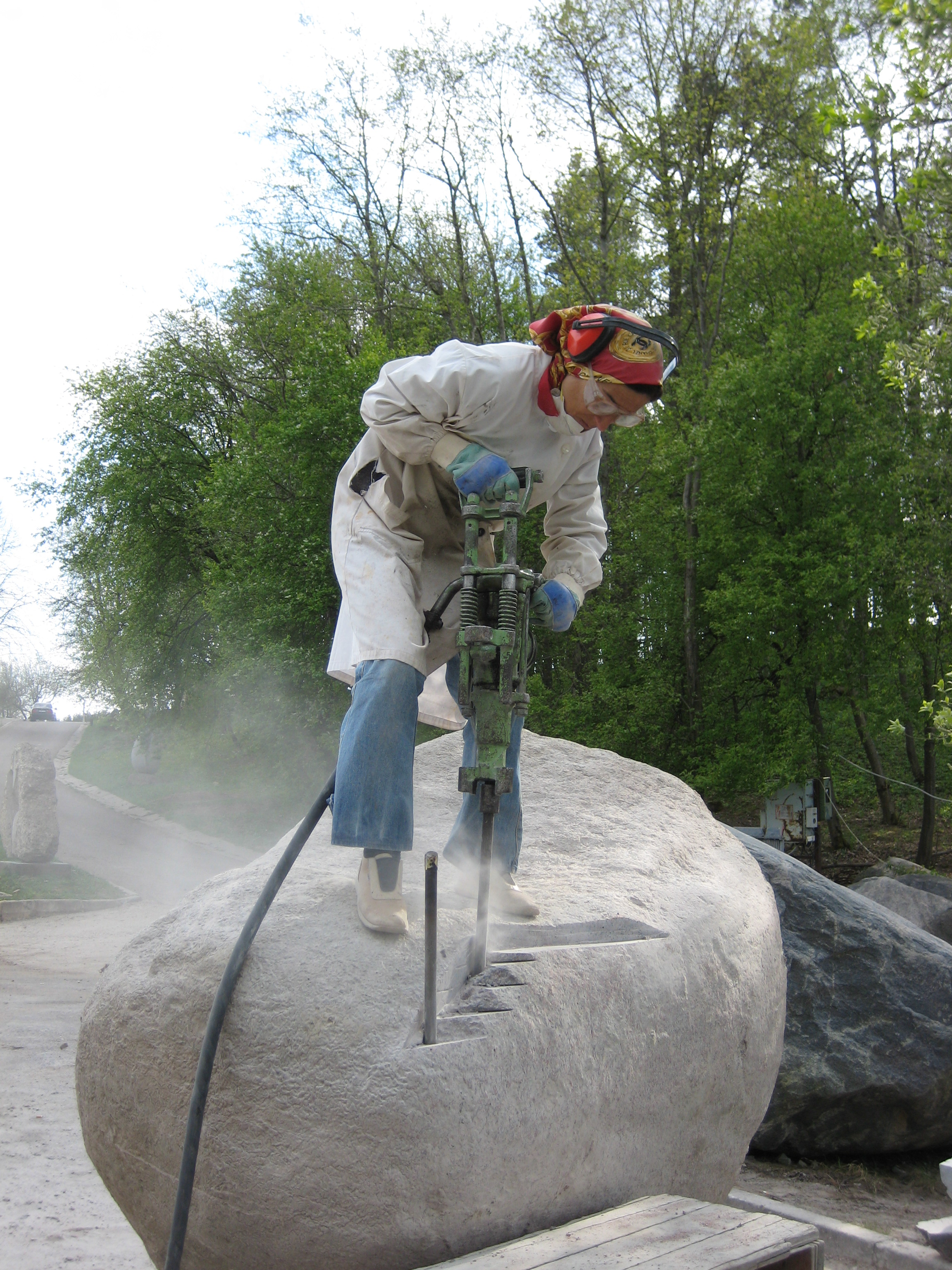
Maria Leal da Costa, 2009

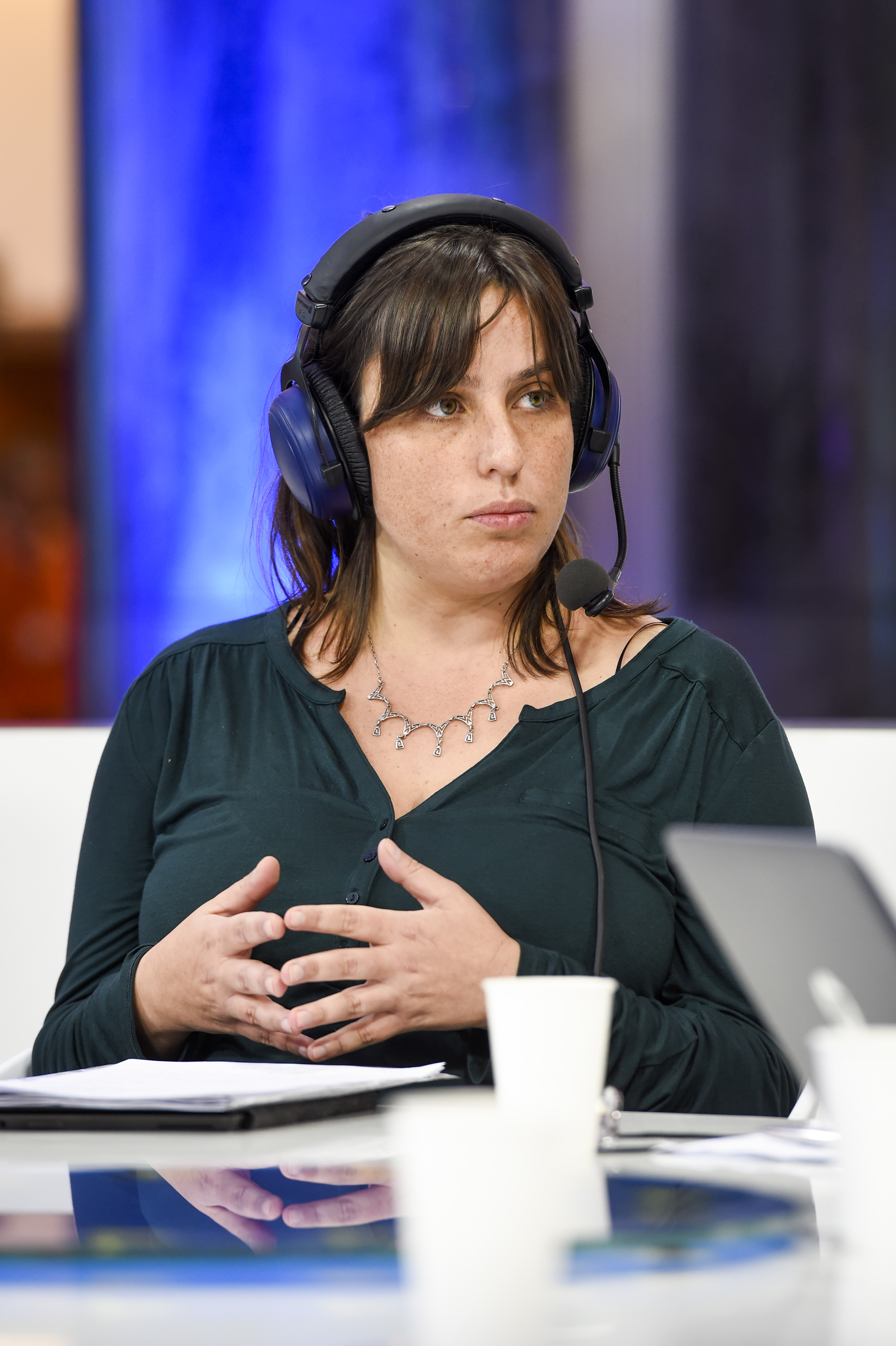
Inês Cristina Zuber, 2015

- Abd al-Majid ibn Abdun (c. 1050–1135 in Évora) was a poet from Al-Andalus
- Maria of Portugal (1342–1375) a Portuguese infanta (princess), first daughter of King Peter I
- Garcia de Resende (1470–1536) a Portuguese poet and editor. He served King John II as a page and private secretary
- Miguel da Silva (c. 1480–1556) a Portuguese nobleman, appointed by King Manuel I as ambassador to Rome in 1514
- André de Resende (1498–1573) a Dominican friar, father of archaeology in Portugal
- Cristóvão da Gama (c. 1516–1542) a Portuguese military commander who led a Portuguese army of 400 musketeers on a crusade in Ethiopia and Somalia
- Gaspar da Cruz (c. 1520–1570) a Portuguese Dominican friar who traveled to Asia and wrote one of the first detailed European accounts about China.
- João Manuel, Prince of Portugal (1537–1554) a Portuguese infante (prince), the eighth son of King John III
- Luís Mendes de Vasconcellos (c. 1542–1623) a Portuguese nobleman, colonial Governor of Angola and 55th Grand Master of the Order of Saint John
- Pedro Fernandes de Queirós (1565–1614) a Portuguese navigator in the service of Spain, known for the Spanish voyages of discovery in the Pacific Ocean
- João dos Santos (Évora – Goa 1622) a Dominican missionary in India and Africa
- Estevão Brioso de Figueiredo (1630–1689) a Roman Catholic prelate, served as Bishop of Funchal (1683–1689) and the first Bishop of Olinda (1676–1683)
- José Ribeiro da Fonseca (1690–1752) a Portuguese Franciscan, became Bishop of Porto
- Joaquim Heliodoro da Cunha Rivara (1809–1879) a Portuguese physician, professor, intellectual and politician

=== Recent times ===
- Túlio Espanca, (Wiki PT) (1913-1993) a Portuguese historian who significantly contributed to the cultural and artistic history of Évora and the Alentejo
- José Augusto Alegria, (Wiki PT) (1917–2004) a Portuguese musicologist
- José Cutileiro (born 1934) a Portuguese diplomat and writer
- Vitorino Salomé Vieira (born 1942) a Portuguese singer-songwriter whose music combines the traditional music of Alentejo and urban popular song
- António Livramento (1943–1999) a Portuguese roller hockey player of world renown and coach
- Joaquim Palminha Silva, (Wiki PT) (1945–2015) a Portuguese journalist and historian
- Vítor Norte (born 1951) a Portuguese actor and voice actor
- Carlos Francisco Carvalho Falé (born 1952) a former Portuguese footballer, played 271 games for Lusitano de Évora
- Hernâni Neves (born 1963) known as Hernâni, is a retired Portuguese football and beach soccer player
- Maria Leal da Costa (born 1964) a Portuguese sculptor, she is developing the Alentejo sculpture park
- João Magueijo (born 1967) a Portuguese cosmologist and professor in Theoretical Physics at Imperial College London
- Orlanda Velez Isidro (born 1972) a Portuguese classically trained coloratura soprano; preferred genre is Renaissance and Baroque repertoire
- Inês Zuber (born 1980) a Portuguese politician, was MEP from 2012 to 2016 for the Portuguese Communist Party
- Carla Matadinho (born 1982) a Portuguese model
- Pedro Rebocho (born 1995) a football player

== Gallery ==
Évora Cathedral

Praça do Giraldo, Évora’s main square

Church of São Francisco

Interior of the Chapel of Bones at the Church of São Francisco

Royal Palace of Évora

Bandstand in the Public Garden

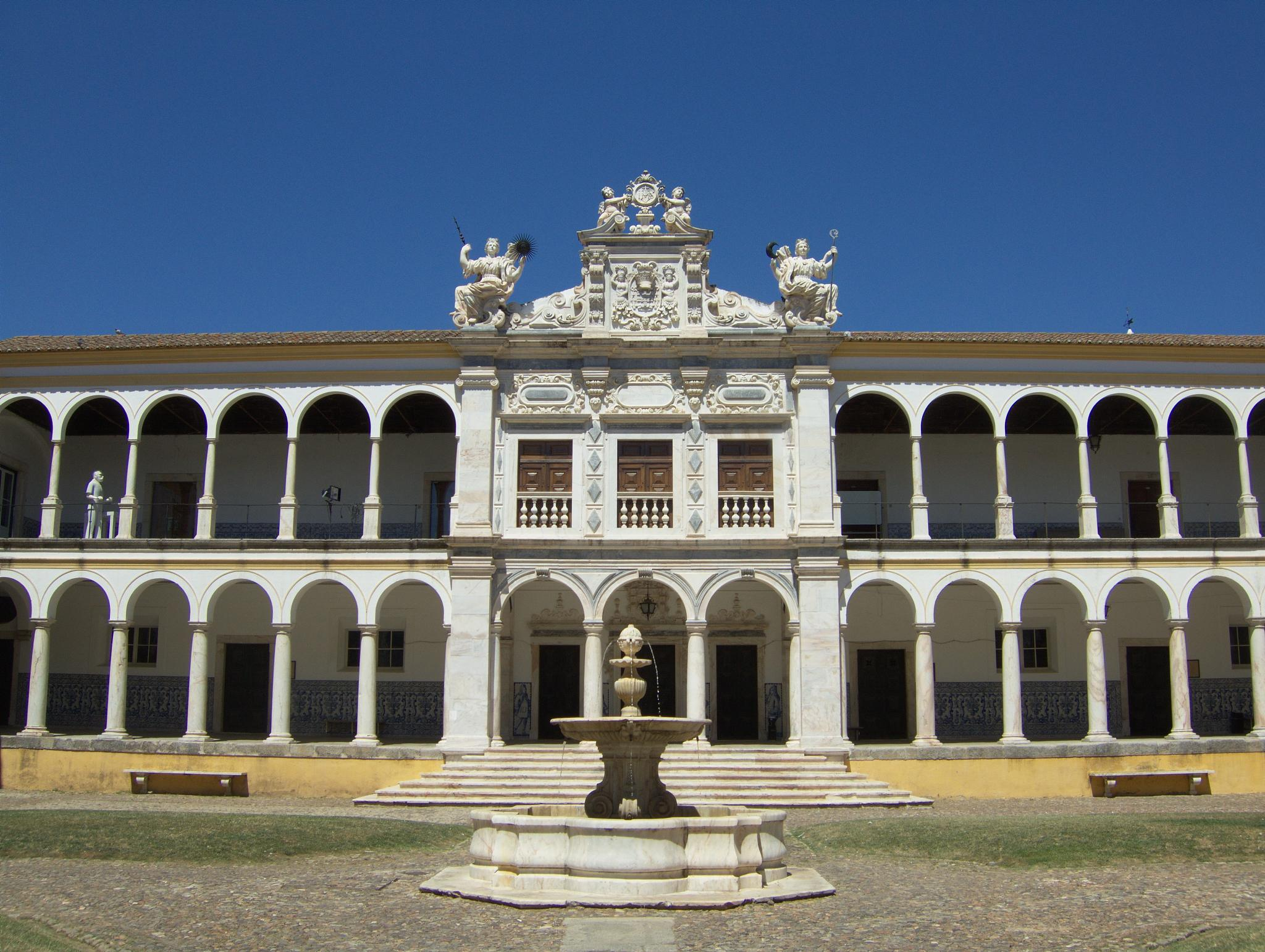
Courtyard of the University of Évora

Azulejo-lined interior of the Church of São João Evangelista (Church of the Lóios)

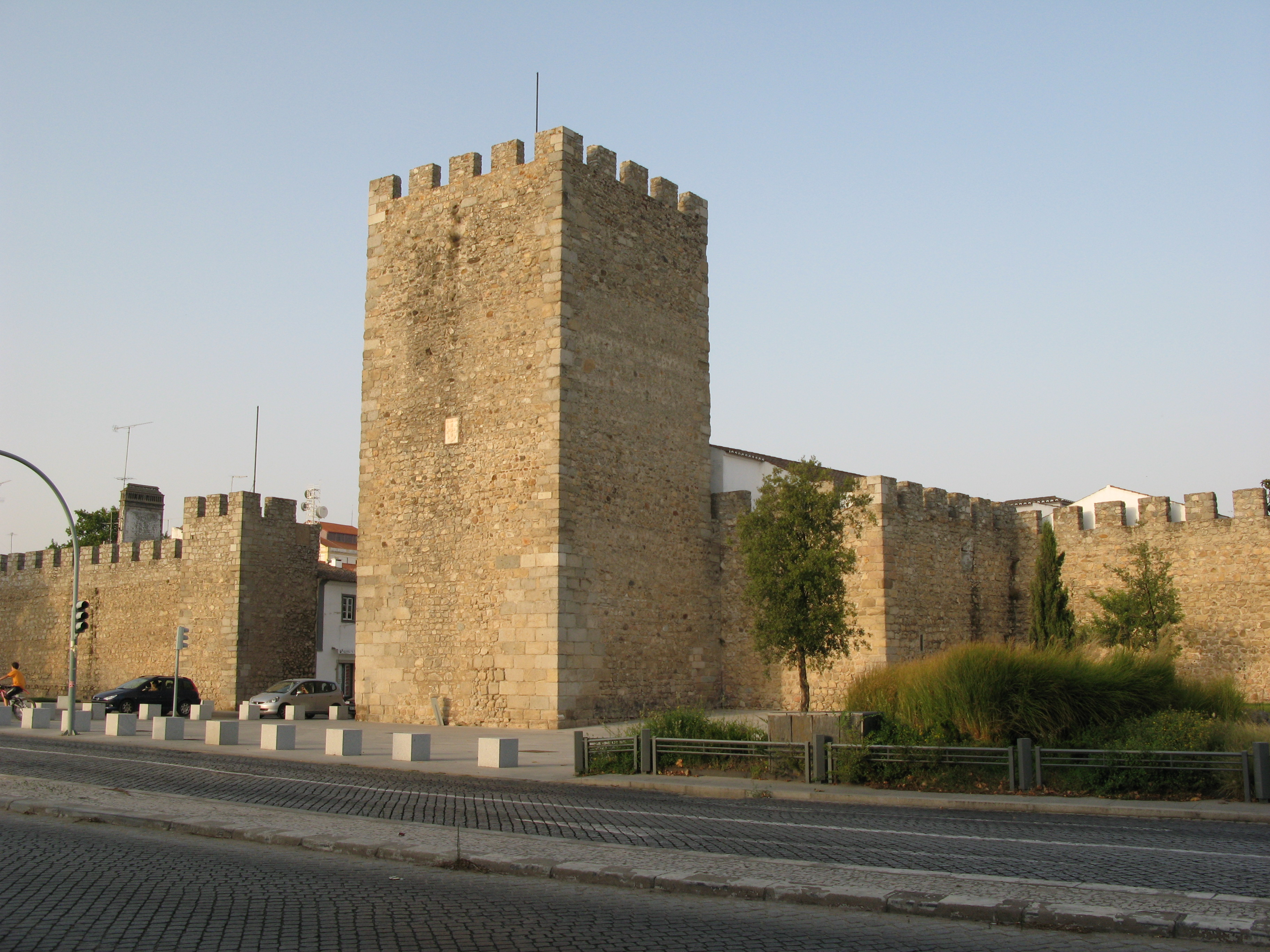
City walls

== See also ==
- University of Évora
- Evora Tambacounda 2004
- Évora IPR
