= João dos Santos =

Portuguese missionary

- Born: 16th century Évora, Kingdom of Portugal
- Died: 1622; Goa, Portuguese India
- Occupation: Dominican missionary
- Known for: Missionary in India and Africa

João dos Santos (Évora, ? – Goa, 1622) was a Portuguese Dominican missionary in India and Africa.

== Life ==
On 13 August 1586, four months after leaving Lisbon, Santos arrived in Portuguese Mozambique. He was at once sent to Sofala, where he remained four years with Father João Madeira. Between them they baptized some 1694 natives and had built three chapels when they were ordered back to Mozambique.

After a journey of hardships, they were forced to remain on the Zambesi River, Santos staying at Tete for eight months. From registers found there he discovered that the Dominicans had baptized about 20,000 natives before the year 1591 at Tete alone.

From Mozambique he was sent to the small island of Querimba, where he remained for two years. The registers here gave the information that 16,000 natives had been baptized before the year 1593. Next, he was appointed commissary of the Bulla da Cruzada at Sofala, where he stayed more than a year.

His labours in Africa ended on 22 August 1597, when he left Mozambique for Portuguese India. With the exception of eleven years spent in Europe (1606–17) he lived the rest of his life in India.

== Works ==
His book Ethiopia Oriental is a description of the Portuguese colonization of Africa at the end of the sixteenth century. He gives an account of the manners and customs of the Bantu tribes at that date.
