= São Manços e São Vicente do Pigeiro =

- Civil parish
- Location in Portugal
- Coordinates: 38.45°N 7.75°W
- Country: Portugal
- Region: Alentejo
- Intermunic. comm.: Alentejo Central
- District: Évora
- Municipality: Évora

Area
  - Total: 193.23 km^{2} (74.61 sq mi)

Population (2011)
  - Total: 1,302
  - Density: 6.7/km^{2} (17/sq mi)
- Time zone: UTC+00:00 (WET)
  - Summer (DST): UTC+01:00 (WEST)

São Manços e São Vicente do Pigeiro is a civil parish in the municipality of Évora, Portugal. It was formed in 2013 by the merger of the former parishes São Manços and São Vicente do Pigeiro. The population in 2011 was 1,302, in an area of 193.23 km^{2}.

== Architecture ==
- Church of São Manços
