= André de Resende =

Portuguese humanist (1498/1500–1573)

- Born: c. 1498/1500; Évora, Portugal
- Died: 9 December 1573; Évora, Portugal
- Occupations: Dominican friar, (Note: Historian John Martyn writes that Resende no longer wore Dominican habit after the death of Cardinal Afonso in 1540.) humanist

André de Resende (c. 1498/1500 –1573) was a Portuguese humanist Dominican friar, classical scholar, poet, and antiquarian. Resende is regarded as the father of archeology in Portugal.

== Early life and travels ==
Resende was born c. 1498 in Évora, the son of Pêro Vaz de Resende and Ângela Leonor de Góis. After his father died, he entered the local Dominican Order at the age of ten or twelve.

=== Education ===
Resende spent much of his youth traveling through Spain, France, and the Low Countries. In Spain, he attended the universities of Salamanca and Alcalá de Henares, studying Latin, Greek, and Hebrew. In France, he received theological training in Paris, Marseille, and Aix, becoming archdeacon of St. Maxime-les-Baumes.

In the late 1520s and early 1530s, Resende resided in Belgium, specifically the cities of Leuven and Brussels. He continued his education in Leuven, developing close ties with his Latin professor, Conrad Goclenius, a close friend of Erasmus. (Note: Resende had travelled to Leuven in hopes of meeting Erasmus, whose work he greatly respected. However, the Dutch humanist had already left for Basel in 1521.) Goclenius helped Resende publish his first Latin poem, Encomium urbis et academiae, in 1530 and subsequently a poem in praise of Erasmus, Desiderii Erasmi Roterodami Encomium. Impressed, Erasmus wrote to Resende expressing admiration of the poem and requesting more of his work. Resende responded by sending him a copy of Genethliacon Principis Lusitani, or Birthday Poem to the Portuguese Prince, which had been written for the newly born Prince Manuel. Despite this correspondence and Resende's deep admiration for Erasmus, the two never met in person. Still, in his letters to Damião de Góis, a close friend of Resende, Erasmus repeatedly inquired about the Portuguese poet.

While studying under Goclenius, Resende encountered other notable humanists, namely Johannes Secundus and Marius Nizolius. He also befriended Nicolaus Clenardus and offered him a position to serve as a tutor at the Portuguese court.

=== Service to Charles V ===
After several years of study, Resende departed from Leuven in 1531 and went to the court of Emperor Charles V in Brussels to work alongside the Portuguese ambassador, Pedro de Mascarenhas.

In 1532 and 1533, in the entourage of Charles V, Resende travelled across the Holy Roman Empire, residing briefly in Regensburg, Bologna, and Barcelona. During his stay in Bologna, he had access to a press and published a series of lengthy works (Genethliacon, Epicedion, and his satirical Epistola de Vita Aulica ad Speratum Ferrarium) as well as a few short poems. In July 1533, while the entourage was in Barcelona, Resende and Mascarenhas left the Emperor's Court and headed to the Portuguese Court in Évora.

== Career in Portugal ==
Resende returned to Portugal in 1533 and remained there for the rest of his life, becoming one of the most eminent humanists in the country. He was a familiar figure at the court of King John III, where he led a group of Erasmian scholars and acted as tutor to the Infante D. Duarte. (Note: Resende later wrote Duarte's biography.) Resende expressed disdain for life at court, complaining about the lack of leisure and stating he'd prefer to live abroad. He also expressed frustration with the academic conservatism that existed in Portugal.

Beginning in 1551, Resende was a professor of Sacred Theology at the University of Coimbra. After administration of the university was taken over by Jesuits in 1555, the contracts of Resende and other humanists were not renewed, and subsequently Resende went back to Évora.

In addition to teaching, Resende devoted himself to the study of antiquities, especially with respect to Évora. An admirer of ancient Rome and devout Catholic, Resende sought to construct a past and, by extension, a cultural identity for Portugal that was simultaneously Roman and Christian. In 1553, he published his História da antiguidade da cidade de Évora (History of the Antiquity of the City of Évora). In this work he claims that the Roman general Sertorius resided in Évora and frames him as a symbol of Lusitanian independence. He also argues that Évora is one of the oldest Christian cities in the Peninsula. In his comprehensive study of Iberian antiquarianism, De Antiquitatibus Lusitaniae, Resende largely neglects the period between the Romans and the Reconquista, making no reference to the era that Portugal was under Islamic rule. Besides the aforementioned works, Resende also wrote two books on aqueducts and one on ancient epitaphs.

After years of semi-retirement, Resende died in his home in Évora on 9 December 1573. At the time of his death, he was still working on De Antiquitatibus Lusitaniae. The work was completed posthumously and published in 1593.

Resende is buried in the chapel of the right transept of the Cathedral of Évora.

== Legacy ==
Together with Clenardus, Resende is considered a pioneer in advancing Christian humanism in Renaissance Portugal.

Although Resende's work was largely endorsed in his time, modern historians deem his construction of Portuguese history with regards to Rome as largely fabricated with little basis. Moreover, in the 19th century epigraphy specialist Emil Hübner concluded that an inscription brought forth by Resende, supposedly from ancient Rome, was inauthentic. (Note: The inscription corroborated Resende's assertion that Sertorius lived in the city and was responsible for the construction of its aqueduct. Although the artifact is universally recognized as a fake, modern archeologists concur that a Roman aqueduct did once bring water from Divor to Évora, somewhat validating Resende's claim.) Accordingly, Philip Spann (1981) describes Resende as "one of the great 16th-century forgers of inscriptions."

== Sources ==
- Clarke, John; de Sousa, José Baptista (2017). "Lord Holland's Portuguese Library". Journal of Anglo-Portuguese Studies (26). Centre for English, Translation, and Anglo-Portuguese Studies: 93–105.
- Curchin, Leonard A. (1990). "Spurious or Doubtful Magistrates". The Local Magistrates of Roman Spain. University of Toronto Press. pp. 236–244. ISBN 978-0-8020-5841-6. JSTOR 10.3138/j.ctt2ttxgh.20.
- Hirsch, Elisabeth Feist (1951). "The Friendship of Erasmus and Damiâo De Goes". Proceedings of the American Philosophical Society. 95 (5): 556–568. JSTOR 3143242.
- Hirsch, Elisabeth Feist (1955). "The Position of Some Erasmian Humanists in Portugal Under John III". Bibliothèque d'Humanisme et Renaissance. 17 (1): 24–35. JSTOR 20673729.
- Hirsch, Elisabeth Feist (1967). Damião de Gois: The Life and Thought of a Portuguese Humanist, 1502–1574. International Archives of the History of Ideas.
- Klucas, Joseph (1992). "Nicolaus Clenardus: A Pioneer of the New Learning in Renaissance Portugal". Luso-Brazilian Review. 29 (2): 87–98. JSTOR 3513517.
- Lawrance, J. N. H. (1989). "Review of The Muse Reborn: The Poetry of António Ferreira, by T. F. Earle". Portuguese Studies (5): 218–227. JSTOR 41104890.
- Martyn, John R. C. (1987). "A Renaissance Picnic at Resende's 'Quinta.'". Portuguese Studies. 3. Modern Humanities Research Association: 70–76. JSTOR 41104837.
- Martyn, John (1988a). "THE RELATIONSHIP BETWEEN LÚCIO ÂNGELO ANDRÉ DE RESENDE AND IOHANNES SECUNDUS". Humanistica Lovaniensia. 37: 244–254. JSTOR 23973698.
- Martyn, John (1988b). "André de Resende and the 11,000 Holy Virgins" (PDF). Hvmanistas. 39/40. University of Coimbra: 197–210.
- Martyn, John R.C. (1989). "ANDRÉ DE RESENDE — ORIGINAL AUTHOR OF ROMA PRISCA". Bibliothèque d'Humanisme et Renaissance. 51 (2): 407–11. JSTOR 20677839.
- Pereira, Esteves; Rodrigues, Guilherme (1904). Portugal : diccionario historico, chorographico, heraldico, biographico, bibliographico, numismatico e artistico (in Portuguese). Vol. 3. Lisboa: J. Romano Torres.
- Russo, Alessandro (2024). "Lights on the Antipodes: 'Made Throughout the Entire World'". A New Antiquity: Art and Humanity as Universal, 1400–1600. Penn State University Press. pp. 25–57. doi:10.5325/jj.15238527.6.
- Spann, Philip O. (1981). "Lagobriga Expunged: Renaissance Forgeries and the Sertorian War". Transactions of the American Philological Association. 111: 229–235. doi:10.2307/284131. JSTOR 284131.
- Senos, Nuno (2019). "An Appropriate Past for Renaissance Portugal: André de Resende and the City of Évora". In Karl A.E. Enenkel; Konrad A. Ottenheym (eds.). In The Quest for an Appropriate Past in Literature, Art and Architecture. Vol. 60. Brill. pp. 127–50. JSTOR 10.1163/j.ctvbqs5nk.12.
- Stinson, Robert R. (1972). "Gil Vicente, Erasmus, and a Legend". Romance Notes. 13 (3): 535–40. JSTOR 43802496.
