= Evora Tambacounda 2004 =

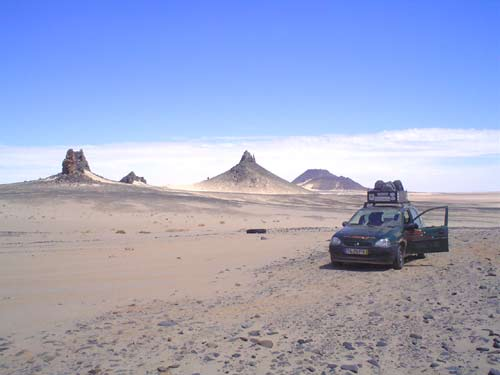
Évora Tambacounda 2004 in Rich Mountains north Mauritania way to Bir Moghrein

Évora Tambacounda 2004 was an overland expedition starting in Évora, Portugal and ending in Tambacounda, Senegal. the trip with more than 13000 km took 32 days round-trip through Portugal, Spain, Morocco, Western Sahara, Mauritania, Senegal, Gambia.

With a main support sponsorship from Évora City Council (Câmara Municipal de Évora), Diário do Sul, Praxis Clube and University of Évora the trip was possible to unite several countries where cultural exchange and social relationship already come from ancient time.

== Sponsors ==
Praxis Clube-Évora, Diário do Sul, Serviços de Acção Social da Universidade de Évora, Rádio Telefonia do Alentejo, JB Photo, Câmara Municipal de Évora, O Pierrot Artesanato Regional, Associação de Estudantes da Universidade de Évora, Bar Marginália-Portimão, Bar Aldebaran-Zaragoza-Espanha, Visão Periférica-Portimão, Orlando Conceição Automoveis-Santa Iria de Azoia, Clube Trilhos do Alentejo, Virtual Tourist-Real Travelers, João Leitão sarl - Publicité, Tourisme et Logistique, Autopress.

== Participants ==
Four participants coming from Portugal and Spain participated in this project: Xana Coelho, Patricia Porras de las Heras, Eric Gonçalves and João Leitão.

== Vehicle ==
Opel Corsa 12v 1.0 2000
