= Royal Palace of Évora =

Building in Évora, Évora District, Portugal

Coordinates: 38°34′04″N 7°54′34″W

The surviving Gallery of Dames of the Royal Palace of Évora

The Royal Palace of Évora (Portuguese: Paço Real de Évora), also known as the Royal Palace of São Francisco (Paço Real de São Francisco) and the Palace of King Manuel I (Palácio de D. Manuel), is a former royal residence of the Kings of Portugal, in Évora, the capital of Alentejo.

The palace has its origins in a convent built in the 13th century. During the 14th century, the convent came under royal use when the royal family was in the Alentejo, but only became a proper palace under the reign of King John I, who used it as a personal retreat from the court. It became a royal palace during King Afonso V's reign, though it was the successive reigns of King John II and Manuel I that turned the originally ordinary palace into a grandiose renaissance palace, truly fit for a king. Over the centuries, the palace fell prey to war, decay, and urban redevelopment, which destroyed nearly all of the palace, with only a few segments of the palace still existing.

The Royal Palace of Évora was one of the centers of the Portuguese Renaissance, under King Manuel I, where playwrights, like Gil Vicente, and explorers, like Vasco da Gama, sought audiences with the king. During this time, the palace was constantly being added to and worked on, a never ending piece of art during the time of Évora's cultural and political golden age.

== History ==
The Royal Palace of Évora has its origins in the Convent and College of São Francisco, built before the reign of King Afonso IV. The convent's first royal function was in 1336, when Prince Pedro of Portugal celebrated his marriage to Constanza Manuel, which put the convent on royal notice.

In 1387, King John I took the first step in transforming the convent to a palace, when he ordered that two chambers, and antechamber, an inn, servants houses, a well, and an orange grove all be built at the convent, and evicted resident Franciscans from certain wings of the convent turned palace. While he turned the convent into a good sized palace, it was a personal palace, not a royal one, only for the use of the King, his Queen, and their children.

In 1470, King Afonso V raised the Palace of São Francisco, as it was known at the time, to the level of a royal palace. He expanded the complex and installed his court there, previously located in Estaus Palace. The King spent large sums of time at the palace, but after his defeat in the War of the Castilian Succession, he lived the rest of his life in a monastery, near Sintra.

King Afonso V's son, King John II, would be the first king to use the palace as a full-time palace, and not as a retreat or seasonal palace, like his predecessors. From 1481 to 1482, King John II installed the Portuguese Cortes, his parliaments, in the Royal Palace of Évora. In 1482, in order to better accommodate the Cortes, King John II expanded the former rectory of the convent into offices for the High Offices of the Royal Court, which allowed for a more organized and structured Cortes, thus allowing King John II to live at the palace for a long period. In 1490, King John II opened the Portuguese Cortes once again at the palace and on 24 March 1490, the palace became the center of festivities and ceremony for the marriage of Afonso, Prince of Portugal to Isabella, Princess of Asturias. To facilitate the marriage celebrations, King John II expanded the palace, through the construction of a new wing and gardens. In 1493, King John II amplified his works on the palace, creating the Hall of Ambassadors, the Queen's Hall, the Royal Armory, and the Tribunal of the Palace of São Francisco, thus pushing the friars of the palace into smaller quarters. In 1495, Pope Alexander VI granted King John II, as per his request, the right to completely evict all clergymen still residing in the convent part of the palace, so long that he build them a church and new convent.

With King John II's death, in 1495, his cousin, Manuel I, Duke of Beja and Viseu, succeeded King John II as King Manuel I of Portugal. King Manuel I's personal monopoly on the spice trade allowed the King to be a great patron of the arts, constructing numerous palaces, convents, and churches throughout the country. King Manuel I took a great interest in Évora, establishing his court there on various occasions. From 1502 to 1520, King Manuel I ordered a vast series of renovations, constructions, and enlargements. During the Manueline Campaigns, as the works are collectively known as, the palace grew to one of the largest palaces in Iberia. The additions were inspired by Alhambra of Granada. Through architects Martim Lourenço, Álvaro Anes, and António de Lagoa the Manuline Campaign saw the construction of Couto Hall, the Wing of the Infantes, an infirmary, the Royal Gardens and Hunting Grounds, the Royal Library, and the Gallery of Dames, which is the only part of the palace to survive to present day. Alongside expansion of the palace, King Manuel I also renovated the existing parts of the palace, remodeling the Queen's Hall, the servants quarters, and the Rossio of the Palace. In 1519, King Manuel I ordered architect André Pires to turn the plain Hall of Ambassadors into a Manueline Throne Room, which would direct itself towards the Palace Rossio.

In 1616, during Iberian Union, Philip II of Spain visited Évora and at the request of the Franciscans, issued a royal diploma that integrated the building, vegetable garden, orchard and garden at the Convent, beginning the ruin of the Queen's Room with the construction of 2 bedrooms of friars and use of the masonry and other materials of the Palace; Century. Most of the complex was destroyed during the Portuguese Restoration War

Since 1865, the Palace of Manuel was used as an Archaeological Museum, theater and exhibition space, until a collapse on February 18, 1881, destroyed its roofs. After the disaster, it was adapted to the public theater house - the Teatro Eborense - after the works; directed by the engineer Adriano de Sousa Monteiro, changed the original design, adding a second floor with metallic frame, according to the taste of the time. In March 1916 it was destroyed by fire, and remained so until 1943, when it was recovered by the National Monuments, which restored the property and saved the essential parts of the old pavilion

== Gallery ==
Elevated view

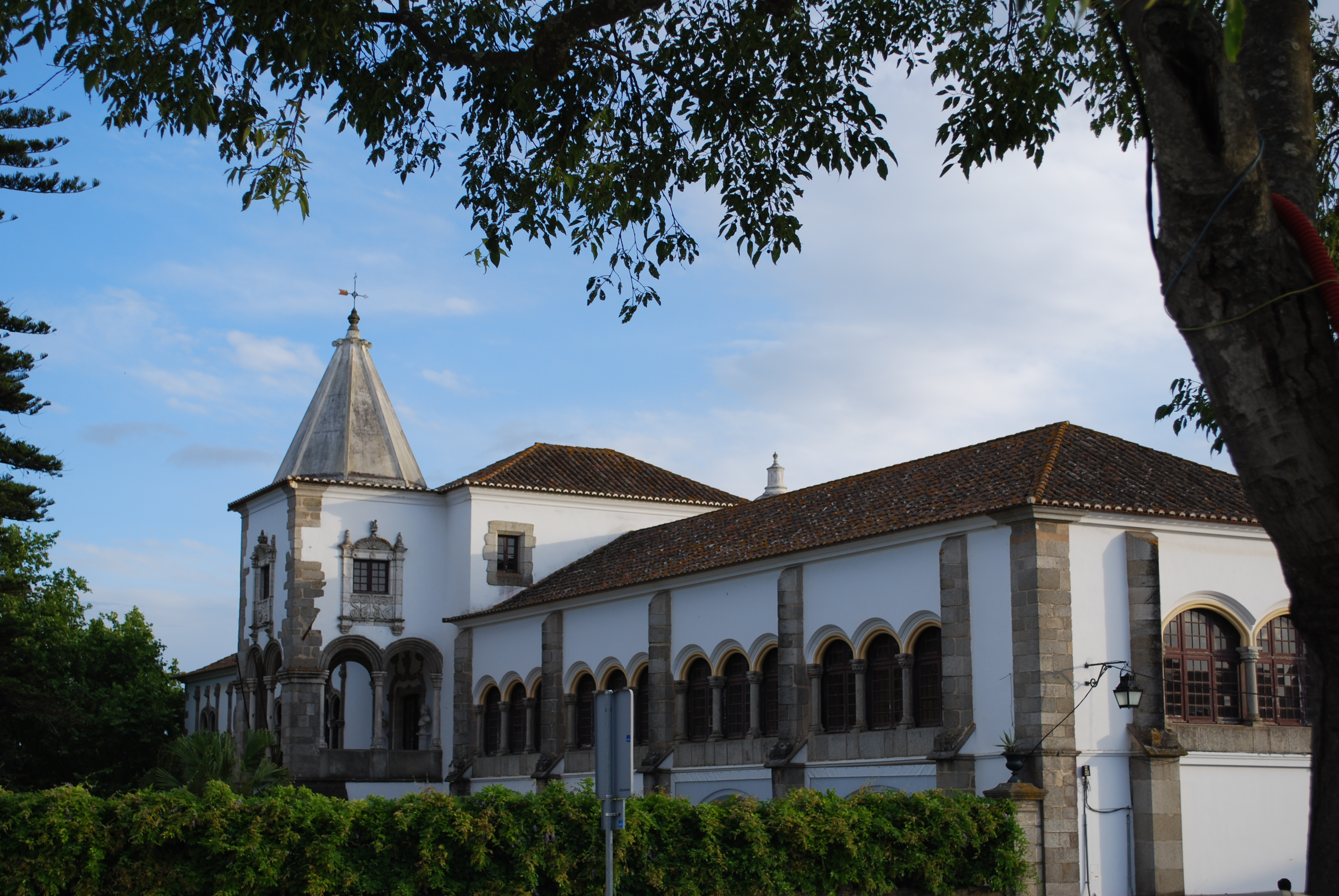
Oblique view

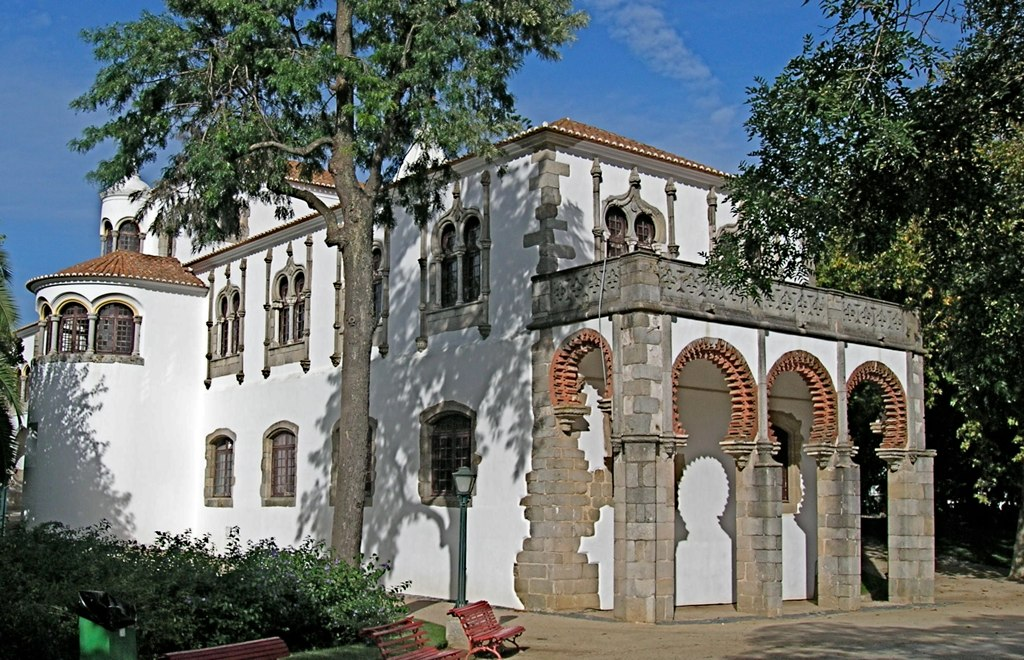
Opposite façade

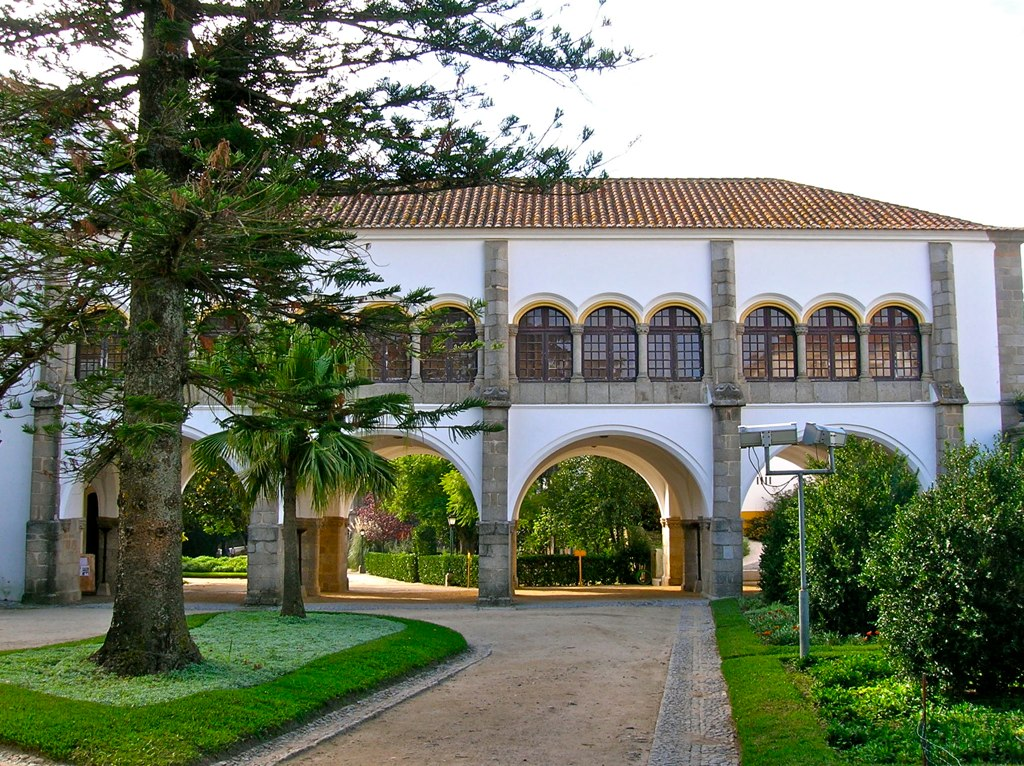
Arcaded wing

== Sources ==
- S.I.P.A. -Paços de Évora / Paço de D. Manuel / Palácio de D. Manuel
- C.M. Évora - Palácio de D. Manuel
