= Carla Matadinho =

Portuguese model

- Born: 16 December 1982 (age 43); Évora, Portugal
- Modeling information
- Height: 1.75 m (5 ft 9 in)
- Hair color: Blond
- Eye color: Brown
- Website: www.carlamatadinho.net

Carla Matadinho (born 16 December 1982 in Évora) is a Portuguese model.

== Career ==
Matadinho is one of the most famous Portuguese models, after her start at 15 with Miss Sporting. She then was crowned Miss Concelhos de Portugal and Miss Alentejo at 16. At 19, she became the first Miss Playboy from Portugal. She has also finished the Miss Portugal and Miss Figueira da Foz courses.

Matadinho has worked in many publicity works from Levi's to Triumph, and from Fátima Lopes passerelle to Maxmen (Maxim magazine in Portugal) magazine covers.

She has brown eyes, blond hair and white skin. She is 1.75 m (5 ft 9 in) high, 86 cm (34 in) chest, 60 cm (24 in) waist, and dress number 34/36.
