= Castelo de Torre de Coelheiros =

Castle in Portugal

Coordinates: 38.4123013°N 7.8362802°W

Castelo de Torre de Coelheiros is a castle in Portugal. It is classified by IGESPAR as a Site of Public Interest. It was built in the mid-fourteenth century.
