= Nicolas Cleynaerts =

Flemish grammarian and traveler (1495–1542)

The Reverend Nicolas Cleynaerts
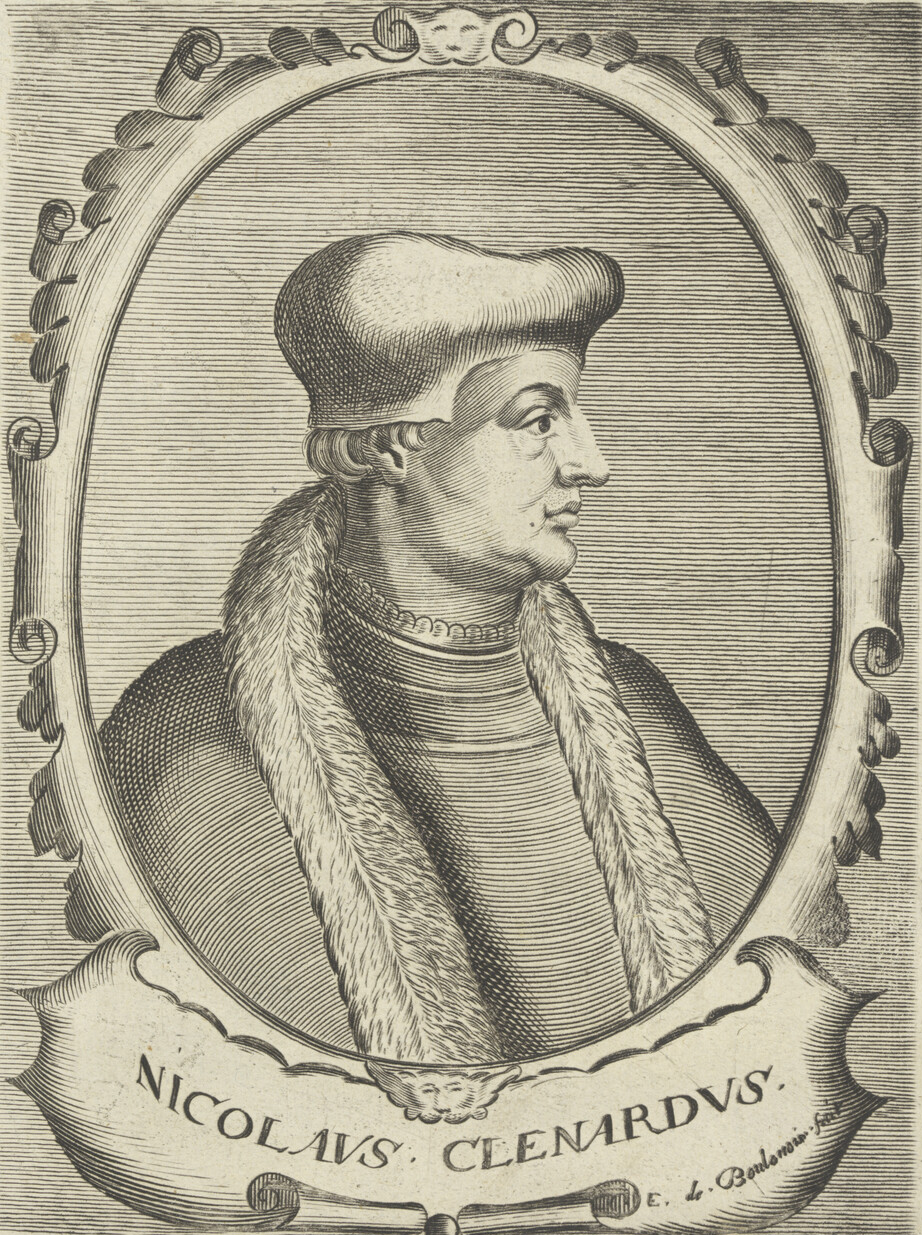
- Engraved portrait of Nicolaes Cleynaerts by Edme de Boulonois
- Born: 5 December 1495; Diest, Habsburg Netherlands
- Died: 1542 (aged 46–47); Alhambra, Spain
- Occupations: Priest; philologist; scholar; linguist
- Movement: Renaissance humanism

Academic background
- Education: University of Leuven

Nicolas Cleynaerts (Clenardus or Clenard) (5 December 1495 – 1542) was a Flemish grammarian and traveler. He was born in Diest, in the Duchy of Brabant.

== Life ==
Cleynaerts was a follower of Jan Driedo. Educated at the University of Leuven, he was ordained a priest. He also became a professor of Latin, which he taught by the conversational method.

A desire to read the Koran led him to try to establish a connection between Hebrew and Arabic. These studies resulted in a scheme for proselytism among the Arabs, based on study of the language, which should enable Europeans to combat Islam by peaceful methods. In pursuit of this, he travelled to Spain in 1531, and after teaching Greek and Latin at Salamanca was summoned to the court of Portugal as tutor to Dom Henrique, brother of João III.

He found another patron in Louis Mendoza, marquis of Mondéjar, governor general of Granada. There with the help of a Moorish slave he gained a knowledge of Arabic. He tried in vain to gain access to the Arabic manuscripts in the possession of the Spanish Inquisition, and finally, in 1540, set out for Fez in Morocco to seek information for himself.

Cleynaerts, who as a Christian priest was subject to abuse by the Muslim population, settled in the Jewish quarter of Fez, the mellah, rather than in the Christian funduq for he perceived it safer. Though he also experienced hostility from some in the Jewish community, he formed a number of close friendships with some Jews who tutored him in Arabic and whom he in turn tutored in Latin. Cleynaerts tried in vain to buy Arabic books at the bookstalls which were installed on Fridays by the Great Mosque as he claims that Christians and Jews were not allowed to enter this space. He stayed in Fez until the end of 1541. Then, after fifteen months of privation and suffering he returned to Granada, and died in the autumn of 1542. He was buried in the Alhambra.

== Works ==
Cleynaerts applied himself to the preparation of manuals of Greek and Hebrew grammar, in order to simplify the difficulties of learners. His Tabulae in grammaticen hebraeam (1529), Institutiones in linguam graecam (1530), and Meditationes graecanicae (1531) appeared at Leuven. The Institutiones and Meditationes passed through a number of editions, and had many commentators. He maintained a principle revived in modern teaching, that the learner should not be puzzled by elaborate rules until he has obtained a working acquaintance with the language.

== Sources ==
- Garcés, María Antonia (2002). Cervantes in Algiers: A Captive's Tale. Vanderbilt University Press. ISBN 978-0-8265-1470-7.
- Gerber, Jane S. (1980). Jewish Society in Fez 1450-1700: Studies in Communal and Economic Life. BRILL. ISBN 978-90-04-05820-0.
- Stillman, Norman A. (1979). The Jews of Arab Lands. Jewish Publication Society. ISBN 978-0-8276-1155-9.
