= Coutinho =

- Coat of arms associated to Coutinho
- Language: Portuguese

Origin
- Meaning: small private property
- Region of origin: Portugal

Coutinho is a noble Portuguese language surname. It is a diminutive of Couto (Couto means 'enclosed pasture'). It is from Late Latin cautum, from the past participle of cavere ‘to make safe.' It may refer to:

== Artists ==
- Afrânio Coutinho (1911–2000), Brazilian literary critic and essayist
- Domício Coutinho (1931–2024), Brazilian novelist
- Eduardo Coutinho (1933–2014), Brazilian film director
- Kemiyondo Coutinho, Ugandan actress and filmmaker
- Laerte Coutinho (born 1951), Brazilian cartoonist and screenwriter
- Rafael Coutinho (born 1980), Brazilian comics creator
- Sonia Coutinho (1939–2013), Brazilian journalist

== Nobles ==
- Domingos António de Sousa Coutinho, 1st Marquis of Funchal (1762–1833), Portuguese diplomat
- Fernão Martins da Fonseca Coutinho, Portuguese nobleman
- Francisco Coutinho, 4th Count of Marialva (1465–1532), Portuguese nobleman
- Gonçalo Coutinho, 2nd Count of Marialva, Portuguese nobleman
- Gonçalo Vasques Coutinho, 2nd Marshal of Portugal, Portuguese nobleman
- Luís Pinto de Sousa Coutinho, 1st Viscount of Balsemão (1735–1804), Portuguese nobleman
- Mariana Carlota de Verna Magalhães Coutinho, Countess of Belmonte (1779–1855), Portuguese-born Brazilian court official
- Rodrigo de Sousa Coutinho, 1st Count of Linhares (1755–1812), Portuguese nobleman
- Vasco Fernandes Coutinho, lord of Couto, Portuguese nobleman
- Vasco Fernandes Coutinho, 1st Count of Marialva (c. 1385–1450), 3rd Marshal of Portugal, 1st Count of Marialva
- Vasco Fernandes Coutinho, captain of Espírito Santo (1490–1561), Portuguese nobleman and the first donatary of the Captaincy of Espírito Santo
- Vitório Maria de Sousa Coutinho, 2nd Count of Linhares (1790–1857), Portuguese politician, second prime minister of Portugal

== Politicians and soldiers ==
- Aires Pinto de Sousa Coutinho (1778–1836), former captain-general of the Azores
- Alberto Coutinho (1969–2026), American politician
- António Alva Rosa Coutinho (1926–2010), Portuguese admiral and political activist
- António de Sousa Coutinho, Portuguese politician and former governor of Portuguese Ceylon
- António Borges Coutinho (1923–2011), Portuguese lawyer and politician
- Augusto Coutinho (born 1962), Brazilian politician
- Aureliano Coutinho, Viscount of Sepetiba (1800–1855), Brazilian politician
- Claire Coutinho (born 1985), British Member of Parliament
- Diogo de Melo Coutinho, captain-general of Portuguese Ceylon
- Henrique da Silva Coutinho, fourth president of the Brazilian state of Espírito Santo
- Humberto Coutinho (1946–2018), Brazilian physician and politician
- José Pereira Coutinho (born 1957), Macanese politician
- Manuel de Sousa Coutinho (1540–1591), Portuguese colonial official
- Ricardo Coutinho (born 1960), Brazilian politician
- Victor Hugo de Azevedo Coutinho (1871–1955), Portuguese naval officer, politician and professor
- Vitório Maria de Sousa Coutinho, 2nd Count of Linhares (1790–1857), Portuguese politician, second prime minister of Portugal

== Sportspeople ==
- Coutinho (footballer, born 1943) (1943–2019; Antônio Wilson Vieira Honório), Brazilian football manager and former striker
- Coutinho (footballer, born 1984) (1984–2020; Rafael Coutinho Barcellos dos Santos), Brazilian footballer
- Alice Coutinho (born 2000), French cyclist
- Andrey Coutinho (born 1990), Brazilian footballer
- Anthony Coutinho (born 1940), Indian sprinter
- Bruno Coutinho (footballer, born 1969), Indian footballer
- Bruno Coutinho (footballer, born 1986), Brazilian footballer
- Cláudio Coutinho (1939–1981), Brazilian football manager
- Diogo Coutinho (born 1977), Portuguese rugby player
- Domingos António de Sousa Coutinho, Marquês do Funchal (1896–1984), Portuguese horse rider
- Douglas Coutinho (born 1994), Brazilian footballer
- Geisa Coutinho (born 1980), Brazilian track and field athlete
- Gino Coutinho (born 1982), Dutch footballer
- Gustavo Coutinho (born 1999), Brazilian footballer
- Hudson Coutinho (born 1972), Brazilian football manager
- Lucas Coutinho (born 1996), Brazilian footballer
- Mirella Coutinho (born 1994), Brazilian water polo player
- Philippe Coutinho (born 1992), Brazilian footballer
- Piedade Coutinho (1920–1997), Brazilian Olympic women's swimmer
- Rogério de Assis Silva Coutinho (born 1987), Brazilian footballer

== Scientists and doctors ==
- António Coutinho (born 1946), Portuguese immunologist
- António Xavier Pereira Coutinho (1851–1939), Portuguese botanist
- Elsimar M. Coutinho (1930–2020), Brazilian gynecologist
- Roel Coutinho (born 1946), Dutch medical doctor and microbiologist

== Others ==
- Alex Coutinho (born 1959), Ugandan physician
- Álvaro Coutinho Aguirre (1899–1987), Brazilian agriculturalist and zoologist
- Diogo de Melo Coutinho (15th century), Portuguese navigator
- Duarte Borges Coutinho (1921–1981), 26th president of S.L. Benfica
- Gago Coutinho (1869–1959), Portuguese aviator
- José Bezerra Coutinho (1910–2008), Brazilian bishop
- José Joaquim da Cunha de Azeredo Coutinho (1742–1821), Portuguese bishop
- Luciano Coutinho (born 1948), Brazilian economist
- Luke Coutinho, Indian entrepreneur, author and lifestyle guru
- Maju Coutinho (born 1978), Brazilian journalist, television presenter, and commentator
- Mariana Joaquina Pereira Coutinho (1748–1820), Portuguese courtier and salonist
