= Álvaro Vaz de Almada, 1st Count of Avranches =

Portuguese knight and nobleman

Álvaro Vaz de Almada
- Count of Avranches
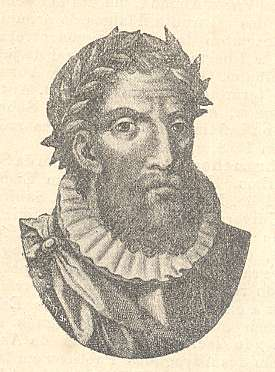

Count of Avranches
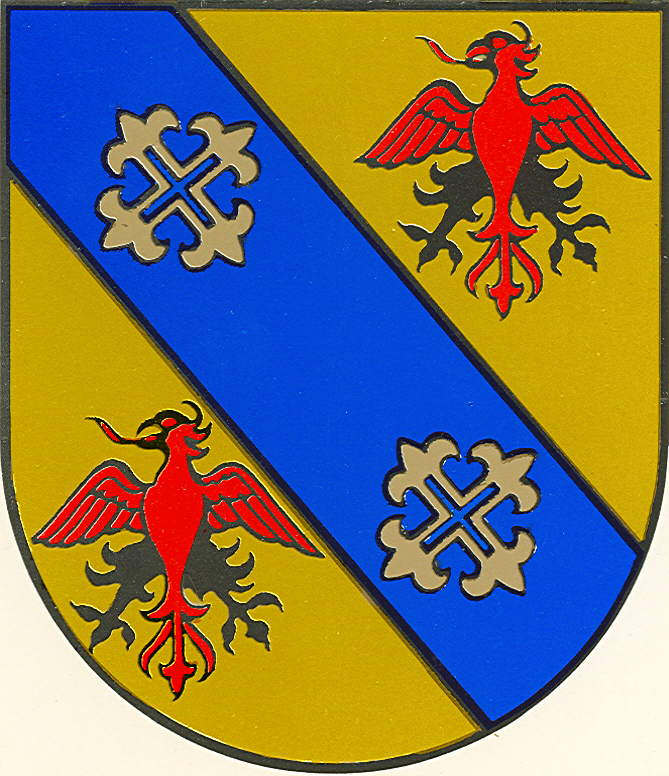
- Coat of arms
- Tenure: 4 August 1445 – 20 May 1449
- Successor: Fernando de Almada
- Born: 1390; Kingdom of Portugal
- Died: 20 May 1449 (aged 58–59); Alverca do Ribatejo, Portugal
- Family: Almada
- Spouse: Catarina de Ataíde
- Issue more...: Fernando, 2nd Count of Avranches
- Father: João Vaz de Almada

Álvaro Vaz de Almada, 1st Count of Avranches (c. 1390 – 20 May 1449) was a Portuguese knight and nobleman, with a long and illustrious career abroad in England. He was invested by the English king, Henry VI as the 1st Count of Avranches (in Portuguese: Conde de Abranches) and made a Knight of the Garter.

He was captain-general of the city of Lisbon and he died at the Battle of Alfarrobeira in 1449.

His likeness appeared on the now-obsolete Portuguese five-escudo banknote.

He is sometimes referred to with the wrong name Albro Vasques d' Almadea Earl of Averence.

== Early life ==
Dom Álvaro, one of the last to use the Portuguese title of rico homem, was the son of João Vaz de Almada (born around 1360) and his wife, Joana Anes. The Almadas were not of noble blood, but descended from a merchant family that made their fortune in overseas trade. The Lordship of Almada they had acquired was expropriated during the 1383–1385 Crisis, although João Vaz's notable military service to John I of Portugal earned him partial reinstatement and rewards in other districts. The family resided primarily in Lisbon and Algés. Álvaro had a younger brother named Pedro Vaz de Almada and two half-siblings, born out of wedlock, by an unknown mother: João Vaz de Almada, 1st Lord of Pereira (born c. 1400) and Brites de Almada.

At an early age, Álvaro accompanied his father to the Kingdom of England. Both were said to have fought in the Hundred Years' War and built up a rapport with King Henry V of England, before returning to Portugal in early 1415.

== Career ==
Shortly after returning from England, Álvaro fought alongside his father at the conquest of Ceuta in 1415, and was knighted in the aftermath by the Portuguese royal prince Peter, Duke of Coimbra. This was the beginning of a long association and friendship between the two men.

In June 1423, Álvaro was appointed by John I of Portugal as capitão-mor da frota (admiral of the sail fleet). The letter of appointment gave him unusually extensive powers, encroaching on areas normally reserved to the Admiral of Portugal (admiral of the galley fleet), thereby making Almada the de facto head of the entire Portuguese navy.

In the late 1420s, Álvaro Vaz de Almada accompanied Peter, Duke of Coimbra on his famous tour of Europe, and fought alongside him against the Turks in Hungary on behalf of Emperor Sigismund. He was back in Portugal by 1433, when his term as capitão-mor was renewed. He participated in several small naval encounters off Ceuta. During the 1430s, he was rewarded by King Edward of Portugal with more sinecures, including a share of the taxes imposed on the Jews of the kingdom.

Álvaro Vaz de Almada was one of the leaders of the ill-fated 1437 Tangier expedition. Organized and led by Prince Henry the Navigator, the expedition was a fiasco. After several hopeless assaults on the walls of Tangier, the Portuguese expeditionary force was defeated and starved into submission by the Marinid armies of Morocco. Nonetheless, Almada distinguished himself in the encounter, and was given the honor (shared with the marshal, Vasco Fernandes Coutinho) of being the last man to leave the beach.

During the regency crisis of 1438–39, Álvaro Vaz de Almada was one of the first to line up behind Peter of Coimbra, and instrumental in gathering more supporters to his cause. During the popular tumults, in September 1439, the people of Lisbon elected Almada as the alferes-mor (standard-bearer) and spokesman of the city. In recognition of his efforts, the new regent Peter appointed Almada as a member of his royal council and alcaide-mor of the Castle of São Jorge in Lisbon in April, 1440.

== England ==
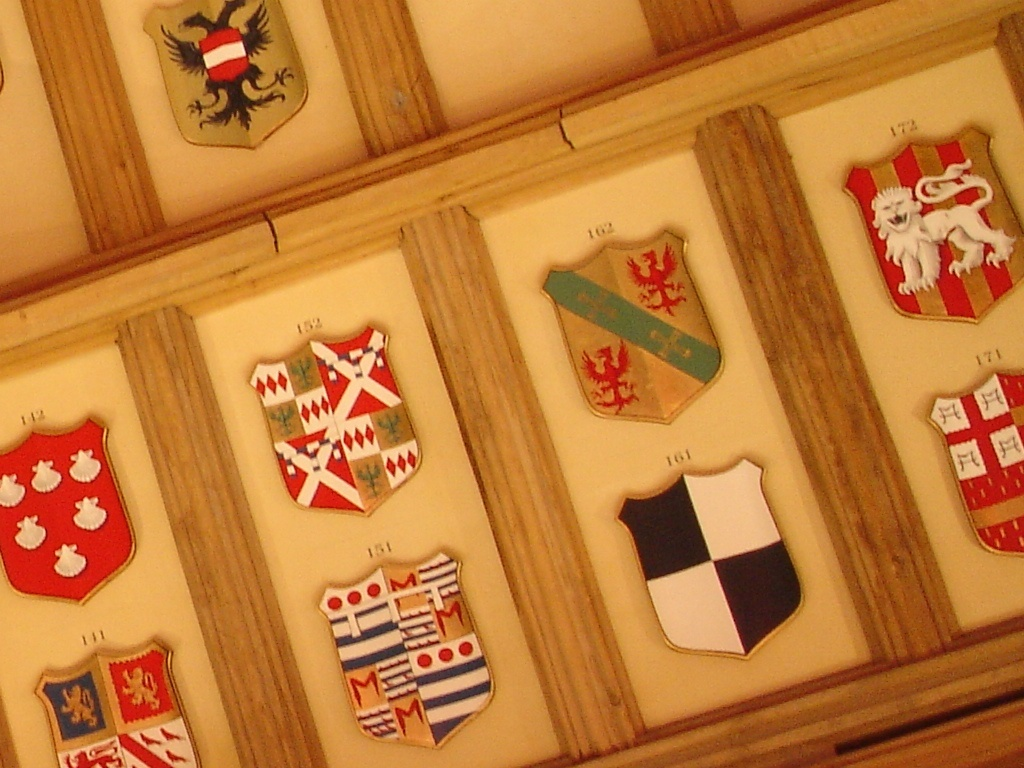
Dom Álvaro Vaz de Almada's coat-of-arms (nr. 162) displayed at St. George's Hall, Windsor Castle. He was made the 162nd Knight of the Garter.

Álvaro Vaz de Almada returned to England after 1415 but it is not known how often or when. On August 8, 1445 King Henry VI of England issued a royal letter ennobling Álvaro Vaz de Almada as the 1st Count of Avranches. Avranches was one of the few remaining Plantagenet ruled towns in Normandy; the title was translated by Portuguese writers as the Conde de Abranches. The letter cited his distinguished service to the English crown in the reigns of both Henry V and Henry VI. Simultaneously, he was appointed the 162nd Knight of the Most Noble Order of the Garter in 1445. Almada was one of the few foreigners not of royal blood to become a member of the illustrious English knightly order, and the only Portuguese to receive a hereditary English title. In addition to these honors, Henry VI granted Almada an annual life pension of one hundred marks, as well as a gift, a gold cup with one hundred gold marks inside.

News of Almada's career in England filtered inchoately into the Portuguese popular chivalric legend of the Twelve of England (Os Doze de Inglaterra). A semi-legendary tale made famous by Luís de Camões in his Os Lusíadas, it is set during the reign of John I, and relates how twelve (or thirteen) Portuguese knights went to England to repair an offense made to some ladies of the household of John of Gaunt, Duke of Lancaster. Almada is traditionally identified as one of the twelve knights (even though the year proposed by the legend - if it happened at all - would have been c.1390, when Almada was merely a newborn infant.)

== The Battle of Alfarrobeira ==
In 1448, King Afonso V of Portugal reached majority and dismissed the regency of Peter of Coimbra. However, under the influence of Afonso of Barcelos-Braganza, the king immediately set about undoing all of Peter's regency acts and dismissing all his appointees, often accompanied by dubious legal proceedings to further dispossess them. The vacated nobles and bureaucrats turned to Peter for redress.

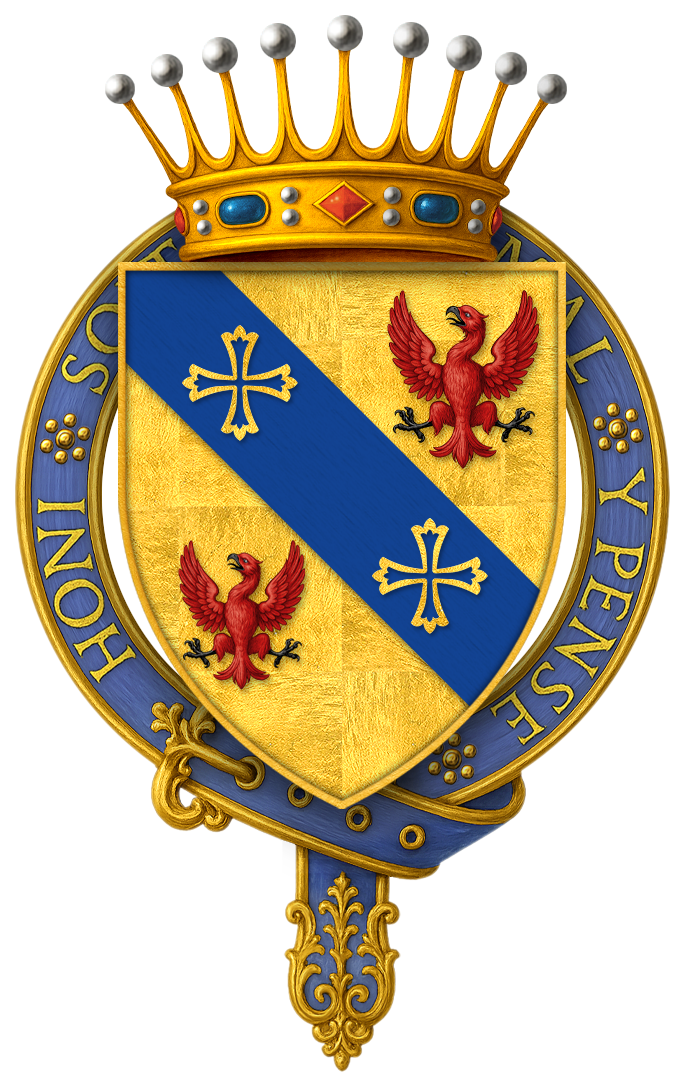

Álvaro Vaz de Almada, then in Ceuta, returned to Portugal in September 1448, to support the embattled Peter. For daring to speak up in Peter's defense in court, Almada was dispossessed of the alcaide of Lisbon in December, 1448. Almada further enraged the king by leading a contingent of Peter's retainers to Coja, on the edge of Peter's Duchy of Coimbra, to block the passage of Afonso of Barcelos-Braganza through his friend's property. Although Afonso was carrying more men, the military reputation of Almada was such that Afonso decided to take a circuitous route rather than force the issue.

In May, 1449, Peter of Coimbra, accompanied by Almada, set out from Coimbra, leading his men in a march on Lisbon - according to Peter, a peaceful march to demand that he and his dismissed appointees be given a chance to defend themselves in court. But Afonso of Barcelos-Braganza warned that Peter and Almada were intending to lay siege to Lisbon, and would likely use their connections to provoke an uprising within the city. Afonso V, alarmed, declared them rebels and traitors and set out with an army against him. Almada's own half-brother, João Vaz de Almada (Lord of Pereira and vedor of palace) was among the king's host.

The armies met on May 20, 1449, at the Battle of Alfarrobeira (around Alverca do Ribatejo). It is said that Peter and Almada had sworn a personal oath not to survive each other. Peter was killed early in the encounter. Almada, hearing the news from a page, ordered him not to reveal it to the rest of the army. Then, after taking brief refreshment, Almada (who was now in his fifties) marched forward into the thick of the fight. Soon recognized, Almada was quickly surrounded by the king's soldiers, but refused to surrender. He struck down all who approached him, until, at last, exhausted, he uttered his famous exclamation "My body, I feel you can no more; and you, my soul, already delay." ("Meu corpo, sinto que não podes mais; e tu, minh' alma, já tardas."), lowered his weapon and fell to the ground, spitting out his famous last words "now indulge yourselves, villains" ("Ora fartar villanagem", now a common Portuguese expression). His enemies fell upon him and finished him.

On the king's orders, Almada's body was left decapitated on the battlefield, exposed to the elements, to decay in the open. Only upon the repeated entreaties of João Vaz de Almada, did king Afonso V finally consent to allow him to bury his brother's corpse.

Nonetheless, legal proceedings continued against Almada, and much of his property was confiscated. The family seat of Algés went to João Vaz de Almada, while much of the remainder was given to the king's counsellor Álvaro Pires de Távora.

Almada's widow, Catarina de Castro (daughter of Fernando de Castro) was only allowed to retain possession of their Lisbon homes as well as the Jewish taxes. Almada's oldest son João de Abranches (from Almada's first marriage, who attached "Abranches" to his surname albeit not possessing the title), inherited what remained of his father's pre-1385 estates that could not be confiscated by the crown.

The title of 2nd Count of Abranches and capitão-mor da frota was (eventually) recovered by Fernando de Almada, the only son of Almada's second marriage to Catarina de Castro.

== Marriage and children ==
Álvaro Vaz de Almada married twice.

From his first marriage (before 2 January 1436) to Isabel da Cunha (daughter of Álvaro da Cunha, 3rd Lord of Pombeiro, and Beatriz de Melo), Almada had the following children:

- Dom João de Abranches (b. c. 1420), married first to Leonor ..., without issue, and married second to his distant relative Mécia da Cunha (daughter of Vasco da Cunha and wife Maria Rodrigues de Azevedo), and had issue
- Dona Leonor da Cunha, a Nun
- Dona Violante da Cunha (b. c. 1430), married as his first wife to Dom Fernão Martins Mascarenhas, 1st Lord of Lavre and 1st Lord of Estepa (b. c. 1430, d. 1501) (son of Nuno Vaz Mascarenhas and wife Catarina de Ataíde), without issue
- Dona Isabel da Cunha (b. 1420), married as his first wife to Álvaro Pessanha (b. c. 1415) (a bastard son of Carlos Pessanha, 6th Admiral of Portugal, by an unknown woman), and had issue
- Dona Brites da Cunha, married to the English nobleman Sir ... de Mabermont

Isabel da Cunha died before Almada was ennobled with County of Avranches. Nonetheless, their eldest son attached and used "Abranches" in his surname (he did not inherit the title, however).

From his second marriage (on August 4, 1445) to Dona Catarina de Castro (daughter of Dom Fernando de Castro, governor of the household of Prince Henry the Navigator and his wife Isabel de Ataíde):

- Fernando de Almada, 2nd Count of Avranches (b. c. 1430, d. April 29, 1496), married in 1463 to Dona Constança de Noronha, 5th Lady of Lagares de El-Rei (b. c. 1435), and had issue, also had two children born out of wedlock by an unknown mother

Almada's second wife, Catarina de Castro, later remarried her first cousin, Dom Martinho de Ataíde, 2nd Count of Atouguia (with no issue).

The Avranches/Abranches are sometimes confused with unrelated families named after "Abrantes", a town in Portugal.

== Sources ==
- Costa Lôbo, A. (1904) Historia da sociedade em Portugal no seculo XV Lisbon: Imprensa nacional online
- Moreno, H.B. (1980) A Batalha de Alfarrobeira: antecedentes e significado histórico, 2 vols., Coimbra University, esp. p.999ff.
- Quintella, Ignaco da Costa (1839–40) Annaes da Marinha Portugueza, 2 vols, Lisbon: Academia Real das Sciencias. vol. 1
- Various, "Nobreza de Portugal e do Brasil", Lisbon, Portugal, 1960, Volume Segundo, pp. 356–357
- Various, "Armorial Lusitano", Lisbon, Portugal, 1961, pp. 26–27 and pp. 42–43
- Visconde de Figanière, "Alguns Documentos Acerca do Conde de Avranches", in Panorama, 3rd Series, Vol. V, Nr. 9

== External sources ==
- Knights of the Garter, Roglo
