= Gonçalo Vasques Coutinho, 2nd Marshal of Portugal =

Portuguese nobleman (1360s-1410s)

Gonçalo Vasques Coutinho
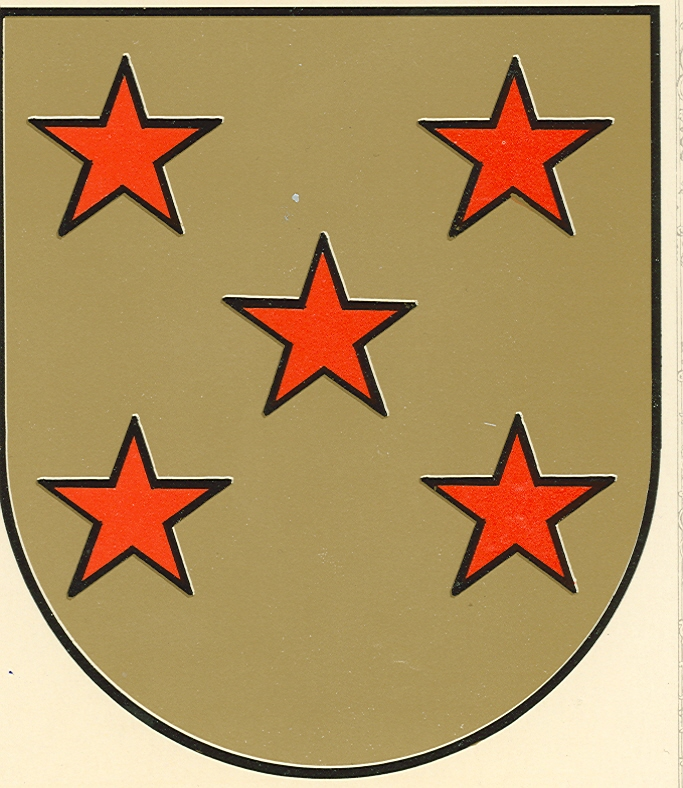
- Arms of Coutinho

2nd Marshal of Portugal
- Monarch: John I

Personal details
- Born: c.1360 Portugal
- Died: 1421 Portugal
- Occupation: Politician
- Profession: Army's officer

Military service
- Allegiance: Kingdom of Portugal
- Branch/service: Portuguese Army
- Battles/wars: Battle of Trancoso

Gonçalo Vasques Coutinho (1360s–1410s) was a Portuguese nobleman, 2nd Marshal of Portugal, who served as alcaide-mór of Trancoso and Lamego.

== Biography ==
Gonçalo Vasques Coutinho was born in Portugal, son of Vasco Fernandes Coutinho and Beatriz Gonçalves de Moura, belonging to the Lusitanian nobility. He served as Copeiro-mor of Philippa of Lancaster, the Queen consort of Portugal.

Coutinho was a distinguished military man, who participated in the Battle of Trancoso. He also served as alcaide of Trancoso and Lamego.

Coutinho was married twice, first with Leonor Gonçalves de Azevedo, daughter of Gonçalo Vasques de Azevedo and Inês Afonso. And second to Joana de Albuquerque, daughter of Fernando Afonso de Albuquerque, alcaide da Guarda, and an English lady, Laura.
