= Count of Marialva =

The coat-of-arms of the Coutinho family, Counts of Marialva.

The Count of Marialva (Portuguese: Conde de Marialva) was a Portuguese title of nobility created by a royal decree, issued in 1440, by King Afonso V of Portugal, and granted to Vasco Fernandes Coutinho (from a family descendency dating to the old Portuguese nobility), the third Marshal of Portugal.

== List of counts ==
1. Vasco Fernandes Coutinho (1385);
2. Gonçalo Coutinho, 2nd Count of Marialva (1415);
3. João Coutinho, 3rd Count of Marialva (1450);
4. Francisco Coutinho, 4th Count of Marialva (1480), married to Beatriz de Meneses, 2nd Countess of Loulé;
5. Guiomar Coutinho, 5th Countess of Marialva (1510), 3rd Countess of Loulé, who married Fernando, Duke of Guarda.
