= The Twelve of England =

Portuguese chivalric legend

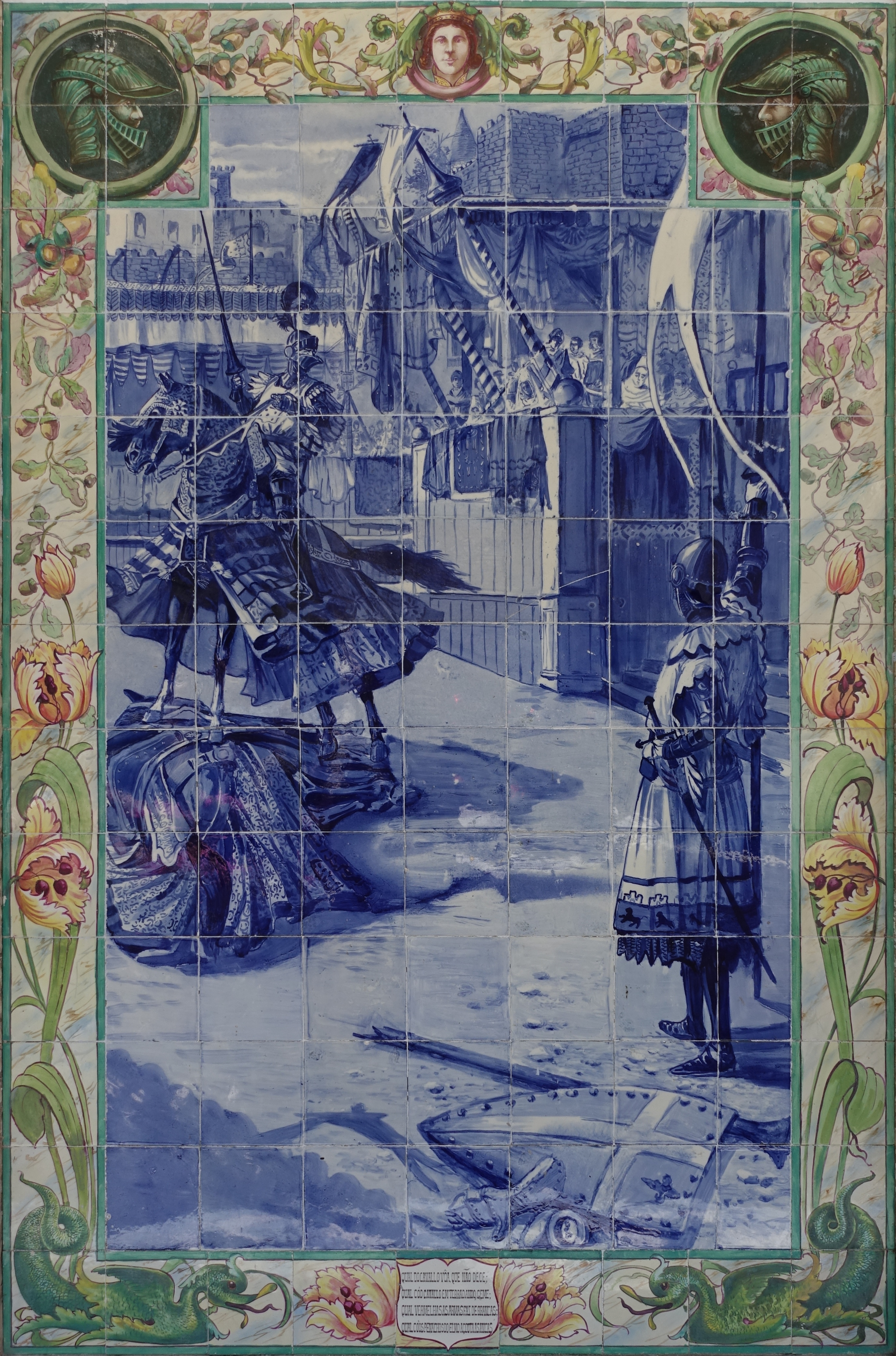
Azulejo panel by Jorge Colaço at Buçaco Palace, depicting the tournament at Smithfield: "This, from his charger not dismounting flies; that groaneth falling with his falling steed; this hath his snow-white mail with vermeil dyed; that, with his helm-plume flogs his courser's side." (The Lusiads, Canto VI, verse 64)

The Twelve of England (in Portuguese: Os Doze de Inglaterra) is a Portuguese chivalric legend of 15th-century origin, famously related by the poet Luís de Camões in his 1572 Os Lusíadas (Canto VI). It tells the story of twelve Portuguese knights who travelled to England at the request of twelve English ladies to avenge their insult by a group of English knights.

== Legend ==
According to the legend, in the 1390s, twelve English knights insulted twelve ladies-in-waiting of the household of the Duchess of Lancaster. The ladies appealed to their master, John of Gaunt, Duke of Lancaster, but he was unable to find any English champions to defend the honor of the ladies. The twelve offending knights, renowned for their martial prowess, were too widely feared. Recalling his Iberian campaigns of the 1370s and 1380s, and the bravery of the Portuguese knights he encountered there, Lancaster recommended that they search for a champion among them.

In one version of the legend, John of Gaunt wrote down the names of twelve Portuguese knights from memory, had the ladies draw lots to be matched with a knight, and then had each of the ladies write a letter of appeal to their champion. John of Gaunt wrote a separate letter himself to his son-in-law, John I of Portugal, asking him to grant the Portuguese knights permission to travel to England for this noble endeavor.

(In another version, related in Teófilo Braga's poem, John the Gaunt made an open request to John I, and scores of Portuguese knights applied, from which twelve were selected from an urn by Queen Philippa of Lancaster in Sintra. Their exact match with an English lady was sorted later - John of Gaunt shuffled the anonymous chivalric mottoes of the twelve knights, and had each of the twelve ladies select one, only learning the exact identify of their champion afterwards.)

The twelve were scheduled to set out by ship from Porto, but one of them, Álvaro Gonçalves Coutinho, nicknamed o Magriço (the Lean One) told the others to go ahead without him, that he would make his way overland via Spain and France.

The eleven knights set sail from Porto and landed in England, where they were well received in London by the Duke of Lancaster and the ladies, but there was great nervousness about whether Magriço would arrive on time. Magriço travelled overland at a languid pace, taking time to meander on the route, and visit various curious locations along the way.

When the day of the tournament arrived, legendarily held at Smithfield, London, there was still no news of Magriço, leaving the damsel destined to be defended by him (named 'Ethwalda' in one version) quite distraught. But just as the fight was about to be enjoined, Magriço arrived on the scene with great fanfare, just in time to take his position alongside his compatriots, heartening the distressed lady.

The twelve Portuguese champions successfully dispatched the offending English knights that day, in what was characterized as an unusually hard and brutal fight. The ladies' honor was successfully defended. But a few of the English knights had been killed in the tournament field, and in the aftermath, the Portuguese were threatened with revenge by the friends of the fallen. Fearful of being betrayed if they lingered in England, the Portuguese knights applied to John of Gaunt to secure them passage back to Portugal quickly. However, Magriço, still possessed by a spirit of adventure, decided to linger on in northern Europe, and eventually entered the service of the Count of Flanders for some time. Álvaro Vaz de Almada also went on adventures in continental Europe (legendarily engaging in a duel with a German knight in Basel).

== Origins ==
The legend of the "Twelve of England" was famously related by Portuguese poet Luís de Camões in his 1572 epic poem Os Lusíadas. In Canto VI, Stanzas 40-69, while Vasco da Gama's fleet was crossing the Indian Ocean, a soldier named Fernão Veloso regales his fellow Portuguese sailors with the story of the "Twelve of England" to pass the time and inspire their bravery.

Historians have found some versions of the legend prior to Camões's telling, notably a mid-15th-century manuscript known as Cavalarias de Alguns Fidalgos Portugueses. Jorge Ferreira de Vasconcelos's 1567 Memorial das Proezas da Segunda Tavola Redonda (which precedes Camões by a few years) briefly mentions that 'thirteen' (not twelve) Portuguese knights were dispatched to England "to defend the ladies of the Duke of Lancaster". The summaries by Pedro de Mariz (1598) and Manuel Correia (1613), although published after Camões, seem to rest on pre-Camões sources. The legend was retold in various versions after Camões, with occasional embellishments and variations.

=== The twelve ===
The identities of the twelve of the legend have been subject to speculation. An early 17th-century commentator Manuel Correia names five (Coutinho, Almada, Agostim, Lopo Pacheco, and Pedro Homem) while the remaining seven were identified in a 1732 tract by Védouro. Although many Portuguese noble families would later claim an ancestor of theirs was among the twelve, expanding the list enormously, the following is most generally accepted list of the twelve:

Named by Correia:

- Álvaro Gonçalves Coutinho, nicknamed o grão Magriço, son of the Marshal of Portugal Gonçalo Vasques Coutinho, and brother of Vasco Fernandes Coutinho, 1st Count of Marialva
- Álvaro Vaz de Almada, future Count of Avranches. Would have been a child at the time.
- João Pereira da Cunha Agostim, second son of Gil Vasques da Cunha (alferes mór, of John I), and thus nephew of the Constable of Portugal Nuno Álvares Pereira, nicknamed 'Agostim' for having killed an English knight of that name in a duel.
- Lopo Fernandes Pacheco
- Pedro Homem da Costa

Added by Védouro (and Soares da Silva)

- Álvaro Mendes Cerveira
- Rui Mendes Cerveira, brother of the above
- Soeiro da Costa, alcaide-mor of Lagos, Algarve, future captain of Prince Henry the Navigator. Improbably young at this time.
- Luís Gonçalves Malafaia, future ambassador of John II of Portugal to the court of Castile; also improbably young.
- Martim Lopes de Azevedo
- Rui Gomes da Silva, possibly the future alcaide of Campo Maior, son of Aires Gomes da Silva, father of St. Beatrix da Silva
- Álvaro de Almada, nicknamed the Justador, - according to Silva, a nephew of the Count of Avranches, but some other authors assume it is just a confused repetition of Avranches himself.

Common alternates to the above list are:

- João Fernandes Pacheco, lord of Ferreira de Aves, brother of Lopo Fernandes Pacheco, progenitor of the Dukes of Escalona in Castile - commonly substituted in place of Almada 'o Justador'.
- Vasco Annes da Costa, the first named "Corte-Real", fronteiro-mor of Tavira in the Algarve, ancestor of the Corte-Real explorers and captains of Terceira Island of the Azores - to bring the number up to 'thirteen', as originally stated by Vasconcelos.

In Teófilo Braga's 1902 poem, the twelve English knights are named as Austin (killed in the opening fight by Álvaro Vaz de Almada), Athelard, Blundell, Loveday, Argenton, Clarency, Corleville, Otenel, Turneville, Morley, Glaston and Reginald (who fought Magriço in the last fight). The twelve English ladies are also named: Adhelm, Egberte, Oswalda, Jorceline, Luce, Florence, Egwin, Gotslina, Gerlanda, Ailmer, Tatwine and Ethwalda (Magriço's lady). These names are purely literary fictions by Braga, with no known historical counterparts.

== History ==
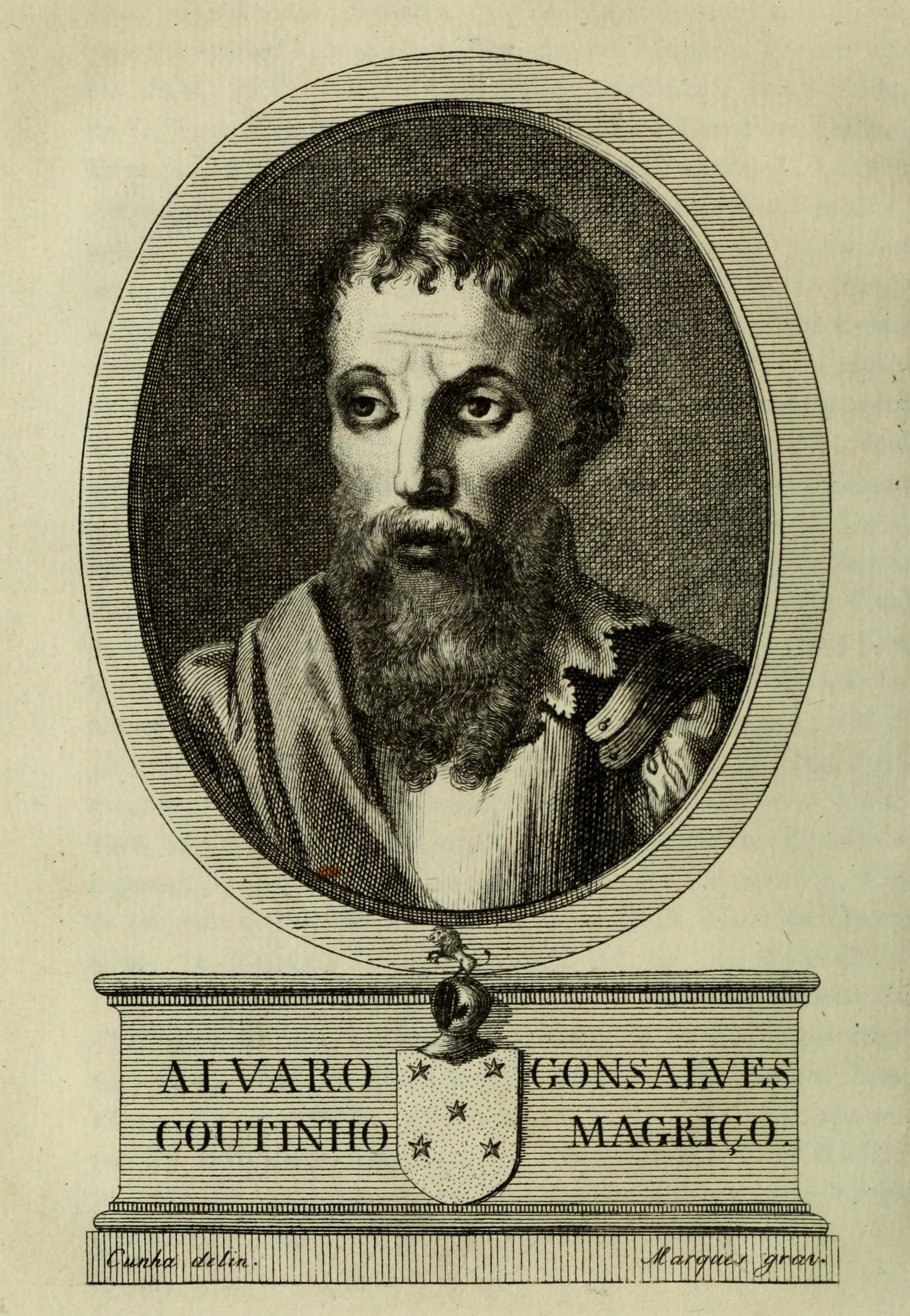
Álvaro Gonçalves Coutinho, o Magriço

While the particulars of the legend are doubtlessly fanciful, there may be some (slim) historical basis for such an encounter If such an event happened, it would have to be sometime after 1387 (when the Anglo-Portuguese alliance was sealed by the marriage of John I of Portugal and Philippa of Lancaster, daughter of John of Gaunt) and before the death of John the Gaunt in 1399. Narrowing the window further, it was probably sometime after 1389, when John of Gaunt returned to England from his failed Iberian campaign, and before the death of John of Gaunt's wife, the Duchess of Lancaster, Constance of Castile in 1394. The common date frequently cited is 1390. In the location cited by Teófilo Braga of Smithfield, in London, also occurred a large and very famous tournament held by Richard II in 1390.

The Duchess's Castilian nationality may lend credence to such an event, and her twelve ladies-in-waiting were also, likely, Castilian rather than English, which may explain John of Gaunt's difficulty in finding English champions to pick up arms against their English brethren in their defense. The early 1390s also marks a difficult period in John of Gaunt's political life, at a low point in his fortunes, trying to navigate an England riven with great tension between King Richard II and the English nobility. With the humiliating failure in Iberia still stinging, it was not unlikely disgruntled English knights might have taken to poking at the Duke of Lancaster and his household, in particular the Castilian Duchess who could be blamed for the hare-brained Iberian adventure to begin with. Finally, it is possible that if the event happened as early as 1389-1390, Lancaster may not have had to send to Portugal for knights, but may have had a few already in his entourage - Portuguese knights who served with him in the Castilian campaign and accompanied him to England, possibly as a bodyguard when John of Gaunt was still uncertain as to what kind of reception he might receive at home. Add a few others from his son-in-law's embassy, and there might have been enough Portuguese knights in England at the time to engage in some sort of tournament over some offense against Lancaster's household.

Setting the event in the early 1390s, however, eliminates many of the identified twelve, who were merely children at the time, if born at all. But it is probably safe to assume that the list is largely fanciful and anachronistic anyway. Most of the named knights were known to have gone abroad at some point - e.g. Álvaro Vaz de Almada served for a long time in England and was made a Knight of the Garter and Count of Avranches in 1445; Soeiro da Costa fought in Aragon and Italy in the early 15th century, and was at the Battle of Agincourt in 1415; Álvaro Gonçalves Coutinho, Magriço himself, is reported to have fought in tournaments in France. The French chronicle of Enguerrand de Monstrelet records a chivalric fight (over women) in Saint-Ouen in 1414 between three Portuguese knights (named simply D. Álvares, D. João and D. Pedro Gonçalves) and three Gascon knights (François de Grignols, Archambaud de la Roque and Maurignon). News of the feats of various Portuguese knights abroad in different countries - filtered back home in the early 15th century and somehow, inchoately and anachronistically, congealed in popular memory into a single English tournament set around 1390.

Another influence in this story is the rise of the Arthurian legend, probably brought to the Portuguese court by Philippa of Lancaster. The story of the "Twelve of England" evokes the image of John I of Portugal, as some sort of Portuguese King Arthur, sending out his knights of the Round Table in feats of chivalry, saving distant damsels in distress (a marked change from the old reconquista tales of battling Moors.) The number - twelve - is also not accidental. As pointed out by Camões himself, it happens to match the Twelve Peers of Charlemagne, that other great source of chivalric literature, re-popularized in the 16th century by Boiardo and Ariosto ("For the Twelve Peers, I put forth the Twelve of England, and their Magriço", Camões Lusiadas, Canto I, Stanza 12).

== Cultural references ==
In the 1820s, Portuguese Romantic poet Almeida Garrett worked for many years on an extended poem, Magriço ou Os Doze de Inglaterra, which used the story of the twelve as a device for wider philosophical meanderings, which was never completed. Many decades later, in 1902, Teófilo Braga composed his own more straightforward poetic version of the story of the twelve, with a more nationalist tone, apparently inspired by his research into Camões and Garrett, but also possibly motivated by the 1890 British Ultimatum, which had provoked a strong anti-British feeling in republican-nationalist circles in Portugal at that time.

The legend took a new life when the Portugal national football team made their debut at the 1966 FIFA World Cup hosted in England. Led by eventual top-scorer Eusébio, they reached third place in the tournament. The Portuguese newspaper press gave the fabled team the nickname Os Magriços, in reference to the "Twelve of England". Although the legend was familiar to the Portuguese public, it became even more prominent in the aftermath of the World Cup campaign.
