= Francisco Coutinho, 4th Count of Marialva =

Portuguese nobleman

Francisco de Melo Coutinho
- Conde de Marialva
- brasão of Coutinho
- Born: 1465; Guarda, Portugal
- Died: 1532 (aged 66–67); Portugal
- Noble family: Melo Coutinho

Francisco Coutinho (1465-1532) Count of Marialva and Loulé, was a Portuguese nobleman, who served to the Portuguese monarchy, during the reign of John II.

== Biography ==
Francisco was the son of Gonçalo Coutinho, 2nd Count of Marialva and Beatriz de Melo, a noble lady, belonging to the Portuguese nobility. Through his mother, he was a descendant of the kings of Castile and Portugal. By paternal line he also comes from the Portuguese royal house, being a descendant of Diogo Afonso de Sousa, a knight, who belonged to the Order of Christ, and whose paternal grandfather was king Afonso III.

Francisco Coutinho was married to Brites de Menezes, (condessa of Loulé), daughter of Henrique de Meneses and Guiomar de Bragança.
