= Eduarda Lapa =

Portuguese feminist painter

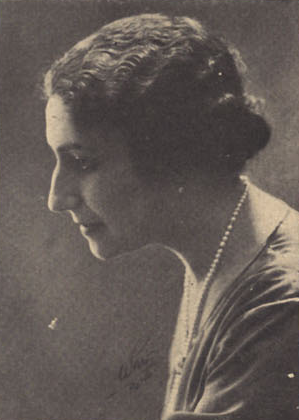
- Lapa in 1929
- Born: Maria Eduarda Lapa de Sousa Caldeira; 15 October 1895; Trancoso, Portugal
- Died: 9 September 1976 (aged 80); Lisbon, Portugal
- Occupation: Artist
- Known for: Painter of flowers

Eduarda Lapa (1895 — 1976) was a painter and painting teacher who specialized in naturalist painting, especially still life, becoming known as the "flower painter" and the "ambassador of colours". An active feminist, she was the first woman to join the board of the Portuguese National Society of Fine Arts.

== Early life ==
Maria Eduarda Lapa de Sousa Caldeira was born on 15 October 1895, in Trancoso, Portugal. She came from a middle-class family and was the daughter of Ernesto Coutinho de Vilhena de Sousa Caldeira and Laura de Almeida Lapa. At a young age, she moved to Coimbra with her parents. Having shown a considerable artistic talent, she went to Porto to study with Artur Loureiro, before moving in 1922 to Lisbon to study with Emília dos Santos Braga. However, it was Armando de Lucena in Lisbon who introduced her to naturalism, by encouraging her to draw outdoors, and to visit Lisbon's Jardim da Estrela (Estrela Gardens) for inspiration.

Between 1917 and 1928 she exhibited at several shows in Portugal, including at Trancoso, Coimbra, Lisbon, Leiria, Viseu, Porto, and, in 1928, in Rio de Janeiro in Brazil. The reception of her paintings by reviewers in periodicals and magazines was very positive and it was during this period that she was dubbed the "flower painter", whereas it was in Rio de Janeiro that she was called the "ambassador of colours".

== Study in Paris ==
In 1930, encouraged by José Malhoa, who had been Braga's teacher, Lapa decided to go to Paris, where she studied at the Académie de la Grande Chaumière, the Académie Ranson at Émile Renard's atelier and at the Académie Moderne, then directed by the painters Henry Royer and Jean Marchand. During her stay in France, she became friends with the painters Helena Pereira da Silva and her husband Ryokai Ohashi, Waldemar da Costa, Árpád Szenes and Maria Helena Vieira da Silva, with whom she would later share a studio in Lisbon.

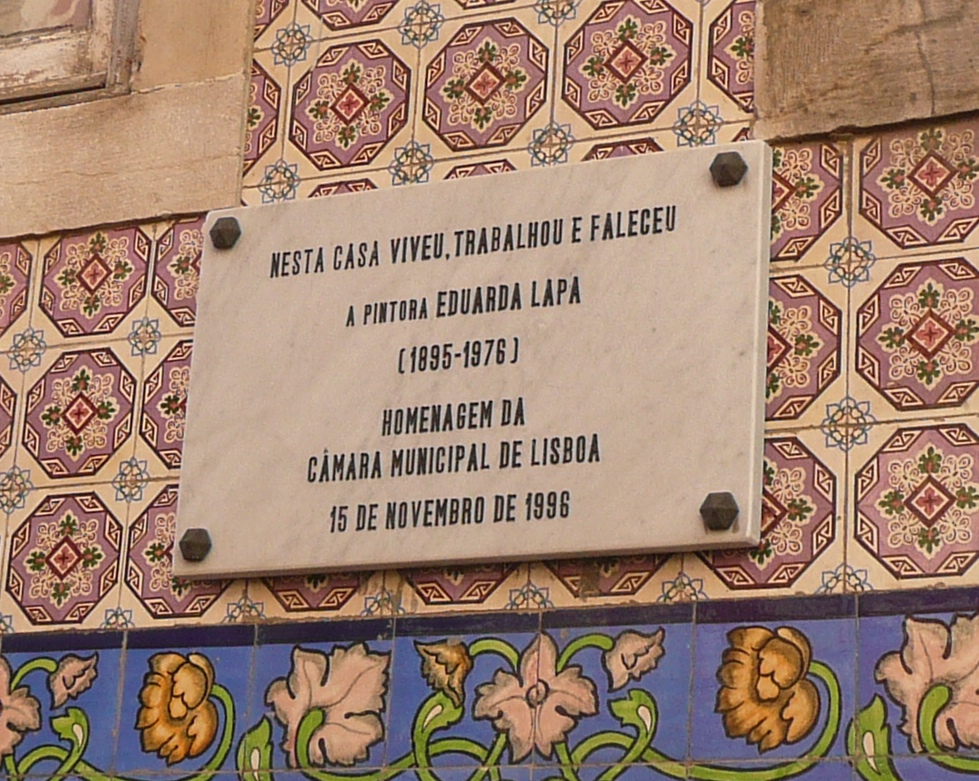
Commemorative plaque at Lapa's former home

== National Council of Portuguese Women ==
On her return to Portugal, she was interviewed by the media, at which time she expressed her concern that there were few female artists, partly because they were not allowed by their husbands to pursue an artistic career or, indeed, any career. She also complained about "salons" that refused to exhibit women artists. After reading such comments, Maria Lamas of the feminist Conselho Nacional das Mulheres Portuguesas (National Council of Portuguese Women - CNMP) invited Lapa to join the CNMP. Lapa participated in several CNMP initiatives and chaired its Art section in 1939. In 1940, she became one of the driving forces behind the creation of the Guarda Museum, near her home town of Trancoso, to which she donated some of her works and organized the inaugural exhibition. Two years later, she organized in Lisbon the first Female Exhibition of Plastic Arts held in Portugal, with the support of the CNMP. She became a member of the National Society of Fine Arts, being the first woman to be on its board.

== Later life ==
In 1944 Lapa organized the exhibition Arte Naturalista Portuguesa. Continuing to exhibit at the Sociedade Nacional de Belas Artes, she won the first prize for Pastels in 1943, the first prize for oil paintings in 1944, and various other awards. She received the Gold Medal awarded by the Estoril Salon in 1950, and was represented at exhibitions in Seville, Spain in 1952 and Lourenço Marques, (now Maputo), in Mozambique in 1955.

Eduarda Lapa died on 9 September 1976, at her home in Lisbon. She is buried in the Alto de São João Cemetery, in the same city. Her works are represented in several museums in Portugal, namely the Guarda Museum, the Maritime Museum of Ílhavo, the José Malhoa Museum in Caldas da Rainha, the Grão Vasco National Museum in Viseu, the Soares dos Reis National Museum in Porto, and in the Museu do Chiado, the Calouste Gulbenkian Museum and the Lisbon Academy of Sciences, all in Lisbon.

== Awards and honours ==
- Lapa was awarded the Medal of Honour of the City of Lisbon in 1944.
- She was made an Officer of the Military Order of Saint James of the Sword (Portuguese: Real Ordem Militar de Santiago da Espada) in 1950.
- A commemorative plaque was unveiled by the Lisbon City Council on the building where Lapa lived and died, at Rua Capitão Renato Baptista.
- The Lisbon City Council gave her name to a street in the parish of Marvila. In addition to this tribute, there are streets named after her in Almada (parish of Charneca de Caparica), Cascais, Lourinhã, Corroios, Sesimbra, Tavira and Trancoso.
- In 2007, about 71 paintings and several personal objects by Eduarda Lapa, were donated to Trancoso, by Maria Manuela de Almeida Lapa e Passos, the artist's niece, to be exhibited at the Trancoso Cultural Center.
