= Beatriz de Meneses, 2nd Countess of Loulé =

Portuguese noblewoman

Beatriz de Meneses
- Countess
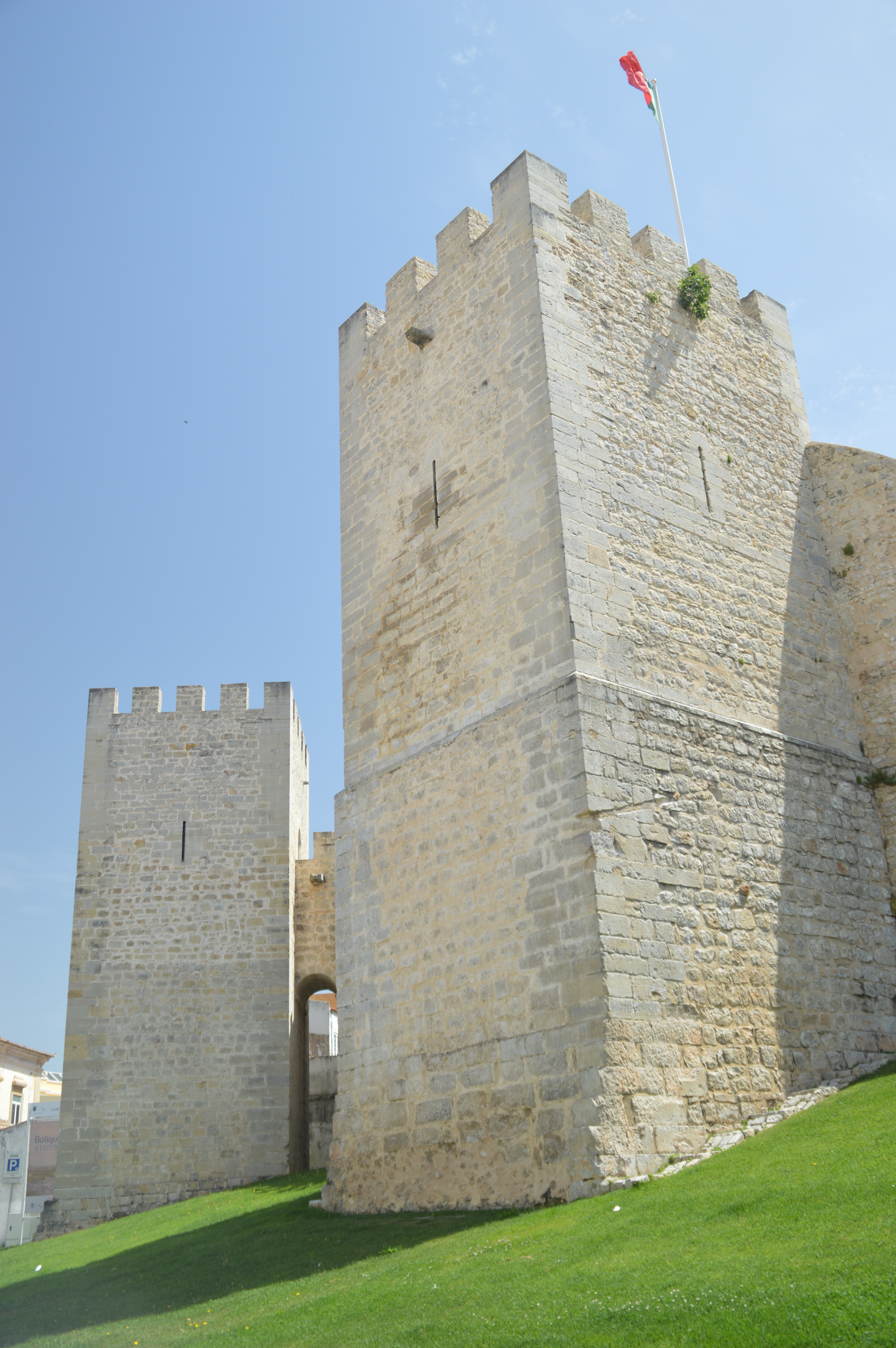
- Castle of Loulé
- Born: 15th century Guarda, Portugal
- Died: 16th century Guarda, Portugal
- Spouse: Francisco Coutinho

Brites or Beatriz de Meneses (c.1470-1530) Countess of Loulé and Marialva, was a Portuguese noblewoman, granddaughter of Fernando I, Duke of Braganza.

== Biography ==
She was born in Guarda, Portugal, daughter of Henrique de Meneses, 4th Count of Viana and Guiomar of Braganza, a noble lady, daughter of the Duke Fernando I and Joana de Castro, belonging to the powerful lineage of the House of Castro.

Beatriz de Meneses got married in the 1490s to Francisco Coutinho, 4th count of Marialva, with whom she had two children: Diogo Coutinho, husband of Joana Carvalho, and Guiomar Coutinho, who was married to Ferdinand of Portugal, Duke of Guarda, son of Manuel I and Maria of Aragon.
