= Trancoso Municipal Chamber =

Legislative body of Trancoso, Portugal

Coordinates: 40.77794°N 7.35047°W

Trancoso Municipal Chamber Câmara Municipal de Trancoso
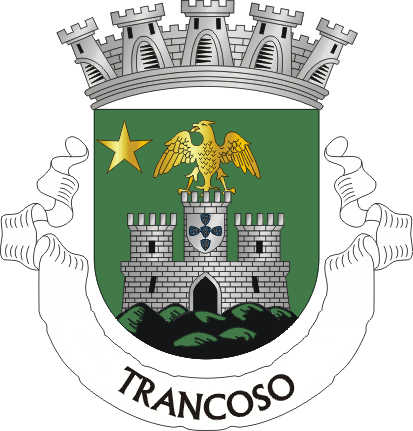
- Coat of arms of the city of Trancoso

Type
- Type: Câmara municipal
- Term limits: 3

History
- Founded: 1159; 866 years ago

Leadership
- President: Amílcar José Nunes Salvador, PS since 20 October 2021
- Vice President: Eduardo António Rebelo Pinto, PS since 20 October 2021

Structure
- Seats: 5
- Political groups: Municipal Executive (3) PS (3) Opposition (2) PSD (2)
- Length of term: Four years

Elections
- Last election: 26 September 2021
- Next election: Sometime between 22 September and 14 October 2025

Meeting place
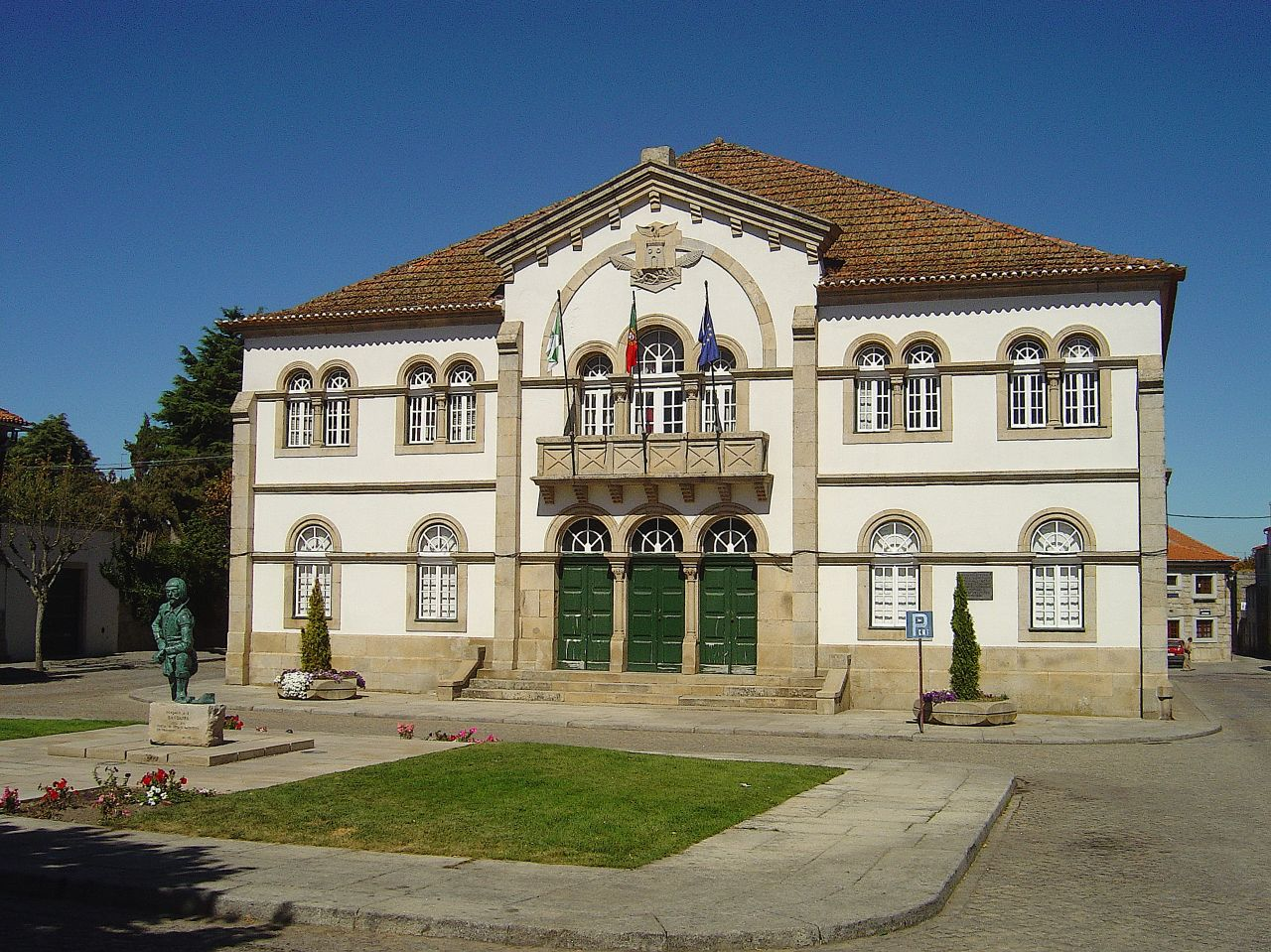
- Paços do Concelho de Trancoso

Website
- www.cm-trancoso.pt

The Trancoso Municipal Chamber (Portuguese: Câmara Municipal de Trancoso) is the administrative authority in the municipality of Trancoso. It has 21 freguesias in its area of jurisdiction and is based in the city of Trancoso, on the Guarda District. These freguesias are: Aldeia Nova; Castanheira; Cogula; Cótimos; Fiães; Freches e Torres; Granja; Guilheiro; Moimentinha; Moreira de Rei; Palhais; Póvoa do Concelho; Reboleiro; Rio de Mel; Tamanhos; Torre do Terrenho, Sebadelhe da Serra e Terrenho; Trancoso (São Pedro e Santa Maria) e Souto Maior; Valdujo; Vale do Seixo e Vila Garcia; Vila Franca das Naves e Feital and Vilares e Carnicães.

The Trancoso City Council is made up of 5 councillors, representing, currently, two different political forces. The first candidate on the list with the most votes in a municipal election or, in the event of a vacancy, the next candidate on the list, takes office as President of the Municipal Chamber.

== List of the Presidents of the Municipal Chamber of Trancoso ==
- António Almeida – (1976–1979)
- António Morgado Batista – (1979–1983)
- Inácio Pinto – (1983–1985)
- João Francisco Madeira – (1985)
- Júlio Sarmento – (1985–2013)
- Amílcar José Nunes Salvador – (2013–2025)

(The list is incomplete)
