= Fernando de Almada, 2nd Count of Avranches =

15th century Portuguese aristocrat

Fernando de Almada
- 2nd Count of Avranches
- Tenure: 1476 – 1496
- Predecessor: Álvaro Vaz de Almada, 1st Count of Avranches
- Successor: Antão de Almada, 3rd Count of Avranches
- Born: c. 1430
- Died: 29 April 1496 (aged 65–66)
- Spouse: Dona Constança de Noronha (m. 1463)
- Issue: Pedro de Almada; Antão de Almada, 6th Lord of Lagares de El-Rei; Isabel de Noronha e Castro; Beatriz Fernandes de Abranches; Rui Fernandes de Almada
- Father: Álvaro Vaz de Almada, 1st Count of Avranches
- Mother: Catarina de Castro

Dom Fernando de Almada, 2nd Count of Avranches (in Portugal the title became indigenated as Conde de Avranches) (c. 1430 – c. 29 April 1496) was a Portuguese nobleman.

== Life ==
He was the only son of Dom Álvaro Vaz de Almada, 1st Count of Avranches second marriage to Dona Catarina de Castro.

He succeeded his father at the office of Captain Major of the Galleys by Letter of 28 February 1456. He went along with Dom Afonso V to France in 1476 and, at Tours, Louis XI granted him the title of Comte d' Avranches, since Normandy was then included in the Crown of France. He had the confirmation of the title in 1476 or 1477, being designated as "of our Council and Captain Major in all our Kingdoms". The grace was again confirmed on 7 May 1478 by Dom João, Prince Heir and Regent (later Dom João II), with the settlement of 102,864 reais brancos (white reals).

== Marriage and issue ==
He married in 1463 to Dona Constança de Noronha, "niece of the King" and Damsel of Princess Dona Joana (Saint Joana), daughter of Dom Rui Vaz Pereira and his wife Dona Beatriz de Noronha, bastard daughter of the 1st Count de Noroña and 1st Count of Gijón (a bastard son of King Henry II of Castile), maternal grand-aunt of Pope Paul IV, and had issue:

- Dom Pedro de Almada
- Dom Antão de Almada, 6th Lord of Lagares de El-Rei (b. c. 1465), Alcaide of Lisbon, married to Dona Maria de Meneses (daughter of Dom Rodrigo de Meneses, Commander of Grândola, and wife Leonor Mascarenhas), and had issue, also had a daughter born out of wedlock by an unknown mother
- Dona Isabel de Noronha e Castro (b. c. 1475), married to António de Mendonça Furtado (b. c. 1475) (son of Nuno Furtado de Mendonça, Fidalgo of the Royal Household, and wife Leonor da Silva), had issue

Out of wedlock, he had two more children by an unknown mother:

- Dona Beatriz Fernandes de Abranches (1461–1500), married as his first wife to Diogo Afonso, Fidalgo of the Royal Household, had issue (ancestors of Aristides de Sousa Mendes)
- Dom Rui Fernandes de Almada, married to an unknown woman (probably from the Carneiro family), had issue

== Sources ==
- Various, "Nobreza de Portugal e do Brasil", Lisbon, Portugal, 1960, Volume Segundo, pp. 356–357
