= Vasco Fernandes Coutinho, lord of Couto =

Portuguese nobleman

Vasco Fernandes Coutinho
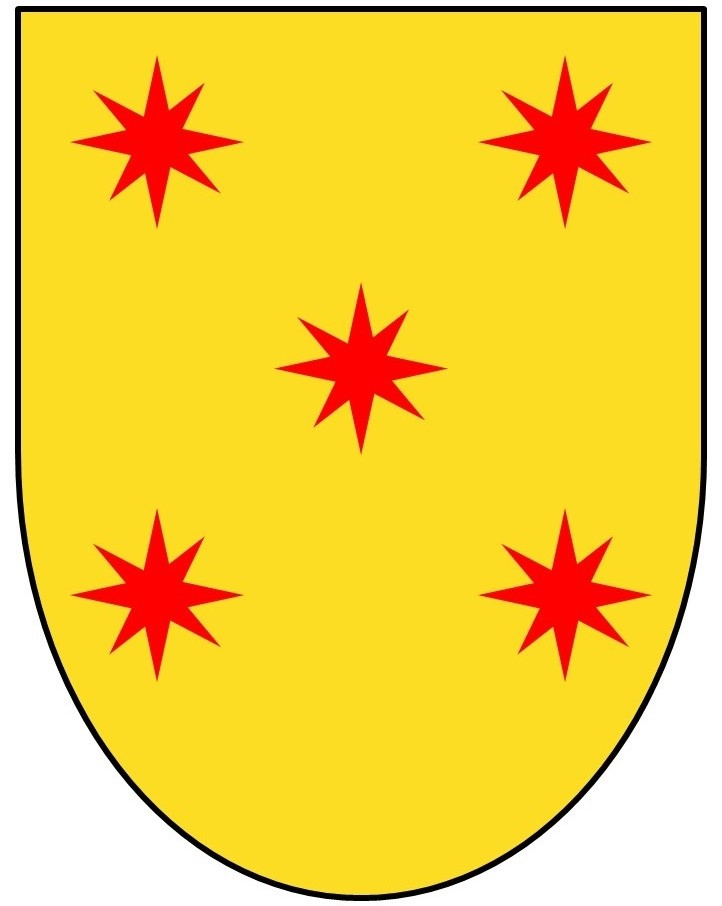
- Shield of Coutinho

Lord of Couto de Leomil
- Monarch: Ferdinand I of Portugal

Personal details
- Born: 14th-century Portugal
- Died: 14th-century Portugal
- Occupation: Politician

Military service
- Allegiance: Kingdom of Portugal

Vasco Fernandes Coutinho (14th-century) was a Portuguese nobleman, who served as vassal of Ferdinand I. He was Lord of Couto de Leomil (pt).

== Biography ==
Vasco Fernandes was the son of Fernaö Mártins da Fonseca Coutinho and Theresa Pires Varella, belonging to noble Lusitanian lineages. His wife was Beatriz Gonçalves de Moura, a noble woman, daughter of Gonçalo Vasques de Moura (Alcalde of Moura), and Inês Gonçalves de Sequeira.
