= Viscounts and counts of Avranches =

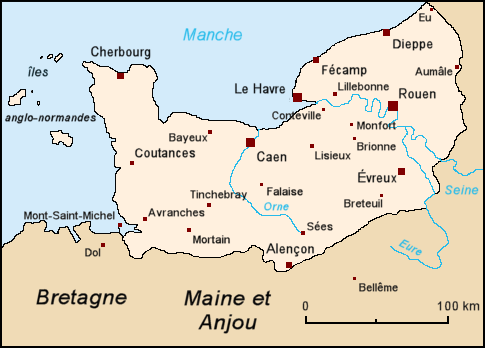
Map of Normandy

The Viscounty and County of Avranches was a medieval viscounty and county in the Duchy of Normandy in France centered on the town of Avranches and located in the area of the Avranchin, disputed between France and England during parts of the Hundred Years' War. A choice landholding, granted to a noble in return for service and favor.

== Viscounts of the House of Avranches ==
- Richard le Goz (sometime bef. 1046–1082 or aft.)
- Hugh d'Avranches (1082 or aft.–1101), also 1st Earl of Chester
- Richard d'Avranches (1101–1120), also 2nd Earl of Chester

== Viscounts of the House of Bessin ==
- Ranulf le Meschin (1120–1129), also 3rd Earl of Chester
- Ranulf de Gernon (1129–1153), also 4th Earl of Chester
- Hugh of Cyfeiliog (1153–1181), also 5th Earl of Chester
- Ranulf de Blondeville (1181–1204), also 6th Earl of Chester; Avranches was lost to France in 1204

== Counts of the House of Almada ==
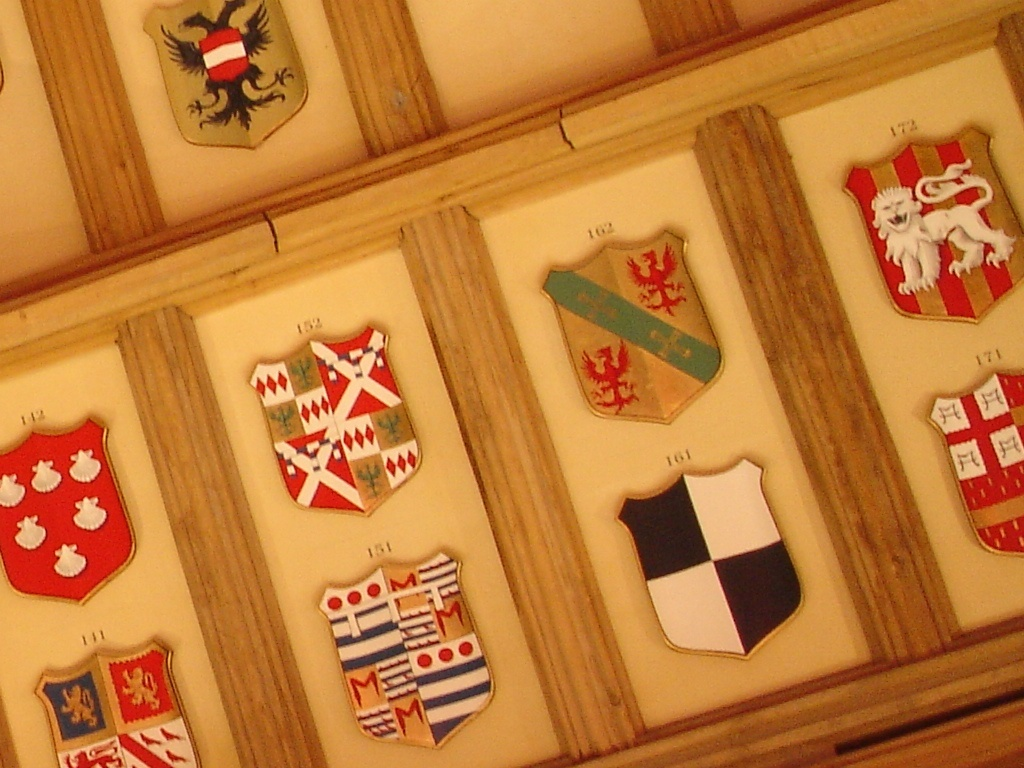
Dom Álvaro Vaz de Almada's coat-of-arms (nr. 162) displayed at St. George's Hall, Windsor Castle. He was made the 162nd Knight of the Garter.

- 1445–1449 Álvaro Vaz de Almada, 1st Count of Avranches, KG (created by Henry VI of England); Avranches was lost to France soon after in 1450
- 1476–1496 Fernando de Almada, 2nd Count of Avranches (created by Louis XI of France), 5th Lord of Lagares d' El-Rei jure uxoris

The following are the holders of the title by right, by virtue of inheritance under the salic law, even if some of them did not make use of it:

  - 1496–15?? Antão de Almada, 3rd Count of Avranches, 6th Lord of Lagares d' El-Rei
  - 15??–15?? Fernando de Almada, 4th Count of Avranches, 7th Lord of Lagares d' El-Rei, 2nd Lord of Pombalinho jure uxoris
  - 15??–15?? Antão Soares de Almada, 5th Count of Avranches, 8th Lord of Lagares d' El-Rei, 3rd Lord of Pombalinho
  - 15??–16?? Lourenço Soares de Almada, 6th Count of Avranches, 9th Lord of Lagares d' El-Rei, 4th Lord of Pombalinho
  - 15??–1644 Antão de Almada, 7th Count of Avranches, 10th Lord of Lagares d' El-Rei, 5th Lord of Pombalinho
  - 1644–1660 Luís de Almada, 8th Count of Avranches, 11th Lord of Lagares d' El-Rei, 6th Lord of Pombalinho
  - 1660–1669 Antão de Almada e Meneses, 9th Count of Avranches, did not succeed his father in Portugal
  - 1669–1729 Lourenço de Almada, 10th Count of Avranches, 12th Lord of Lagares d' El-Rei, 7th Lord of Pombalinho; his son succeeded him in Portugal vita patris
  - 1729–17?? Lourenço de Almada, 11th Count of Avranches, 14th Lord of Lagares d' El-Rei, 9th Lord of Pombalinho
  - 17??–1797 Antão de Almada, 12th Count of Avranches, 15th Lord of Lagares d' El-Rei jure uxoris, 10th Lord of Pombalinho jure uxoris
  - 1797–1815 Lourenço José Boaventura de Almada, 13th Count of Avranches, 1st Count of Almada, 16th Lord of Lagares d' El-Rei, 11th Lord of Pombalinho
  - 1815–1834 Antão José Maria de Almada, 14th Count of Avranches, 2nd Count of Almada, 17th Lord of Lagares d' El-Rei, 12th Lord of Pombalinho
  - 1834–1874 Lourenço José Maria de Almada de Abreu Pereira Cyrne Peixoto, 15th Count of Avranches, 3rd Count of Almada, 18th Lord of Lagares d' El-Rei, 13th Lord of Pombalinho
  - 1874–1909 José Maria de Almada, 16th Count of Avranches, 19th Lord of Lagares d' El-Rei, 14th Lord of Pombalinho
  - 1909–1916 Miguel Vaz de Almada, 17th Count of Avranches, 20th Lord of Lagares d' El-Rei, 15th Lord of Pombalinho
  - 1916–1919 Luís Vaz de Almada, 18th Count of Avranches, 21st Lord of Lagares d' El-Rei, 16th Lord of Pombalinho
  - 1919–1978 Lourenço Vaz de Almada, 19th Count of Avranches, 4th Count of Almada, 22nd Lord of Lagares d' El-Rei, 17th Lord of Pombalinho
  - 1978–1998 Luís Francisco de Almada, 20th Count of Avranches, 5th Count of Almada, 23rd Lord of Lagares d' El-Rei, 18th Lord of Pombalinho
  - 1998–present Lourenço José de Almada, 21st Count of Avranches, 6th Count of Almada, 24th Lord of Lagares d' El-Rei, 19th Lord of Pombalinho
    - Heir presumptive: Luís Manuel de Almada, future 22nd Count of Avranches, future 7th Count of Almada, 25th Lord of Lagares d' El-Rei, 20th Lord of Pombalinho

== Sources ==
- Various, "Nobreza de Portugal e do Brasil", Lisbon, Portugal, 1960, Volume Segundo, pp. 356–357
- Various, "Armorial Lusitano", Lisbon, Portugal, 1961, pp. 26–27 and pp. 42–43
- Visconde de Figanière, "Alguns Documentos Acerca do Conde de Avranches", in Panorama, 3rd Series, Vol. V, Nr. 9
