= Domício Coutinho =

Brazilian-born American poet (1931–2024)

- Born: 1 May 1931; Recife, Brazil
- Died: 6 March 2024 (aged 92); New York City, US
- Children: 2

José Domício Coutinho (1 May 1931 – 6 March 2024) was a Brazilian-born American author, real estate developer, and the founder of the Brazilian Library in New York. He was born in João Pessoa, Brazil in 1931. He migrated to the United States in 1959. He had a bachelor's degree in Aristotelian Thomistic Theology by the Gregorian University of Rome. He had a bachelor's degree in Anglo-Saxon Languages by the Jesuit University of Recife, Brazil. He had a Master and Ph.D. in Comparative Literature from the City University of New York (CUNY).

In 2006, Coutinho founded The Brazilian Library of New York, which houses 7,000 titles, with auditorium for events, conferences, literary gatherings, films and dramatic performances. The library has been visited by prominent representatives from government, diplomacy and academia. As a pioneer of a variety of cultural activities and traditions, the library appears to be the first and only one of its kind to operate inside and outside Brazil.

Coutinho was the author of the novel Duke the Dog Priest. He also authored Salomônica, a collection of Memory and Love Poems.

In 1986, Coutinho with his wife and two sons began a business in real estate appropriation and management of properties.

In 1999, Coutinho founded The Brazilian Writers Association of New York (UBENY). In 2002, he was admitted as Commander into the Order of Rio Branco a Brazilian Institution honoring those who have distinguished themselves in cultural and patriotic achievements.

In 2004, Coutinho founded the Brazilian Endowment for the Arts (BEA), a non-profit organization to preserve and promote the Brazilian Arts, Literature and Cultural Traditions for the Brazilian/American and Latin American Communities as well as for the public of different origins who are interested in the language music arts and cultural traditions of Brazil.

In 2004, Coutinho created The Machado de Assis Medal of Merit to honor those who distinguished themselves in Brazilian Cultural Traditions. Coutinho died on 6 March 2024, at the age of 92.
