= Gonçalo Vasques de Moura =

Portuguese nobleman

- Rico-Homen
- Reign: Afonso IV of Portugal
- Born: 14th-century Kingdom of Portugal
- Died: 14th-century Kingdom of Portugal
- Spouse: Inês de Sequeira

Gonçalo Vasques de Moura (born-14th-century) was a Portuguese nobleman, Alcaide of Moura and Guard of Afonso IV of Portugal.

== Biography ==
Gonçalo was the son of Vasco Martins Serrão de Moura and Teresa Pires de Góis. His mother was daughter of Pedro Salvadores de Góis and Maria Nunes, belonging to illustrious Lusitanian families.

Gonçalo Vasques de Moura was married to Inês de Sequeira, daughter of Álvaro Gonçalves de Sequeira, Alcaide-mor of Lisbon, and Brites Fernandes de Cambra.
