= Luke Coutinho =

Indian entrepreneur and author

- Born: Bombay, Western India
- Occupations: Entrepreneur; author; lifestyle guru
- Spouse: Natashya Phillips
- Children: 1
- Website: www.lukecoutinho.com

Luke Coutinho is an Indian entrepreneur, author and lifestyle guru specialising in nutritional science and alternative medicine. He is the co-founder of Luke Coutinho Holistic Healing Systems Private Ltd and Youcarelifestyle.com.

== Early life ==
Luke Coutinho was born in Bombay, Western India and raised in Goa. He spent his childhood traveling with his family before settling in Goa. During adolescence, he enjoyed outdoor activities and socialising with friends. Initially studying hotel management in college, Coutinho later developed a passion for food and nutritional science, which shaped his career in health and wellness.

== Career ==
Coutinho's career began in the hospitality sector after completing a hotel management course, despite his initial lack of enthusiasm for it. He worked part-time at his cousin’s restaurant in Goa, where he discovered a passion for DJing. Transitioning to the corporate sector, he held positions in Dubai, London, and Qatar, ultimately spending 10 years at IBM. During this period, he pursued nutrition as a hobby and started offering free consultations to improve people's health. After publishing his first book and gaining a substantial client base, Coutinho left his corporate job to focus full-time on health coaching and nutrition.

Subsequently, Coutinho joined GOQii as the head nutritionist, significantly expanding his practice. In 2017, he and his wife, Natashya Phillips, co-founded Luke Coutinho Holistic Healing Systems Private Ltd, specializing in alternative medicine, preventive medicine, disease management and health coaching. In 2020, Coutinho invested in LetsUp, founded by Narendra Firodia, and later co-founded Youcarelifestyle.com with him, establishing an online marketplace for sustainably-driven products from small to medium-sized entrepreneurs. Additionally, he serves as the Chief Programme Mentor and co-founder at Lifeness Science Institute, Mumbai, an educational institution specialising in integrative nutrition and dietetics programs.

== Books ==
Coutinho authored several books including Eat Smart Move More Sleep Right (2011), The Great Indian Diet (2014), (Note: Co-authored with Shilpa Shetty) The Modern Gurukul (2015), (Note: Co-authored with Sonali Bendre) The Dry Fasting Miracle (2018), (Note: Co-authored with Sheikh Abdulaziz Bin Ali Bin Rashed Al Nuaimi) The Magic Weight Loss Pill (2019), (Note: Co-authored with Anushka Shetty) The Magic Immunity Pill (2020), A New Way of Living (2020), Back to the Roots (2021) (Note: Co-authored with Tamannaah Bhatia) and Small Wins Every Day (2023)

== Personal life ==
Coutinho married Natashya Phillips, and they have one daughter.

== Awards and recognitions ==
Coutinho has received the following awards and recognitions:

- Top 50 Most Influential Indians by GQ
- Fit India Champion for Lifestyle and Wellness 2019 by Fit India Movement
- Best Health Expert of the Year Award 2018 by Elle
- Best in the Industry — Nutritionist 2018 by Vogue
- Top 100 Digital Stars 2022, Ranked 87, by Forbes India
