= Diogo de Melo Coutinho (15th century) =

Personal details
- Born: c. 1450 Portugal
- Died: Unknown
- Spouse: Joana de Carvalho

Diogo de Melo Coutinho was a Portuguese navigator, co-discoverer of the Azores Islands.

== Biography ==
Born about 1450 in Portugal, of noble family Diogo de Melo married to Joana de Carvalho, also daughter of nobles.

Diogo de Melo Coutinho was the discoverer of the Azores Islands together with Gonçalo Velho Cabral.
