= Trancoso, Portugal =

Trancoso
- Municipality
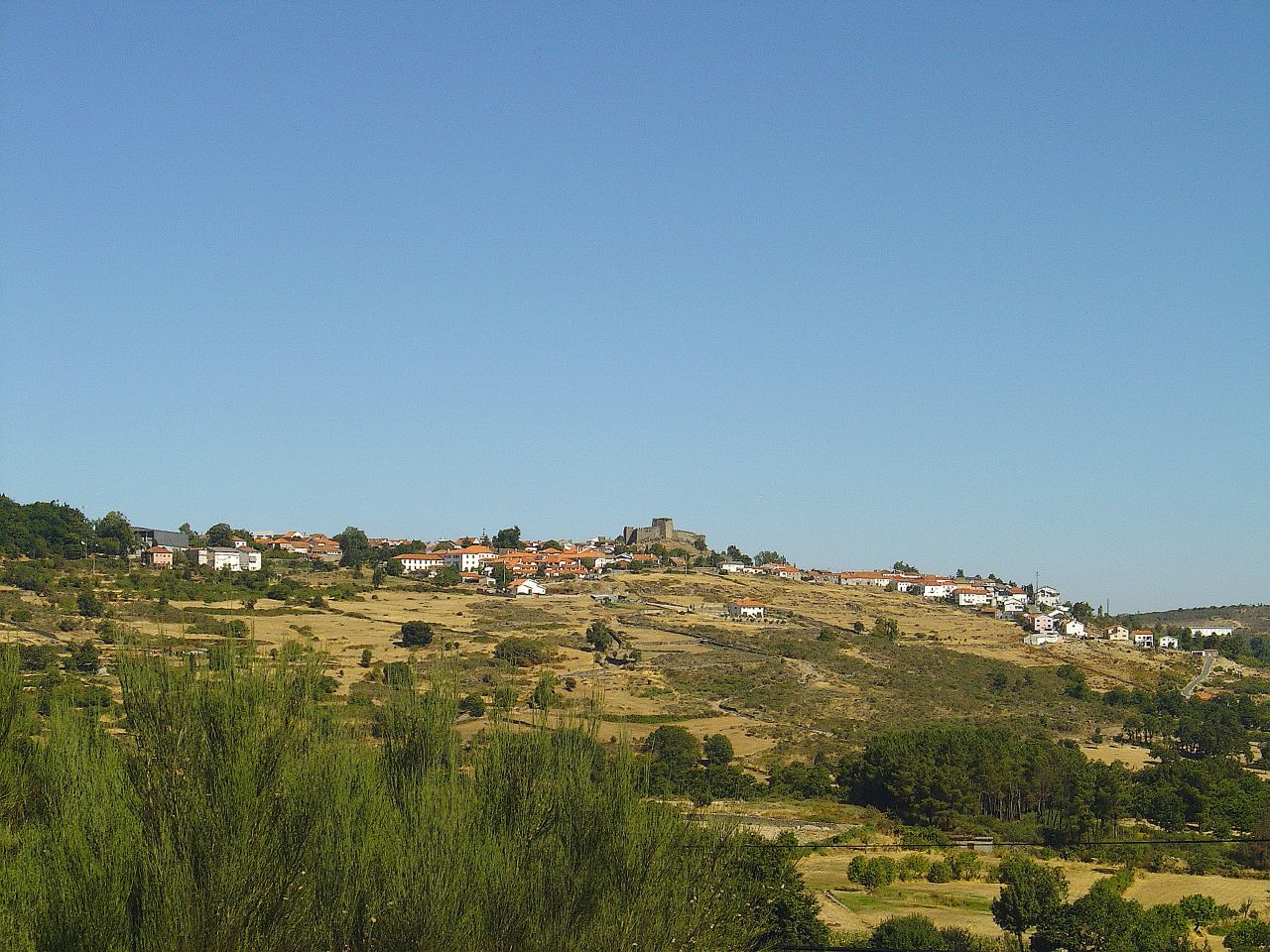
- A panorama of Trancoso, Portugal

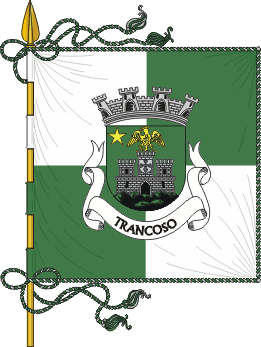
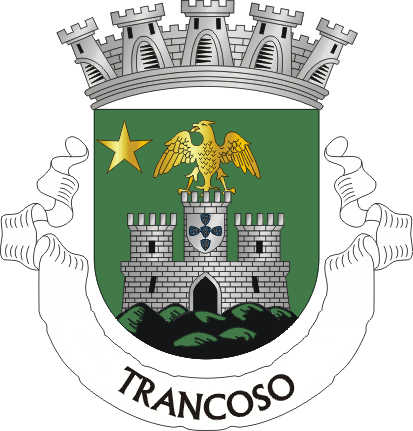
- Flag Coat of arms
- Interactive map of Trancoso
- Coordinates: 40°47′N 7°21′W
- Country: Portugal
- Region: Centro
- Intermunic. comm.: Beiras e Serra da Estrela
- District: Guarda
- Seat: Trancoso Municipal Chamber
- Parishes: 21

Government
  - President: Amilcar Salvador (PS)

Area
  - Total: 361.52 km^{2} (139.58 sq mi)

Population (2011)
  - Total: 9,878
  - Density: 27.32/km^{2} (70.77/sq mi)
- Time zone: UTC+00:00 (WET)
  - Summer (DST): UTC+01:00 (WEST)
- Local holiday: May 29
- Website: http://www.cm-trancoso.pt

Trancoso (Portuguese pronunciation: [tɾɐ̃ˈkozu]) is a city and a municipality in Portugal. The municipality population in 2011 was 9,878, in an area of 361.52 square kilometres (139.58 mi^{2}). The city (cidade) population is about 3.000.

The municipality is located in the District of Guarda, Region Centro, sub-region Beira Interior Norte.

The present Mayor is Amilcar Salvador. The municipal holiday is May 29. Principal monument: Castle of Trancoso. The municipality is served by the Vila Franca das Naves train station on the Beira Alta line from Pampilhosa to the Spanish border.

Trancoso is well known as the place where the 16th-century poet and shoemaker António Gonçalves de Bandarra lived and made his prophetic texts. A statue of him was erected in front of the city hall.

Trancoso is also the birthplace of Isaac Cardoso, born in 1603 or 1604. He was a renowned Jewish author, philosopher, and physicist. Cardoso died in Verona in 1683. His parents were members of the extensive Marrano community in Trancoso that left behind 300 Hebrew inscriptions. 700 Trancoso Jews were persecuted during the Inquisition.

== Parishes ==
Administratively, the municipality is divided into 21 civil parishes (freguesias):

- Aldeia Nova
- Castanheira
- Cogula
- Cótimos
- Fiães
- Freches e Torres
- Granja
- Guilheiro
- Moimentinha
- Moreira de Rei
- Palhais
- Póvoa do Concelho
- Reboleiro
- Rio de Mel
- Trancoso (São Pedro e Santa Maria) e Souto Maior
- Tamanhos
- Torre do Terrenho, Sebadelhe da Serra e Terrenho
- Valdujo
- Vale do Seixo e Vila Garcia
- Vila Franca das Naves e Feital
- Vilares e Carnicães

== Notable people ==
- António Gonçalves de Bandarra (1500 in Trancoso - 1556) a Portuguese writer and shoemaker
- Isaac Cardoso (1603/4 at Trancoso - 1683) a Jewish physician, philosopher and polemic writer.
- Eduarda Lapa (1895 in Trancoso — 1976) a painter and painting teacher, specialized in naturalist still lifes

== Gallery ==
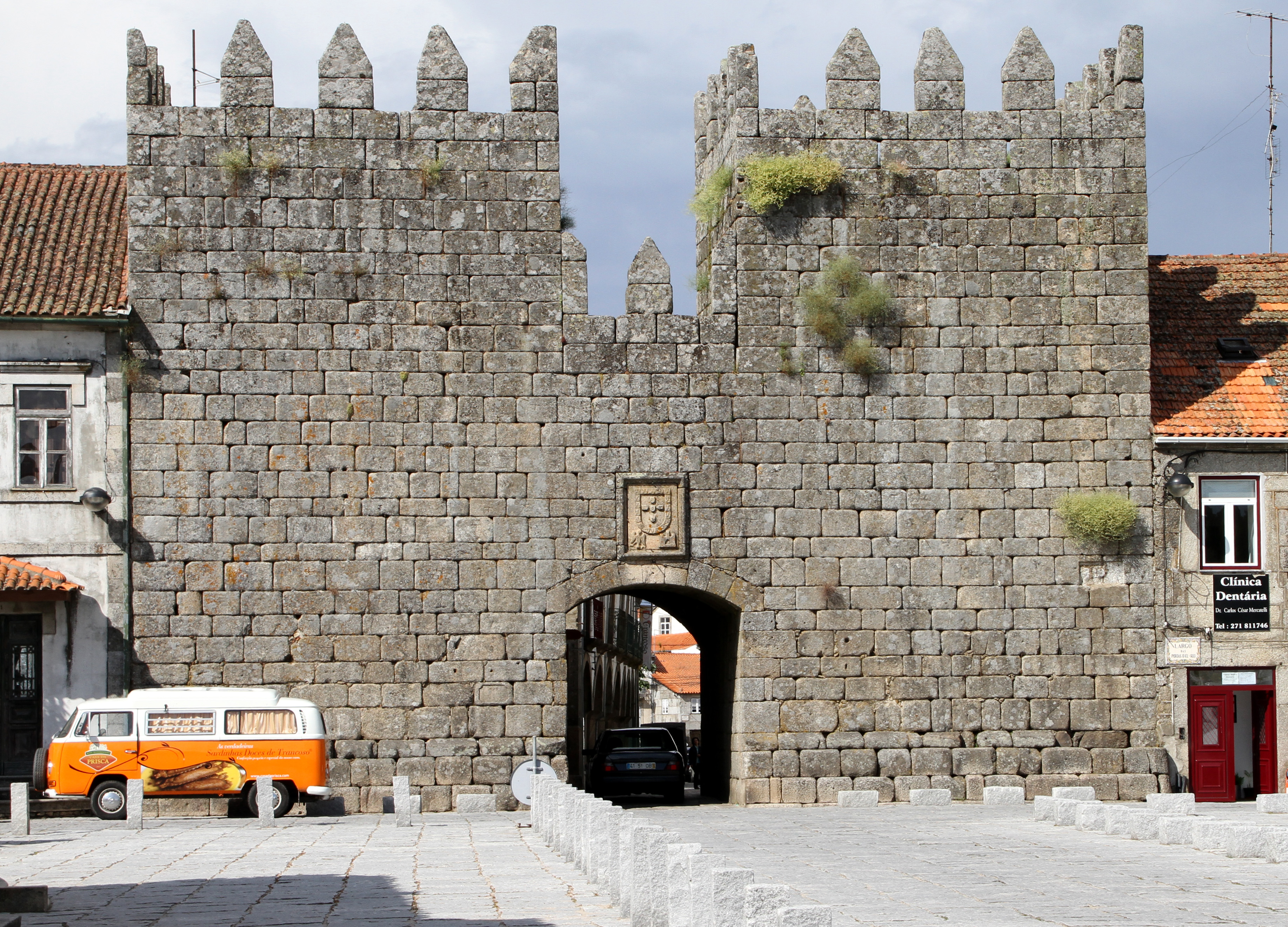

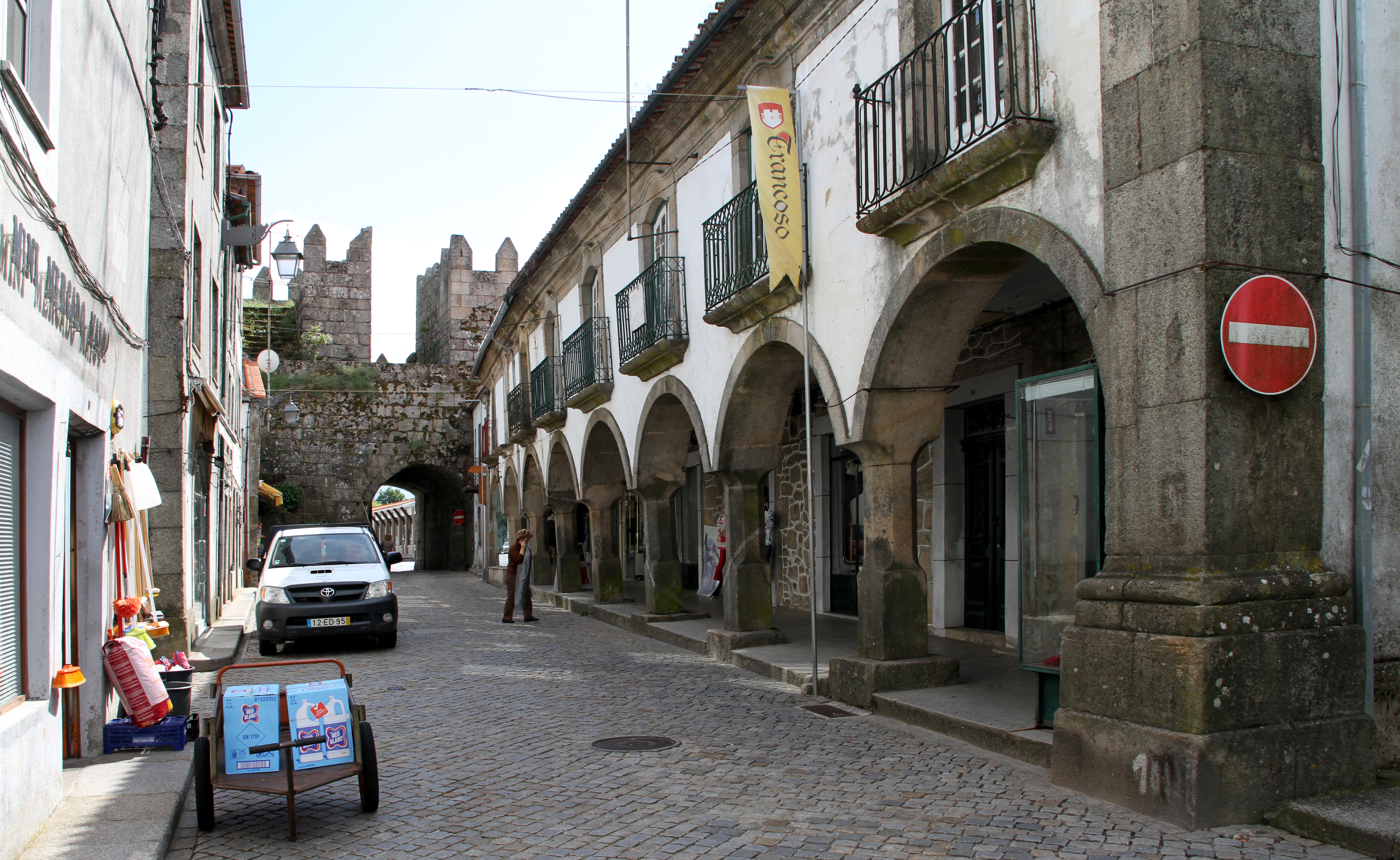

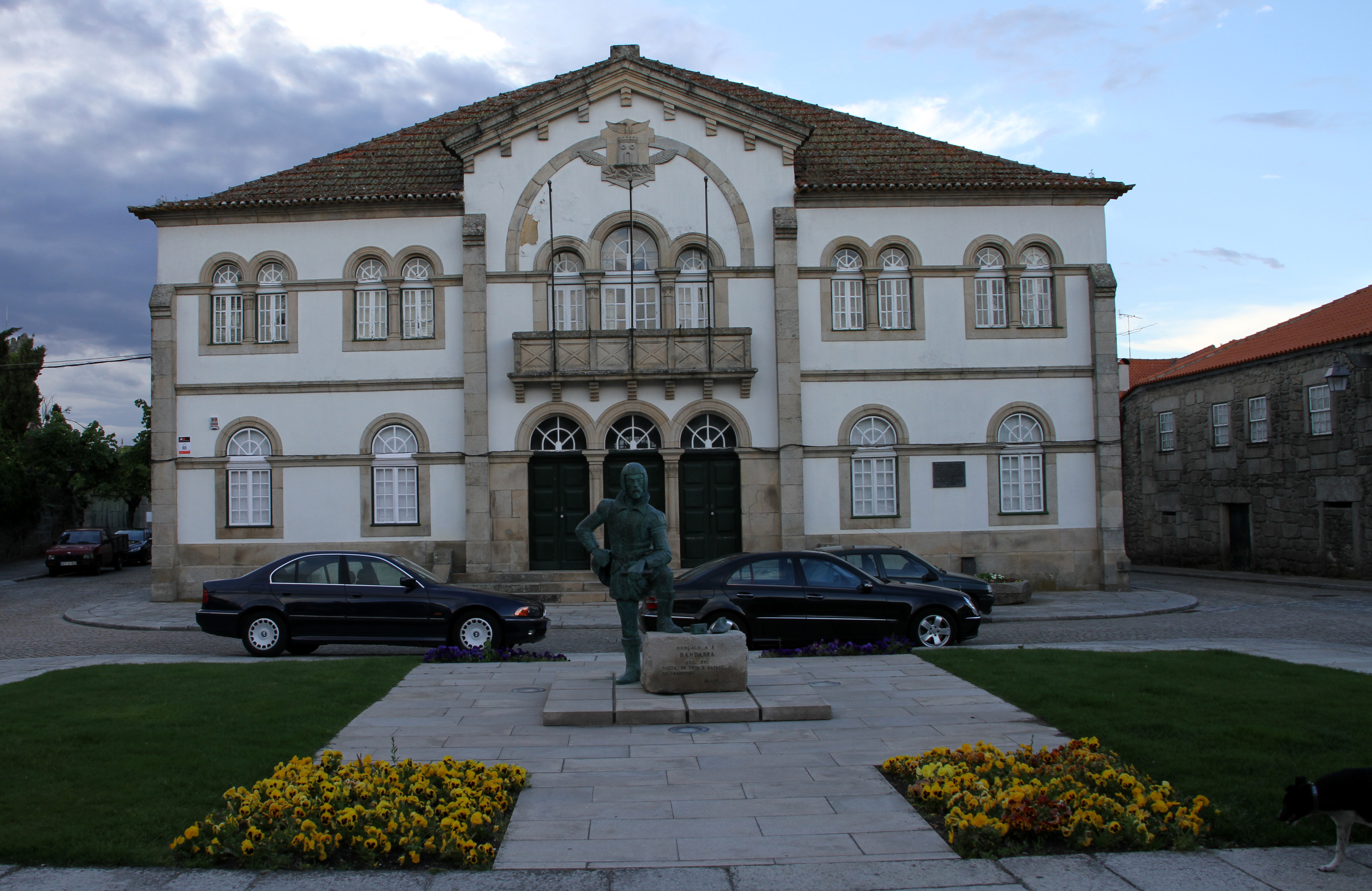

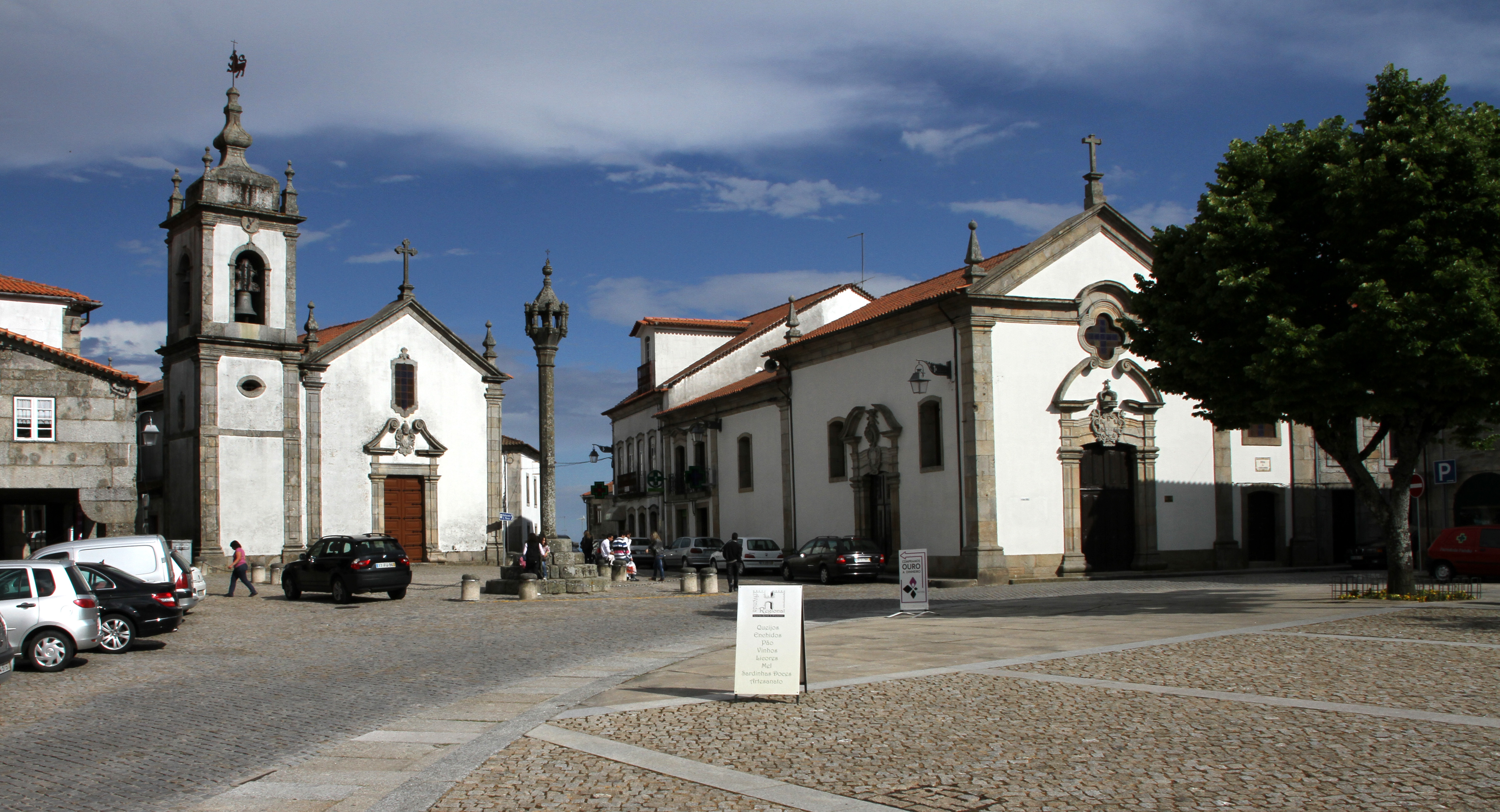

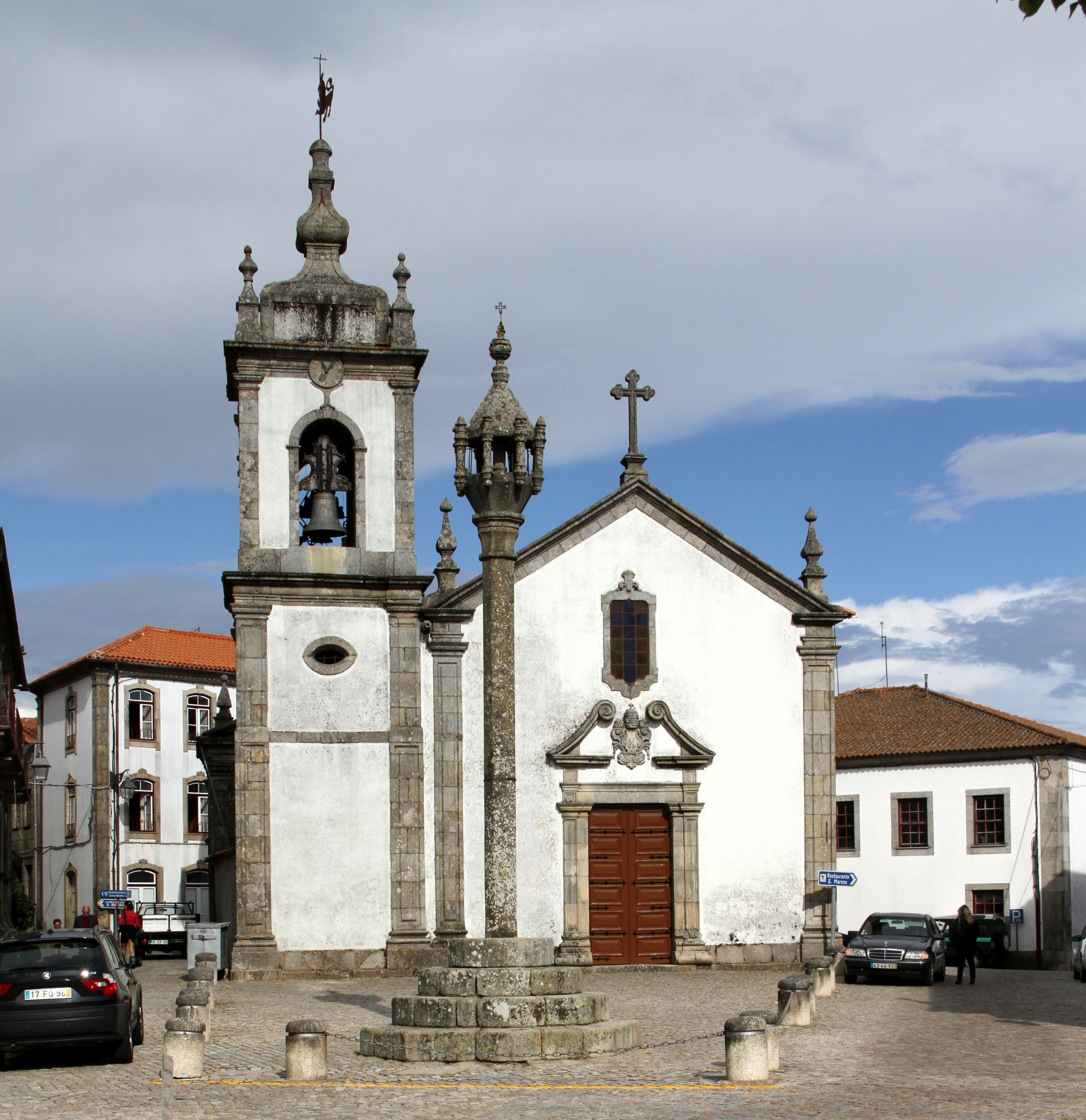

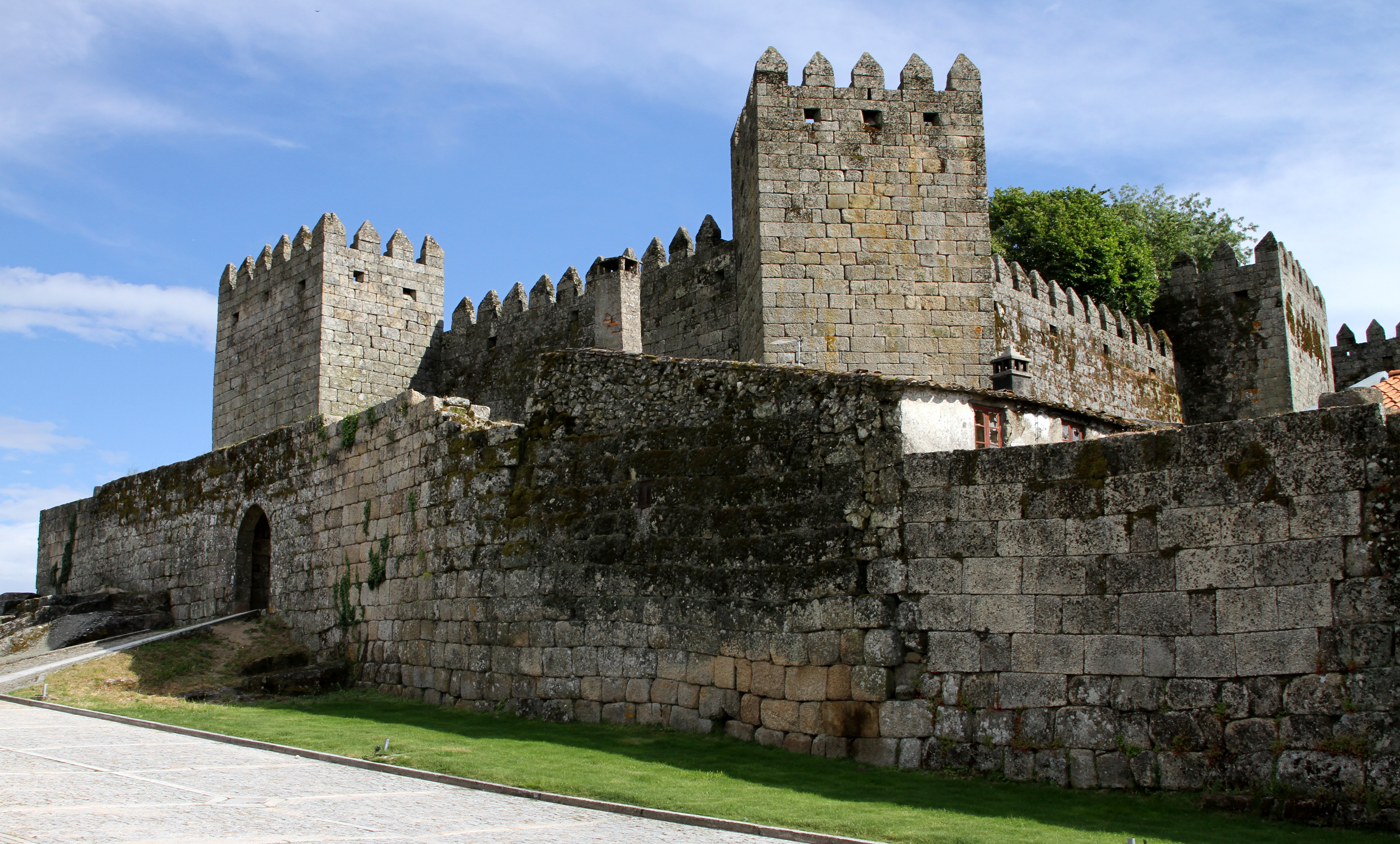

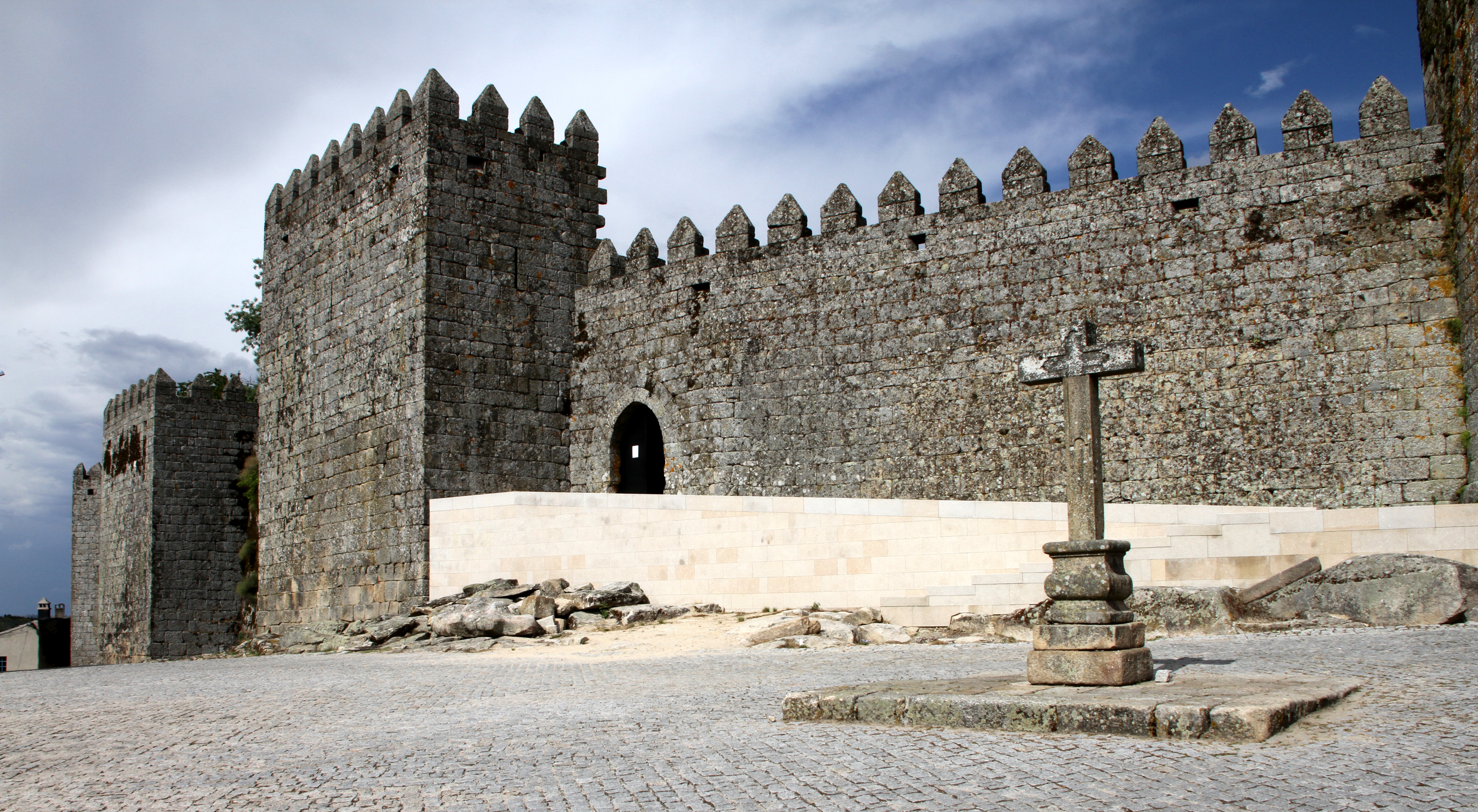

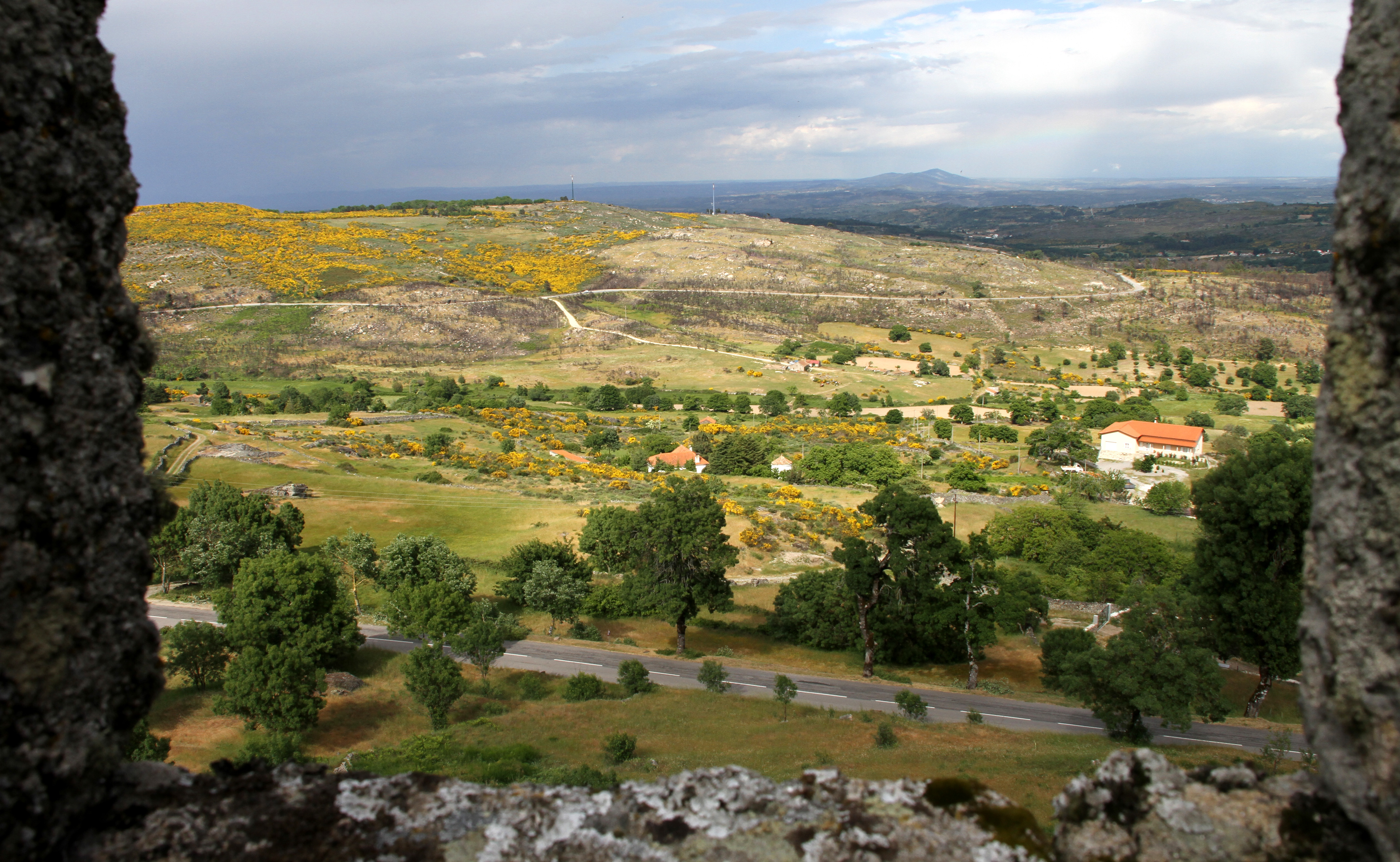
