= Fernão Martins da Fonseca Coutinho =

Portugal nobleman of the 14th century

Fernaö Mártins da Fonseca Coutinho
- Lord
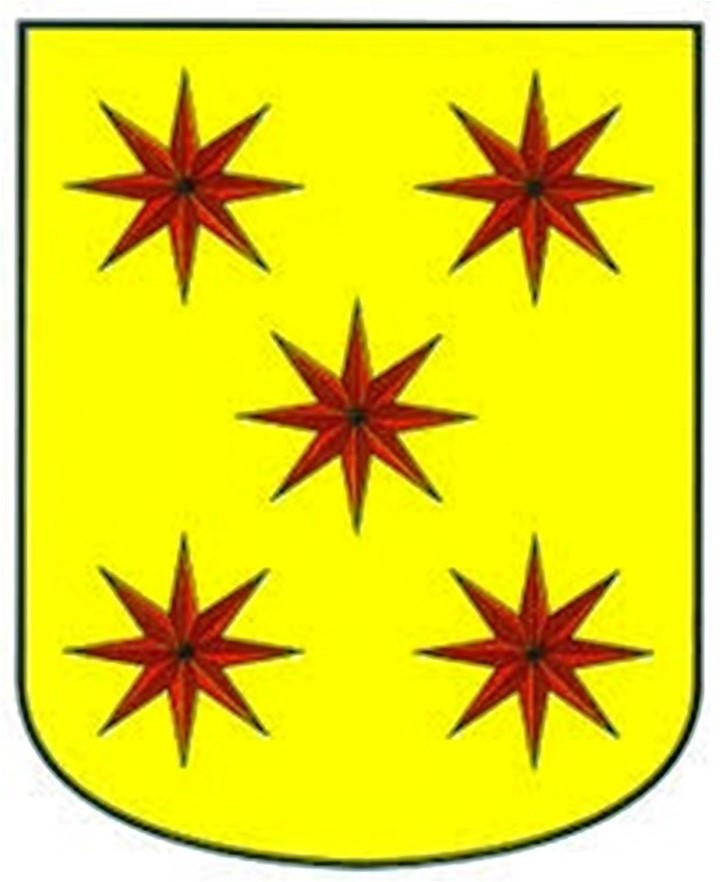
- Born: 14th-century Kingdom of Portugal
- Died: 14th-century Kingdom of Portugal

Fernão Martins da Fonseca Coutinho (born 14th-century) was a Portuguese nobleman, Lord of Couto de Leomil. His parents were Esteban Martins de Leomil and Urraca Rodrigues da Fonseca.

== Biography ==
His parents were Estevão Martins de Leomil and Urraca Rodrigues da Fonseca. Fernaö was married to Teresa Pires Varela.
