= Gonçalo Coutinho, 2nd Count of Marialva =

15th-century Portuguese nobleman

Gonçalo Coutinho
- Count
- Born: 15th-century Portugal
- Died: 15th-century Kingdom of Portugal

Gonçalo Coutinho (born 15th century) was a Portuguese nobleman, Count of Marialva. and Constable of Portugal.

== Biography ==
His parents were Vasco Fernandes Coutinho and Maria de Sousa. Gonçalo was married to Beatriz de Melo, daughter of Martim Afonso de Melo and Briolanja de Sousa.

Gonçalo Coutinho was grandson of Gonçalo Vasques Coutinho and his first wife Leonor Gonçalves de Azevedo.
