= Vasco Fernandes Coutinho, 1st Count of Marialva =

Portuguese nobleman (c. 1385 – 1450)

Coat of Arms of the Counts of Marialva

Vasco Fernandes Coutinho (c. 1385 – 1450) was a distinguished Portuguese nobleman, the 3rd Marshal of Portugal and 1st Count of Marialva (from 1440/41).

== Personal life ==
Fernandes Coutinho was the son of Gonçalo Vasques Coutinho, Lord of Couto de Leomil, the 2nd Marshal of the Kingdom. His brother was Álvaro Gonçalves Coutinho, nicknamed Magriço, a semi-legendary knight of the Twelve of England.

Fernandes Coutinho inherited his father's titles and position as Marshal in 1413. He participated in the Portuguese capture of Ceuta in 1415.

He was one of the leaders of the Portuguese expedition to capture Tangier in 1437, serving directly under Prince Henry the Navigator. Although it proved a disaster, Coutinho served with distinction and was said to be the last man to leave the beach, personally covering the retreat and embarkation of the last Portuguese troops.

After the death of King Edward of Portugal in 1438, Fernandes Coutinho was one of the ringleaders of the noble party, and conspired with Afonso of Barcelos to keep the dowager-queen Eleanor of Aragon as regent for the young King Afonso V of Portugal. They sidelined the popular candidate, prince Peter of Coimbra. Peter's brother, Henry the Navigator, eventually managed to detach Coutinho from Barcelos's side.

In 1441 (or 1440), hoping to win the noblemen's allegiance, regent Peter of Coimbra invested Fernandes Coutinho as the first Count of Marialva. However, relations between the two remained tense. At the Battle of Alfarrobeira in May 1449, Fernandes Coutinho took the field on behalf of Afonso V against Peter of Coimbra. He died a year later.

== Marriage and Children ==
In 1412, Fernandes Coutinho married D. Maria de Sousa (d. 1472), the natural daughter of Lopo Dias de Sousa, master of the Order of Christ. Their eldest son D. Gonçalo Coutinho succeeded as the 2nd Count of Marialva, the younger son D. Álvaro Coutinho, Bishop of Coimbra.

== See also ==
- Counts of Marialva
- Marshal of Portugal

== Sources ==
- Moreno, H. B. (1980). A Batalha de Alfarrobeira. Antecedentes e Significado Histórico (in Portuguese). Vol. II. UC Biblioteca Geral 1. pp. 792–. GGKEY:8ZKYE1N2055.
- Quintella, Ignacio Costa Da (1839). Annaes Da Marinha Portugueza. BiblioBazaar. ISBN 978-1-144-53304-3.
