= Castle of Trancoso =

Castle in Portugal

Coordinates: 40°46′45″N 7°20′51″W

Castelo de Trancoso is a castle in Portugal. It is classified as a National Monument. The castle is in the municipality of Trancoso which is in the Guarda District of Portugal.

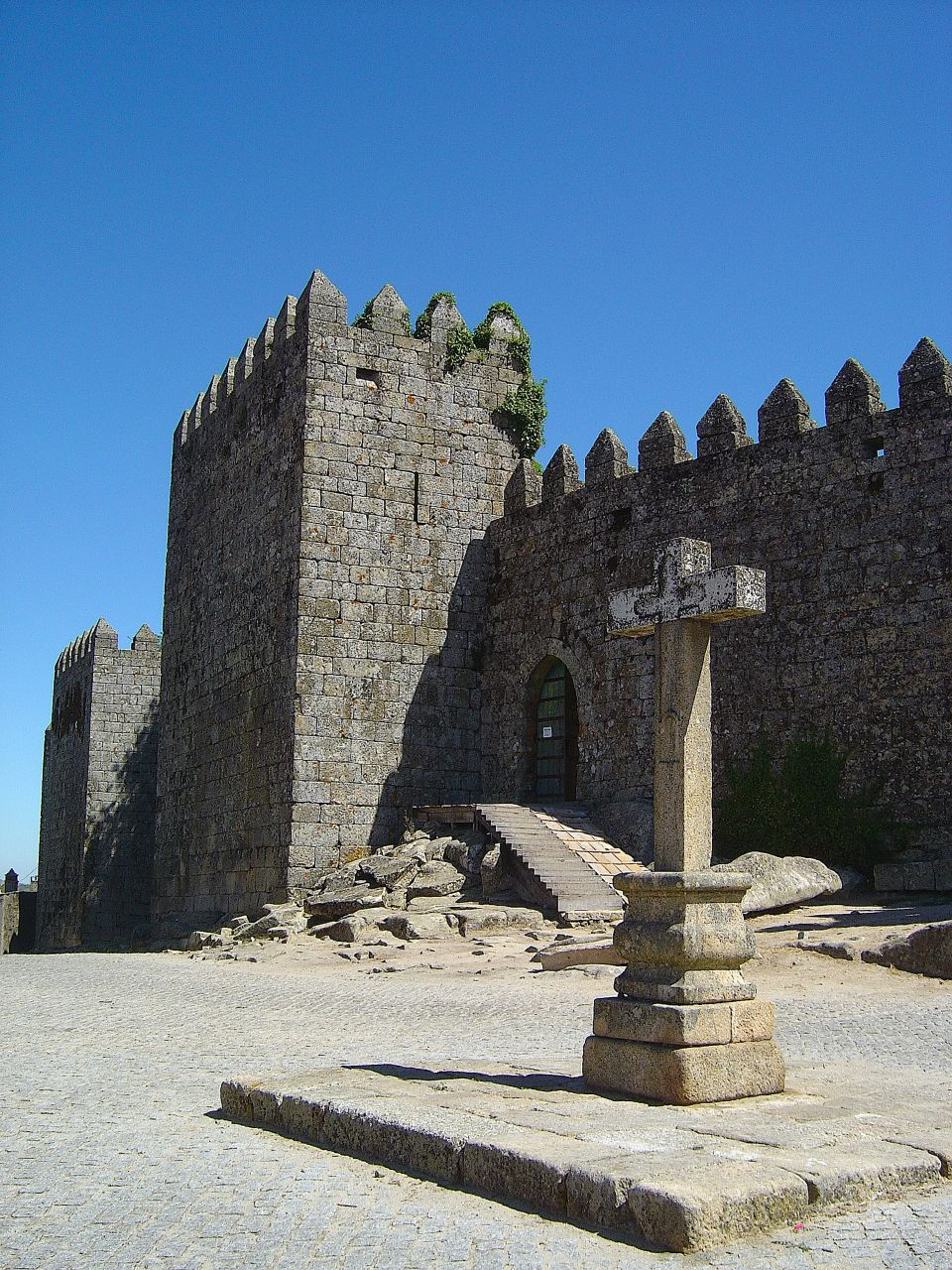
Castelo de Trancoso
