= Marshal of Portugal =

The office of Marshal of the Kingdom of Portugal (Marechal do Reino de Portugal, sometimes Mariscal) was created by King Ferdinand I of Portugal in 1382, in the course of the reorganization of the higher offices of the army of the Kingdom of Portugal. The Marshal was directly subordinate to the Constable of Portugal (Condestável), being principally responsible for the high administrative matters, including the quartering of troops, supplies and other logistical matters.

Gonçalo Vasques de Azevedo was appointed the first Marshal of the Kingdom in 1382. The office then passed to his son-in-law, Gonçalo Vasques Coutinho, and was maintained within the Coutinho family (see Counts of Marialva) until the Iberian Union of 1580. After the 1640 restoration of Portugal, the office was resurrected by King João IV of Portugal and the Algarves, and maintained for a few more years.

The following is the list of title-holders. The date refers to the approximate year of appointment.

== List of the Marshals of the Kingdom of Portugal ==
1. Gonçalo Vasques de Azevedo – 1383
2. Gonçalo Vasques Coutinho, lord of Couto de Leomil – 1385
3. Vasco Fernandes Coutinho, 1st Count of Marialva – c.1413.
4. D. Fernando (I) Coutinho – c. 1450
5. D. Álvaro Gonçalves Coutinho – c. 1480
6. D. Fernando (II) Coutinho – c. 1500
7. D. Álvaro Coutinho – c. 1530
8. D. Fernando (III) Coutinho – c. 1560
9. D. Fernando (IV) Coutinho – c. 1578
10. D. Fernando Mascarenhas, Conde de Serém – 1643
11. D. Jorge Mascarenhas, Conde de Serém – 1650

== See also ==
- Marshal
- Constable of Portugal
- List of Marshals of Portugal
