= Almada (disambiguation) =

Almada is a city and a municipality in Portugal.

Almada may also refer to:

== Noble title ==
- Count of Almada

== People ==
- Álvaro Vaz de Almada, 1st Count of Avranches (1390–1449), Portuguese nobleman and a knight of the Garter
- Enrique Almada (1934–1990), Uruguayan comedian
- Fernando de Almada, 2nd Count of Avranches (1430–1496), Portuguese nobleman
- José de Almada Negreiros (1893–1970), Portuguese artist
- Juan Carlos Almada (born 1962), former Argentine footballer
- Lou Almada (1907–2005), Mexican-American baseball player
- Lourenço José Boaventura de Almada, 1st Count of Almada, Captain-General of the Azores
- Luís Carlos Almada Soares (born 1986), Cape Verdean footballer
- Mario Almada (actor) (1922–2016), Mexican actor
- Mario Almada (field hockey) (born 1975), Argentine field hockey forward
- Martín Almada (1937–2024), Paraguayan lawyer, writer and educationalist
- Mel Almada (1913–1988), Mexican-American baseball player in Major League Baseball
- Nadia Almada (born 1977), British reality television star
- Sebastián Almada (born 1973), Uruguayan comedian and actor
- Selva Almada (born 1973), Argentine writer
- Thiago Almada (born 2001), Argentine footballer
