= Évora Municipal Chamber =

Legislative body of Évora

Coordinates: 38.57241°N 7.90963°W

Évora Municipal Chamber Câmara Municipal de Évora
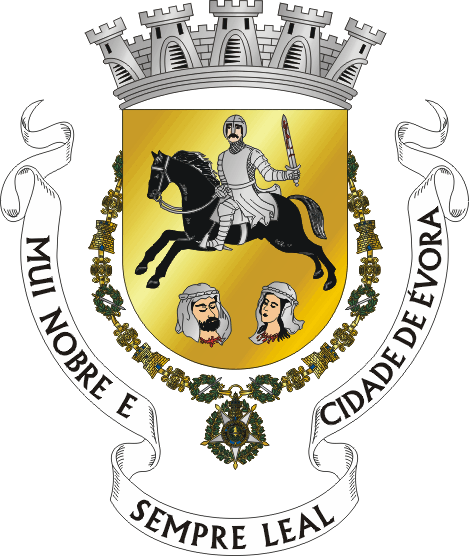
- Coat of arms of the city of Évora

Type
- Type: Câmara municipal
- Term limits: 3

History
- Founded: 1166; 860 years ago

Leadership
- President: Carlos Zorrinho, PS since 3 November 2025
- Vice President: Jerónimo José, PS since 3 November 2025

Structure
- Seats: 7
- Political groups: Municipal Executive (3) PS (3) Opposition (4) PSD (2) PCP(1) CH (1)
- Length of term: Four years

Elections
- Last election: 12 October 2025
- Next election: Sometime between 22 September and 14 October 2029

Meeting place
- Paços do Concelho de Évora

Website
- www.cm-evora.pt

The Évora Municipal Chamber (Portuguese: Câmara Municipal de Évora) is the administrative authority in the municipality of Évora. It has 12 freguesias in its area of jurisdiction and is based in the city of Évora, on the Évora District. These freguesias are: Bacelo e Senhora da Saúde; Canaviais; Évora (São Mamede, Sé, São Pedro e Santo Antão); Malagueira e Horta das Figueiras; Nossa Senhora da Graça do Divor; Nossa Senhora da Tourega e Nossa Senhora de Guadalupe; Nossa Senhora de Machede; São Bento do Mato; São Manços e São Vicente do Pigeiro; São Miguel de Machede; São Sebastião da Giesteira e Nossa Senhora da Boa Fé and Torre de Coelheiros.

The Évora City Council is made up of 7 councillors, representing, currently, four different political forces. The first candidate on the list with the most votes in a municipal election or, in the event of a vacancy, the next candidate on the list, takes office as President of the Municipal Chamber.

== List of the Presidents of the Municipal Chamber of Évora ==
- Júlio do Patrocínio Martins – (1910)
- Agostinho Felício Caeiro – (1910–1911)
- Máximo Homem de Campos Rodrigues – (1911–1913)
- António dos Santos Cartaxo Júnior – (1913–1914)
- Florival Sanches de Miranda – (1914–1915)
- António José Molero – (1915)
- Manuel Gomes Fradinho – (1915–1916)
- Florival Sanches de Miranda – (1916–1919)
- Jorge Barros Capinha – (1919–1921)
- Raúl Albano da Veiga Pereira Matroco – (1921–1922)
- Domingos Victor Cordeiro Rosado – (1922–1923)
- Alberto Jordão Marques da Costa – (1923–1926)
- Domingos Victor Cordeiro Rosado – (1926–1928)
- António Joaquim Lopes da Silva – (1928–1930)
- Luís de Camões – (1930–1934)
- Luís Alves Martins – (1934–1936)
- Virgílio Salvador Ricardo da Costa – (1936–1938)
- Miguel Fernandes Soares – (1938–1941)
- Júlio Rodolfo Fernandes Potes – (1941–1942)
- Miguel Rodrigues Bastos – (1942–1946)
- João Luís Graça Zagallo Vieira da Silva – (1946)
- Henrique da Fonseca Chaves – (1946–1952)
- João Luís Graça Zagallo Vieira da Silva – (1952–1964)
- Serafim de Jesus Silveira Júnior – (1964–1969)
- António de Freitas Mascarenhas Lima Duarte Gerald – (1969–1972)
- Carlos Garcia Fialho – (1972–1974)
- Manuel Tierno Bagulho – (1974–1975)
- Humberto Carlos Pereira Paixão – (1975–1977)
- Abílio Dias Fernandes – (1977–2002)
- José Ernesto Oliveira – (2002–2013)
- Manuel António Melgão – (2013)
- Carlos Pinto de Sá – (2013–2025)
- Carlos Zorrinho – (2025–...)

(The list is incomplete)
