= Lourenço José Boaventura de Almada, 13th Count of Avranches =

Historical person

Lourenço Boaventura de Almada
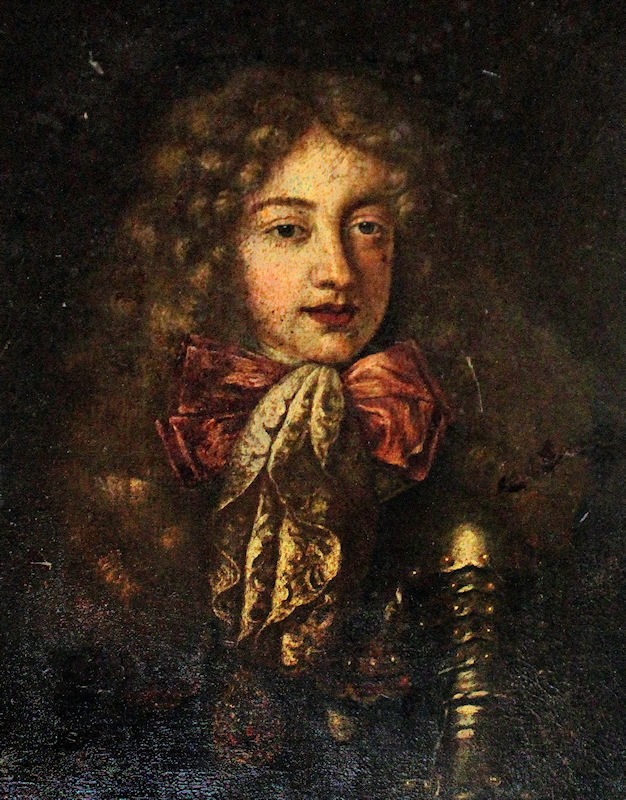

4th Captain-General of the Azores
- In office 1799–1804
- Monarch: Regency of Infante John IV
- Prime Minister: José Pegado do Azevedo
- Preceded by: José da Avé-Maria Leite da Costa e Silva
- Succeeded by: José António de Melo da Silva César e Meneses
- Constituency: Azores

Personal details
- Born: Lourenço José Boaventura de Almada; 1758
- Died: 1815 (aged 56–57) Lisbon
- Resting place: Convent of Graça
- Citizenship: Kingdom of Portugal
- Spouse: Maria Bárbara José António da Mercês Lobo da Silveira Quaresma
- Children: D. Antão José Maria de Almada; Leonor Josefa de Almada

Lourenço José Boaventura de Almada (1758–1815), 13th Count of Avranches and 1st Count of Almada (created by Queen Maria I of Portugal), by regal charter on 29 April 1793 (and confirmed by letter on 4 May 1793) to him and his descendants.

== Biography ==
He was born in Lisbon, on 14 July 1758 (the feast day of São Boaventura), in the Senhorio dos Lagares d’El-Rei, which at the time belong to the parish of Anjos, and baptized on 10 August (feast day of São Lourenço). He was the son of Antão de Almada (14th master of Lagares d´El-Rei) and his cousin D. Violante Josefa de Almada Henriques (11th Countess of Avranches and 10 master of Pombalinho), daughter of D. Lourenço de Almada (9th master of Pombalinho).

Lourenço was educated in Terceira, during his father's governorship of the Captaincy of the Azores.

He was the Grand Master of Ceremonies to the Royal House, deputy of the Estates-General (Portuguese: Junta dos Três Estados), and president of the Royal Treasury's Board of Administration and Collections (Portuguese: Junta da Administração e Arrecadação da Real Fazenda). He was master of the Majorat of Lagares d´El-Rei, 11th master of Pombalinho and was in the Order of Christ, Alcalde and Commander of Proença-a-Velha, Commander of São Miguel de Acha and of São Vicente de Vimioso.

=== Captaincy-General ===
He obtained the post of Lieutenant-Colonel of the Cavalary and, just like his father, became the Captain-General of the Azores, becoming the third in the position. Nominated on 15 July 1795, he disembarked to much pomp in Angra on 6 November 1799, the day that he took power, even as the Regent increased his powers in the colony.

Afonso de Ornelas, in his research on the family, who: "around the Azores, in function of the role of deputy of the Estates-General, when the first French peninsular invasion,...he was a patriotic wind, that the Almadas was an authentic symbol when the independence of the country was in danger...going as far as revolting against local interest who wanted to thank Napoleon for his reception of Portuguese deputies who had gone to compliment Bayonne, who had requested that one of the princes return to Portugal to act as regent."

One of Lourenço's first initiatives was to pardon Azorean deserters who did not wish to fight in the Napoleonic Wars on the peninsula. His reasonable style would come back to haunt him later, as recruitment in the Azores would be difficult: farmers would be wary of sending troops, and the Captain-General would attempt recruitment in moderation. During his tenure he accomplished many measures in the public good, that included the creation of mathematics classes in the Castle of São João Baptista, that would become the embryo for the Military Academy. He was also instrumental in promoting the cultivation of Irish potatoes and flax/hemp on the islands. There are also indications that he was a cavaleiro during Portuguese-style bullfighting between 11 August and 25 October 1787, during a festival in Angra.

When he arrived in the Azores, he was accompanied by his wife, who died on 22–23 November 1801, following the birth of his eldest son (who would become the 2nd Count of Almada). She was buried in the Chapel of Nossa Senhora das Dores, in the interior of the Church of São Francisco in Angra. Her death had a destabilizing effect on the Count, whose moderating style was abandoned and he began abusing his powers, resulting in his substitution in 1804. In October 1804, or 1805, with the arrival of his successor, he departed for Lisbon, possibly on the illustrious brigantine, called Conde de Almada, that years earlier had brought a vaccine to protect against the smallpox.

== Later life ==
He died in Lisbon in his residence (the then-Palácio do Rossio, today the Palácio da Independência on 11 May 1815. He was buried on the following day below the altar of Nossa Senhora das Dores, in the Convent of Graça, in the family crypt (occupied by his descendants since Lopo Soares de Alvarenga.

He married in the parish of Ajuda on 2 May 1786, with D. Maria Bárbara José António da Mercês Lobo da Silveira Quaresma, daughter of D. Fernando José Lobo da Silveira Quaresma, 4th Marquess of Alvito and 4th Count of Oriola (and his second wife, D. Maria Bárbara de Menezes, daughter of D. José de Menezes da Silveira de Castro e Távora, Commander of Valada and master of the seigneurial estate of Patameira).

== Descendants ==
- D. Antão José Maria de Almada (1801 — 1834), master of Lagares de El-Rei, Alcalde and Commander of Proença-a-Velha, who married D. Maria Francisca de Abreu Pereira Cirne Peixoto, mistress of Paço de Lanheses on 30 March 1818.
- Leonor Josefa de Almada, who married her cousin, Lourenço Gonçalves da Câmara Coutinho, eldest sone of João Gonçalves da Câmara Coutinho, Almotacé-mór do Reino.
