= Condeixa-a-Nova =

Municipality in Centro, Portugal

- Municipality
- Town of Condeixa-a-Nova
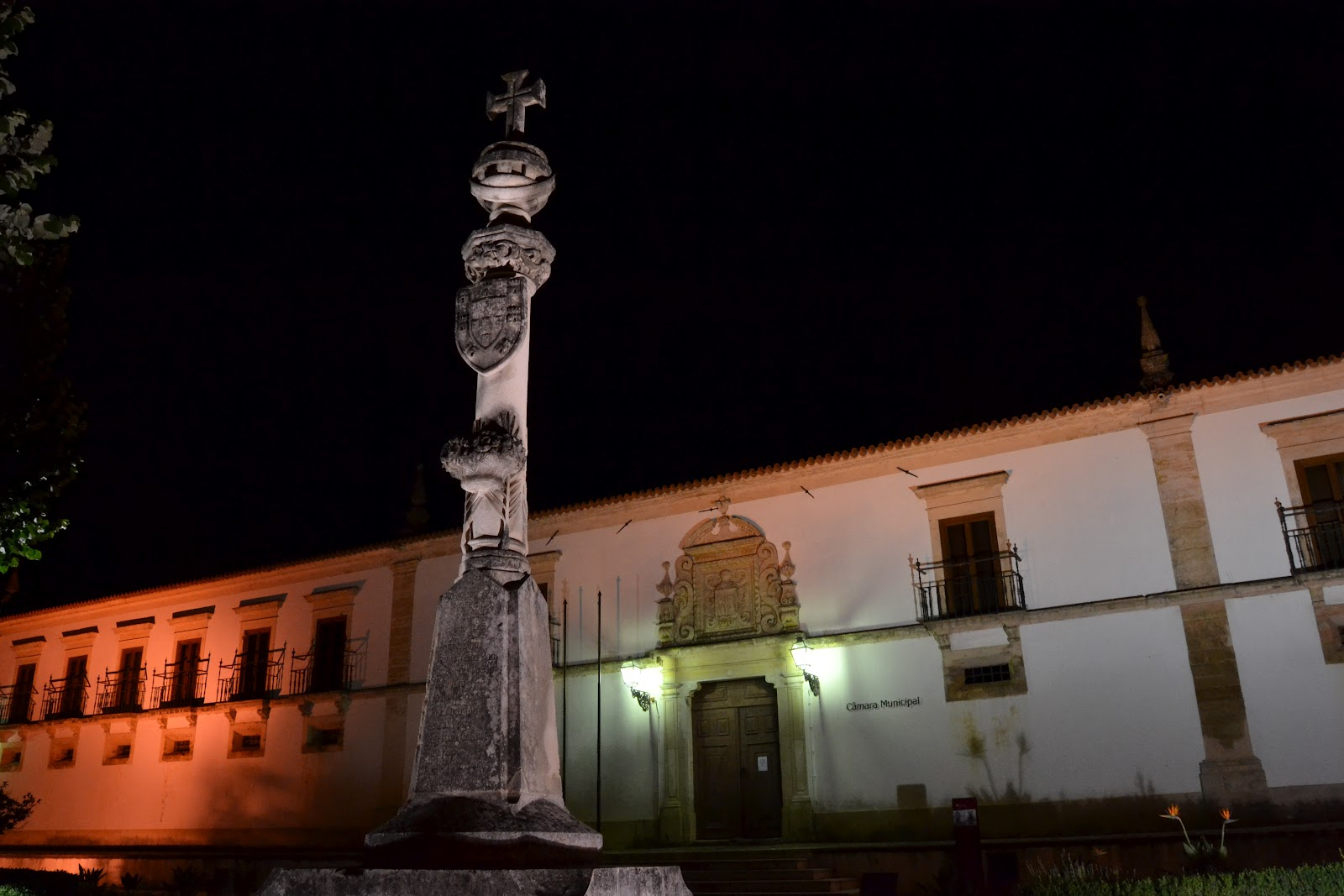
- View of Condeixa-a-Nova

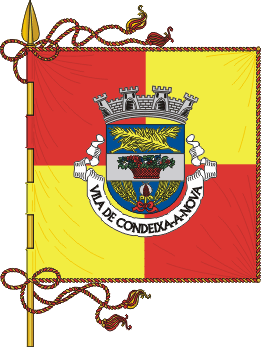
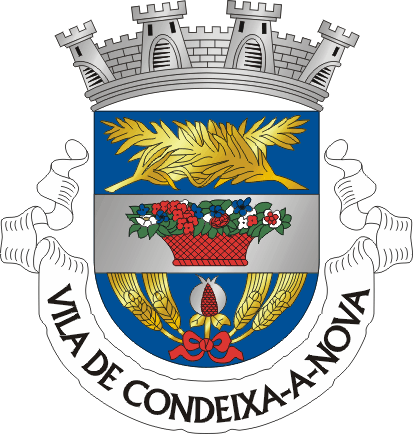
- Flag Coat of arms
- Interactive map of Condeixa-a-Nova
- Location in Portugal
- Coordinates: 40°07′N 8°30′W
- Country: Portugal
- Region: Centro
- Intermunic. comm.: Região de Coimbra
- District: Coimbra
- Parishes: 7

Area
  - Total: 138.67 km^{2} (53.54 sq mi)
- Highest elevation: 465 m (1,526 ft)
- Lowest elevation: 12 m (39 ft)

Population (2011)
  - Total: 17,078
  - Density: 123.16/km^{2} (318.97/sq mi)
- Time zone: UTC+00:00 (WET)
  - Summer (DST): UTC+01:00 (WEST)

Condeixa-a-Nova (Portuguese pronunciation: [kõˈdɐjʃa ˈnɔvɐ]), officially the Town of Condeixa-a-Nova (Portuguese: Vila de Condeixa-a-Nova), and often called simply Condeixa, is a town and a municipality in the district of Coimbra, Portugal. The population in 2011 was 17,078, in an area of 138.67 km^{2}. It is located 15 km south of Coimbra, and is part of the Região de Coimbra. The town is known for the ancient Roman settlement of Conímbriga which is located nearby and has both a museum and well-preserved ruins.

== Economy ==
The municipality of Condeixa-a-Nova is traditionally a center for agriculture. The municipality has also a number of industries ranging from ceramics to pharmaceuticals (Medinfar). The ancient Roman settlement of Conímbriga is an important tourist attraction.

== Parishes ==
Administratively, the municipality is divided into seven civil parishes (freguesias):

- Anobra
- Condeixa-a-Velha e Condeixa-a-Nova
- Ega
- Furadouro
- Sebal e Belide
- Vila Seca e Bem da Fé
- Zambujal

== Notable people ==
- Antão de Almada (1718 in Condeixa-a-Nova – 1797) the Grand Master of Ceremonies for the Royal House and first Captain-General of the Azores.
- Fernando Namora (1919 in Condeixa-a-Nova – 1989) a Portuguese writer and medical doctor.
