= Border river =

Border river may refer to

- a river that forms a natural border
- Border River, a 1954 film
