= Aires Pinto de Sousa Coutinho =

Portuguese noble and colonial administrator

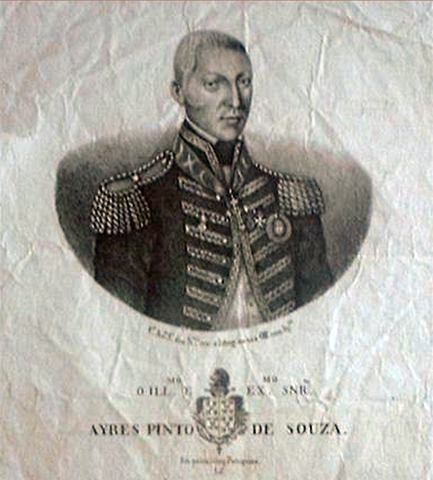

7th Captain-General of the Azores
- In office 9 September 1810 – 14 May 1817
- Monarch: John VI of Portugal
- Preceded by: Miguel António de Melo
- Succeeded by: Francisco António de Araújo e Azevedo
- Constituency: Azores

Personal details
- Born: Aires Pinto de Sousa Coutinho; May 12, 1778
- Died: May 21, 1836 (aged 58)
- Citizenship: Kingdom of Portugal
- Occupation: Governor General

Aires Pinto de Sousa Coutinho was a noble, colonial administrator, 6th Captain-General of the Azores, Marechal de campo and master of the House of Balsemão and Ferreiros de Tendais.

== Biography ==
He was born in Lamego, as second son of Luís Pinto de Sousa Coutinho, 1st Viscount of Balsemão, and his wife, Catarina Micaela de Sousa César de Lencastre, a distinguished poet.
Sousa Coutinho was a virtuous, religious person, generally characterized as polite and stern.

=== Captaincy-General ===
He was nominated to the post of Captain-General on 15 December 1809, and disembarked in Angra do Heroísmo on 7 September 1810, taking-up his post two days later.

Aires' governorship was linked to the creation of the Military Academy in Angra (decreed by King John VI); the construction of the military road of Praia (linking Angra and Praia) and the battery installed in the Fort of Santo António do Monte Brasil, in addition to the transformation of Ponta Delgada into a free trade zone (a consequence of the Peninsular Wars) and which ended the construction of the trans-Atlantic port in Vila Franca). Owing to anomalies created by the Portuguese Corte's stay in Angra, the municipal council of Angra requested that Aires Pinto create a tribunal to investigate.

Aires Pinto continued to support many of his predecessor's initiatives to maintain the islands' subsistence, including improving irrigation and distribution of potable water to Mosteiros and Ponta Delgada, and the establishment of the Junta de Melhoramento Agrícola (Agricultural Improvement Board). But, these failed to stop the revolts and protests caused by the shipment of wheat from Praia. In health, an epidemic of smallpox and contagious fevers, the General ordered the construction of an "ambulatory pharmacy", and provided the conditions to stem the epidemic. He also restricted hunting of partridge, quail, woodcocks and wild rabbit.

Sousa Coutinho was virtuous, religious and polite, but grave, and governed his mandate with competency and overall satisfaction. Following Napoleon's defeat at Waterloo, and exile to Elba, he had proclaimed, the drubbing of the "despot of France and jailer of Europe", before decreeing an amnesty and pardoning the deportees of the Amazonas.
