= Antão de Almada, 12th Count of Avranches =

His Lordship The Count of Avranches ComC
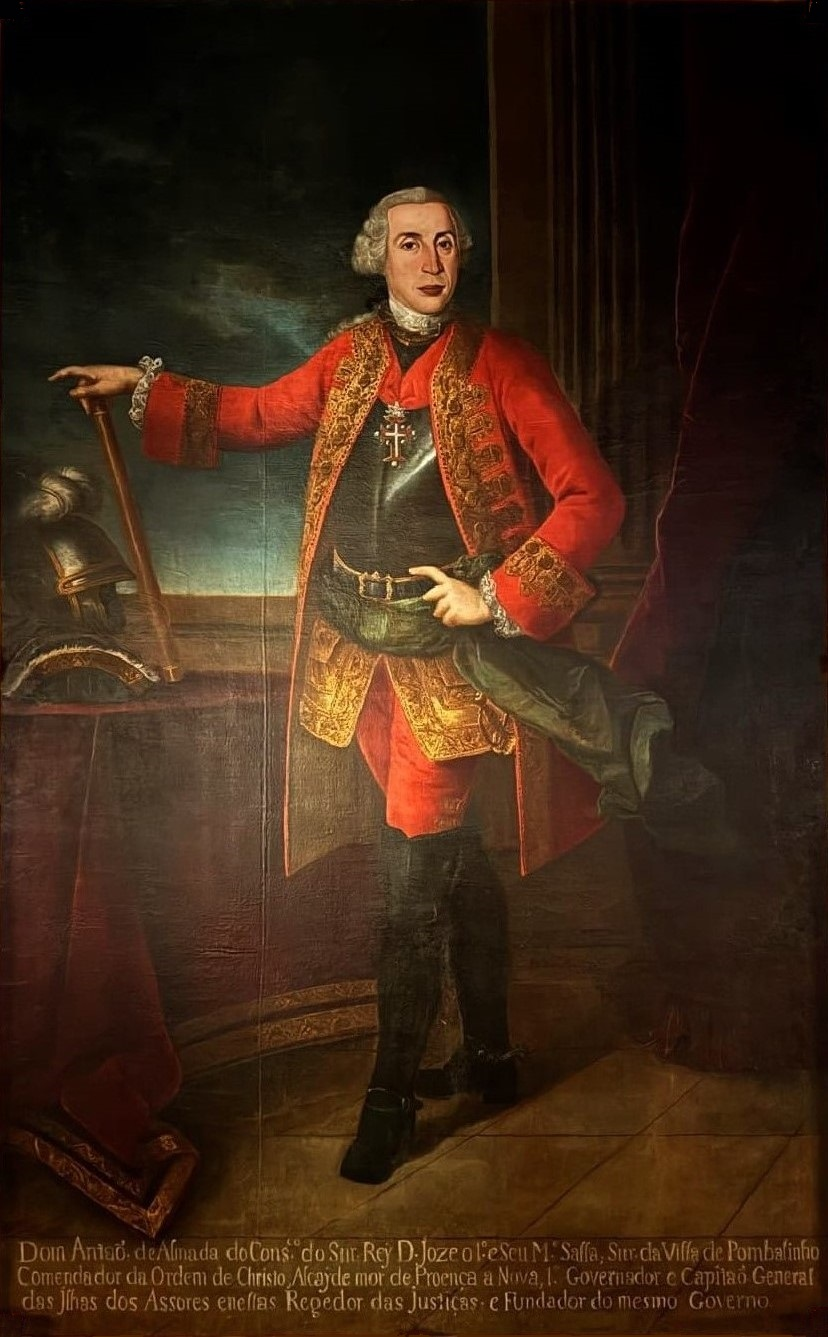
- Portrait by Miguel António do Amaral, c. 1766–1777, at the Angra do Heroísmo Captains General Palace

1st Captain-General of the Azores
- In office 1766–1774
- Monarch: Joseph
- Prime Minister: Sebastião José de Carvalho e Melo
- Succeeded by: Dinis Gregório de Melo Castro e Mendonça
- Constituency: Azores

Personal details
- Born: Antão de Almada; 19 April 1718 Condeixa-a-Nova
- Died: 26 January 1797 (aged 78) Lisbon, Kingdom of Portugal
- Resting place: Graça Convent
- Spouse: D. Violante Josefa de Almada Henriques
- Children: Lourenço José Boaventura de Almada, Count of Almada; Maria José do Carmo Xavier de Almada

D. Antão de Almada, 12th Count of Avranches, 9th Lord of Pombalinho and 14th Majorat of Lagares d'El-Rei (19 April 1718 – 26 January 1797) was the Grand Master of Ceremonies for the Royal House and, owing to his positions, made administrator of a few Portuguese colonies, including the first Captain-General of the Azores.

== Biography ==
Antão de Almada was born in 1718 in Condeixa-a-Nova, in paternal family palace: He was the son of Luís José de Almada, 10th Count of Avranches, 13th Majorat of Lagares d' El-Rei, and 8th Master of Pombalinho, and his spouse D. Violante of Portugal.

He obtained the status of fidalgo by charter on 21 June 1734, and knight on 1 November of the same year.

He married on 24 October 1756, D. Violante Josefa de Almada Henriques (11th Countess of Avranches and 10th Mistress of Pombalinho), who was his niece.

He obtained the position of deputy in the Estates General, and was part of the Royal Council, by order of Joseph I of Portugal (22 August 1766). and nominated in 1750 to the position of alcaide and commander of Proença-a-Velha.

=== Captaincy-General ===
Circled by military, social and religious figures he arrived in Angra on 28 September 1766 to preside as the first Presidente da Junta da Administração e Arrecadação da Real Fazenda e Governador e Capitão-General das Ilhas dos Açores (President of the Administrative Junta, Collector of the Royal Treasury and Governor/Captain-General of the Azores), a sequence of a charter dated 2 August 1766. He took office on 7 October.

During his tenure, Almada faced various problems, one of which was issues associated with local currency. At the time the Portuguese real was not the only currency in circulation, and many of the currencies circulating were counterfeit. Spanish coins, for example, circulated since the governorship of Rui da Câmara, expanded during the short reign of King Sebastian and, ultimately, expanded through returning emigres who worked in the colony of Brazil in the 17th century. He ordered this currency collected and sent to Lisbon. Agricultural reforms included ordering vacant municipal lands be rented out, clearing of bushlands and reduction of goats, due to their impacts on terrains. On Terceira Island (where he resided), he rebuilt the Angra customs-house, created a public yard to store wheat, installed new cranes in the port of Angra, revitalized the woad industry and repaired many of the island forts.

As a result of the Pombaline reforms, Almada was responsible for imposing the new directives, resulting in some violent conflicts following municipal elections: he was forced to intervene personally and, in the aftermath, even had a judge imprisoned. With the closing of the Jesuit College in 1759, there was a need to create schools to teach letters, Latin, philosophy, rhetoric and grammar. These reforms also included changes to local judiciary requiring juízes de fora (external judges) to operate by the municipal authority.

On 26 January 1771, by charter, the Azores became a "province" of Portugal, then later colony, before becoming a dependency of the Secretary of War. Almada governed with two Azorean counsels (João Cabral de Melo and Jose Vieira) until 1774 (although it is unclear when he returned to Lisbon). His governorship was best characterized as a regime of "good intentions", rather than long-term successes. After a century, Antão was described in the following terms:

"we hear that the King is very well served by him, honoring him, and elevating him for his position in office with dignity and science. He lived with his family, served by carriages, beautiful animals, pages and servants. He was very affable, a Courtier and almoner: mostly very gentle, attentive and listened to the vigilante parties; he did not meddle in other people's jurisdiction; and even as he arrived during the reforms, he was not really sported for the strength of his authority; but, he never needed to employ violent means to achieve his proposed goals. So much was the respect that even today his name is revered in these islands [Azores], and uttered with true reverence".

Many Azoreans were unmotivated by his policies and he only had effective power over Terceira Island.

== Later life ==
He died on 26 January 1797, aged 78, and was buried in his family chapel, in the church of the Graça Convent, in Lisbon.
