= Captaincy General of the Azores =

Government of the Azores (1766–1832)

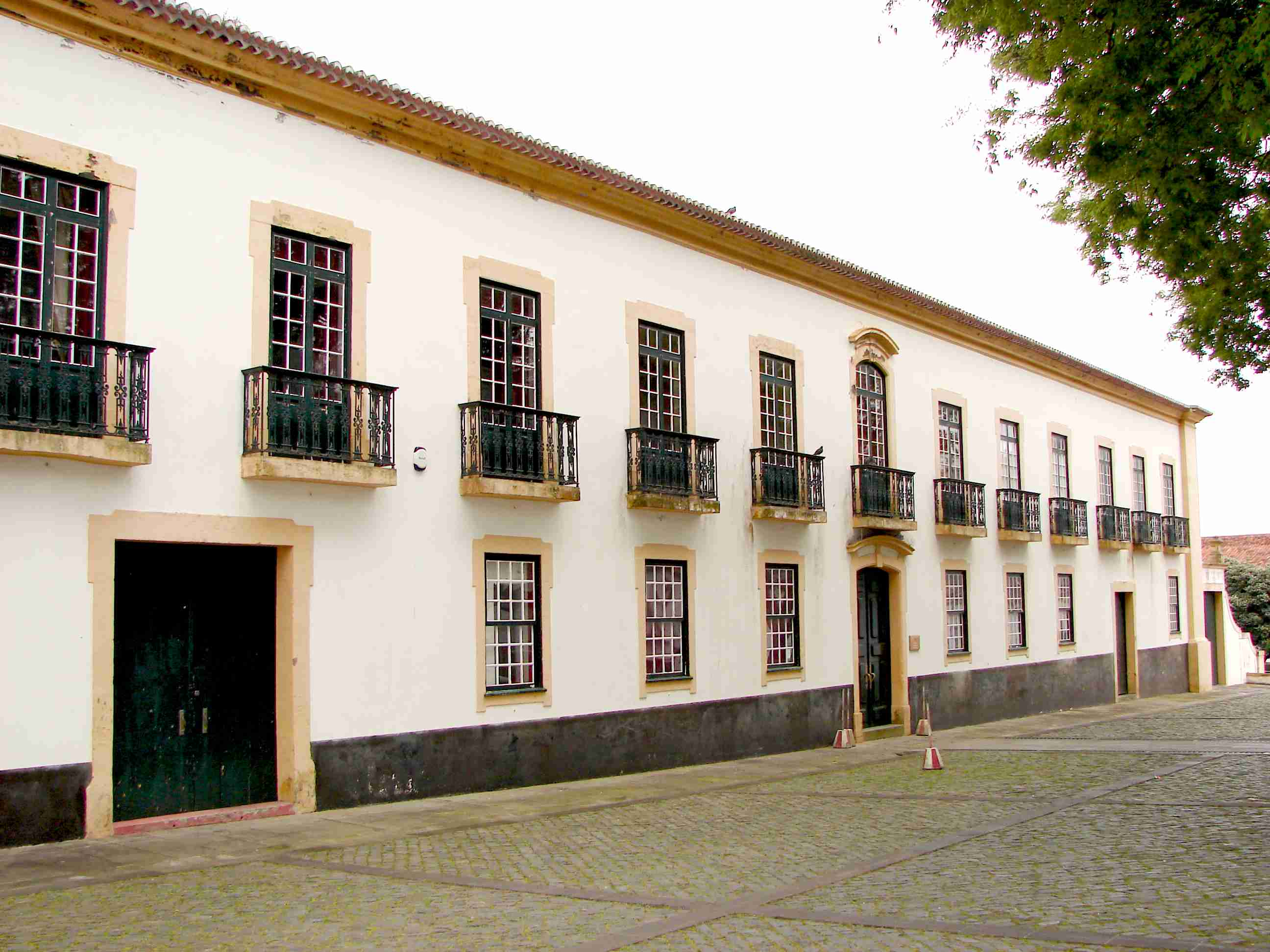
Exterior of the Palace of the Captain-General (Palácio dos Capitães Generais), where the Captain-General of the Azores presided.

The Captaincy General of the Azores was a politico-administrative structure of governance imposed in the Azores on 2 August 1766, with its seat in Angra. It remained the de facto system of governance for 65 years, until it was abolished on 4 June 1832 by D. Peter IV, but by 1828 its de jure status had made it nonoperational, owing to the revolutionary movements that lead to the Liberal Wars. The creation of the Captaincy-General was part of the Pombaline reforms to the Portuguese administration, during the reign of Joseph I, under the initiatives of Sebastião José de Carvalho e Melo, 1st Marquis of Pombal, then prime minister. A Captaincy-General operated from the Palace of the Captains-General, under the direction of the titular Captain-General, who operated as the Governor of the Azores, with additional jurisdiction on every island of the Azorean archipelago. The Captaincy-General was succeeded by the Province of the Azores, an ephemeral administrative structure that was collapse in the immediate years.

== History ==
The settlement of the Azores coalesced in the second half of the 15th century, in a late medieval context, that translated into the establishment of a governing structure based on the seigneur system. Effective governorship of each island was confided in a donatary, and his subordinates, the donatary-captains, resulting in a patchwork of development. Living far from direct power, the donatary-captains functioned with individual vice-regal rights, that allowed them to operate as local kings. But, parallel with this system, evolved the traditional Portuguese municipal model, wherein the islands were structured into municipalities, where the municipal organs assumed a great deal of the local governance.

Royal power, until this time was represented in the Corregedor, that traveled between the islands correcting, verifying and resolving issues associated with municipal laws and conflicts with the Donatary-captains. Spiritual power, was bestowed in the Order of Christ, and later in the Archdiocese of Funchal, before passing to the Bishopric of Angra after 1534.

With the ascension of King Manuel I, who was donatary of the islands, the donatary possessions were integrated into Crown possessions, resulting in a clear delineation of Royal and donatary powers. This alteration had an important effect on the islands, since the functions of the donatary captains were transferred, without exception, from resident officials on the islands to members of the high nobility resident in Portugal, who were represented locally by Ouvidores. The distancing of the Donatary-captains meant that the renting of lands to serfs no longer occurred, since all land remained the property of the Crown, through its assigned representatives: land distribution on the islands was essentially complete. This process essentially transferred feudal power to the aristocracy, who received 10% of the land rents and had little to no influence on local governance.

The abolishment of the Donatary-captains, an institution imposed due to the irregularity of the maritime communication, meant that power shifted to the municipal authorities, moderated by the interventions of the Corregedor. This resulted in increased local autonomy, with each municipality obtaining an independence based on distance from Royal or signeurial power, with any influence resulting from their proximity to other islands or local municipalities.

This level of autonomy was interrupted by the Spanish conquest of the islands, under Philip II of Spain, who placed their governance in the hands of his Military Governor in Angra. The concentration of administrative power in Angra during this period meant that, following the Portuguese Restoration War, the Crown made obliged to provide assurances to local politicians that the Azores would not function as a Vice-Regal fiefdom in the future. This guarantee was obtained during the Lisbon Cortes of 1645–1646, and the islands returned to its former administration for the preceding century.

The initiation of the Pombaline reforms were, therefore, anachronistic and contrary to the enlightened and centralizing spirit that inspired those policies. A reflection of a centralized and authoritarian system developing from the Pombaline reforms, although fundamentally a military institution, the jurisdiction of the Captaincy-General encompassed the civil administration, justice and economic sectors, conferring Vice-Royal status and series of powers that permitted the control of the public administration, including municipal institutions. The creation of the Captaincy-General marked the end of signeurial power on the islands, then embodied in the Donatary-captains and their overseers.

After 65 years of functioning and various events, the Captaincy-General was abolished under decree 28, 4 June 1832, signed in Ponta Delgada by Pedro IV, who created the Province of the Azores, a new administrative structure that collapsed within the immediate years.

=== Captaincy-General ===
It is not surprising that the unification of the Azorean government was necessary. The islands had continued subjects to the dominion of the Donatary-captains since the 15th century, even if interrupted by the Spanish Conquest of the Azores. Sebastião José de Carvalho e Melo, 1st Marquis of Pombal, ordered a complete change in the governance of the islands, which were put into effect by King Joseph I of Portugal, on 2 August 1766, resulting in the creation of the Captaincy-General of the Azores (a system that already existed in many of the overseas territories of the Portugal and Spain, in the Americas). Owing to being the seat of the only Diocese in the Azores, the city of Angra was selected as the capital of the Azores, and residence of the Captain-General.

The political and administrative unification of the archipelago was also a response to the disorder implanted in the public administration, and in particular in the areas of taxation and justice. The preamble of the charter, that created the Captaincy, justified the creation of the new politico-administrative authority only "the Terceiras islands, commonly called the Azores, adjacent to these Kingdoms...are a considerable part of them [and] by the kindness of its climate and for its distinct vassals who have their homes in them, so worthy of the same providence, which predecessor kings were masters at political, military and civil governments, to each and every one of the provinces of these kingdoms, and the state of Brazil and more domains overseas, creating in them governors and captains-general."

== Administration ==
The following were the captains-general installed in following years:

1. 1766–1774 – Antão de Almada, 12th Count of Avranches
2. 1774–1793 – Dinis Gregório de Melo Castro e Mendonça
3. 1793–1799 – Interim government, presided by Bishop José da Avé-Maria Leite da Costa e Silva and the Corregedor of Angra, Manuel José de Arriaga Brum da Silveira (who was substituted on 23 May 1795 by Luís de Moura Furtado and on 9 July 1795 by José Acúrsio das Neves). For his part the Bishop, citing age and ill health, solicited insistently his substitution, which was never accepted. He was finally substituted in 1796, owing to illness, by deacon Mateus Homem Borges da Costa;
4. 1799–1804 – Lourenço José Boaventura de Almada, Count of Almada;
5. 1804–1806 – José António de Melo da Silva César e Meneses, Count of São Lourenço;
6. 1806–1810 – Miguel António de Melo, Count of Murça;
7. 1810–1817 – Aires Pinto de Sousa Coutinho;
8. 1817–1820 – Francisco António de Araújo e Azevedo;
9. 1820–1821 – Francisco de Borja Garção Stockler;
10. 1821–1822 – (Liberal) Provisional Junta of the Supreme Government of the islands of the Azores (Junta Provisória do Supremo Governo das Ilhas dos Açores);
11. 1823–1823 – (Absolutist) Interim Junta Government of Angra (Junta de Governo Interino de Angra), composed of João Pereira Forjaz de Lacerda, Roberto Luís de Mesquita Pimentel and Luís de Meireles do Canto e Castro.
12. 1823–1824 – Francisco de Borja Garção Stockler
13. 1824–1828 – Manuel Vieira de Albuquerque Touvar
14. 1828–1828 – Interim government
15. 1828–1829 – Provisional junta
  1. 1828-1831 — Henrique da Fonseca de Sousa Prego, by the Miguelist party, governing in Ponta Delgada;
  2. 1829-1832 — António José Severim de Noronha, Count of Vila Flor and future Duke of Terceira, by the Liberal party, in the seat of the captaincy, in Angra. Menezes Severim de Noronha was the last Captain-General, governing until the extinction of the Captaincy-General of the Azores.
