= Miguel António de Melo =

Portuguese nobleman and colonial administrator

His Excellency The Count of Murça
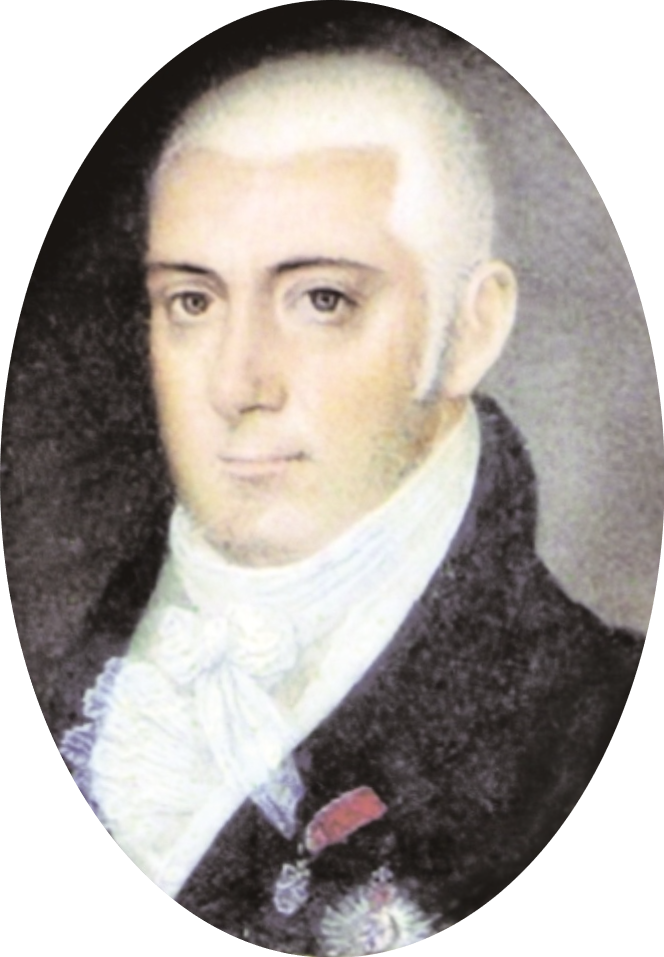

6th Captain-General of the Azores
- In office 1806–1810
- Monarch: John VI of Portugal
- Preceded by: José António de Melo da Silva César e Meneses
- Succeeded by: Aires Pinto de Sousa Coutinho

Personal details
- Born: Miguel António de Melo de Abreu Soares de Brito Barbosa Palha Vasconcelos Guedes; 25 December 1766 Lisbon
- Died: 7 August 1826 (aged 59) Lisbon
- Citizenship: Kingdom of Portugal
- Occupation: Governor General

Miguel António de Melo (Lisbon; 25 December 1766 - Lisbon; 7 August 1836), a nobleman, colonial administrator (as the fifth Captain-general of the Azores) and the 1st Count of Murça. He was young nobleman who exercised a position in the Royal court of Portugal, 14th Lord of Murça and Castro Daire, squire of Figueira, commander of Santa Maria de Freixas in the Order of Christ and honorary member of the Royal Academy of Sciences, in addition to holding several political offices, including that of governor and captain-general of Angola, minister and peer of the realm, appointed to a commission, by King John VI of Portugal, to draft a constitution for Portugal, minister and peer of the realm.

== Biography ==
He was born in the civil parish of Pena, son of D. João Domingos de Melo Abreu Soares Barbosa e Palha, gentleman of the primogeniture of Fonte Boa, and his wife, Joaquina Mariana de Noronha, a first family linked to the Portuguese aristocracy.

His father was a descendant of the Guedes (Vaz Guedes) family, from the town of Murça in the province of Trás-os-Montes, which they had owned as a lordship since the 14th century. That is the reason why the title of Count of Murça was given to him.

In 1781, he received a royal commission to the Cortes, joining the Council of State of Queen Maria I of Portugal.

=== Captaincy-General of Angola ===
Between 1797 and 1802 he was the governor and captain-general for Portuguese Angola. After a journey that required him transit through Salvador da Baía, he arrived in Luanda on 28 July 1797, where he was installed on 1 August 1797. As governor of Angola he left several public works, that included the construction of the Governor's Palace in Luanda, and the installation in Calumbo, of an iron furnace, using the deposits in Golungo, initiating the extraction of the mineral in Angola. He also preoccupied himself with education in Angola and to issues of Catholic missionaries, where he solicited the closing of the Junta of Missions, noting that this institution did not function and was unnecessary. On 18 March 1693, by royal decree, this institution was abolished. In its place, he proposed measures to attract more clergy, to be paid by the Royal Finances, without presenting testimonials to the Captains-mor.

Returning through Salvador da Baía in 1797, as it was typical in the time, he made several observations that he then transformed into Informaçam da Bahia de Todos os Santos (Information on the Bay of All Saints). The Informaçam, a manuscript of nine pages, revealed an acute sense of observation and developed a critical spirit and placed him in the echelon of the Portuguese literary experts.

In 1800 he was appointed Governor of Pernambuco, but never assumed the position, remaining in Luanda to continue his governorship and captaincy of Angola. His mandate ended on 24 August 1802, transferring his title/role to Fernando António Soares de Noronha, his uncle, and returned to Lisbon.

=== Captaincy-General of the Azores ===
On the eve of the Peninsular Wars, he was appointed governor and captain-general of the Azores on 24 March 1806. He disembarked in Angra, then regional capital of the Captaincy General of the Azores on 4 May 1806, taking-up his role on the 10 May. On his arrival Miguel António was confronted by a famine on the island of São Miguel, and later by French invasion of Portugal, resulting in the transfer of the Portuguese Court to Brazil. On Junot's invasion, Miguel severed ties with the continent, now in the possession of the French forces; he ignored orders from Lisbon, supported by the exiled Royal family. When Junot's forces were expelled, the English liberators entered the picture, functioning with Vice-Regal authority, maintaining a duality between the power in Lisbon and that in Rio de Janeiro, making the Captains-General dependent functionaries of the state.

His governorship in the Azores was characterized by attempts to bring more structure to the municipal government, while establishing privileges for the local aristocracy, in the local municipalities. The captain-general ordered that municipal authorities be members of the nobility or men of letters. Miguel António challenged the constant problem of agricultural subsistence and exports, by prohibiting exports, thus eliminating the spectre of famine, but creating economic problems for merchants. Melo then decreed the free export of foodstuffs, except in cases of famine, obliging exporters to sell them to the Celeiro Publico (public storehouse).

His acts as captain-general and governor was criticized by an English journalist, editor of the 1813 Naval Chronicle, published in London. In his defense, he published a response to counter the negative insinuations.

== Later life ==
He died on 7 August 1836, in the parish of Santos-o-Velho in Lisbon.
