= Henrique da Fonseca de Sousa Prego =

Portuguese politician

10th Captain-General of the Azores
- In office 20 June 1828 – 5 September 1833
- Monarchs: Miguel of Portugal; Maria II of Portugal
- Preceded by: Manuel Vieira de Albuquerque Touvar
- Constituency: Azores

Personal details
- Born: 19 April 1768
- Died: 25 March 1847 (aged 78) Gaeiras, Óbidos, Kingdom of Portugal

Henrique da Fonseca de Sousa Prego (19 April 1768 – 25 March 1847) was a Portuguese naval officer and last Captain-General of the Azores nominated by King Miguel I. He is recognized for his role in the transfer of the Portuguese court to Brazil and in the voyage of Princess Maria Leopoldina da Austria to Brazil.

== Biography ==
Henrique da Fonseca Sousa Prego was born in Lisbon, civil parish of São Tomé. He was baptized on 19 April 1768; his godfather was Dr. Silvestre de Sousa Vilas Boas, a member of the Sousa Prego of Sintra, a small local aristocratic family. On 12 February 1781 he was recognized as a knight in the Royal House.

=== Military career ===
He reportedly began his naval service on 8 February 1783, and quickly promoted to lieutenant by 1784. More than a decade later (in 1791), he had risen to the position of lieutenant captain, and then frigate captain by 1796, gaining the title of capitão de mar e guerra in 1801. In this context, he was already the oldest member of the Navy with command preference. In 1800 he commanded several war vessels in the Captaincy of Rio Grande de São Pedro, where he outlined several ideas to improve Bahia's naval defense, that were put into practice from 1802 to 1806, when he was Naval Quartermaster for the Captaincy of Bahia. Over time he became division chief, squadron commander and vice-admiral.

Furthermore, Sousa Prego captained and was part of two important squads. In 1807 and 1808 he was responsible for the 74-gun ship Medusa in the squadron that brought the Portuguese Royal Family/Cortes to Brazil. In this role, his command was responsible for protecting the squadron's rear guard when the squadron departed Lisbon on 29 November 1807. In 1817, he was one of the captains in command of a squadron that brought Princess Leopoldina, already married by proxy to Prince Pedro, to Brazil. In this context, he was head of the squadron that left Livorno and arrived in Rio de Janeiro on 5 December 1817. Sousa Prego's last post in Brazil was in 1822, when he was appointed commander of a squadron that patrolled the coast of Captaincy of Bahia.

== Captaincy of the Azores ==
Back in Portugal he was appointed Governor and Captain-General of the Azores, having left for Angra do Heroísmo, aboard the frigate Princesa Real, on 20 June 1828, with the aim of replacing the much contested Captain-General Manuel Vieira de Albuquerque Touvar.

Two days after his departure for Lisbon, on 22 June, a liberal uprising took place in Angra do Heroísmo which, with the support of the 5th Battalion, in order to reestablish the Portuguese Constitutional Charter of 1826, and expelled the former ruler, Touvar. But, when Sousa Prego arrived in the region he was prevented from disembarking, and his luggage was seized and sold in a public square. Touver was already in exile in Ponta Delgada (where Sousa Prego initially went) before leaving for Lisbon. Returning to Lisbon, Sousa Prego discovered that D. Miguel I had staged a coup and taken power as absolute monarch. On 5 August 1828 he was reappointed Captain-General of the Azores and was responsible for leading a squadron that would regain power in the archipelago. Following an easy absolutist victory in Madeira, and at the end of October, he had already arrived in the Azores. On 4 November he left for Terceira, with the aim of negotiating. His negotiating stance was contrary to D. Miguel's authoritarian and aggressive stance. In this regard, Charles John Napier, then 1st Viscount of Cabo de São Vicente, recorded that Sousa Prego, "during his government, never obeyed the bloodthirsty instructions transmitted to him by the government [of D. Miguel]".

From Ponta Delgada, he began to manage the scattered absolutist islands under his control. He also established a blockade on the island of Terceira, the only one still in the hands of the liberals. The blockade, however, was unsuccessful. The liberals gradually managed to reinforce their presence on the island, bringing in emigrants from England and France and maintaining communication with the liberal Cortes in Brazil. As a result of the ineffectiveness of the blockade, the island's defense was consolidated, particularly after the arrival, on 22 June 1829, of António José de Sousa Manuel de Menezes Severim de Noronha (the Count of Vila Flor), accompanied by a large group of emigres. Noronha had been invested as Governor and Captain-General by the liberal Government-in-Exile (by royal letter dated 5 April 1829) by Queen D. Maria II with the assistance of the Marquis of Palmela, then minister of Portugal in London. In this way, the Captaincy-General of the Azores had two rival titular governors: a liberal government in Angra (defending Terceira) and an absolutist government headquartered in Ponta Delgada (that controlled the other islands). But, faced with the deteriorating military situation in the Azores from various insurrections, D. Miguel I decided in July 1829 to order an attack on the island of Terceira. To this end, he sent the majority of his armada, commanded by José Joaquim da Rosa Coelho and battalion under the direction of Colonel José António de Azevedo Lemos, to the Azores to be joined by the remainder of his forces in Ponta Delgada, under the command of Sousa Prego, to attack Angra.

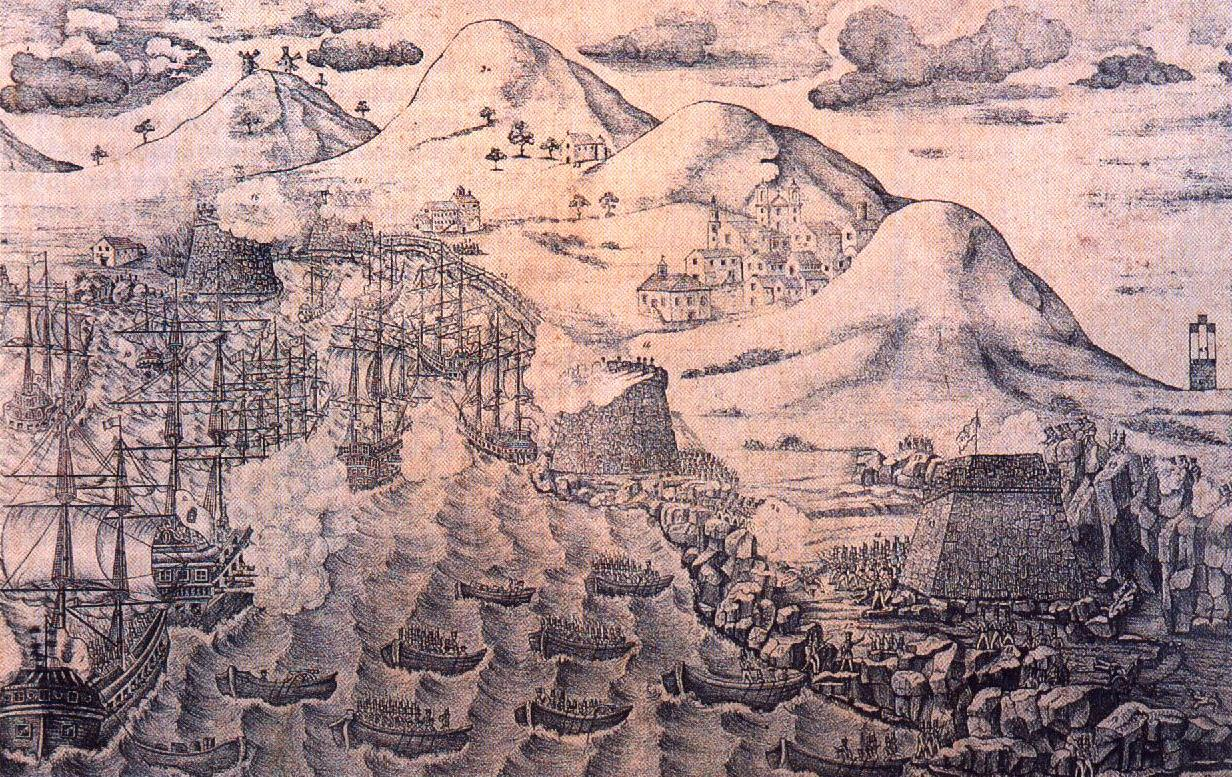
Batalha da Praia da Vitória (11 August 1829)

The defeat of Miguelist forces at the Battle of Praia on 11 August 1829, resulted in the defeat the Miguelist party in the Azores. Sousa Prego and Rosa Coelho were accused of a lack of zeal and firmness in preparing the landing and executing the operation. Shortly after, Miguelist forces were obliged to disperse their forces between the other islands, with a considerable part of the squadron returning to Lisbon. Little by little, the Absolutists began to lose control over the remaining islands to liberal forces. Finally, at the Battle of Ladeira da Velha on the island of São Miguel, Sousa Prego's forces were defeated. Practically without resistance, the island was conquered in August of that same year. Sousa Prego had to take refuge in the house of the English Consul and flee to Lisbon. On 19 September 1831 he obtained royal authorization to justify the defeats suffered and his conduct before a Council of War. The council was formed with great difficulty, never having deliberated on the case. Meanwhile, the admiral saw his pay reduced by half and was publicly blamed for the defeat suffered and the serious consequences of the Miguelist cause. Once the liberal victory was complete, Sousa Prego was dismissed by the decree of 5 September 1833. However, under the terms of the letter date 24 August 1840, he was subsequently reinstated as a Vice-Admiral, but separated from the permanent staff of the Navy.

=== Later life ===
He retired in 1842, and lived in Casa das Gaeiras (in the parish of the same name in the municipality of Óbidos) until he died on 25 March 1847. He was buried in the Chapel of São Marcos, in his home, his tomb inscribed with: Here lies Vice Admiral H.F.S.P. who served the King and Country faithfully for more than 60 years.

=== Descendants ===
One of his great-grandsons, Ezequiel Epifânio da Fonseca de Sousa Prego, was made Viscount of Sousa Prego by decree on 10 May 1894, by King D. Carlos I of Portugal.

== See also ==
- Captaincy-General of the Azores
