= Manuel Vieira de Albuquerque Touvar =

Portuguese politician

9th Captain-General of the Azores
- In office 21 May 1824 – 22 June 1828
- Monarchs: Peter IV of Portugal; Maria II of Portugal
- Preceded by: Francisco de Borja Garção Stockler
- Succeeded by: Henrique da Fonseca de Sousa Prego
- Constituency: Azores

Captaincy of Espírito Santo
- In office December 1804 – December 1811
- Monarch: Maria I of Portugal
- Constituency: Espirito Santo (Brazil)

Personal details
- Born: 28 April 1776
- Died: 14 June 1833 (aged 89) Lisbon, Kingdom of Portugal

Manuel Vieira de Albuquerque Touvar (28 April 1776 – 14 June 1833 in Lisbon) was a Portuguese nobleman who served first as Captain General in the colony of Brazil, but ultimately as the 9th Captain General of the archipelago of the Azores.

== Career ==
In the reign of Maria I of Portugal, Touvar governed the Captaincy of Espírito Santo, in the Portuguese colony of Brazil between December 1804 and December 1811. The early part of his work in Espírito Santo involved pursuing and attacking natives within his territory, a governmental practice that had in its objective the expansion of internal navigation. In 1803, the indigenous population had attacked Porto de Souza, leaving the garrison of Coutins totally destroyed. In 1809, Touvar pursued the natives while founding (in the ashes of the former garrison of Coutins) the base for the settlement of Linhares, in homage to D. Rodrigo de Souza Coutinho, who was instituted as Count of Linhares.

Touvar served in the monarch's Council of State as a colonel in the Portuguese cavalry and Commander in the Order of Aviz under John VI of Portugal. He was governor of Angola and was considered a disciplined functionary of the crown.

=== Captaincy of the Azores ===
After 1823, the reformist politics of the Count of Subserra (a Terceirense), powerful minister of John VI of Portugal, reestablished the Captaincy-General of the Azores, giving it a new politico-administrative organization for the territory. Touvar was appointed 9th Captain-General for the Azores on 21 May 1824, and took up residence in the city of Angra on 11 June 1824.

In 1825, King D. John VI was forced to recognize the independence of Brazil, where his son (D. Pedro) reigned as Emperor since 1822. Taking advantage of these events, the Infante D. Miguel and Queen D. Carlota Joaquina nurtured a movement to distance Pedro from the throne of Portugal. Following the death of D. John VI, D. Pedro relinquished his title to the throne of Portugal in favour of his daughter D. Maria da Glória (who would reign as D. Maria), initially under the regency of her sister Isabel Maria. Following the 10 March 1826 abdication by D. Pedro, Queen D. Maria II signed a new Constitutional Charter and sent to the Azores Lord Stuart to promulgate the law and swear fealty to the new monarch. The municipalities of Ponta Delgada and Angra declared their loyalties to the Crown and new charter between 21 and 23 August 1826, in solemn ceremonies adhered by members of the three Estates General.

But, with rising tensions between Absolutists and Liberals, D. Pedro decided to marry his daughter, Queen D. Maria II (who was still a minor), to his brother (D. Miguel) and transfer to him the Regency, thereby avoiding conflict. Miguel was in exile in Austria, due to his early attempt to usurp the throne, but returned. Azoreans, generally, favoured the grand compromise, and Touvar, who was an Absolutist supporter, ordered three days of celebrations, immediately showing his antipathy towards Liberals. But, after several months, Miguel and his Absolutist faction staged a coup, and acclaimed Miguel King on 17 May 1828. The Absolutist counter-revolution eventually reached the Azores on 16 May 1828, and Touvar, aligning himself with the absolutists, sent orders to every island in the archipelago to swear fealty to the new monarch.

When a boat delivering these orders docked in Velas on 11 June 1828, its military officers discovered that local authorities were hesitant and poorly motivated to acclaim the Infante King in the islands of the Azores. Following the Liberal Revolution, Touvar was deposed 22 June 1828, owing to his sympathies for the absolutists of the island of Terceira.

== Later life ==
Touvar died in Lisbon on 14 June 1833.
