= Paço de Lanheses =

Manor house in Viana do Castelo, Portugal

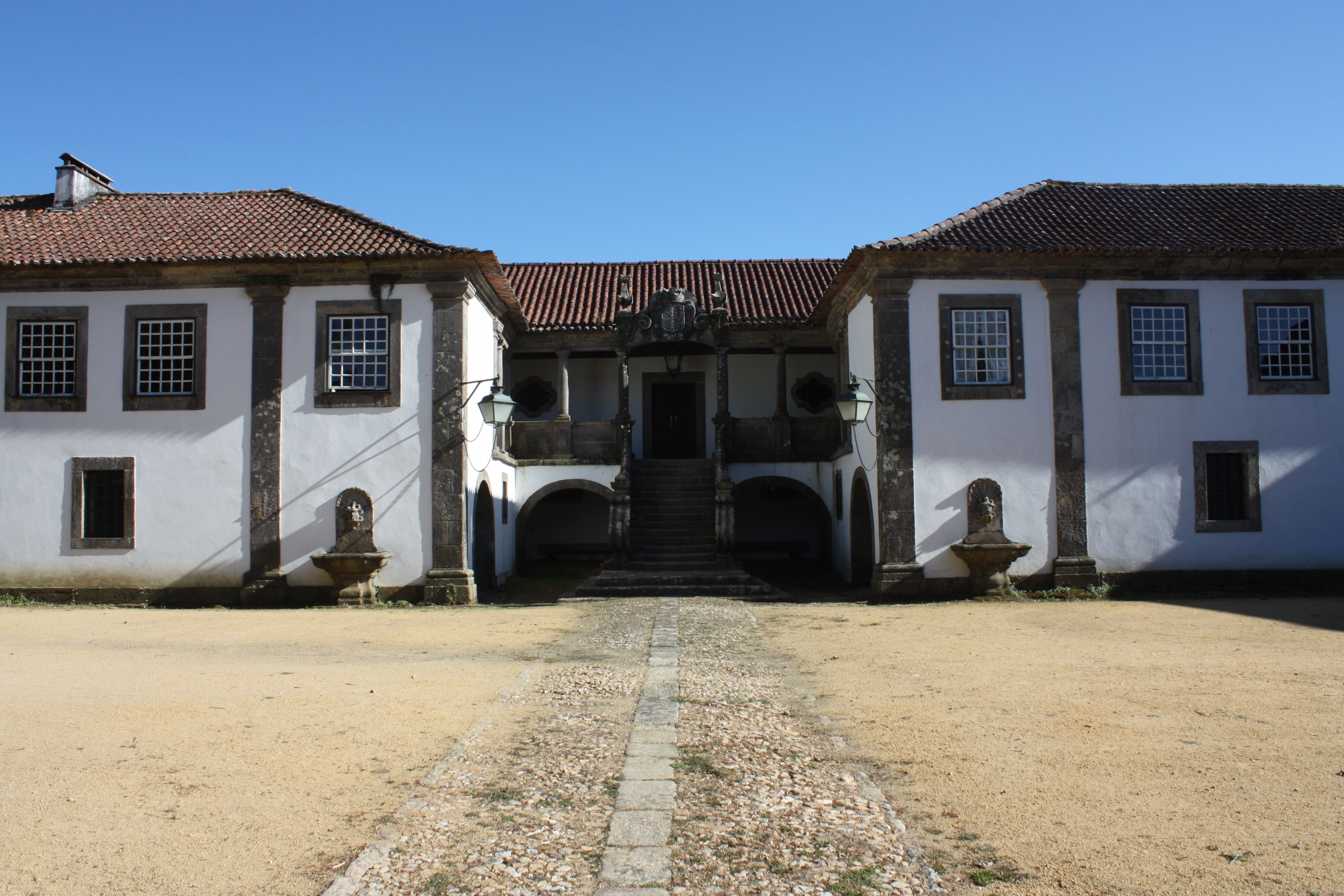
- Paço de Lanheses, part of North facade
- Interactive map of the Paço de Lanheses area

General information
- Type: Manor house (Solar)
- Architectural style: Northern Portuguese manorial
- Location: Lanheses, Viana do Castelo, Portugal
- Opened: c. 1550-1737
- Owner: Private|Private

Technical details
- Material: Granite

Paço de Lanheses is a historic manor house, with a private chapel, and agricultural estate in Viana do Castelo, Minho Province, Norte Region, Portugal. It is registered as a historic property of public interest by the Portuguese Government’s IGESPAR institute.

The house construction began in the 16th century but was totally refurbished in the 18th century and now was reformed to adapt to rural tourism with the service of bed and breakfasts.

The property belonged to the family Almada, descendant and representative of the famous knight Álvaro Vaz de Almada (c. 1390 – 1449), recipient of the Order of the Garter and the English noble title the earl of Avranches. Later also have the Portuguese noble title earl of Almada.
