= José da Avé-Maria Leite da Costa e Silva =

Portuguese bishop (1727–1799)

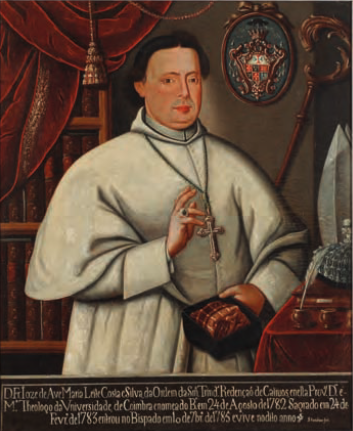
- D. Friar José da Avé-Maria Leite da Costa e Silva, a portrait at the Museu of Angra do Heroísmo

3rd Captain-General of the Azores (Interim)
- In office 1793–1799
- Preceded by: Dinis Gregório de Melo Castro e Mendonça
- Succeeded by: Mateus Borges da Costa (Caretaker)
- Constituency: Azores

Personal details
- Born: 10 February 1727 Santo Antão, Évora
- Died: 30 October 1799 (aged 72) Angra do Heroísmo
- Citizenship: Kingdom of Portugal

D. Friar José da Avé-Maria Leite da Costa e Silva
- Bishop of Angra
- Church: Sé Cathedral of Angra
- Province: São João Evangalista
- Diocese: Angra
- Elected: 24 August 1782
- In office: 24 February 1783
- Predecessor: João Marcelino dos Santos Homem Aparício
- Successor: José Pegado de Azevedo

José da Avé-Maria Leite da Costa e Silva (10 February 1727, Santo Antão — 30 October 1799, Angra) was the 23rd Bishop of the Diocese of Angra, governing from 1783 to 1799. He was also, between 1793 and 1799, president of the interim government of the Captaincy-General of the Azores, owing to a lack of nominated titleholders.

== Biography ==
Born in the civil parish of Santo Antão, in the municipality of Évora, he was the son of Manuel da Costa Leite and Bárbara da Conceição. At 15 years of age, on 19 May 1742, he entered the Trinitarian Order, dedicated to the celebration of the Holy Trinity.

Transferred to a convent in Coimbra, he began his preparatory studies, obtaining a doctorate in theology from the University of Coimbra on 12 January 1755.

=== Career ===
He began teaching theology in the colleges of the Order, obtaining a great fame for his mastery of the subject. He was elected rector of the Trinitarian college in Coimbra, as well as defender of the faith and provincial cleric to Coimbra. In the same year that he obtained his doctorate, he was named qualifier to the Inquisition and then synodal examiner for the Archbishop of Évora and Three Military Orders.

With a reputation for theology and oratory, he was presented to Queen D. Maria I of Portugal as a candidate for the bishopric of the Diocese of Angra on 24 August 1782, being confirmed by the Vatican on 26 December of the same year. The episcopal consecration occurred in the church of the Trinitarian Convent of Lisbon, on 24 February 1783.

==== Bishop of Angra ====
Consecrated as the 23rd Bishop of Angra, he did not immediately travel to his posting but remained in Lisbon, taking the Diocese by proxy on 25 March of the year (where he nominated Dr. José Vieira Bettencourt as his governor). The new prelate only arrived in Angra on 10 December 1785, arriving during an agricultural economic crisis; a combination of excessive wind and rain in the winter, and a dry spring/summer had resulted in the destruction of wheat fields, resulting in an island-wide famine, a situation that Francisco Ferreira Drummond writes about in his 1785 annals, "a quintessential famin". This situation made the new bishop request, by circular of 10 May 1786, that the clergy of Terceira pray pro tempore FAMIS Masses, since they "never" encounter the island under the "scourge of hunger". It had gotten so bad, that the poor collected roots and rhizomes from junça (a plant from the family Cyperaceae) and ferns to make bread. Malnutrition spread across many families, and the Captain-General at the time lost hope over the calamity.

Friar José da Avé-Maria interested himself with the indoctrination of the Christians and the morals and education of the Diocesan clerics. He exercised important actions with the Azorean clergy, reflecting the thoughts of the Church and pastoral communications from Pope Benedict XIV. In one of his pastoral communications, the Pope encouraged Azorean Catholics to live a better life in the following year (21 December 1786); reminded the clergy of their obligation to share with them the "bread of the doctrine of Christ" (9 May 1888); lamented that little was done about the frequency of moral lectures (25 May 1788); prohibited the abuses during the Easter week ceremonies (8 May 1791); and appealed that they should abandon ignorance, especially those in the ecclesiastical state; and further, ordered that ecclesiastical habits be used (23 June 1792). He was particularly interested in the questions related to the good order of the cult and the ecclesiastical customs, recommending that the ordained in sacris use their habits:

"to wear in the cities the cassock and never without them when they say Mass, and in the field honest colours, serious shape, indicative of the gravity and composure ... always wearing their collar and serious buckles and unused buttons, in coats, which are not the same cloth or wool of the same color...".

At the same time, he permitted the substitution of the organ with orchestra in the convents, which permitted a greater diversity of sacred music. He also interested himself in the renovation of various canonical institutions, authoring statutes for the Shelter of Jesus, Maria and José for Angra, also known as the Mónicas, renovating the statutes of the Sé Cathedral on 7 December 1797, which were only approved by his successor (and suffered some alterations along the way).

During the 13 years in which he governed the Diocese he visited the parishes of Terceira (between 1787 and 1791) and São Miguel (1789), while the other islands were visited by his deacon Manuel Cardoso de Serpa (visiting in the name of the prelate). During his visit to São Miguel, Friar José da Avé-Maria consecrated the Church of Nossa Senhora da Conceição (in the Monastery of São Francisco) and appeased the rift that existed between the nuns of the Convent of Nossa Senhora da Esperança, who had opted for the Franciscan Order over the remaining nuns who chose diocesan obedience.

It was friar José da Avé-Maria who was responsible for implementing a diocesan seminary, owing to governmental insistence on promoting youth education and on improving clerical education in the Azores. With the objective of establishing this seminary, he proposed the partial use of the Jesuit College in São Miguel, which at the time was abandoned. Classes at the seminary would include Latin, Rhetoric, Ethics, Metaphysics and Moral Theology. In order to support the new establishment, he proposed incorporating the taxes of the collegians from the Conceição dos Clérigos in Praia, Vila de São Sebastião, Santa Bárbara and Vila Nova, as well as a few from the central islands. His idea was to promote the Portuguese government's acceptance, who rejected the proposal, and it was eventually postponed.

==== Capitaincy-General ====
The 1770 Pombaline ordinance dictated that in case of the death of the captain-general, an interim government should be appointed consisting of the bishop and corregedor of the Azores. With the death of Dinis Gregório de Melo Castro e Mendonça in 1793, José da Avé-Maria was installed as the presiding official, as Bishop of Angra.

The interim government was debilitated by a financial crisis and fears of the French, that continued for six years. The issue of counterfeit currency continued, and turned into a real financial catastrophe: the municipal authorities in Angra and Ponta Delgada could not resolve problems with fake currency, and the interim government was not assisted by the Corregadors involvement with the counterfeiters. The Bishop was able to have the government of D. Maria substitute the Corregedor by Moura Furtado, which improved the situation, resulting in removal of the false currency and arrest of various people. As a consequence of the Napoleonic Wars (in which the Portuguese aligned with England), the islands' defenses were in a terrible state, with many of its forts and fortifications in ruin or abandoned (from several years of peace).

Due to delays in the nomination of a new Captain-General, the interim continued to function between 1793 and 1799. Yet, the Bishop's health had deteriorated in the intervening period, and José da Avé-Maria repeatedly requested his deferment, beginning in 1796. His nerves frazzled and fearing a possible French invasion, Moura Furtado abandoned his post, after various requests to the Queen's government. Deacon Mateus Borges da Costa effectively ran the government at this time.

=== Later life ===
D. José da Ave-Maria died in Angra on 30 October 1799, and was a wise and peaceful bishop, much appreciated for his life, who was devoid of pomp, being almoner and benignly indulgent with offenders.
