= Province of the Azores =

The Province of the Azores was an administrative unit of Portugal encompassing the archipelago of the Azores between 1832 and 1833. It was created by Decree 28 of 4 June 1832 and signed by Peter IV in the name of his daughter, Queen Maria II of Portugal.

The Province of the Azores resulted from the abolishment of the Captaincy-General of the Azores, but retained its capital in the city of Angra do Heroísmo, on the island of Terceira. The administrative territory was divided three comarcas: Angra, administered by a prefect; Ponta Delgada, and Horta, administered by sub-prefects.

The Province of the Azores was abolished on 28 June 1833 by Decree 64, which divided the archipelago into two separate provinces: the Província Oriental dos Açores (Eastern Province of the Azores), that included the islands of São Miguel and Santa Maria, with its capital in Ponta Delgada; and the Província Ocidental dos Açores (Western Province of the Azores), with its capital in Angra and administrating the remaining islands of the archipelago.

== Administration ==
Prefect:

1. 1832-1833 — Francisco Saraiva da Costa Refóios, 1st Baron of Ruivós

Sub-Prefect of Ponta Delgada:

1. 1832-1833 — Luís Ribeiro de Sousa Saraiva;
2. 1833-1833 — António José de Ávila (did not take office, since he was never permitted to disembark in Ponta Delgada);
3. 1833-1833 — José Caetano Dias do Canto e Medeiros (refused to take office);
4. 1833-1833 — Felix Pereira de Magalhães (refused the nomination).

Sub-Prefect of Horta:

1. 1832-1833 — António Mariano de Lacerda;
2. 1833-1833 — António José de Ávila.
