= Quinta dos Lagares d'El-Rei =

- Solar da Quinta dos Lagares d'El-Rei
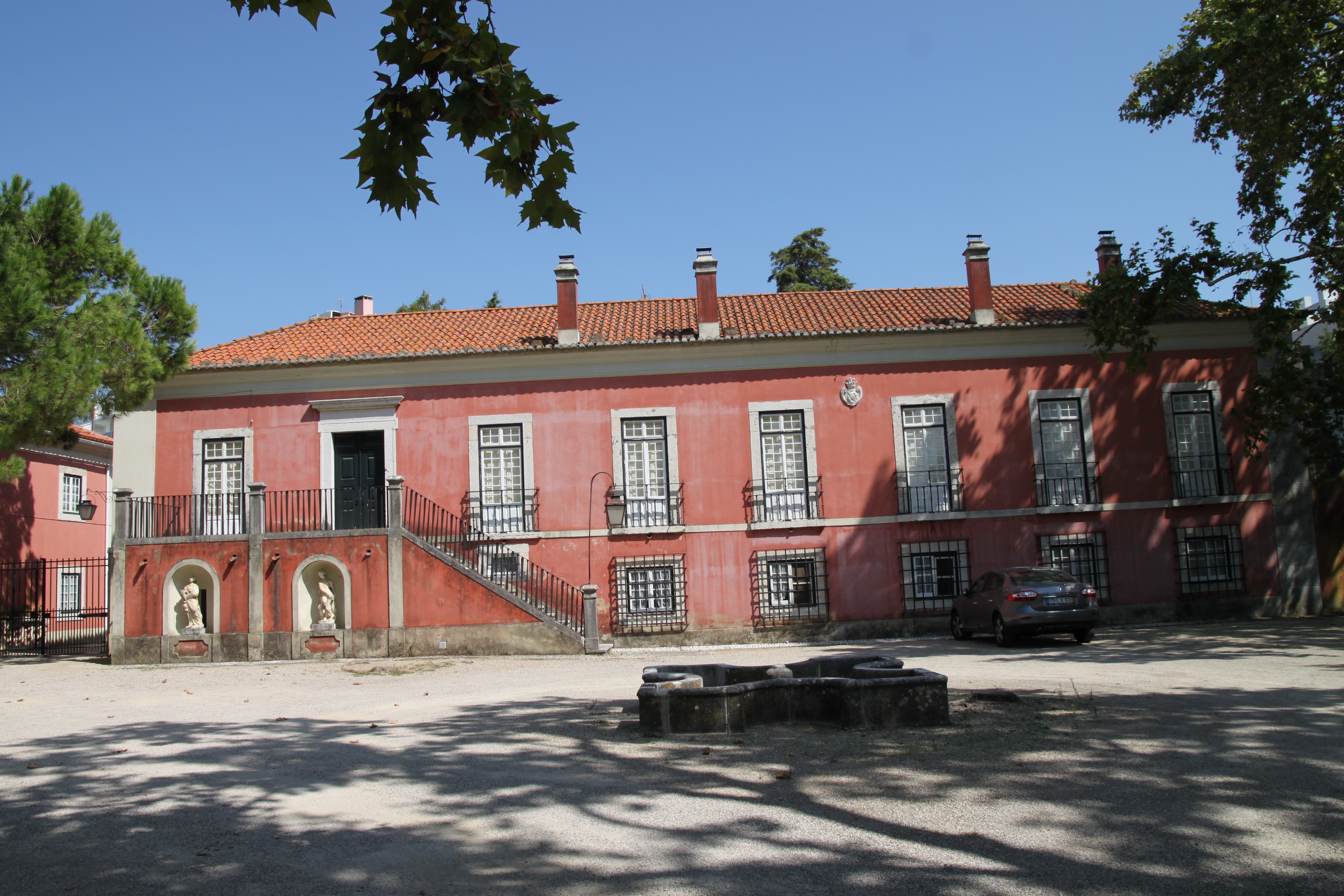
- The front facade of the manor house

- Location of the manorhouse within the municipality of Lisbon

General information
- Type: Quinta
- Architectural style: Manueline
- Location: Alvalade, Lisbon, Portugal
- Coordinates: 38°44′51″N 09°08′05″W
- Owner: Portuguese Republic

Technical details
- Material: Mixed masonry

The Quinta dos Lagares d'El-Rei (Portuguese: Solar da Quinta dos Lagares d'El-Rei; [ˈkĩtɐ ðuʒ lɐˈɣaɾɨʒ ðɛl ˈʁɐj], "Estate of the King's Wine-Vats"), is a quinta and manor house on the Portuguese estate of Quinta dos Lagares d'El-Rei, part of the Senhorio dos Lagares d'El-Rei (the Majorat of Lagares), a feudal fiefdom, seated in the civil parish of Alvalade, in the municipality of Lisbon.

== History ==
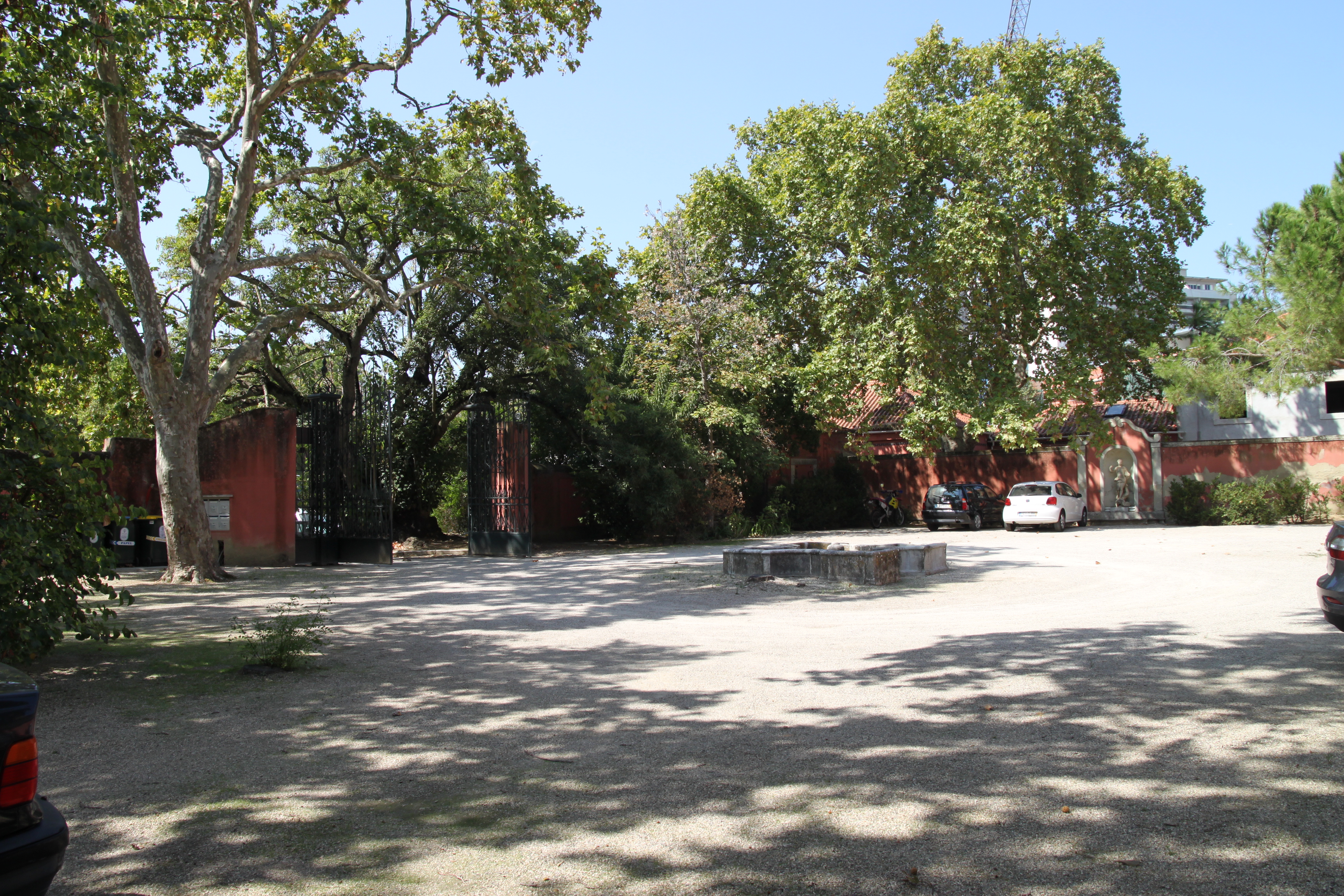
The interior courtyard, including rose walls and central fountain

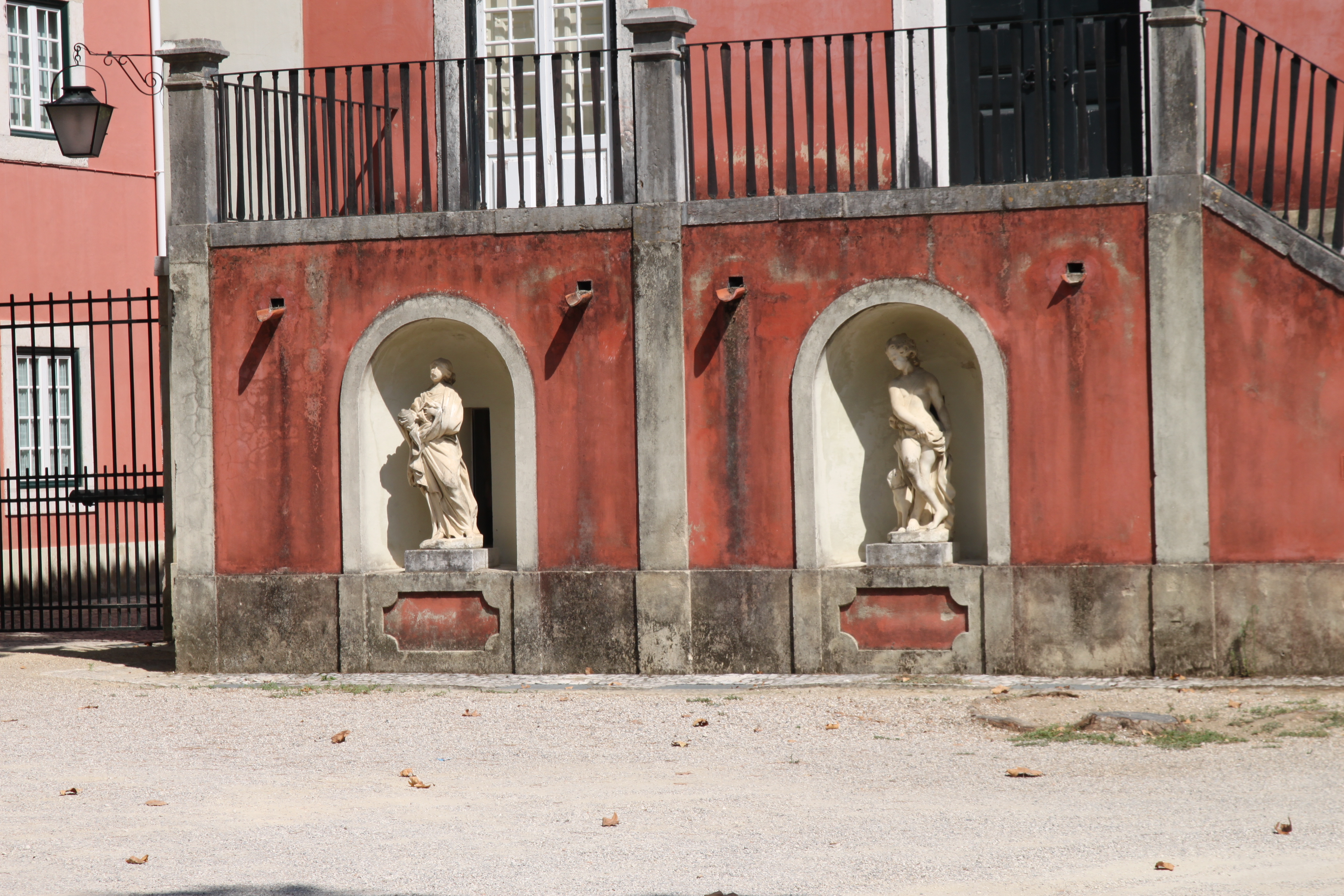
The double niche on the staircase with the sculptures, dating to the 18th century

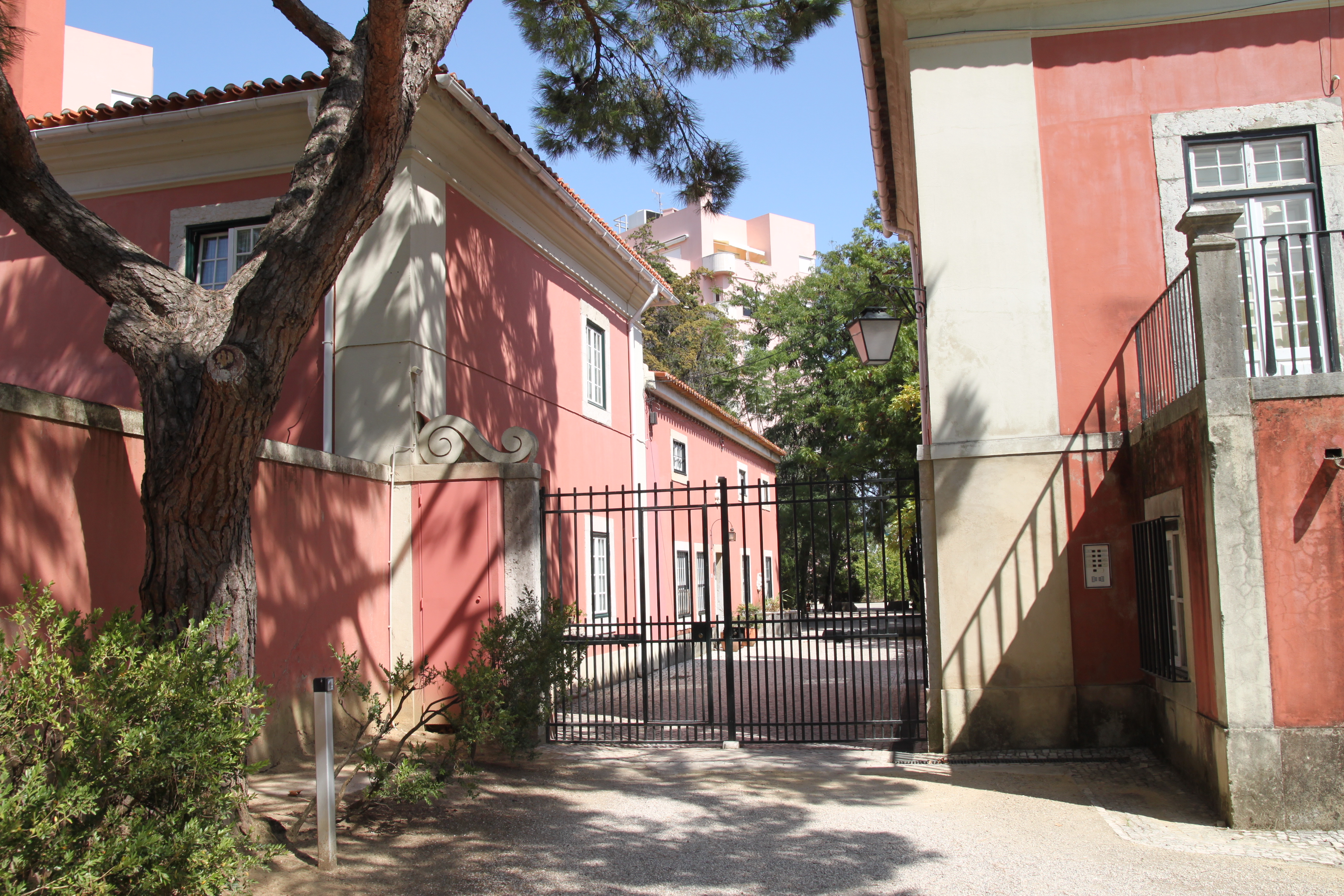
Access to the private quarters

References to the estate extend to the 13th and 14th century; in 1384, vineyards and lagares in the possession of the King were already established, donated to Afonso Pires da Charneca (supporter of King John I and colleague of Nuno Álvares Pereira and his wife D. Constanca Esteves. The estate was inherited by Afonso's brother, Martim Afonso da Charneca, counsel of King John and later Archbishop of Braga and Bishop of Coimbra on 11 December 1392. The rich fertile lands continued in the hands of peoples who were in service of the King.

Eventually, the estate's lands were confiscated by the Bishop of Guarda D. Afonso Correia (1367–1384) who supported Castille, including possessions given by King John on 24 August 1385 to the bishop, in addition to awards granted to his brother Afonso Pires da Charneca (for his efforts against the Castilians, but who had died and left no heirs).

Among these possessions included in this estate were "the vineyards and its lagares that circled Lisbon, from the roads to Charneca and Sacavém". This is, all the terrains, that included approximately 40 hectares, today occupying the road from Sacavém to Amoreiras, passing through the parishes of São João de Deus, terminating in the north at Azinhaga da Feiteira (Charneca) and whose southerly limit along the Rua Actriz Virgínia, in Alto do Pina.

When in Bologna, when friend to João das Regras, D. Martinho had a daughter with the noblewoman D. Maria de Miranda, who eventually married Gonçalo Pereira, from Cabeceiras de Basto, master of the Couto of Lumiares. In virtue of this wedding on 29 June 1413, Archbishop D. Martinho gifted the couple the vineyards and lagars. The couple had one son, Rui Vaz Pereira, to whom the couple (on 23 April 1440) in the home of Sancho de Noronha in Chaves, gifted the vineyards and lagares of El-Rei for his wedding. With the good grace of the King, the lands continued to be held by servants of the Crown. Therefore, in the donation of the vineyards and lagares of El'Rei, clauses stipulated that the successors and heirs maintain agricultural conditions, and that the eldest capable heir would maintain the tradition of service.

After the marriage of Rui Vaz Pereira with D. Beatriz de Noronha, daughter of Afonso Henriques, Count of Gijón e Noronha, they had four daughters: D. Isabel (later Duchess of the Infantado de Castela), D. Beatriz (Senhora de Norou), D. Maria (who was Countess Montorio in the Kingdom of Napeles) and D. Constança, the eldest, who was Countess of Avranches in Lower Normandy (following her marriage to the second Count of Avranches, D. Fernando de Almada, captain-major of the Kingdom of Portugal. It was D. Constanca that became the master of Lagares de El-Rei, and the estate was integrated into the possessions of the House of Almada, the Counts of Almada.

In the intervening years, though, the vineyards were abandoned and wine production ceased. The lands were then carved-up throughout the 17th century; in 1675, D. Lourenço de Almada (first Count of Almada) was authorized by the Prince Regent D. Pedro to demolition some the lagares at the time in order to expand the main hall, annexes, oratory and small theatre. Owing to having the most fertile lands in Lisbon, the de-annexed parcels were cultivated to support the markets of the capital, including the Quinta da Montanha.

At the beginning of the 20th century, the estate was rented to various tenants, including painter Carlos Reis. It was D. Lourenço Vaz de Almada, the property-owner and Count of Avranches, who as engineer by training, remodeled the exterior and renovated the interiors, taking the decision to install himself and family at the estate permanently. After a period of tenant farming, the Almada family recuperated the property in 1936, after new remodeling. Even so, in 1946, the municipal council of Lisbon, expropriated some terrains to construct new school and urban development, and another section was donated to the Patriarchy of Lisbon in order to build the Church of Santa Joana Princesa. In 1974, the manor was divided into various independent residences.

Today the Quinta dos Lagares d´El-Rei, by decree 26 February 1982 the estate was classified as a Property of Public Interest (Imóvel de Interesse Público) In October 1998, a risk assessment for the property was elaborated by the DGEMN.

The Church of Santa Joana Princesa, consecrated on 30 May 2002 (with the creation of the ecclesiastical parish on 25 March 1959), was installed on terrains that were part of the estate. This flowed from a promise made by the Counts of Almada, specifically Lourenço Vaz de Almada and his spouse Helena da Câmara Viterbo, for Portugal not entering the Second World War. Their proposal was presented to Cardinal Manuel Gonçalves Cerejeira, initially for the construction of a chapel dedicated to Santa Joana Princesa, owing to the long history of this devotion in the Almada family. The plans were expanded to a church, cultural centre, funerary chapels and pastoral centre. The estate continues to be held as a possession of the Almada family.

== Architecture ==
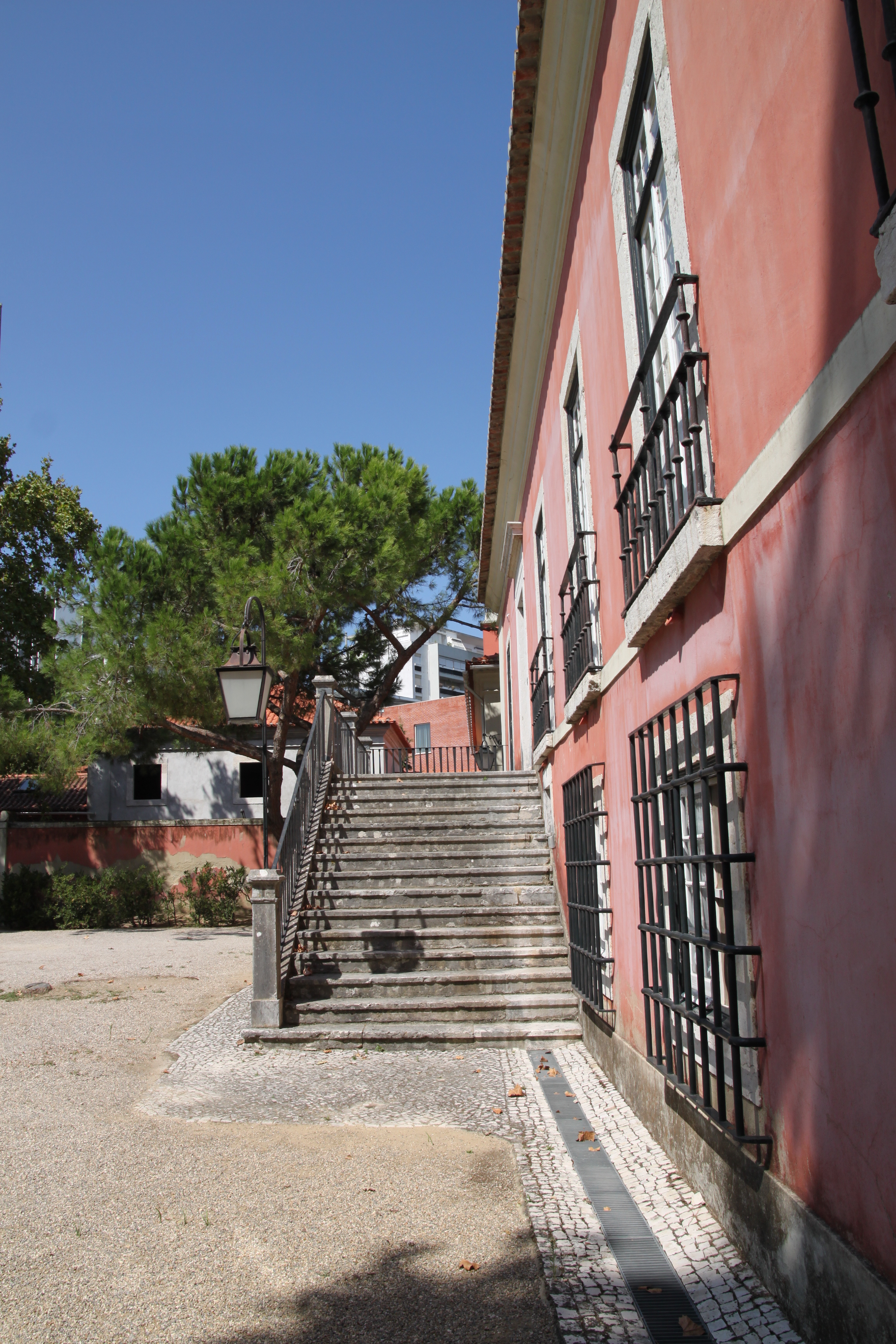
Access to the second-floor landing and entranceway of the main building.

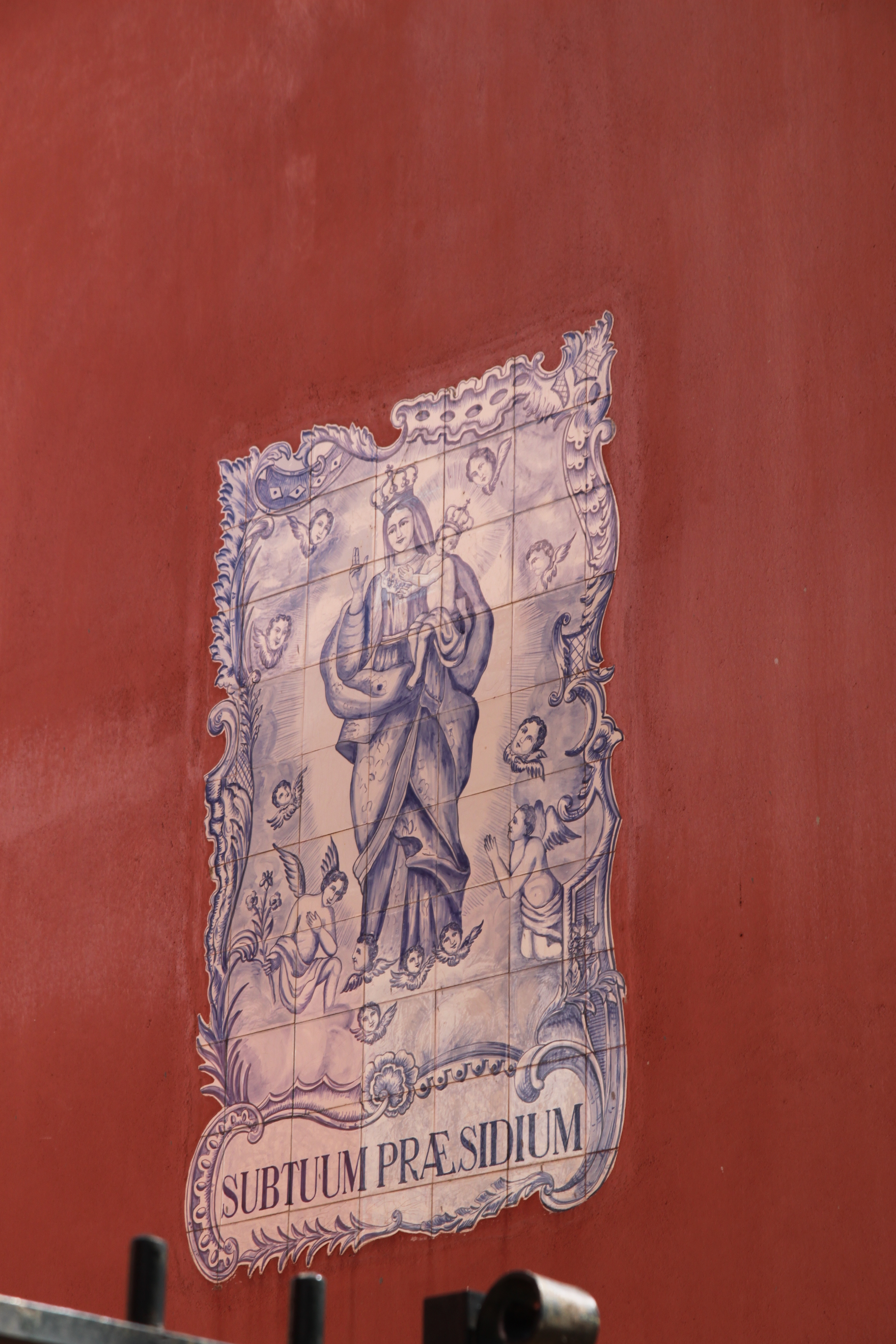
An azulejo tile of Santa Joana Princesa, the estates patron saint

The estate is accessible from a large iron gate open to a dirt courtyard, surrounded by landscaped garden and woodlot. In the centre of this courtyard is a fountain, moved from the Palace of the Counts of Almada, in Rossio.

There are some annexes and guesthouses that are older on this property. The main estate consists of a two-story building with two wings. The facade is marked by a sculpted relief of the coat-of-arms of the Almada family, located between two large windows on the second floor. Access to the main floor is made by staircase and landing, with two rounded niches in simple stone, with mythical sculpture from the 18th century. A statute, two pools, a bust and other sculptures are dispersed throughout the garden, arriving from other properties owned by the Almada family.

The interior of the palace includes a large possessions of an artistic quality, with paintings by Carlos Reis, an oratory with presbytery decorated in trompe-l'oeil and a 16th-century representation of Martírio de São Lourenço, in addition to a mark used to delimit the property.

The estates annexes include horse-stables, wine-cellars, hayloft, kiln and other buildings. The estate includes some of the more fertile lands in the region of Lisbon, including the Quinta da Montanha, whose products are sold in the capital's markets.
