= Border River =

1954 film by George Sherman

- Film poster
- Directed by: George Sherman
- Screenplay by: William Sackheim; Louis Stevens
- Story by: Louis Stevens
- Produced by: Albert J. Cohen
- Starring: Joel McCrea; Yvonne De Carlo; Pedro Armendariz
- Cinematography: Irving Glassberg
- Edited by: Frank Gross
- Color process: Technicolor
- Production company: Universal International Pictures
- Distributed by: Universal International Pictures
- Release date: January 1954
- Running time: 81 minutes
- Country: United States
- Language: English
- Box office: $1 million

Border River is a 1954 American Western film directed by George Sherman and starring Joel McCrea, Yvonne De Carlo and Pedro Armendariz.

== Plot ==
During the US Civil War, Clete Mattson arrives in Zona Libre, a small territory across the river from the United States. Ruled by ruthless General Calleja, it offers sanctuary to outlaws. Mattson wants to buy guns for the Confederacy, using gold stolen from the Union.

== Cast ==
- Joel McCrea as Clete Mattson
- Yvonne De Carlo as Carmelita Carias
- Pedro Armendariz as General Calleja
- Alfonso Bedoya as Captain Vargas
- Howard Petrie as Newlund
- Erika Nordin as Annina Strasser
- George J. Lewis as Sanchez
- Nacho Galindo as Lopez
- Ivan Triesault as Baron Von Hollden
- George Wallace as Fletcher
- Lane Chandler as Anderson
- Martin Garralaga as Guzman
- Joe Bassett as Stanton
- Salvador Baguez as General Robles
- Felipe Turich as Pablo

== Production ==
Joel McCrea and Yvonne De Carlo's casting was announced in April 1953. George Sherman was assigned to direct.

Filming began on 3 June 1953, the same day as Universal's The Glenn Miller Story. The two films were the first movies made at Universal for four weeks.

Parts of the film were shot in Colorado River, Professor Valley, and Courthouse Wash in Utah.

== Release ==
=== Home media ===
Kino Lorber released a region A Blu-ray edition of the film through their Kino Lorber Studio Classics label on March 28, 2023.
