= Dinis Gregório de Melo Castro e Mendonça =

Portuguese colonial administrator

2nd Captain-General of the Azores
- In office 21 April 1776 – 3 December 1793
- Monarchs: Joseph; Maria I
- Prime Minister: Sebastião José de Carvalho e Melo; Aires de Sá e Melo
- Succeeded by: Bishop José da Avé-Maria Leite da Costa e Silva
- Constituency: Azores

Personal details
- Born: Dinis Gregório de Melo Castro e Mendonça; 11 April 1735 Lisbon
- Died: 3 December 1793 (aged 58) Angra do Heroísmo
- Resting place: Convent of São Francisco
- Citizenship: Kingdom of Portugal
- Spouse: Maria Rosa de Ataíde e Cunha
- Children: António Manuel de Melo e Castro de Mendonça
- Occupation: Governor General

Dinis Gregório de Melo Castro e Mendonça (Lisbon, 11 April 1735 — Angra, 3 December 1793) was a member of high nobility, military and Portuguese colonial administrator, who exercised the role as the Captain-General of the Azores (1771-1793).

== Biography ==
Noble in the King's Council, Castro e Mendonça was the last governor of the fortress of Mazagão, and served in this post since 1763, under constant fire from enemy forces, until the fortification was abandoned in 1769.

=== Captaincy-General of the Azores ===
Dinis Gregório was the second Captain-General of the Azores, nominated to the position on 18 October 1771, but only arrived in Angra on 15 April 1776. He took office on 21 April 1776.

An overall assessment of his performance as the Azores' Captain-General indicates that his mandate was dominated by issues of counterfeiting. This situation continued, perhaps with greater intensity and even complicity of more figures in his administration, subsequent to his death. Documents from his period, as governor of the archipelago, point to negligence on the part of administrative affairs, a fact that became contentious during the interim government (1793-1799). Yet, it should not be neglected that the collection and management of income taxes, had an important impact on and originated many of the reform measures enacted in the transition from the 18th to 19th centuries, under the Count of Almada (appointed in 1799).

Mendonça tried to develop agriculture in Terceira (where he resided) and promoted construction in the capital. In São Miguel, the municipal council united the estates-general (clergy, nobility and people) in order to debilitate the currency issue, by authorizing false currency to impede Spanish counterfeits. It was at the time that the nascent orange industry began to take root: many of the gentleman-farmers started cultivating orchards of citrus fruit for export. This burgeoning export market also included the harvest of corn and seeding of terrains with flax and hemp plants.

At the time of his death (3 December 1793), he was a man of great stature and imposing character, who lived in the Castle of Angra. He died in Angra and was buried in his adopted home, in the Church of Nossa Senhora da Guia, the Convent of São Francisco. His family remained resident in Angra, until the reign of Maria II, when they returned to Lisbon, by Royal order and at the cost of their public honorary.

== Descendants ==
Dinis Gregório was the father of António Manuel de Melo e Castro de Mendonça who was the leader of the government of São Paulo, in the Portuguese colony of Brazil (after 28 June 1797) and Governor General of Portuguese Mozambique, between 14 August 1809 and August 1812.
