= João Luís Graça Zagallo Vieira da Silva =

Portuguese veterinarian and politician

João Luís Graça Zagallo Vieira da Silva (24 September 1916 – Portel, May 10, 1979), was a veterinarian and Portuguese politician during the period of the Estado Novo.

== Early life ==
He was born in Estremoz in 1916, the son of João Lopes Nunes Vieira da Silva and Elisa Carmen Reynolds Graça Zagallo. He studied to become a veterinarian at the Technical University of Lisbon. He worked as a veterinarian at the Directorate General of Livestock Services.

== Political career ==
Vieira da Silva was active in the politics of Evora, serving at different times as a councillor, deputy mayor, and mayor of the town, as well as being a member of the Évora District Commission for the National Union, and President of the Administrative Commission of the Federation of Municipalities of the District of Évora.

He was the Prosecutor to the Corporate Chamber during the VIII Legislature from 1961–1965, in the "Local Authorities" section. He then served as Civil Governor of Beja District from 9 October 1968 to 25 November 1972, and of Évora District from 25 November 1972 to 25 April 1974).

He was also a collaborator of Fundação Eugénio de Almeida and of the Patrocínio Hospital.

== Personal life ==
He married Maria Violeta de Castro Gião Carneiro, with whom he had three children: José Maria Carneiro Vieira da Silva, Elisa Carmen Carneiro Vieira da Silva and Maria de Lurdes Carneiro Vieira da Silva.

== Legacy ==
A street is named after Vieira da Silva in Évora, in the parish of Malagueira.
