= Évora (São Mamede, Sé, São Pedro e Santo Antão) =

- Civil parish
- Location in Portugal
- Coordinates: 38.571°N 7.913°W
- Country: Portugal
- Region: Alentejo
- Intermunic. comm.: Alentejo Central
- District: Évora
- Municipality: Évora

Area
  - Total: 1.13 km^{2} (0.44 sq mi)

Population (2011)
  - Total: 4,738
  - Density: 4,200/km^{2} (11,000/sq mi)
- Time zone: UTC+00:00 (WET)
  - Summer (DST): UTC+01:00 (WEST)

Évora (São Mamede, Sé, São Pedro e Santo Antão) is a civil parish in the municipality of Évora, Portugal. It was formed in 2013 by the merger of the former parishes São Mamede, Sé e São Pedro and Santo Antão. The population in 2011 was 4,738, in an area of 1.13 km^{2}.

== Main sites ==
- Santo Antão Church
- Giraldo Square
- Garcia de Resende Theatre
