= Zona Libre =

The Zona Libre, or Free Zone, was a free trade zone in the Mexican state of Tamaulipas along the Mexico–United States border established in 1858. The goal of Zona Libre was to equalize the imbalanced economic environments that had resulted after the Mexican–American War on either side of the Rio Grande River, which had become the international border between the United States and Mexico under the Treaty of Guadalupe-Hidalgo. In January 1885, roughly three decades after the Zona Libre was established, the Mexican government extended the free trade zone along the entire US-Mexican border, which created a zone approximately a thousand miles long and six miles wide.

== Mexican–American War ==
The duration of the Mexican–American War was from 1846–1848 During the war, the economy of the US-Mexican border towns had boomed as merchants' profits inflated while supplying the armed forces of both sides. War proved to be a profitable industry as the border towns swelled in size and in economy. In the decade previous to the war, border towns had actually shrunk in size, such as the town of Matamoros, which had been the largest of the border towns at 17,000, and by 1846 had dwindled to 7,000 inhabitants with only poorer prospects. However, with the coming of American troops, new life was breathed into the towns as an opportunity for commerce showed itself.

== Establishment ==
Once the Mexican–American War had ended and the Treaty of Guadalupe Hidalgo was approved, Mexico reinstated a preexisting system of tariffs which angered merchants who planned to stay in the previously profitable region of Mexico and conduct business. The tariff caused goods to be so expensive they often could not be sold. In addition, the laws governing tariffs were changed frequently and often without reason, resulting in frustration among merchants and distrust among importers. Even worse, merchants grew more and more frustrated as they watched towns spring up and prosper on the American side of the border just opposite theirs, where business flourished without the high costs of the Mexican tariff system. In their book The Zona Libre, Samuel E. Bell and James M. Smallwood argue that after the Treaty of Guadalupe-Hidalgo, many American border towns prospered at the expense of Mexican villages. Because goods were so much cheaper in the American towns, Mexicans would cross the border to purchase goods and then smuggle them back home across the Rio Grande. Merchants and other larger-scale buyers also profited a great deal from this illicit smuggling, resulting in American towns that thrived on illegal operations, along with tense relationships among the towns north of the border in Texas and south of the border in Tamaulipas. These poor economic conditions also contributed to increased emigration from Mexico to the US. To counteract emigration, the Mexican government passed a law in the spring of 1849 to slightly decrease the rates of which provisions could be imported. However, the law was not comprehensive enough and failed to curb emigration. In the next ten years, merchants would continue to find ways around the Mexican tariff system and the Mexican side of the US-Mexican border would relentlessly deteriorate.

In 1857, politics changed dramatically in Mexico. The new Mexican President, Ignacio Comonfort, elected under the Mexican Constitution of 1857, effectively dissolved the Mexican Congress and dismissed the Constitution. In response, several frightened Mexican states, including the state of Tamaulipas, granted incredible powers to their governors. Finally, in 1858, the ad interim Governor of Tamaulipas, Ramón Guerra, established the Zona Libre by special decree in an attempt to grow the economic prowess of his state at the petitioned request of his citizens. Under this decree, goods remained duty-free so long as they stayed within the boundaries of the free trade zone, loosely outlined by Guerra. Unlike the United States, however, goods could be stored in private or public warehouses indefinitely, giving Mexican merchants an edge over the American ones who were restricted to only two years by United States law.

== Expansion ==
In April 1884, Consul-General Warner P. Sutton alerted the United States Department of State through telegraph that the Zona Libre was being extended from the state of Tamaulipas to the Pacific Ocean, across the entire northern part of Mexico. This vote in the Mexican federal congress occurred despite numerous fears that the trade territory of Mexico would become obsolete due to the growing railroad industry and increased immigration to the United States. However, the expansion of Zona Libre did have positive effects on the towns within the zone, although the effects demonstrated to be fairly small.

== United States reaction ==
The establishment of the original Zona Libre of 1858 caused mixed reactions in America. Most Americans merchants viewed the free trade zone in a positive manner as an opportunity to make money, and moved across the border to do just that. One American, Richard Fitzpatrick, the new U.S. consul at Matamoros (a city within Tamaulipas), however, voiced his concerns over smuggling within Zona Libre, explaining the process thusly:

The traders and merchants evade the law in this way: they open the foreign goods and take out a part – sometimes the whole – of the foreign manufactured goods, then fill up the boxes or packages with other goods, and then send them to the Mexican side of the river and get the [signature] of two Mexicans, and with that they cancel their bonds in the custom house of Point Isabel, Texas. But this is not all. Sometimes they send the goods in whole packages across into Mexico and there break them, get signatures to cancel their bonds and carry the goods back to Texas and sell them there or wherever they please. In this way they can undersell the fair trader in any market in the United States.

Over the next thirty years, many Americans came to agree with Fitzpatrick, their anti-Zona Libre sentiment filling the newspapers, with such headlines as "The Zona Libre and its Abuses—A Paradise of Smugglers", “A Trading Grievance” or sub-headlines such as "It Has Had a Semi-Legal Existence—Place of Refuge for Smugglers and Revolutionaries".

== Abolishment ==
Zona Libre began to carry high costs for the Mexican government in the late 1880s. Anti-Zona Libre sentiment within the United States began to show itself in the American Congress and within American border towns, affecting U.S.-Mexican relations and threatening trade among the two nations. The United States began efforts to suspend border routes and hamper trade in order to pressure Mexico to abolish the free trade zone. In response, rather than abolishing the zone, Mexico restricted the zone in 1891 by increasing the levy on imports from 3% to 10%. In 1895 the United States Congress suspended all bonded routes from the U.S. to Zona Libre. However, this suspension was entirely ineffective, as Mexican railroads simply circumvented the suspended routes. While United States pressure failed to result in any change in regards to Zona Libre, a small group of businessmen were able to start a movement to abolish the free trade zone, arguing that when Zona Libre was established, there had been no railroads, or even Telegraphic communications across the border, which was no longer true in the 1890s. In addition, a requirement to pay full tariffs on goods manufactured within Zona Libre resulted in a lack of industry in the region, which stunted growth—ironically, while the free zone was excellent for trade, heavy restrictions made it impossible for manufacturing, which resulted in few jobs. By abolishing Zona Libre, the hope was that the region could begin to prosper and grow once more. Finally, in July 1905 after over a decade of movements against Zona Libre, Mexican President Díaz executively abolished the free trade zone. Díaz cited his actions on the reasoning that the expansion of the railroad system and increased communications across the border no longer necessitated a free trade zone. Although some feared the abolishment of Zona Libre would prove negative for the region, Consul Lewis A. Martin of Piedras Negras reported positive news in 1906:

When the Free Zone was abolished in June, July, 1905, it was feared that the abolition would have a tendency materially to lessen the volume of trade conducted through this port. On the contrary, the trade has very materially increased—both imports and exports. The business prospects in the district were never more encouraging or the various industries more active, and there never was a time when the customs officials were handling more revenues from the ports and exports.
