= Count of Almada =

Portuguese title of nobility from the 18th century

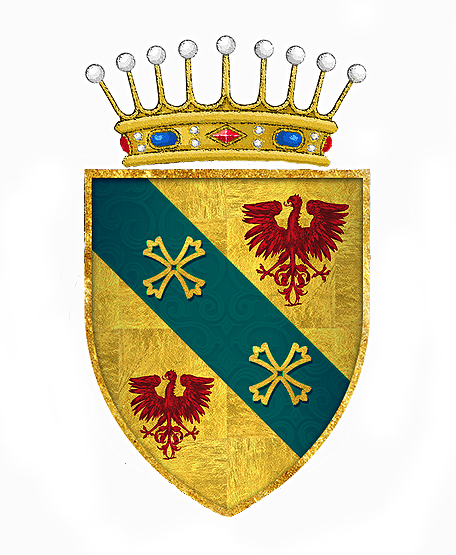
Coat-of-arms of the Count of Almada and Abrantes

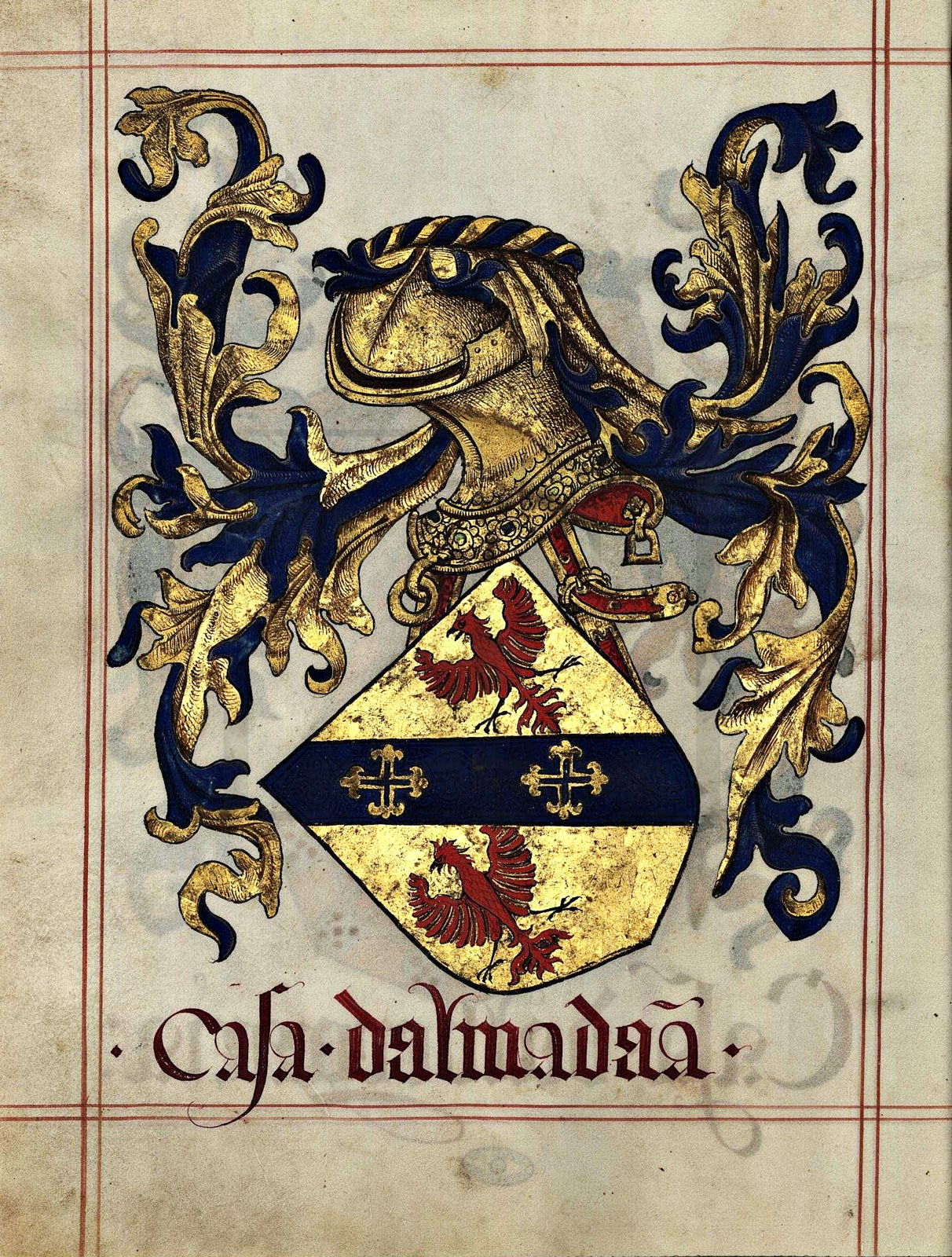
Family coat-of-arms

The Count of Almada is a noble title created by Queen Maria I of Portugal, by royal proclamation on 29 April 1793 (confirmed by letter on 4 May 1793), in favour of D. Lourenço José Boaventura de Almada and his descendants, representatives of the Count of Avranches.

By attributing this title the option to provide an ancillary surname to the Almada family, but the monarch wanted to provide honours to this family for their illustrious service.

== Counts of Almada ==
- Lourenço José Boaventura de Almada, 1st Count of Almada
- Antão José Maria de Almada, 2nd Count of Almada;
- Lourenço José Maria Boaventura de Almada de Abreu Pereira Cirne Peixoto, 3rd Count of Almada.

With the institutionalization of the Liberal system, the family (who opposed the constitutional monarchy) continued as pretenders to the title:

- Miguel Vaz de Almada (1859–1916)
- Luís Vaz de Almada (1863–1919)

After the establishment of the first Portuguese Republican and abolish of the monarchy, the title of Count of Almada was abolished, although some continue to act as caretakers to a possible restoration:

- Lourenço de Jesus Maria José Vaz de Almada, 4th Count of Almada
- Luís Francisco de Almada, 5th Count of Almada
- Lourenço José de Almada, Count of Almada

== See also ==
- Count of Avranches
