= Casa de Sá =

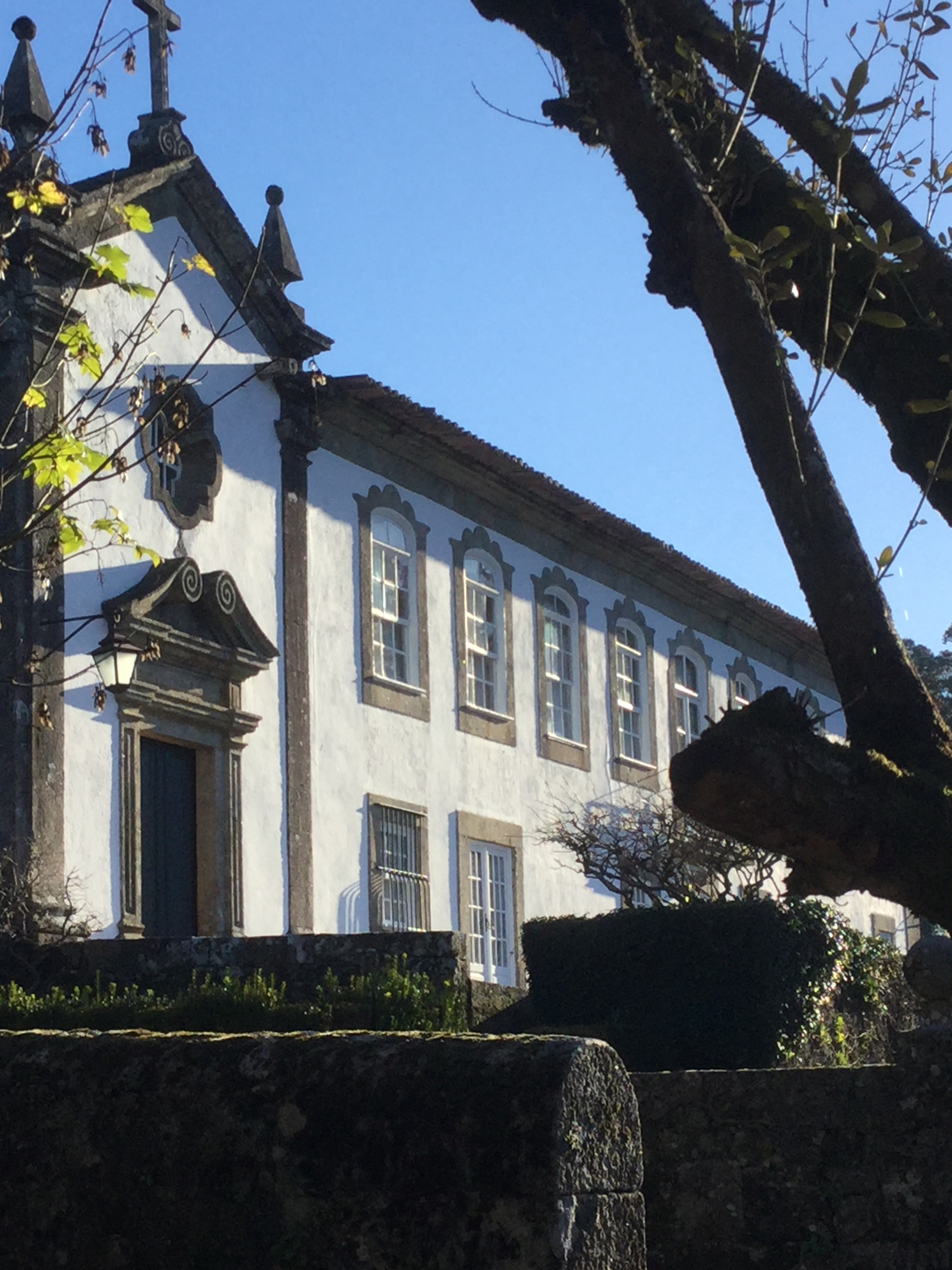
- Casa de Sá, chapel and part of South facade
- Interactive map of the Casa de Sá area

General information
- Type: Manor house (Solar)
- Architectural style: Northern Portuguese manorial
- Location: Sá, Ponte de Lima, Portugal
- Coordinates: 41°46′25.7″N 8°37′1.8″W
- Opened: c. 1698-1750
- Owner: Private|Private

Technical details
- Material: Granite

Casa de Sá (historically Casa Grande de Sá or alternatively Casa da Lage) is a historic manor house and agricultural estate in the Municipality of Ponte de Lima, Portugal. It is registered as a historic property of public interest by the Portuguese Government’s IGESPAR institute.

In its current form, the principal building dates from the 17th and 18th centuries, and is typical of the Northern Portuguese seigneurial architecture of the period. The estate contains a chapel, consecrated in 1739 and dedicated to the Immaculate Conception, with a large baroque wood-carved retable; an integrally preserved 18th-century winery and granary, and terraced landscape gardens of 19th-century Romantic design.

It was the birthplace of António de Araújo e Azevedo, 1st Count of Barca, one of the foremost Portuguese political figures of his time.

== History ==
The property and original manor house, of which nothing remains, were in the possession of the Pereira Pinto family since at least 1500. Their ancestors had initially contracted a lease on the land from the abbots of the benedictine monastery of Saint Cosmas in Ázere, Arcos de Valdevez, but eventually came to own it. In 1708, the marriage of heiress Violante Pereira Pinto to jurisconsult Tristão de Araújo de Azevedo brought it into the possession of the Araújo family, formerly Lords of Lobios, who had fled to Minho from Galicia after killing a certain Lopo Soares, majordomo of the Bishop of Ourense. 1711 marked the beginning of the works that were to lend the house its present shape.

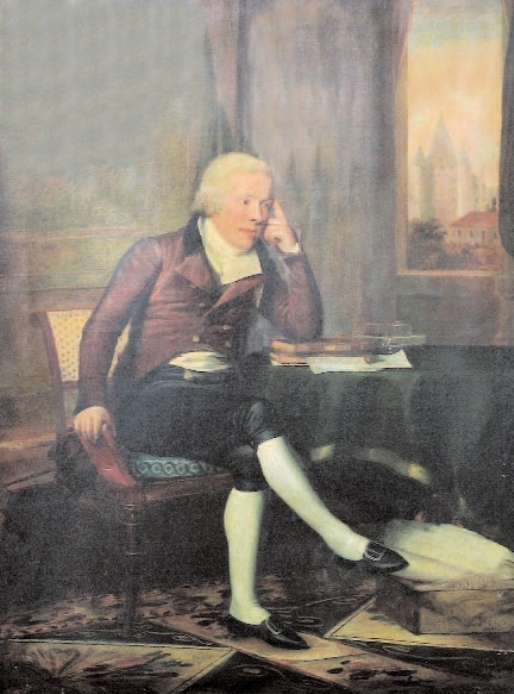
António de Araújo e Azevedo, 1st Count of Barca, portrayed by Domenico Pellegrini (painting in the collections of the Portuguese Ministry of Foreign Affairs, Lisbon).

Between then and the Liberal reforms of the early 19th century, the estate was transmitted according to the rules of primogeniture as a majorat.

António de Araújo e Azevedo, prime-minister of Portugal under King John VI and a key figure in the last decades of the colonial history of Brazil, was born in the house in 1754, the eldest of ten siblings. Although he inherited the estate at a young age, his political and diplomatic career would take him to The Hague, St. Petersburg, Paris (where he was briefly incarcerated in the Bastille) and finally Rio de Janeiro, where he accompanied the royal household in the wake of the Napoleonic invasion of Portugal.

His brother Brigadier Francisco António de Araújo e Azevedo, also born in the house in 1772, was a colonial administrator, becoming 7th Captain-General of the Azores in 1816. He is famed for having led the Constitutional Revolt in Angra in the context of the Portuguese Civil War, and was killed in a counter-revolutionary coup on 3-4 April 1821. The 1st Count of Barca having died a bachelor in 1817, the house was inherited by Francisco's descendants.

Through marriage, it passed to the family of the Viscounts of Barrosa, of nearby Viana, in the early 20th century. It is presently in the possession of the Ayres de Campos family, by descent.

The house was renovated between 1909 and 1911. Plans for a new wing designed by architect José Rego Vianna in 1921 were begun but never completed.
