= Jean-Baptiste Debret =

French painter (1768–1848)

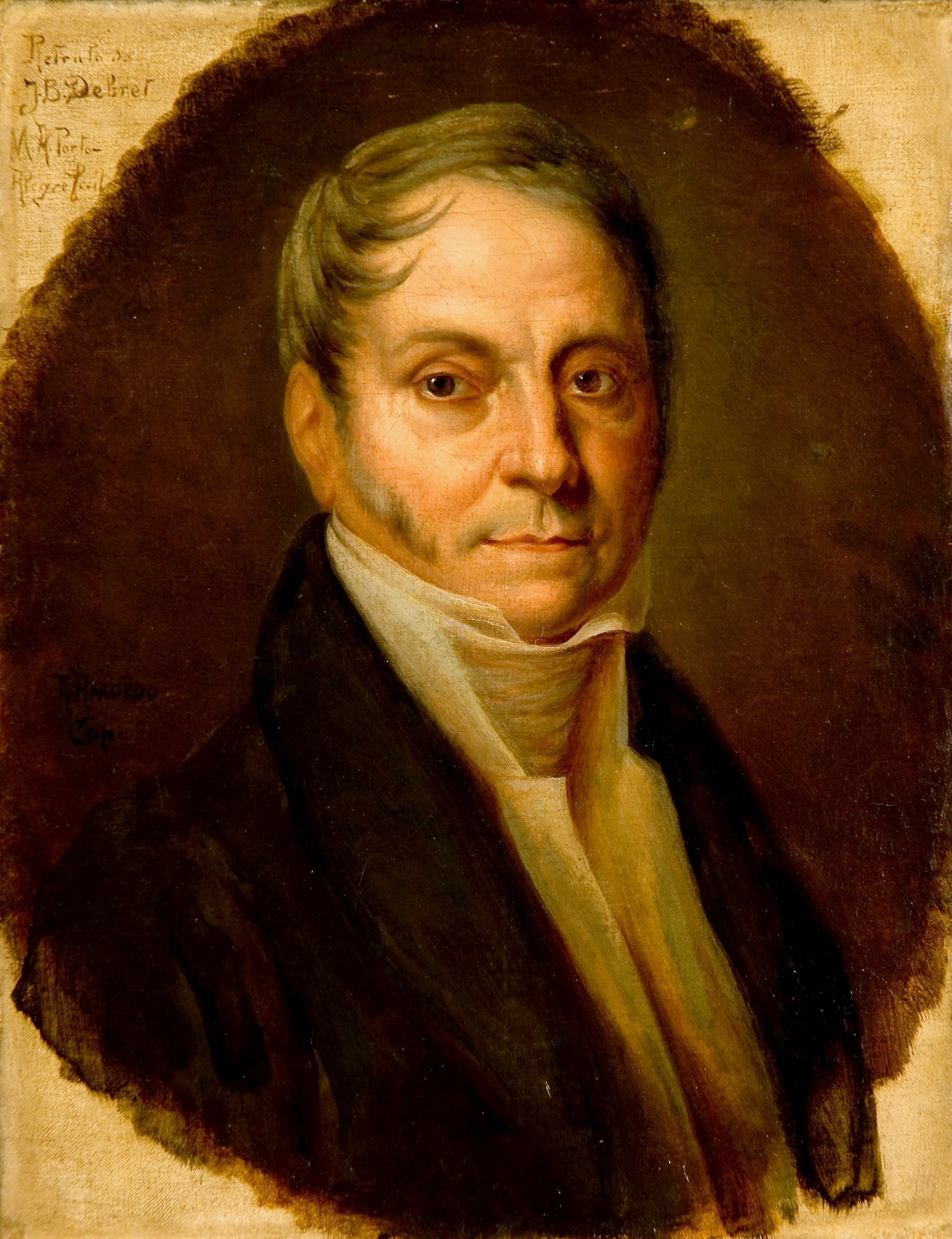
- Copy by Rodolfo Amoedo of an 1836 portrait by Manuel Porto-Alegre
- Born: 18 April 1768; Paris, Kingdom of France
- Died: 28 July 1848 (aged 80); Paris, French Second Republic
- Known for: Painting, Drawing
- Movement: Neoclassicism
- Awards: Prix de Rome; Member of the Academie des Beaux Arts.

Signature
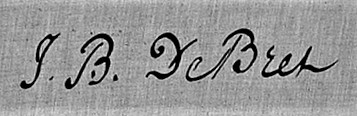

Jean-Baptiste Debret (French pronunciation: [ʒɑ̃ batist dəbʁɛ]; 18 April 1768 – 28 June 1848) was a French painter, who produced many valuable lithographs depicting the people of Brazil. Debret won the second prize at the 1798 Salon des Beaux Arts. He is the Patron of the 22nd chair of the Brazilian Academy of Fine Arts.

== Biography ==
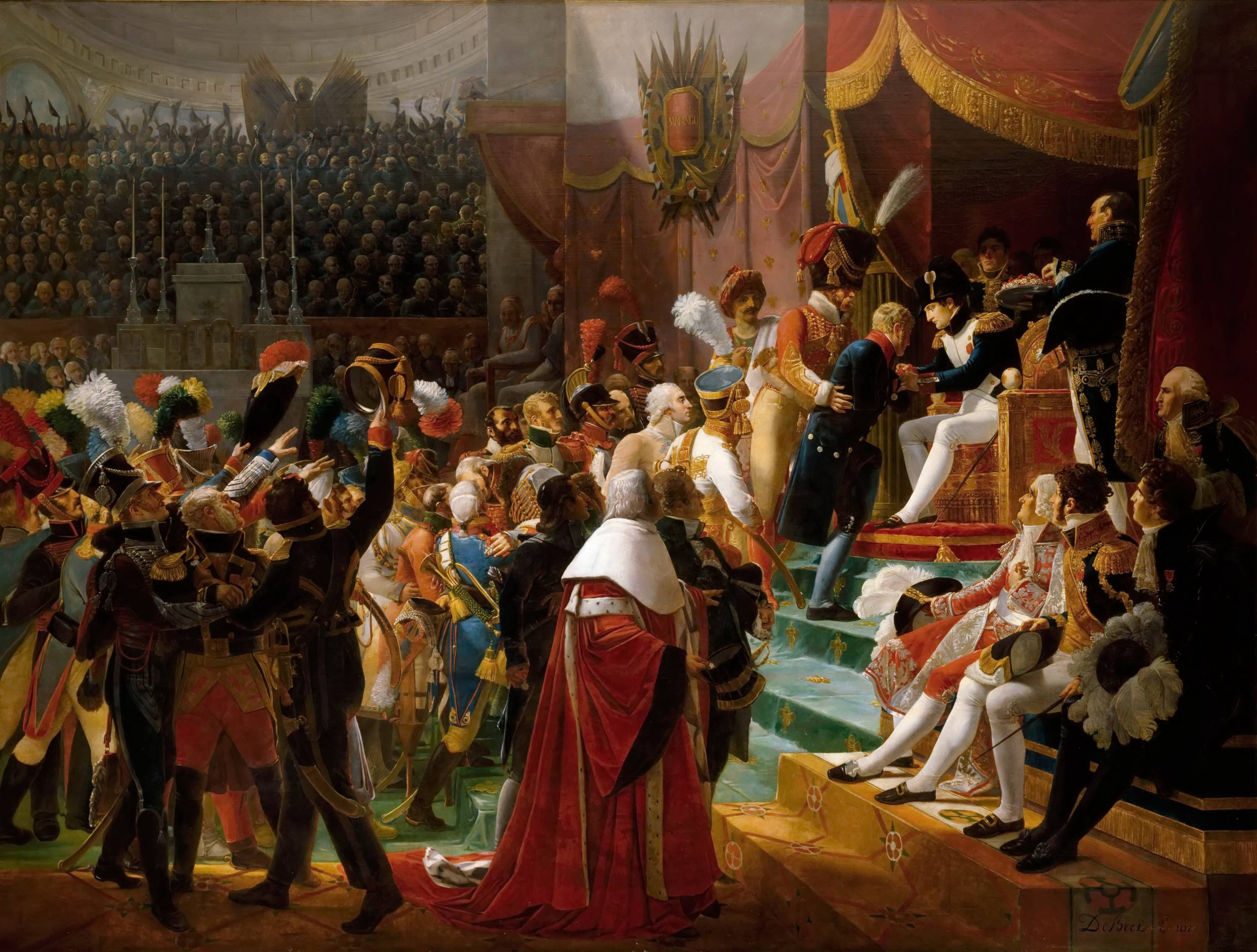
First remittance of the Légion d'Honneur, 15 July 1804, at Saint-Louis des Invalides, by Jean-Baptiste Debret, 1812

Debret studied at the French Academy of Fine Arts, a pupil of the great Jacques-Louis David (1748–1825) to whom he was related. He accompanied David to Rome in the 1780s. His debut was at the Salon des Beaux Arts of 1798, where he got the second prize.

He travelled to Brazil in March 1816 as a member of the so-called French Artistic Mission, a group of bonapartist French artists and artisans bound to creating an arts and crafts lyceum in Rio de Janeiro (Escola Real de Artes e Ofícios) under the auspices of King D. João VI and the Count of Barca. The lyceum later became the Academia Imperial de Belas Artes (Imperial Academy of Fine Arts) under Emperor Dom Pedro I.

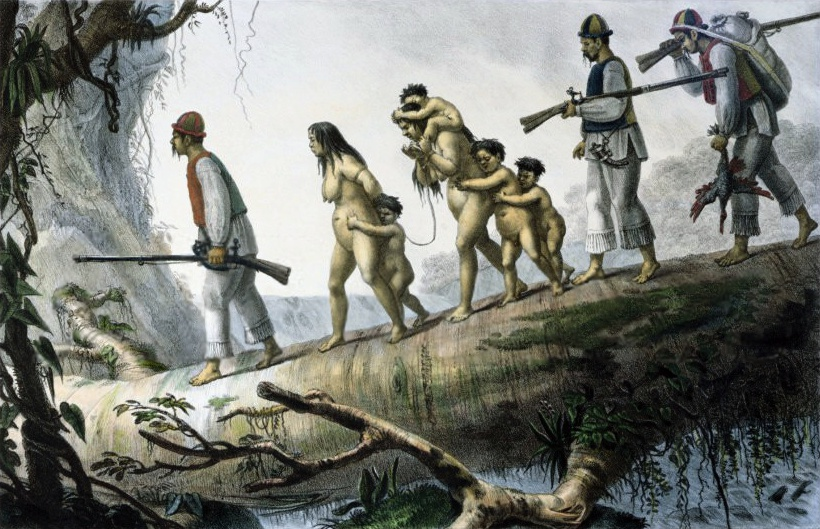
A Guarani family captured by slave hunters

As a painter favored first by the Portuguese court in exile and later by the imperial court in Rio, Debret was often commissioned to paint portraits of many of its members, such as Portuguese king Dom João VI and the Archduchess Maria Leopoldina of Austria, the first empress of Brazil, who married D. Pedro I (Debret was commissioned to produce a painting of her arrival for the marriage at the Rio port, as well as the public acclaiming of the new Emperor). He established his atelier at the Imperial Academy in December 1822 and became a valued teacher in 1826. In 1829 Debret organized the first arts exhibition ever to take place in Brazil, in which he presented many of his works as well as of his disciples. Emulating David's role during the French Empire, Debret was also involved in the drawing ornaments for many of public ceremonies and official festivities of the court and even some of the courtier's uniforms are credited to him.

He corresponded frequently with his brother in Paris. After noticing his brother's interest in his depiction of everyday life in Brazil, he started to sketch street scenes, local costumes and relations of the Brazilians in the period between 1816 and 1831. He took a particular interest in slavery of blacks and in the indigenous peoples in Brazil. Together with the German painter Johann Moritz Rugendas (1802–1858), his work is one of the most important graphic documentation of life in Brazil during the early decades of the 19th century.

Debret returned to France in 1831 and became a member of the Academie des Beaux Arts. From 1834 to 1839 he published his monumental series of three volumes of engravings, titled Voyage Pittoresque et Historique au Brésil, ou Séjour d'un Artiste Français au Brésil ("A Picturesque and Historic Voyage to Brazil, or the Sojourn of a French Artist in Brazil"). Unfortunately the work was not a commercial success. In order to survive, he made lithographs depicting paintings by his distant cousin David, but the editions were very limited and money was short. Debret died poor in Paris in 1848.

== Flag of Brazil ==
Debret was also responsible for the sketches of what would become the first flag of independent Brazil, with the collaboration of José Bonifácio. The first designs were tested in 1821, at the same time that tensions between Portugal and Brazil over the return of the court to the Portuguese metropolis were running high, and if they occurred, Brazil would be downgraded to the status of Viceroyalty. The flag of the Empire of Brazil was somewhat similar to the current one, with the following differences:

- The current blue dome under the yellow diamond with stars and a band with the words “order and progress” gave way to a green neoclassical or continental shield, and inside it a circular blue band with stars representing the provinces, the cross of the Order of Christ, and the armillary sphere above the cross. Above the neoclassical shield hung the imperial crown, symbol of the national regime, and surrounding the shield were two branches arranged like laurel, bearing coffee fruit and flowering tobacco, symbols of the country's riches.
- The size of the golden yellow diamond was significantly larger, and its points bordered the edges of the green plane of the flag.

Contrary to current beliefs, the flag's colors and designs had their own historical meanings, which were later overshadowed by the republic. These are:

- Green represents the House of Braganza, the family of Pedro I;
- Yellow refers to the House of Habsburg, the family of Leopoldina.
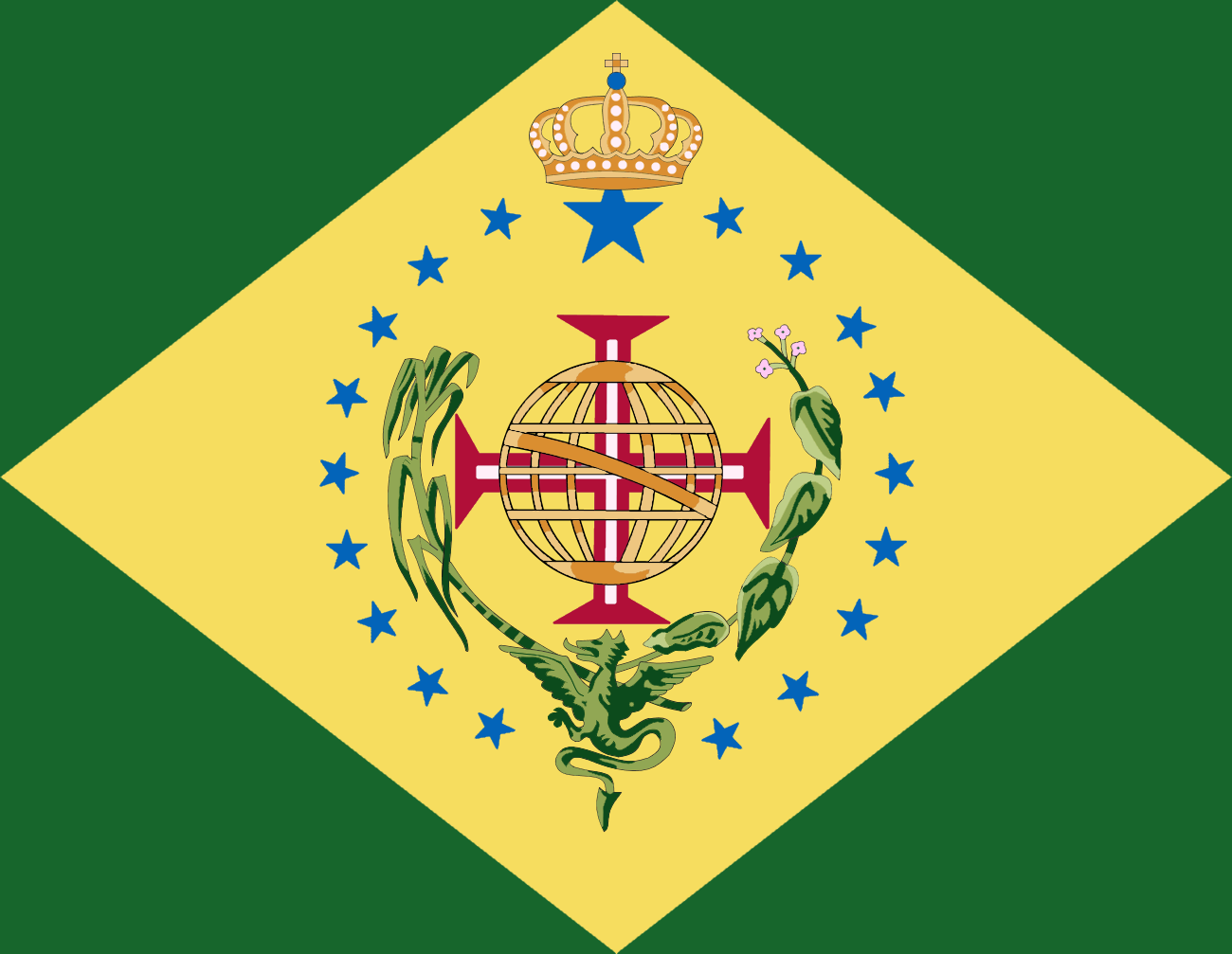
One of the first sketches of the Brazilian flag, by Jean-Baptiste Debret, circa 1820, probably designed to be the standard of the Prince Royal of the United Kingdom of Portugal, Brazil and Algarves.

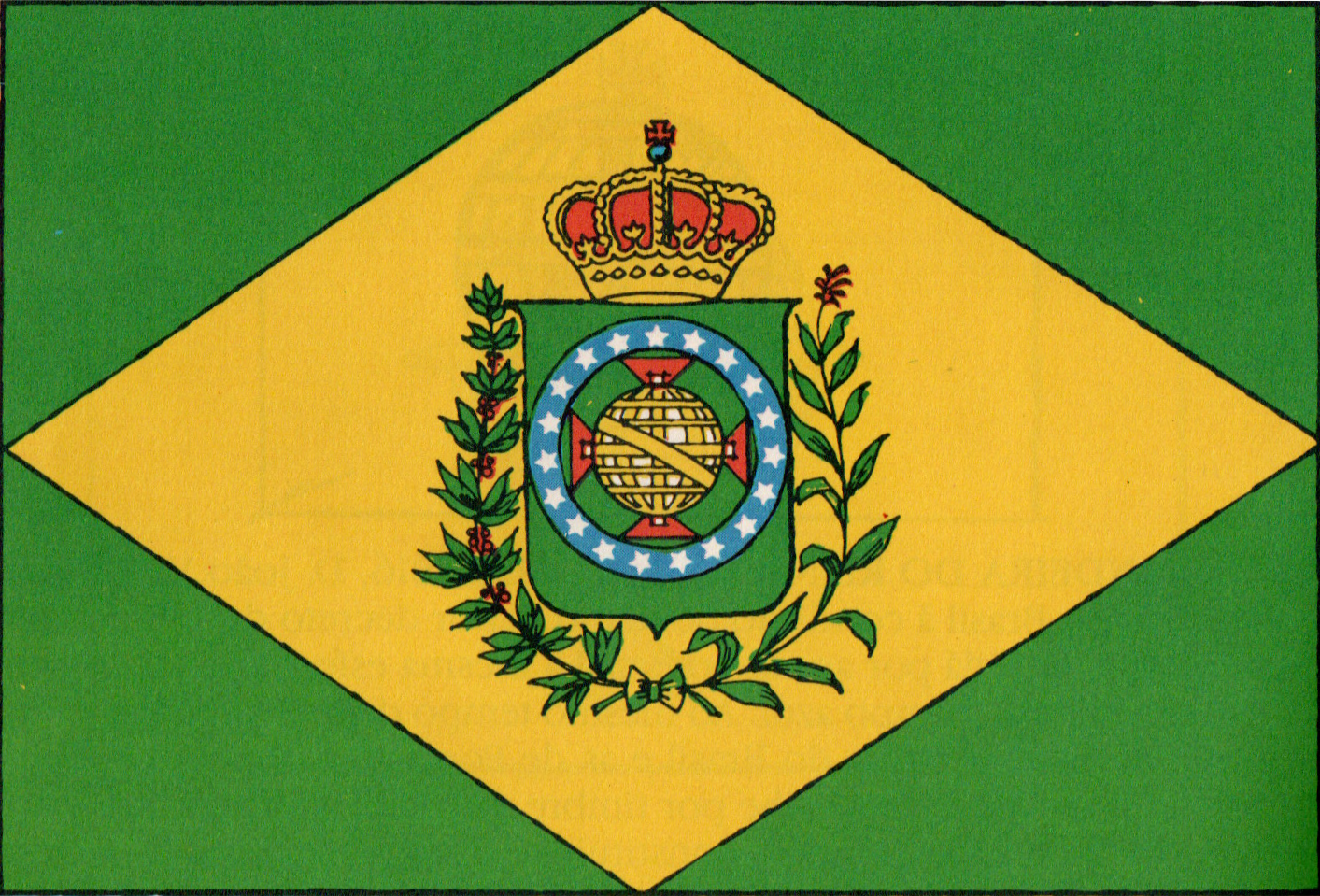
Flag of the Kingdom of Brazil (7 September to 1 December 1822)

== Gallery ==
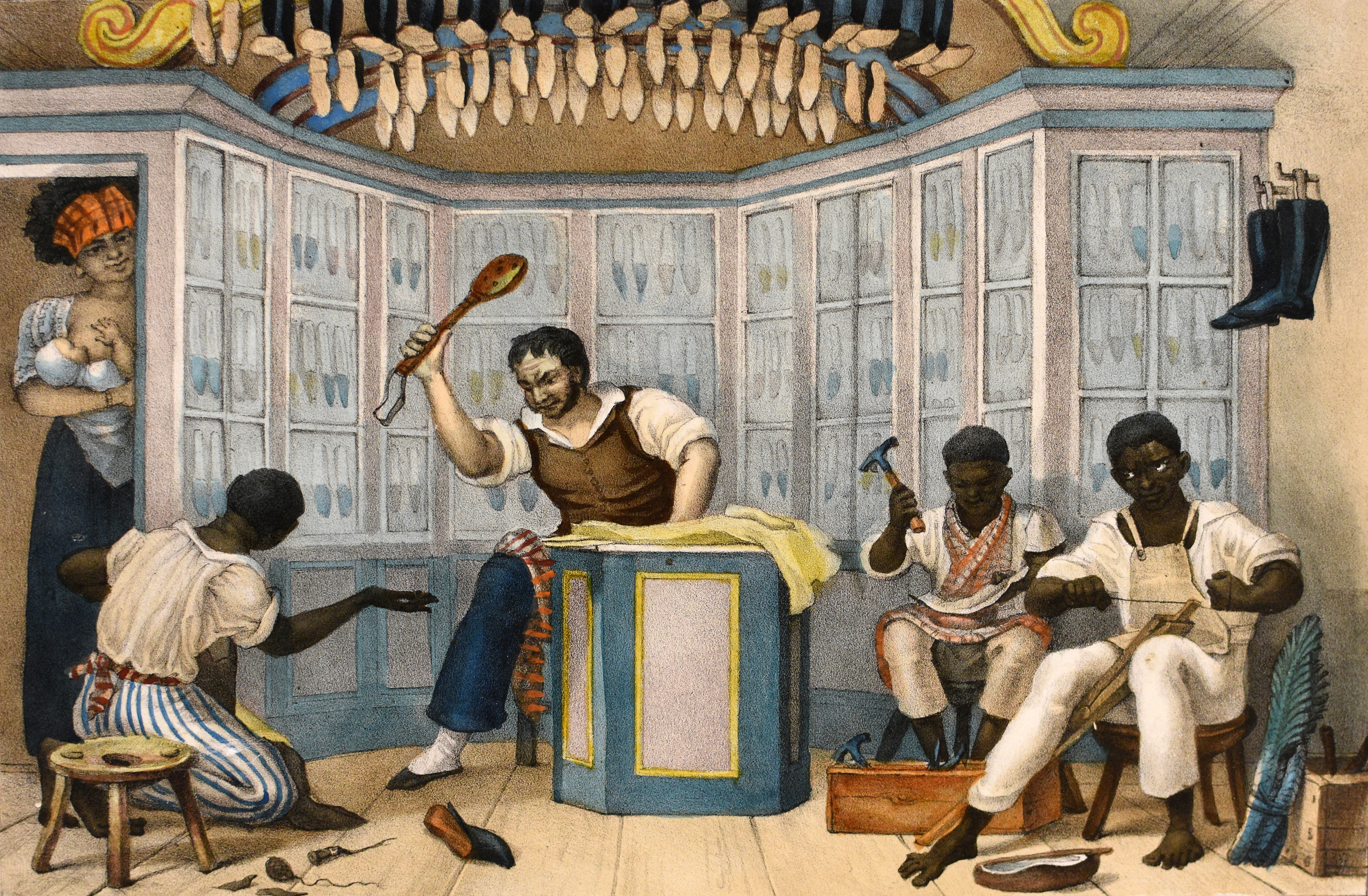
Loja de Sapateiro (Shoe Shop), before 1830

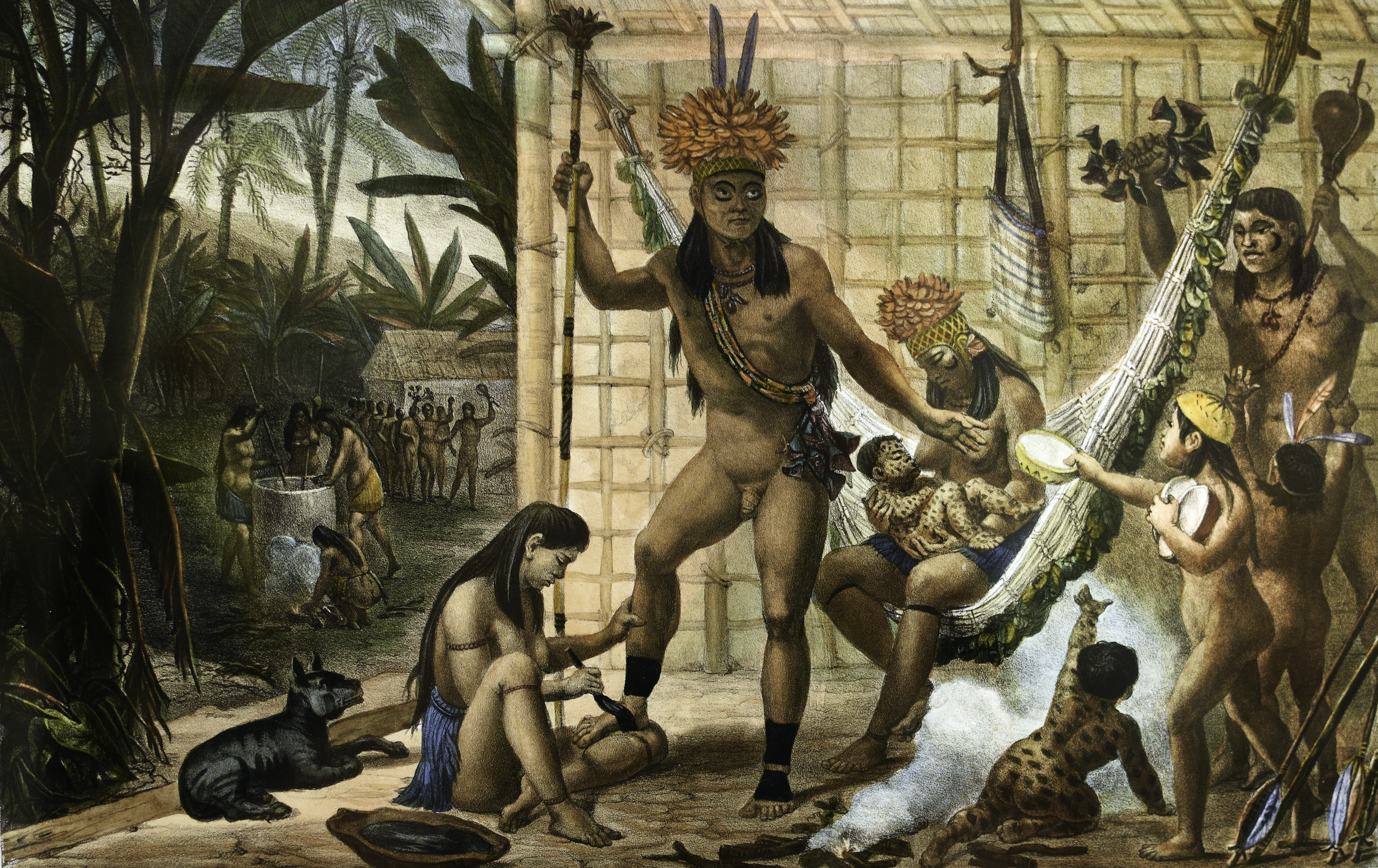
Famille d’un Chef Camacan se préparant pour une Fête, c. 1820-1830

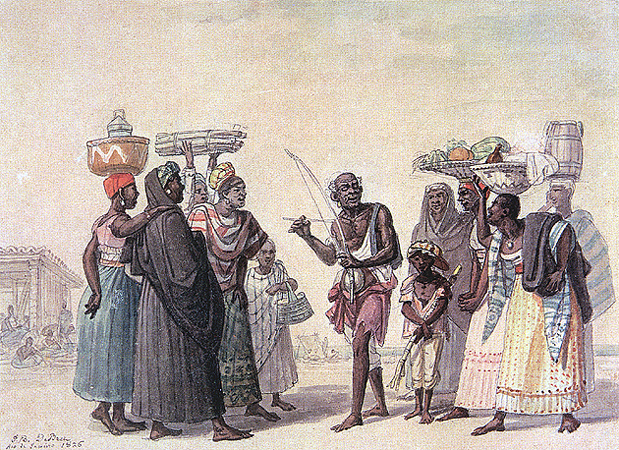
Uruncungo Player

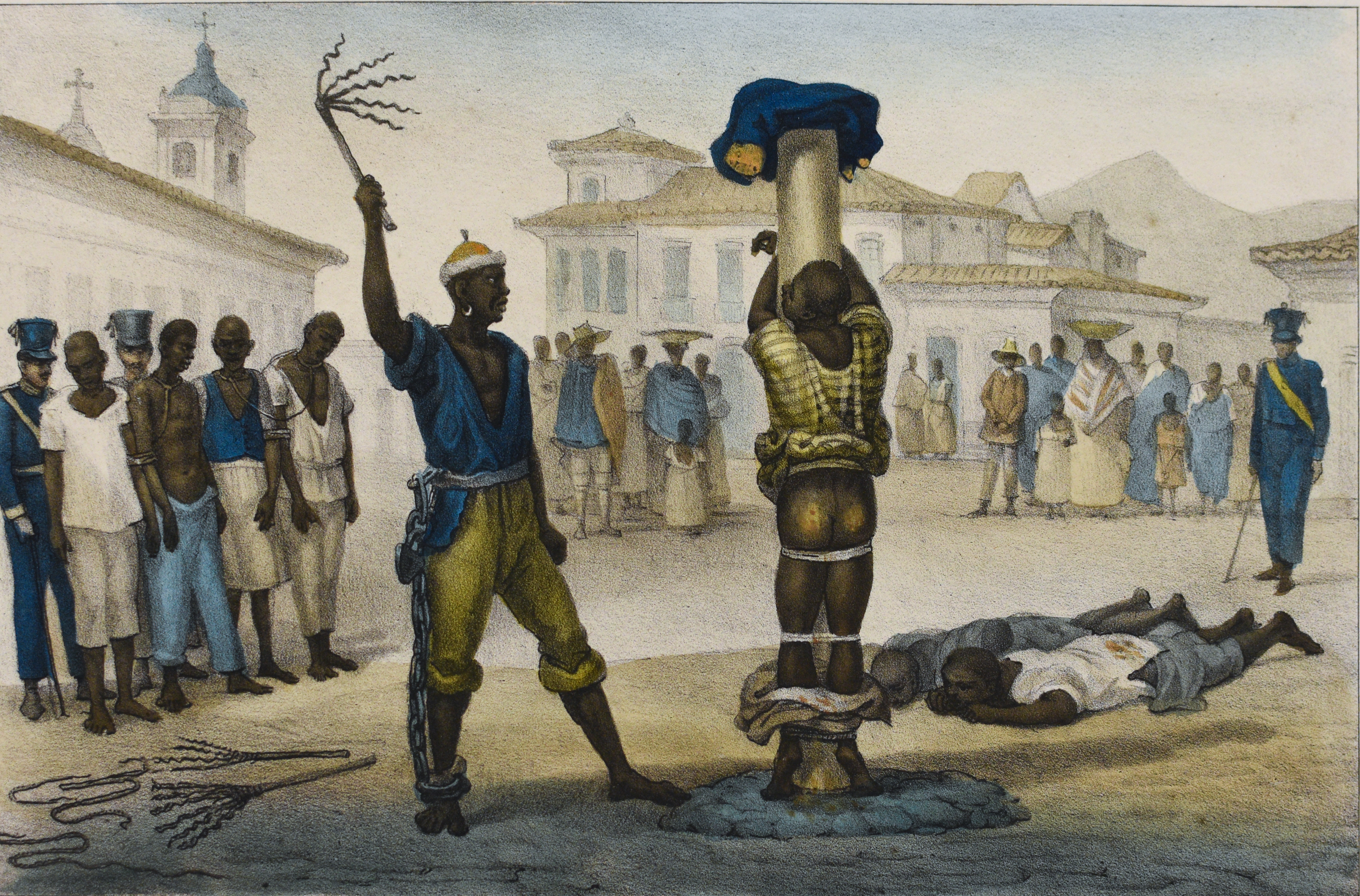
“L’exécution de la Punition du Fouet” (“Execution of the Punishment of the Whip”)

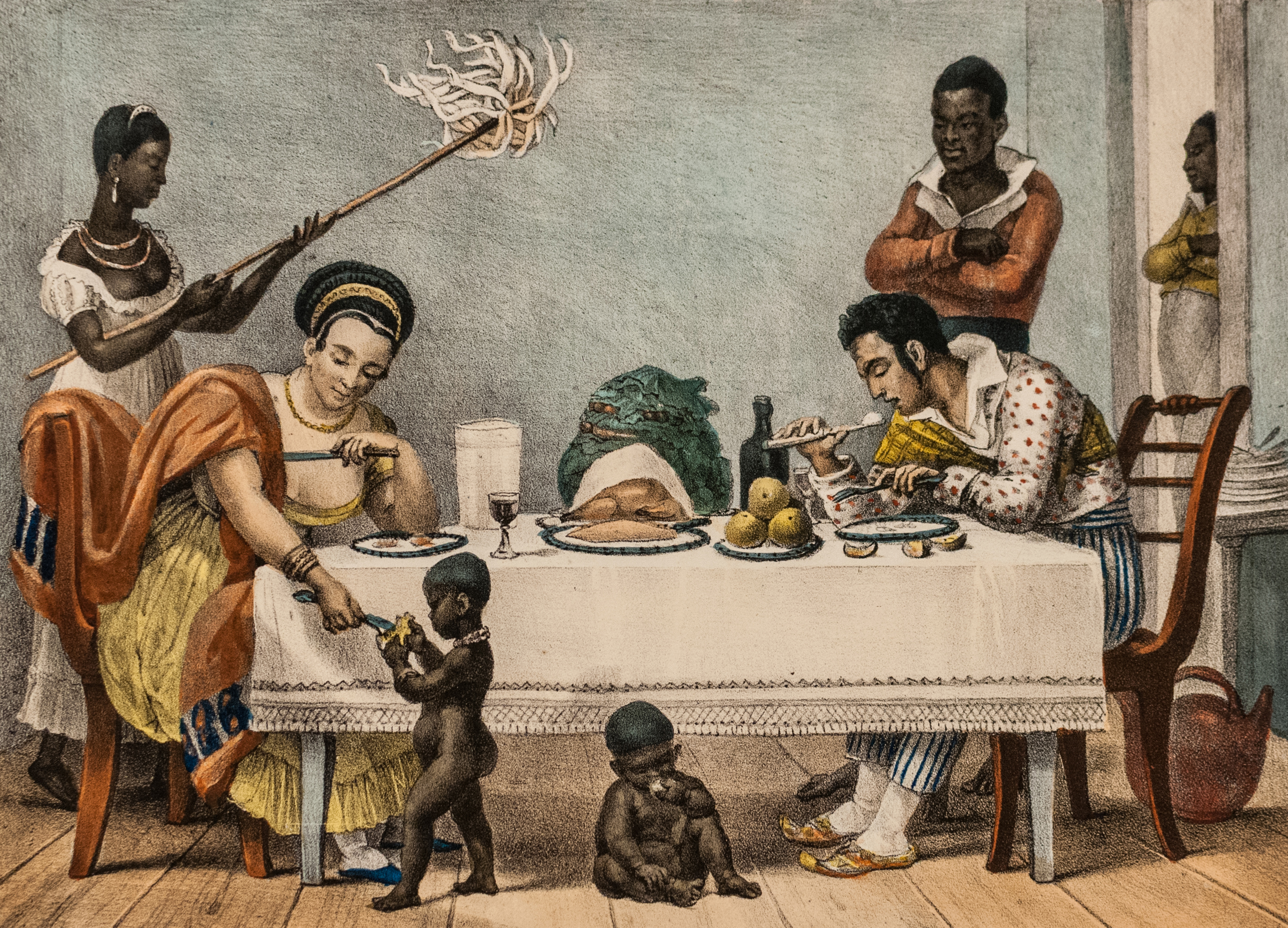
Family dining

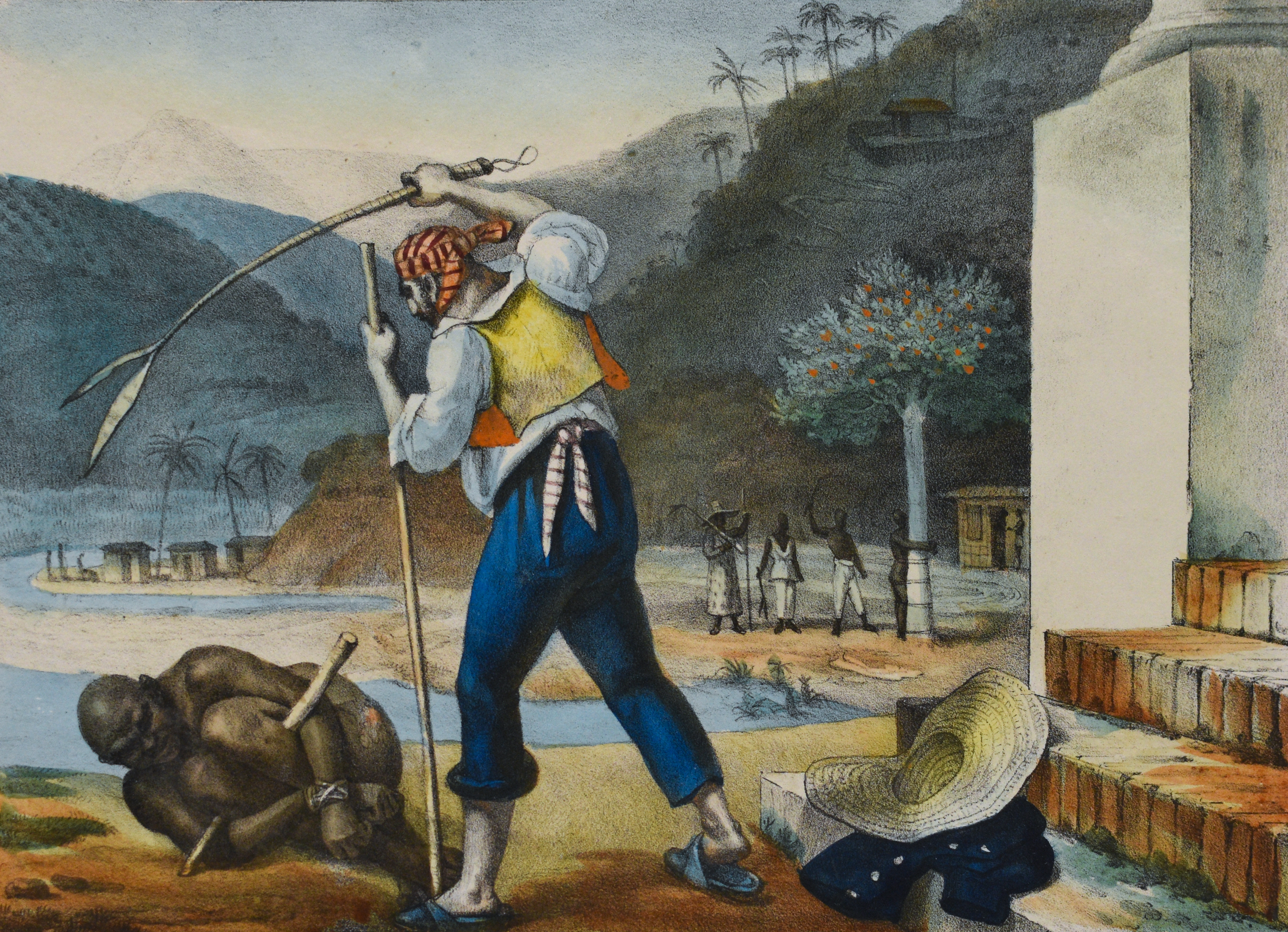
“Feitors corrigeant des nègres” (“Plantation overseers disciplining blacks”)

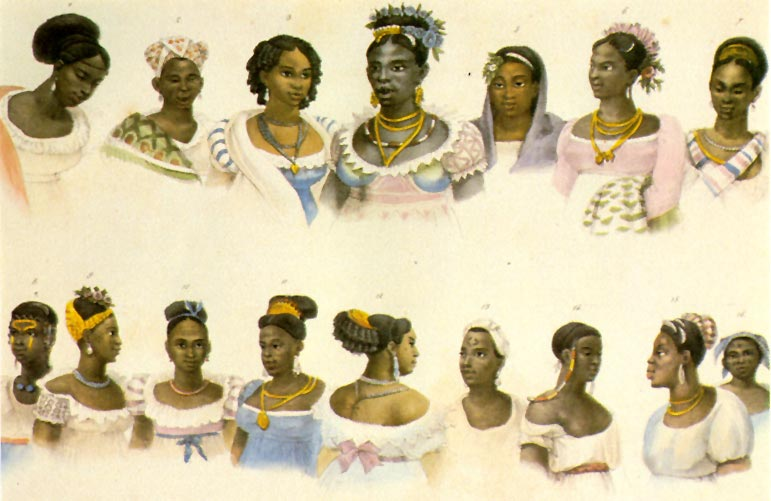
Black women (1835)

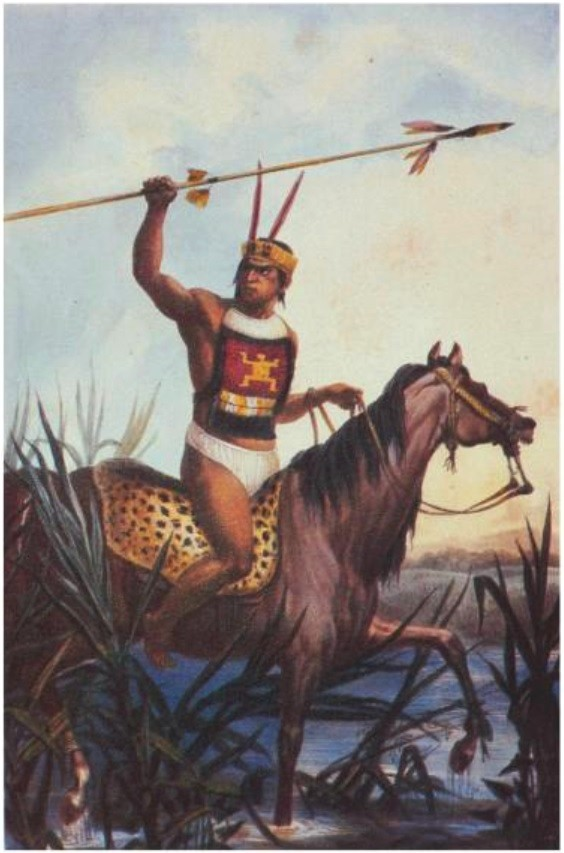
Charrúa warrior

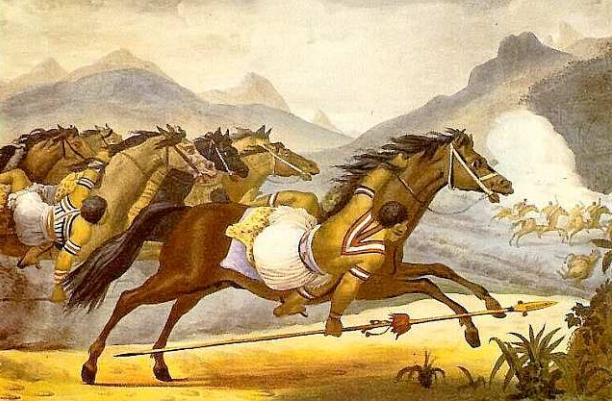
Carga de Cavalaria Guaicuru, 1822

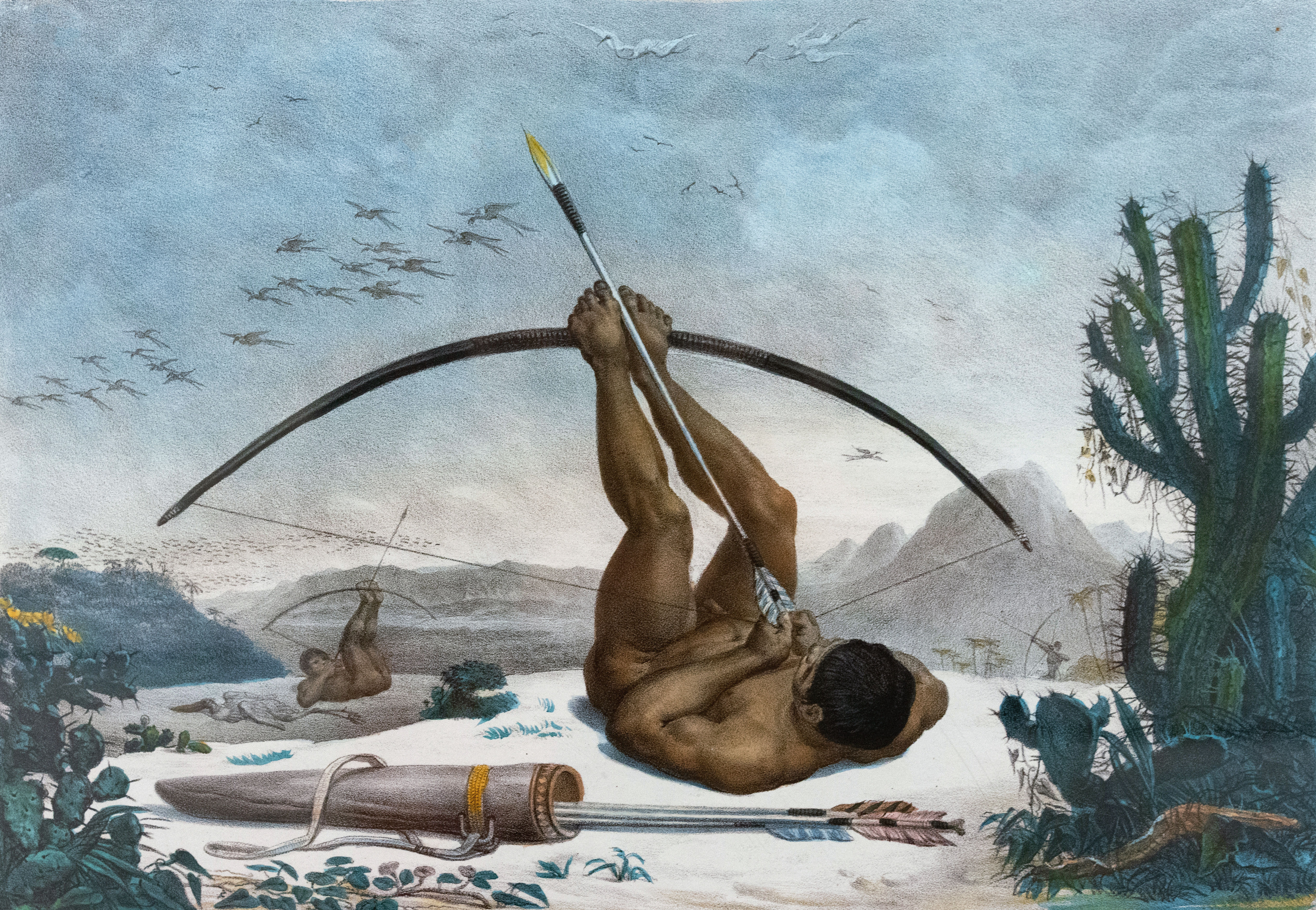
Caboclo, 1834

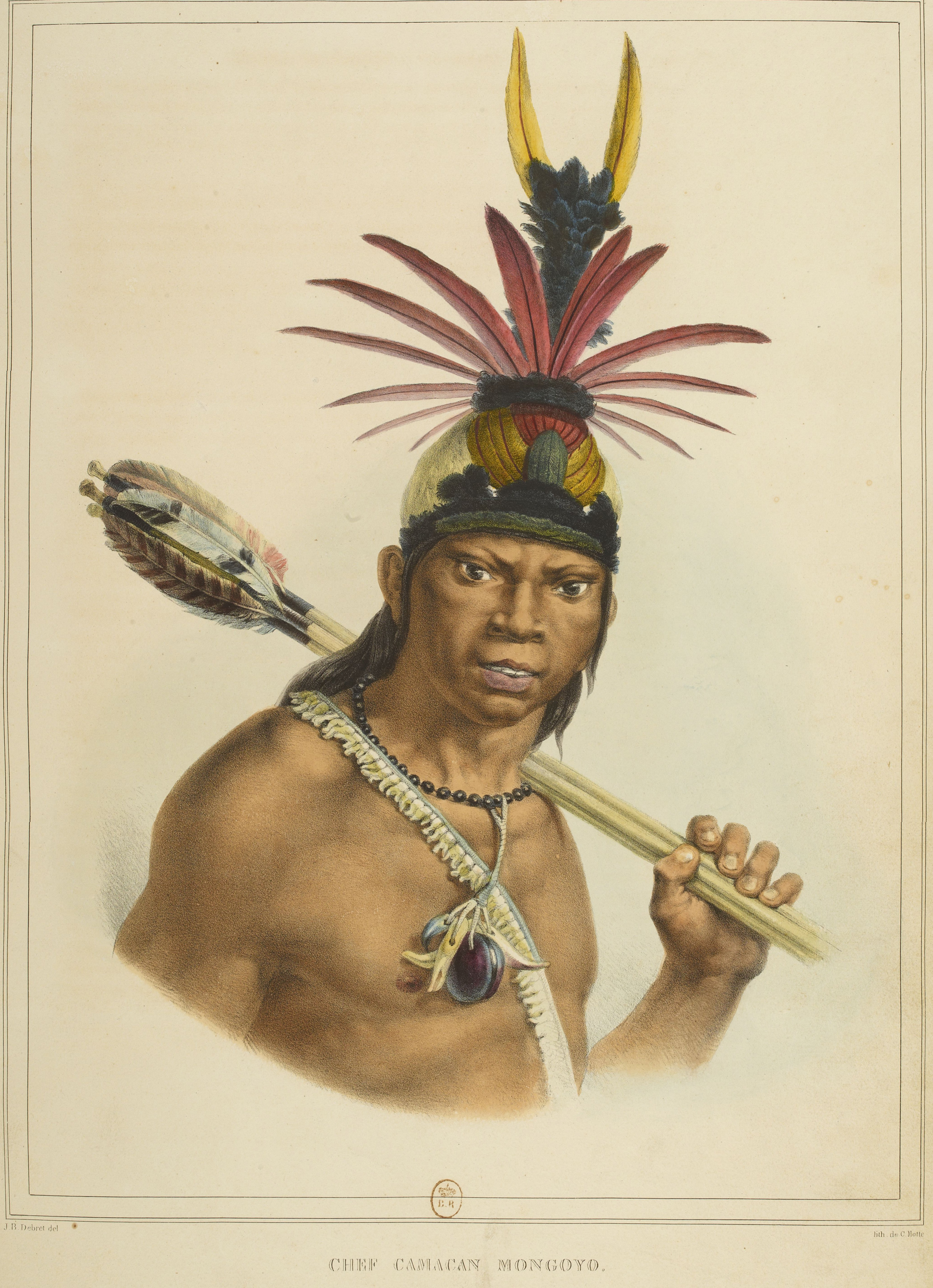
Chefe Camacan Mongoyo, c. 1834-1839

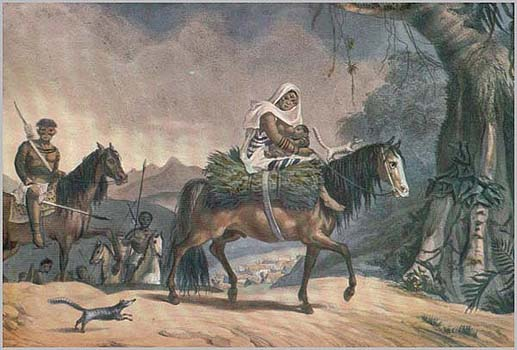
A family of Native Americans

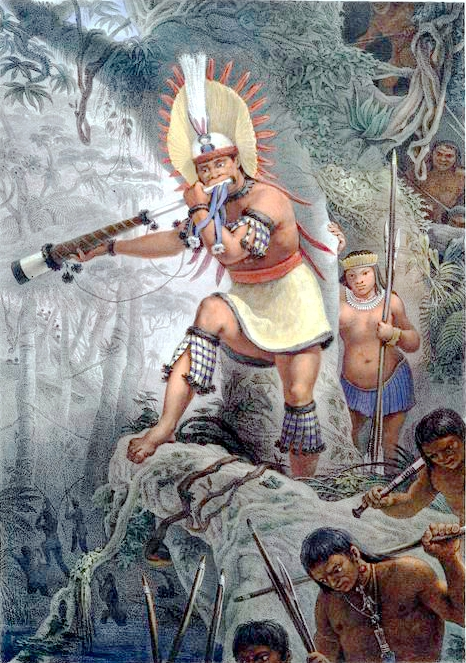
Battle signal of the Coroados, c. 1834-1839

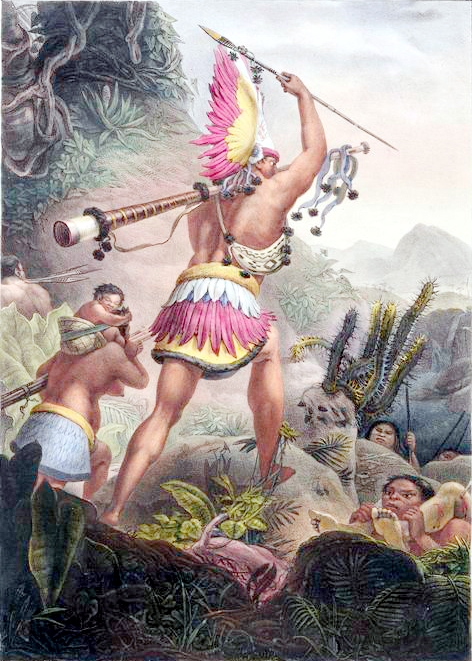
Retreat Signal of the Coroados, c. 1834-1839

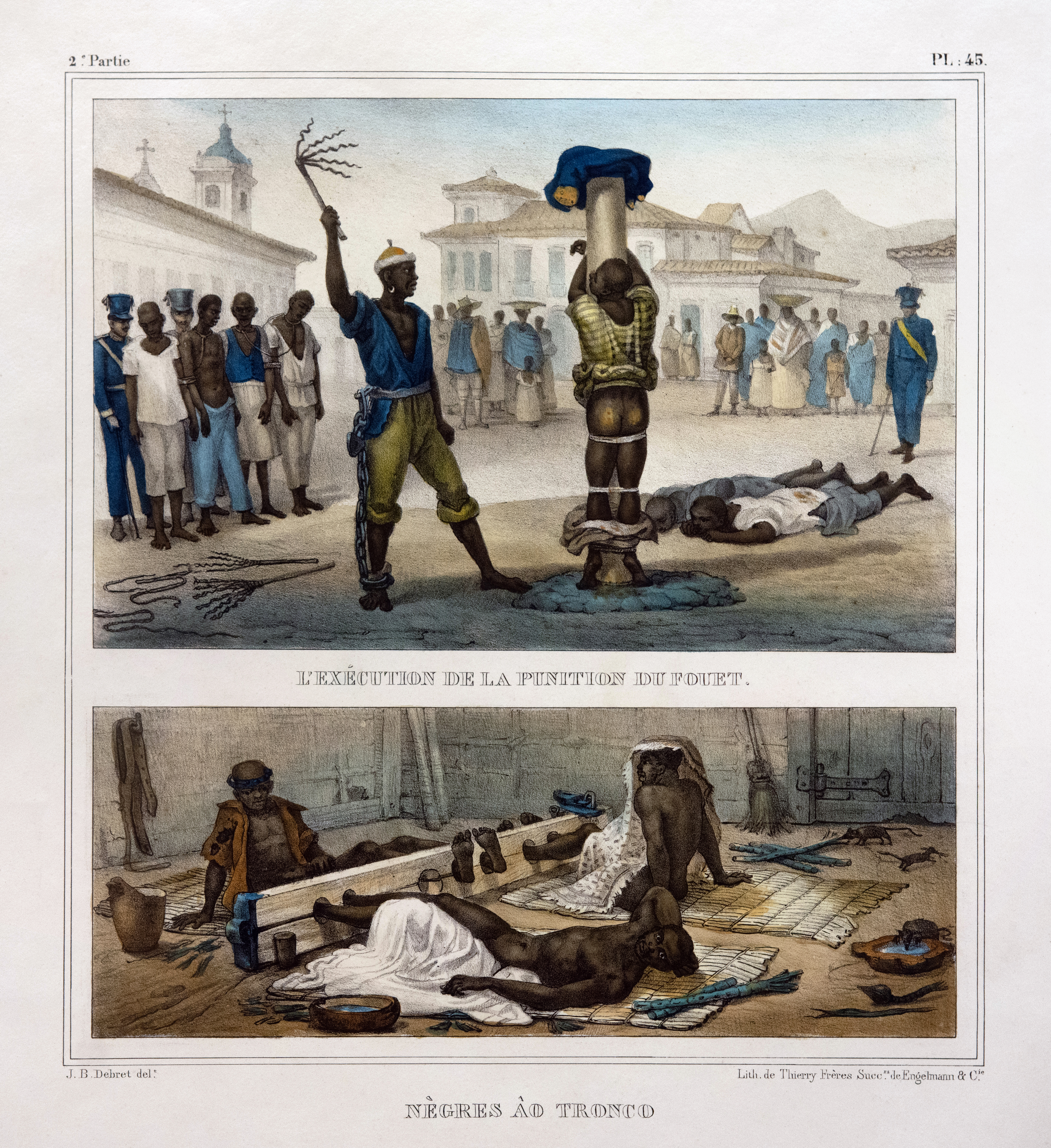
L'Exécution de la Punition du Fouet (top) Nègres ào Tronco (bottom), before 1830
