= Werner Collection in the National Museum of Brazil =

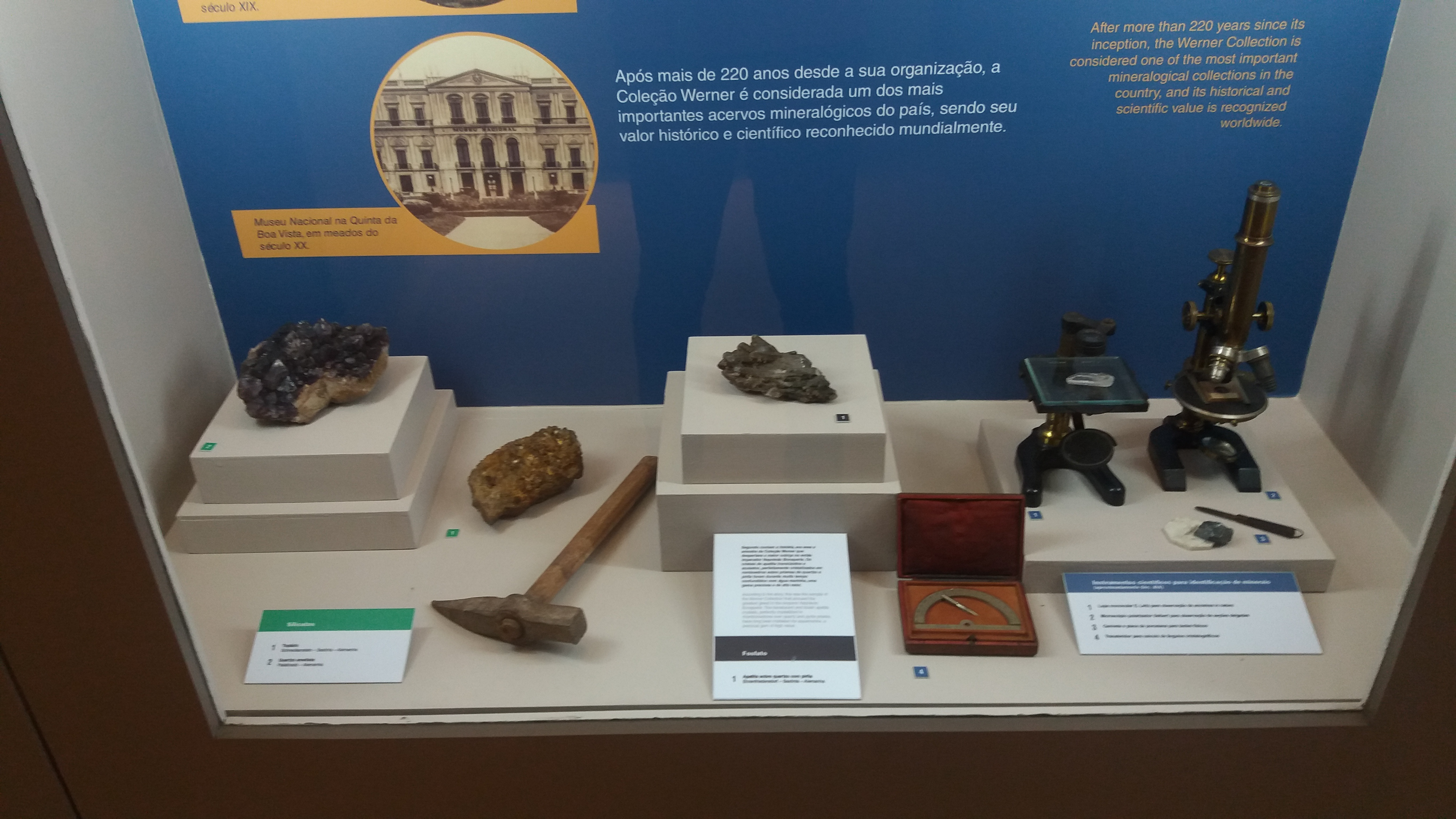
Showcase of the Werner Collection display.

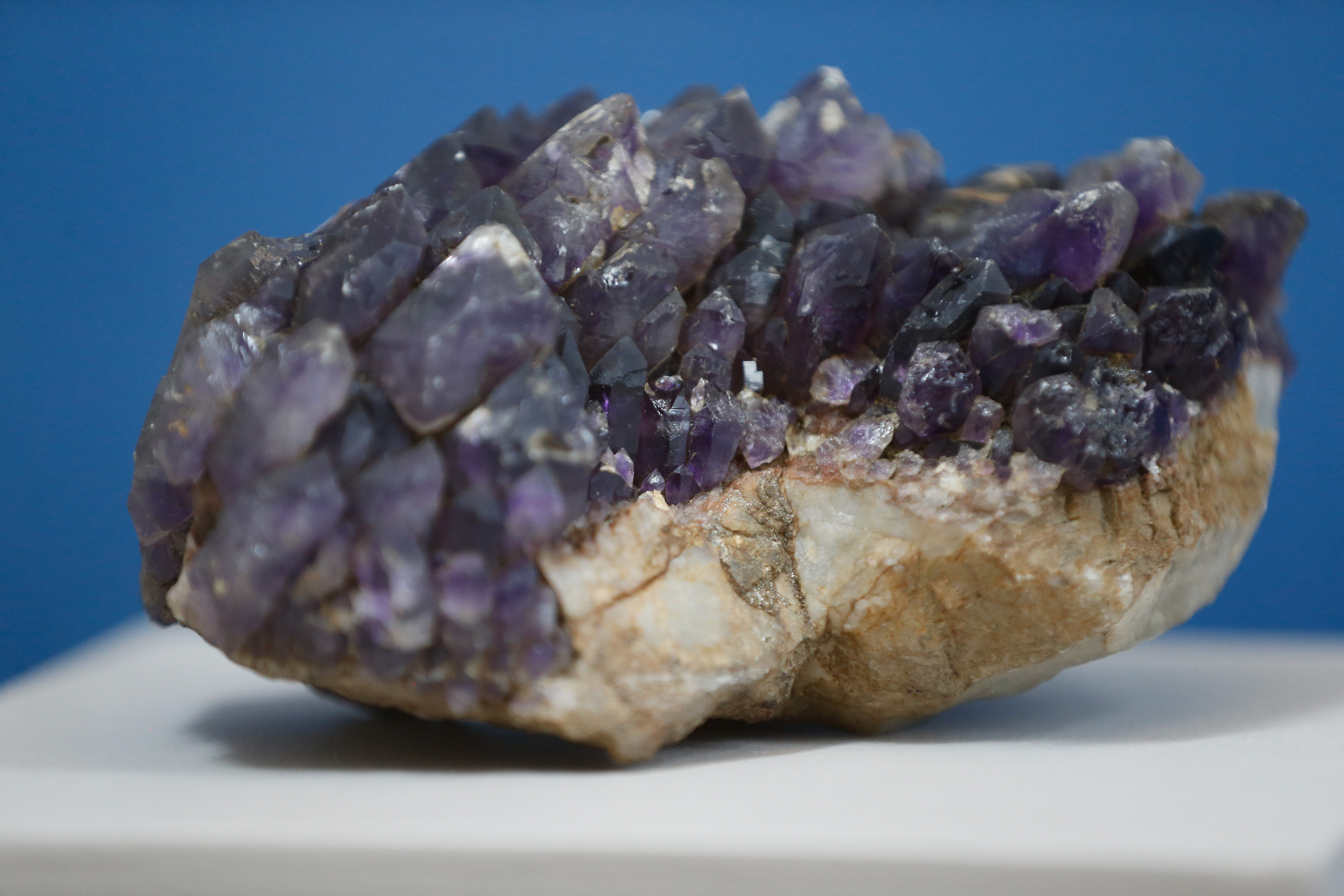
Example of amethyst quartz of the Werner Collection.

The Werner Collection is one of the collections on display at the National Museum of Brazil, in Rio de Janeiro. The collection gathers around 60 rare minerals obtained in the 18th century from the Freiberg Mining Academy, Germany, by the Portuguese nobleman António de Araújo e Azevedo. The name of the collection is due to the main researcher of the German academy, scientist Abraham Gottlob Werner. The collection came to Brazil in the 19th century, brought by the Royal Family, who was escaping from the Napoleonic invasion, and were initially sent to the Royal Military Academy, being moved to the Royal Museum (former name of the National Museu) in 1819. It is considered that it was the first collection to compose the National Museum.

This collection was struck by the fire of 2018 at the National Museum, but it was reported that its restoration will be possible.

== See also ==
- Media related to Werner Collection at Wikimedia Commons
