= Sousa Caldas =

Brazilian priest and poet (1762–1814)

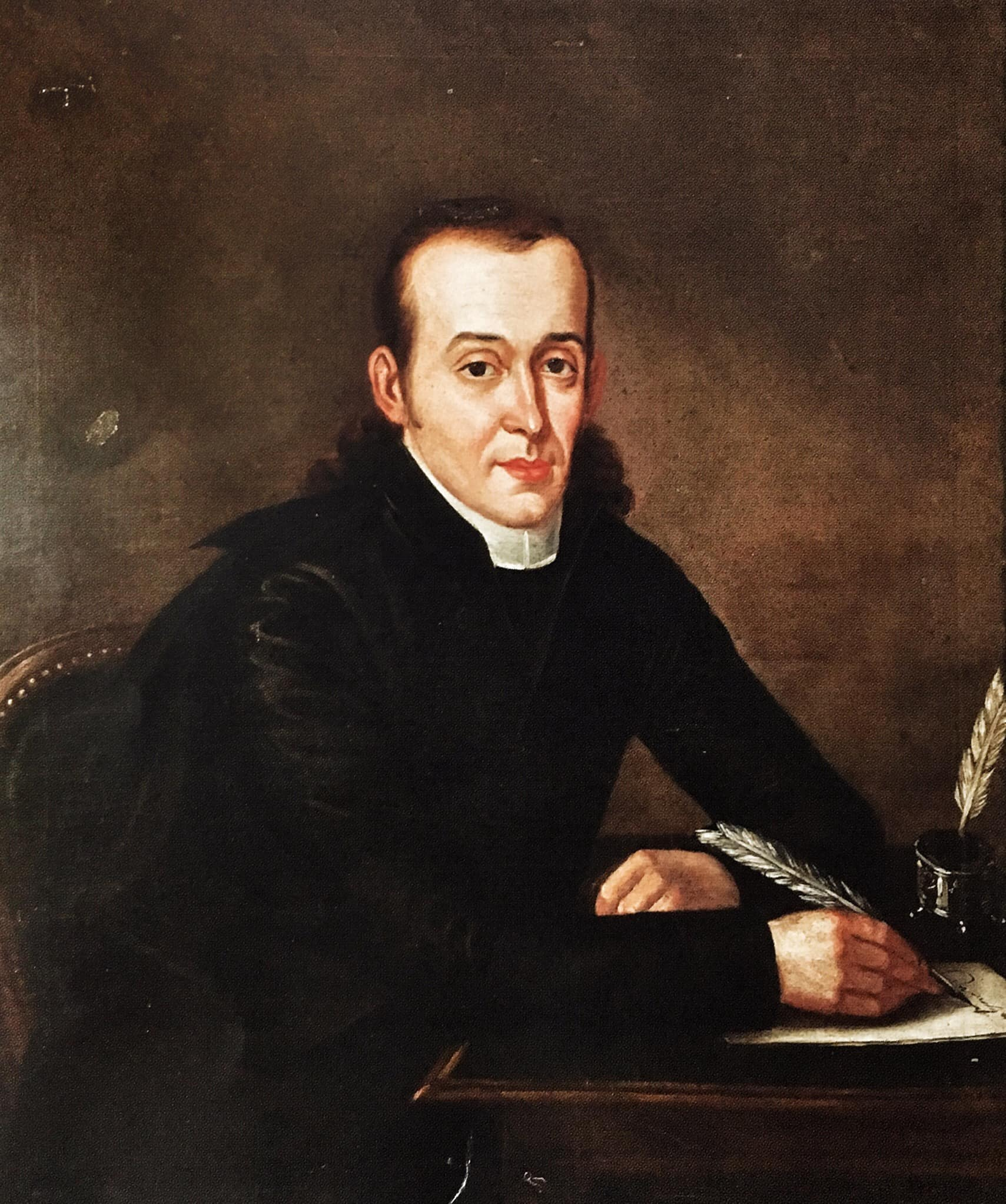
- Portrait by Manuel Dias de Oliveira
- Born: Antônio Pereira de Sousa Caldas; 24 November 1762; Rio de Janeiro City, Rio de Janeiro, Portuguese Colony of Brazil
- Died: 2 March 1814 (aged 51); Rio de Janeiro City, Rio de Janeiro, Portuguese Colony of Brazil
- Education: University of Coimbra
- Occupations: Orator, poet, priest
- Writing career
- Notable works: Ode ao Homem Natural, Poesias Sacras e Profanas
- Literary movement: Neoclassicism

Antônio Pereira de Sousa Caldas (24 November 1762 – 2 March 1814) was a Brazilian poet, priest and orator, patron of the 34th chair of the Brazilian Academy of Letters.

== About ==
Sousa Caldas was born in 1762, to Portuguese merchant Luís Pereira de Sousa and Ana Maria de Sousa. Since he was a small boy, he had a vocation for literature, and, at only 8 years old, he was sent to Lisbon, to live under the care of an uncle. With 16 years old, he entered the University of Coimbra, where he learnt mathematics and canon law.

In 1781, he was arrested by the Inquisition because of his ideals, influenced by the Enlightenment. Transferred to the convent of Rilhafoles, he was catechized for six months. After the catechism, he became a fully different person, discovering his sacerdotal vocation. However, he did not abandoned his philosophical and satirical poetry, writing the poem Ode ao Homem Natural in 1784. It is attributed to him the satire O Reino da Estupidez. He also published the poem Ode ao Homem Selvagem.

After graduating in the canon law course in 1789, he travelled to France and Genoa. In Genoa, he wrote the ode A Criação and abandoned the satirical poetry.

In 1801, he returns to Rio de Janeiro to visit his mother, settling permanently in the town. During his final years in Rio, he wrote many letters for his friends, but only five of them exist today.

He died in 1814.

== Works ==
- Ode ao Homem Natural (1784)
- A Criação (1790)
- Poesias Sacras e Profanas (anthology of poems compiled by Francisco de Borja Garção Stockler and published posthumously in 1820)

Preceded by New creation	Brazilian Academy of Letters – Patron of the 34th chair	Succeeded by João Manuel Pereira da Silva (founder)
