= Francisco António de Araújo e Azevedo =

Portuguese military officer and colonial administrator

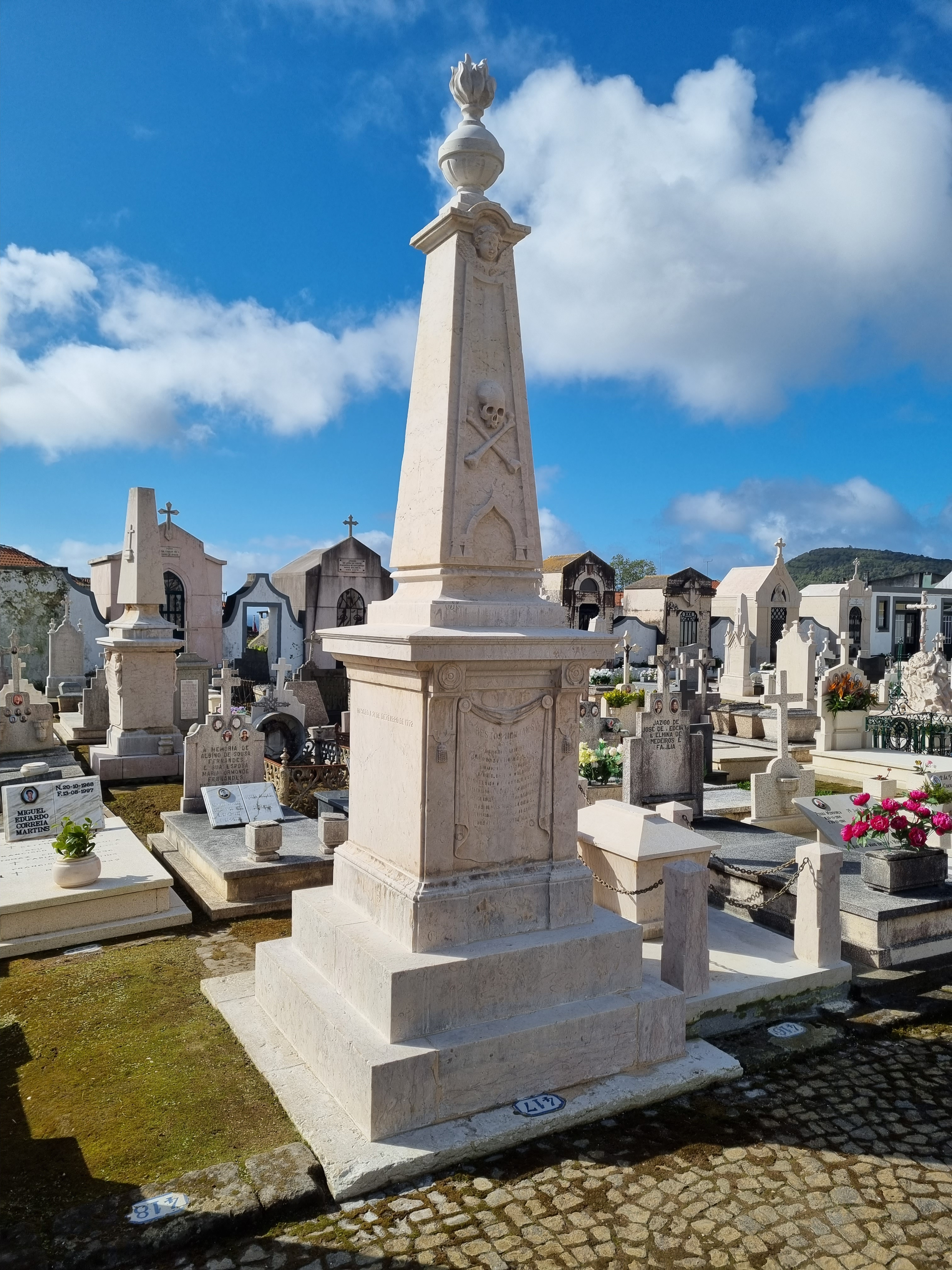
- His grave

7th Captain-General of the Azores
- Monarchs: John VI; Peter IV
- Preceded by: Aires Pinto de Sousa Coutinho
- Succeeded by: Francisco de Borja Garção Stockler

Personal details
- Born: 21 December 1772 Lisbon, Portugal
- Died: April 4, 1821 (aged 48) Angra, Terceira (Azores)
- Resting place: Cemetery of Livramento, Angra do Heroísmo
- Citizenship: Kingdom of Portugal
- Relatives: António de Araújo e Azevedo, 1st Count of Barca (brother)

Francisco António de Araújo e Azevedo (Lisbon, 21 December 1772 — Angra, 4 April 1821) was a Portuguese military officer and colonial administrator. Eventually reaching the rank of brigadier, he was part of the king's council (honoured with the Order of Avis and Order of Tower and Sword), before holding the position as 7th Captain-General of the Captaincy-General of the Azores.

== Biography ==
Francisco was part of the House of Sá e Lage, of Ponte de Lima, and was the brother of António de Araújo e Azevedo (1754-1817), first Count of Barca, an influential politician of the time.

=== Captaincy-General ===
Francisco António was nominated as 7th Captain-general of the Captaincy of the Azores on 20 August 1816, disembarking in Terceira on 11 May 1817: he took-up his office on 14 May 1817.

He began his mandate by promoting the development of agriculture through the Junta de Melhoramentos Agrícolas (Agricultural Improvement Board) of modern agricultural practices, such as the clearing of communal lands. Many of the local farmers did not appreciate these modern practices and assumed that some were attempting to take advantage and destroyed hedgerows and fences under the cover of night, referred to as the Justiça da Noite (Night Justice). The governor quickly imposed his will by sending troops. In order to control herds and transform agriculture from a subsistence to commercial enterprise, the governor had troops intervene and impose his order to cull goats in empty lots (or which had devastated cultivated crops). These measures were badly interpreted by the general population, who developed a hate for him, referring to Captain-General as the mata-cabras (goat-killer).

Fearing potential reprisals against the Azores following the diplomatic crisis between Portugal and Spain (resulting from the Banda Oriental conquest in the province of Cisplatina), in 1817 Araújo e Azevedo promoted the thorough reform of the military structures in the archipelago and the restoration/construction of new forts (such as the Fort of São José, the Fort of São Caetano and the Fort of São João). He also had soldiers and local workers complete military roads, ordered the construction of bridges and munition depots an imposed a regime of daily military exercises. These intense efforts had a demoralizing effect on the populace, and in São Jorge, recruits cut their index fingers in order to avoid service.

It was during his tenure that the sumptuous Church of São João Baptista, whose riches had expanded during the stay of King Afonso VI, was destroyed by fire (1819). The following year he visited São Miguel (who had been without a Captain-General since 1767), and because of the unpopularity of the Captains-General he was obliged to stay in the municipal hall during his stay. Even as he was forced to advance with construction plans for the islands' defenses, owing to local rancor many of his orders from Terceira were never obeyed. At the same time, he promoted the expansion of the first roadway from Ribeira Quente to Furnas, while the first experimental windmill was constructed in Fonte do Bastardo.

Between 1820 and 1821 he resided in the Palácio Bettencourt, which was constructed in the late 17th and early 18th century, eventually becoming the seat of government.

=== Later life ===
Having led the Constitutional Revolt in Angra that deposed his successor, Francisco de Borja Garção Stockler, he was killed in a counter-revolution that occurred on 3–4 April 1821. He was buried in the church of the Fortress of São João Baptista on Monte Brasil, but his remains were later transferred to the cemetery of Livramento in Angra do Heroísmo.
