= Francisco de Borja Garção Stockler =

Portuguese noble and politician (1759–1829)

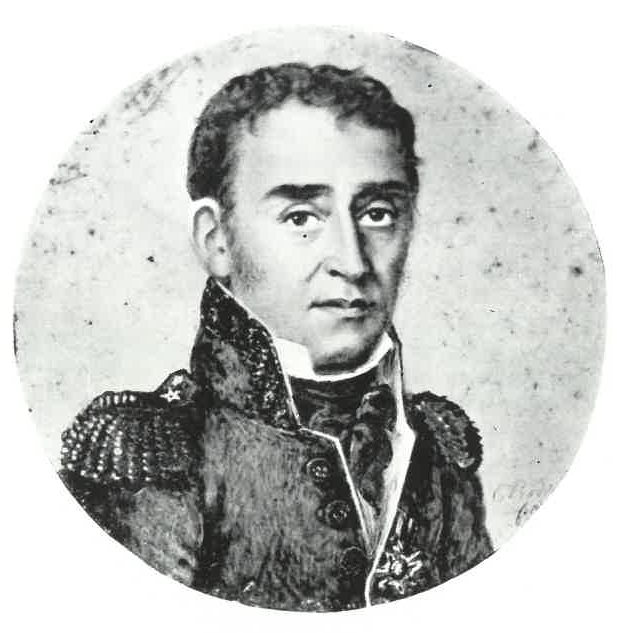

8th Captain-General of the Azores
- Monarch: Peter IV
- Preceded by: Francisco António de Araújo e Azevedo
- Succeeded by: Manuel Vieira de Albuquerque Touvar

Personal details
- Born: 25 September 1759 Lisbon, Portugal
- Died: March 6, 1829 (aged 69) Algarve

Francisco de Borja Garção Stockler, Baron of Vila da Praia (25 September 1759 – 6 March 1829) was a Portuguese politician, soldier, and mathematician. He had the rank of lieutenant general and was the 8th Captain General of the Azores.

During his life he held several posts, many coinciding with the European Peninsular War: lieutenant general in the military, secretary and councilor of the Conselho Ultramarino (Overseas Council), governor of Algarve and Governor/Captain-General of the Azores. He was also a member of the committee that formed the draft of the constitutional charter in 1823, before returning to academia (becoming a professor of mathematics at the Academia Real de Marinha, a deputy director of the Academia Militar do Rio de Janeiro, secretary of the Academia Real das Ciências de Lisboa and fellow of the Royal Society of London, among other honours. He was one of the pioneers in differential calculus and one of the most notable historians of mathematics in Portugal.

== Biography ==
Stockler was born in Lisbon; son of Cristiano Stockler, a Lisbon merchant, and Margarida Joséfa Rita de Orgiens Garção de Carvalho, his grandfather, who was born in Hamburg, traced his roots to the historic cities of the Hanseatic League.

=== Academia ===
Stocker destined his career to the military. By 1784, at the age of 25, he was a captain, enrolled at the University of Coimbra in mathematics. He obtained a bachelor's degree at the Academia Real de Marinha (Royal Marine Academy), where he began his investigation into the limits of differential calculation. While at the Academia Real Stockler was elected member of the Academia Real das Ciências de Lisboa (Lisbon Royal Academy of Sciences) in 1791, beginning a period of academic work resulting in many of publications, including his Memórias da Academia (Memories From The Academy). He published work essentially on the limits of differential calculus, becoming available in Portugal and published in Europe, gaining sufficient notoriety.

On 3 January 1795, Garção Stockler married Inês Gertrudes de Mendonça e Moura, daughter of João Francisco de Moura, who was the customs notary of Lisbon.

In 1806, Stockler was elected as a member to the American Philosophical Society in Philadelphia.

He published other works that honoured academics and politics, among them were biographies of Pascoal José de Melo Freire dos Reis, José Joaquim Soares de Barros e Vasconcelos, Roberto Nunes da Costa, Martinho de Melo e Castro, Bento Sanches de Orta and Guilherme Luís António de Valleré, publishing his Obras Completas (Complete Works) in two volumes (1805 and 1826, respectively). Further, he eulogize d'Alembert, inspired by writing with the Marquis of Condorcet. His honours rarely coincided with Portuguese scientists at the time; on 1 April 1819, he was elected correspondent member or foreign member of the Royal Society of London and written about by others including John Rowley and S. R. Chapman.

=== Peninsular wars ===
He was adjunct to Field Marshal João Carlos de Bragança Sousa e Ligne, 2nd Duke of Lafões, during the 1801 campaigns of the War of the Oranges. Military secretary of the duke, between 1797 and 1801, he published an important paper on conducting operations.

In 1807, following the French invasion, under the command of General Jean-Andoche Junot, the Portuguese Cortes escaped to Brasil, at a time of when Stocker was secretary of the Real Academia das Ciências (Royal Academy of Sciences). He was one of the dignitaries, in the name of Regency, who travelled to Sacavém to receive the invader. This attitude, as well as the election of Junot as a member of the Royal Academy and Stockler's personal presentation of his credentials while secretary of the Academy, resulted in his being labelled as collaborator (while putting him in the confidence of the French). Accepting from Junot the command of the battery of Areia, near Belém, his force impeded the departure of the Portuguese naval shipping for Brazil, thereby proving his alignment with the French.

For his actions, and following the retreat of the French, the Portuguese Regency stripped him of his positions and privileges. As part of a requirement for then-Brigader Stocker, to be reintegrated into the Portuguese military, a letter from the Count of Linhares, then-Minister for the Prince Regent in Brazil wrote:

Having brought to the august presence of His Royal Highness the Prince Regent, our lord, the enclosed letter and more papers from Brigadier Francisco de Borja Garção Stockler, whose military talents were verified in the campaign of 1801, are still constant to the same gentleman, in whose Royal presence he is, moreover, unaccredited for the mission to Junot for which he was sent, and later for his command of a battery at Areia alongside the Tower of Belém, whence barbarously he had to shoot on Portuguese ships, which were sailing out the Tagus; however, His Royal Highness, hearing of your sentiments for incomparable justice and piety, it would be useful for the governors of the kingdom to inform (interposing their opinion, and after hearing from your Marshall General or the Marshall General of the Army), whether there would exist an active place in the face of the enemy, where this supplicant can be employed, and in this case they could propose him for that post, so that it may be verified whether he really has great military talents, or whether in this matter, as in others, he is overvalued beyond what he is worth; which is well known when, as a mathematician, he wanted to associate himself with the so justly famous Lagrange. — Palace of Santa Cruz, on November 25, 1809. — Count of Linhares.

His collaborationism with the French Army and the military incompetency in the Orange War campaigns, were published in História Geral da Invasão dos Franceses (General History of the French Invasion) by José Acúrsio das Neves, resulting in a public polemic. Stocker responded to this by personally publishing Cartas ao autor da História Geral da Invasão dos Franceses em Portugal, which the Royal Academy refused to publish. The controversy did not subside, and he continued to post various opinions, including his Investigador Portuguez to refute public opinion. However, despite being despised by nobility and public classes, he succeeded in reintegrating into the Portuguese military, being promoted to major general and restarting his career, against all odds.

=== Regency ===
In 1812, he departed for Brazil, to join the Cortes, where he conquered, through his intellectual abilities, the confidence of the government-in-exile and the Prince Regent. Stockler was residing in Rio when, following the death of Queen Maria, the Prince Regent was acclaimed as King VI. He was commission by the Lisbon Royal Academy of Sciences to present a speech on behalf of the institution during the course of the king's investiture, which was published in the first tome of Memórias da Academia.

In addition to his academic work in mathematics, Garção Stockler became interested in poetry, writing Poesias Lyricas (Lyrical Poems), that featured Horatian does, traditional stories and the philosophical poem Aves, which was later published by Brazilian poet António Pereira de Sousa Caldas. Submitted to the Academy, the poem was considered for publication in 1819, but owing to violating the Catholic orthodoxy of the time, he was required to edit his ideas considered paradoxical. Stockler refused to alter his work, and published it in London, resulting in its condemnation by the Vatican, being registered on 23 June 1836 in the Index Librorum Prohibitorum. At the same time, though, Stockler elaborated his Ensaio histórico on the origin and progress of mathematics in Portugal, later published in Paris, that was critically acclaimed by José Silvestre Ribeirão (in Resenha de Litteratura Portugueza) and as an insert in the Annaes das Ciencias. This work, which was reedited, is considered one of the best histories of mathematical thought until the 19th century, one of the first works of its time in Europe. He also became interested in education, authoring a study on the establishment of public instruction in Brazil, and history of education and pedagogical studies.

Stockler was a deputy in the Junta de Direcção da Academia Militar (Military Academy Junta) of Rio de Janeiro, where, along with Wilhelm Ludwig Freiherr von Eschwege, the Baron of Eschwege, was responsible for restoring the study of mathematics and physics.

=== Captaincy-General ===
==== Liberalism ====
During his stay in Rio de Janeiro, the Cortes began to receive complaints related to Brigadier Francisco António de Araújo e Azevedo as Governor and Captain-General of the Azores. The populations of the archipelago and insular authorities complained of the military rigor and preferential attitude of the official when conceding lands. In this case, Araújo e Azevedo conceded land to friends of the Captain-General, over the interests of the people and municipal authorities. This appropriation of the vacant lands gave rise to deep hatreds and disagreements, and led to the Justiça da Noite (Night Justice) where hedgerows were destroyed to force communal land policies.

At Corte and having gained notoriety for his academic work and intelligence, Stockler managed to be appointed by John VI (12 November 1819) to replace the former-Captain-General, who had fallen in disgrace. Stockler left for Lisbon in August 1820, with the intention of receiving from the Regency the orders necessary to govern the Azores. It was during this time that a constitutional movement was taking form on the continent, resulting in the Liberal Revolution of 1820 when Stockler arrived in Lisbon. Obviously anti-Liberal, his Jacobist fame and French collaboration during the French invasion helped him to obtain an affirmation by the Liberal revolutionaries for his position, permitting his departure for the islands. He arrived on 18 October 1820 and was received by a fervor, owing to his replacing the unpopular Araújo e Azevedo. Both political groups in the Azores were hopeful for his tenure: the Liberals, expected a confirmation of the Pro-Constitutional ideas, and the Absolutists, convinced that his nomination by King D. John VI before the revolution, would guarantee his support for the dominance of the monarchy. The Absolutists were immediately vindicated when Stockler prohibited political contact with Portugal and requested new members of the administration and judiciary from Rio de Janeiro, ignoring the legitimacy and authority of Liberal institutions in Lisbon.

When the Liberals realized that the new Captain-General was not an ally, the Azoreans began a movement to proclaim, by revolution, a constitutional model in the archipelago. Capitalizing on the discontent with the governance of the Captains-General, on 1 March 1821, a military revolt in Ponta Delgada erupted, headed-by Noronha and lieutenant João Soares de Albergaria, inspired by civil elements angry with the dominance of Terceira (militarily and economically). A constitutional regime was installed in São Miguel, proclaiming the independence of the island from the dominion of the government in Angra. This bloodless revolution was supported by members of the nobility, clerics, magistrates and councilors. On the following day many of the municipal authorities supported to revolt. On 27 March 1821, Stockler publishes a proclamation to the people of São Miguel, condemning the separation of the Captaincy General and admonishing the consequences of the oath to a non-existent Constitution. But, the interim government did not lose time and revoked many of the laws that subordinated the island of São Miguel to Terceira, abolishing taxes and annulling orders of Stockler that prohibited contacts with the Liberal continent. Meanwhile, the Junta Governativa of the Kingdom, established on the continent, recognized the Interim government administration in São Miguel and Santa Maria, and placed Stockler in charge of the remaining islands. Stockler was duplicitous: he feign support for the Liberals but fiercely pursued them and their sympathizers. In April a contingent that included André da Ponte Quental (grandfather of the illustrious Micaelense poet Antero de Quental) and Father Medeiros Mântua presented criticisms and complaints in Lisbon that included accusations of misappropriations of the treasury and overburdening the population, as well as a requesting a bishopric for the two islands. In response, Lisbon ordered the division of the Azores into three comarcas (Ponta Delgada, Angra and Horta) governed by Juízes Corregedores (Judge Magistrates) who among their functions oversaw their treasuries.

On 13 May 1821, the frigate Pérola arrived on Terceira, commanded by commanded by Captain-of-Sea-and-War, Marshall Pedro de Ataíde Barahona, who intimated that Stockler should recognize the Liberal government. Stockler countered and resisted the intimidation, but did not find the support he expected from the population. On 14 April 1821, a revolution broke out in Angra, inspired by those deported from the Amazonas and those loyal to Francisco António de Araújo e Azevedo, forcing Stockler to take refuge in Praia. The municipal council proclaimed the Interim government under Araújo e Azevedo, but the Liberal cause was not as popular as the rebels assumed: he was shot during a counter-revolution and impaled by bayonets, his body taken in loud macabre procession through the streets of Angra. Stockler took power and advantage of the situation to imprison all those suspected of being liberals that the mob insulted and attacked on the way to the Fortress of São João Baptista arrested. He confiscated their goods and took refuge himself, cautiously, in that fortification, surrounded by soldiers on all sides.

During the context of this uprising, Almeida Garrett (who had recently founded the Coimbra masonic lodge Sociedade dos Jardineiros and was interested in firming-up the constitutional legality of the Revolution) encountered strong opposition from Stockler, who threatened to imprison him if he manifested publicly in favor of the Constitution. This period resulted in a heroic/comic poem "O X" that Garrett wrote, but did not complete, alluding to the Captain-General.

But things quickly changed as the Congress in Lisbon announced the return of the King, ordering the imprisonment of Stockler and his confederate, the Bishop of Angra (Friar Manuel Nicolau de Almeida), who had collaborated with the General in the repression of Liberals, as well as the creation of Interim Government in Angra elected by the populace. As a result, on 15 May 1821, a solemn ceremony was realized at the Municipal Palace/Hall of Angra where the populace announced their loyalty to the future constitution. Stockler abdicated his position as Governor and Captain-General but, along with Manuel Nicolau de Almeida, tried to remain as an "attache" to the government. This "solution" was not acceptable to the Cortes, and on 19 July 1822, the brig Flor do Mar arrived in Terceira to remove Stockler and the bishop (11 August 1822).

==== Exile ====
Stockler arrived in Lisbon and was immediately arrested and imprisoned in the tower of São Julião da Barra, by order of the Cortes, resulting in a long process in the press, that included debates and ridicule. His actions were refuted by Luiz Manuel de Moura Cabral, of the Casa da Supplicação, in letters that described the events on Terceira, in addition to illustrated observations in Campeão Lisbonense, Voz da Verdade provada por documentos and the pamphlet Voz da Verdade, as well as an analysis of the libelous Noticia resumida dos acontecimentos da ilha Terceira na installação do seu governo constitucional. Stockler responded in his own name in some critical notes, published in 1822 by Dr. Vicente José Ferreira Cardoso da Costa, to the Count of Arcos. All these questions and judicial processes ended with the fall of the constitutional government in 1823, stemming from the Absolutist Vilafrancada supported by Queen and the Infante D. Miguel, which left Stockler with an unblemished record in the eyes of the new monarchist government. As a result, on 10 June 1823, it was concluded that Stockler provided loyal service to the Crown within the legal framework bestowed on him, and his career was rehabilitated, along with that of Bishop Manuel Nicolau de Almeida. As one of the politicians liberated in the aftermath of the fall of the government, Stockler was seen as a celebrity, and nominated to elaborate the new legal Charter. But, the commission was extinguished before ever producing a new Charter, yet he was invested with title of Baron of Vila da Praia by decree, on the 29 September 1823. When Stockler was re-appointed Captain-General of the Azores, many of the absolutists filed into the streets with clubs attacking and arresting Liberals.

==== Absolutism ====
Stockler arrived in Terceira aboard the Princesa de Portugal on 17 November 1823, accompanied by 500 soldiers, where he resumed his functions two days after arriving Angra. His reception was apotheosis, with three days of festivities and one day devoted to unceasing honors and oaths of fidelity. After installed in his position the "new" Captain-General immediately began to persecute the remnants of Liberal government and their sympathizers; there were numerous arrests and expulsions from the island, a reign of terror that paralleled the Castilian invasion of 1583. The other islands of the archipelago quickly stepped into line; on São Miguel the administration proclaimed their obedience to the King in order to save their newfound autonomy, as did politicians on Faial.

Meanwhile, on the continent, Miguel of Portugal pursued a similar policy of jailing his political opponents until 14 May 1824 (the Abrilada) when he attempted to force the King to abdicate and was forced into exile. Consequently, Stockler was fired by the new government, at the initiative of the Count of Subserra, a Terceirense who was appointed to the ministry of King John VI. On 24 July 1824, Manuel Vieira de Albuquerque Touvar arrived in the Azores to take up his functions as the ninth Captain-General, and a few days later Stockler left again for an uncertain future.

=== Later life ===
At the end of July 1824, Stockler arrived to Lisbon, but abandoned politics, returning to his beginnings in mathematics and political debate. A year later, he submitted to the Academy Método inverso dos limites ou desenvolvimento das funções algorítmicas, but was once again, considered inappropriate for publication: it was the third time that it was rejected by the Academy. Affronted, he submitted his resignation and printed his work on his own. The second volume of his Obras completas was published in 1826, with eulogies to academics Tomás Caetano do Bem and Pascoal José de Melo (an appendix on the history of the French invasion and press freedoms, respectively). A larger demonstration of his predecessor in 1807 and 1812 and a project on the establishment of public instruction in Brazil, in addition to a long letter to Jácome Ratton. In 1827, finally, as questions of constitutionality were debated in the country, Stockler wrote Elementos de Direito Social ou Princípios de Direito Natural, to serve as a base for civil constitutions.´

Following the return of D. Miguel to Portugal, Stockler affirmed his loyalty to the absolutist cause, resulting in his nomination to the post of Governador das Armas to the province of the Algarve. He died on 6 March 1829 in his post.

== Published works ==
Garção Stockler was the author of voluminous works on mathematics, and gained fame and was nominated as a correspondent at the Royal Society in London, the history of politics. The latest area involves warlike accesses, published numerous auto-justified texts along with his pseudonym, others in name of his son António Nicolau de Moura Stockler. The absolutist connotation of Stockler brought an implantation of liberalism on his work and wrote Ensaio histórico sobre a origem e progressos das matemáticas em Portugal

- Mathematics:
  - Compêndio da teoria dos limites, ou introdução ao método das fluxões, Lisbon, 1794;
  - Memórias sobre os verdadeiros princípios do método das fluxões
  - Demonstração do teorema de Newton sobre a soma das potencias das raízes das equações
  - Lettre a Mr. le Redacteur du "Monthly Review" ou Réponse aux objections qu'on a faites dans ce journal à la methode des limites des fluxions hypothétiques, London, 1800
  - Carta a Anton Felkel acerca do seu método para determinar os factores dos números naturais
  - Memória sobre as equações de condição das funções fluxionais (Memories On The Equations Of The Condition Of Fluctional Functions)
  - Lição duodécima dos elementos de Geometria, a qual tem por título das correlações que existem entre as operações elementares da technia geométrica e da technia algébrica, Lisboa, 1819
  - Memória sobre algumas propriedades das coeficientes dos termos do binómio de Newton
  - Método inverso dos limites ou desenvolvimento das funções algorítmicas (Inverse Memories On Limits On Involvement Of Algorithmic Functions), Lisbon, 1825.
- Mathematical history:
  - Ensaio histórico sobre a origem e progressos das matemáticas em Portugal (Historic Essay On The Origin And Progress Of Mathematics In Portugal), Paris, 1819 ([VII], 168, [1] p. ; 21 cm).
- Poetry and literature:
  - Breve notícia da vida e obras de Francisco Dias Gomes, inserta como prefácio das Obras Poéticas de Francisco Dias Gomes, published by the Academia Real das Ciências de Lisboa
  - Poesias lyricas (Lyric Poems) - a volume that contains 18 Horatian odes, 12 traditional sonts, and a song on philosophical poem Aves by the Brazilian poet Sousa Caldas
  - Anotações e aditamentos às obras do Padre António Pereira de Sousa Caldas, published in London.
- Essays, warlike and politics:
  - Obras Completas (Completed Works), volume I, Lisboa, 1805;
  - Obras Completas (Completed Works), volume II, Lisboa, 1826;
  - Cartas ao autor da História Geral da Invasão dos Franceses em Portugal (Letters Of The Author On The General History Of The French Invasion Of Portugal), Rio de Janeiro, 1813;
  - Discurso dirigido em nome da Academia Real das Sciencias a S.M. o Senhor D. João VI, por occasião da sua exaltação ao throno, Rio de Janeiro, 1813
  - Memória à Academia Real das Ciências de Lisboa onde se demonstra a primazia dos descobrimentos portugueses no século XV;
  - Elementos de Direito Social, ou princípios de Direito natural, que devem servir de base á constituição das sociedades civis
  - Análise da Memória publicada pelo Dr. José Martins da Cunha Pessoa (Analysis Of The Published Memories About Dr. José Martins da Cunha Pessoa), published under his son's name and republished in 1816 in Rio e Janeiro
  - Memorial dirigido ao Il.mo Sr. Luiz Manuel de Moura Cabral, desembargador da Casa da Suplicação, ilustrado com algumas notas, Lisbon, 1822;
  - Cartas sobre os acontecimentos da ilha Terceira, por um Cidadão imparcial (1st, 2nd and 3rd, all written under his son's name, António Nicolau de Moura Stockler in which he was 17 at that time);
  - Nota ao n.º 75 do Campeão Lisbonense por um Amigo do general;
  - Observações ou notas ilustrativas do folheto intitulado «Voz da Verdade provada por documentos»
  - Carta sobre o n.º 2 do folheto intitulado a «Voz da Verdade», (escrita em nome do filho)
  - Análise crítica ao libelo famoso intitulado «Notícia resumida dos acontecimentos da ilha Terceira na instalação do seu governo constitucional» (escrita em nome do filho)
