= Count of Barca =

The Count of Barca (Portuguese: Conde da Barca) is a noble title, created by Queen Maria I of Portugal, by decree dated 27 December 1815, in favour of António de Araújo e Azevedo.

== List of counts ==
1. António de Araújo e Azevedo, 1st Count of Barca (1754)
2. José Pedro Cyrne de Araújo de Azevedo Pimenta da Gama, 2nd Count of Barca (1899)

After the cessation of the monarchy, the title of Count of Barca was maintained by Maria da Assunção da Cunha e Menezes Pimenta da Gama, as pretender following 1944.
