= Viscount of Barrosa =

Viscount of Barrosa (Portuguese: Visconde da Barrosa) is a Portuguese title of nobility, created on July 9, 1892 by Carlos I, king of Portugal, for José Ribeiro Lima da Costa Azevedo, 1st Viscount of Barrosa (Barcelos, July 8, 1851 – Viana do Castelo, November 30, 1925), a prominent political figure in Viana do Castelo and local philanthropist.

The viscountship takes its name from Casa da Barrosa, an eighteenth-century manor house and estate inherited by the first holder's wife Antónia Ribeiro Lima in Vila Franca do Lima, Viana do Castelo.
