= António de Araújo e Azevedo, 1st Count of Barca =

Portuguese statesman (1754–1817)

His Excellency The Count of Barca KC FC
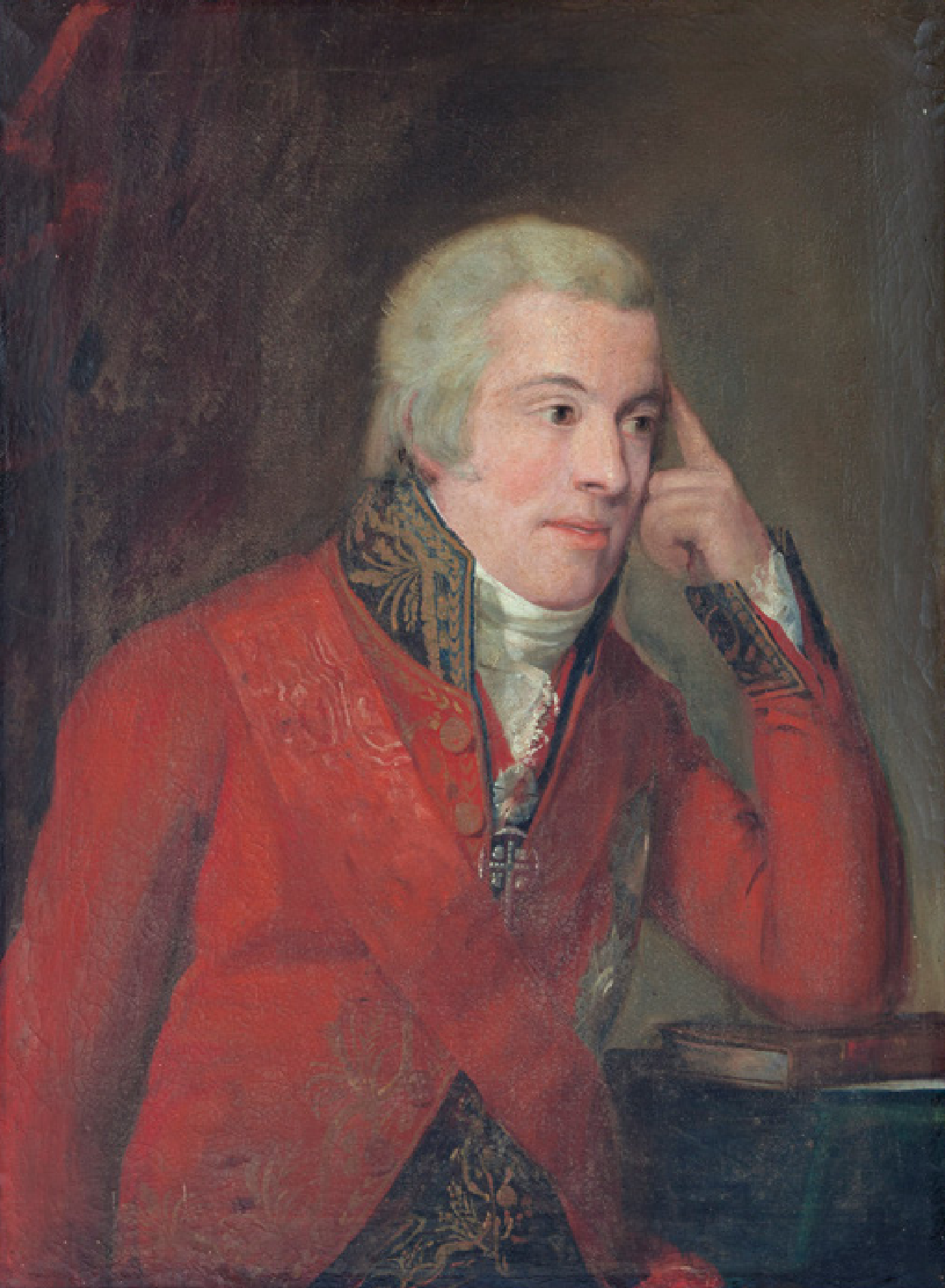

Secretary of State for Foreign Affairs and War
- In office 30 December 1816 – 21 June 1817
- Monarch: John VI
- Preceded by: Fernando José Portugal
- Succeeded by: João Paulo Bezerra

Personal details
- Born: 14 May 1754 Ponte de Lima, Kingdom of Portugal
- Died: 21 June 1817 (aged 63) Rio de Janeiro, United Kingdom of Portugal, Brazil and the Algarves
- Relatives: Francisco António de Araújo e Azevedo (brother)
- Occupation: Politician

D. António de Araújo e Azevedo, 1st Count of Barca (14 May 1754 – 21 June 1817) was a Portuguese statesman, author and amateur botanist.

== Biography ==
The eldest child of António Pereira Pinto de Araújo de Azevedo Fagundes and Marquesa Margarida de Araújo Azevedo, António de Araújo e Azevedo was born on 14 May 1754 in the freguesia of Santa Maria de Sá, Ponte de Lima, Portugal.

== Career ==
After cooperating in the establishment of the Academy of Sciences in Lisbon, he represented his government in Holland, France, Prussia, and Russia.

He was first minister of John VI of Portugal, whom he followed when the Portuguese Court was transferred to the colony of Brazil in 1807. There he was minister of the navy and foreign minister, and took great interest in promoting education and industry, having established the manufacture of porcelain in Rio de Janeiro.

He was a skeptic of free trade, arguing that opening up the Portuguese empire to free trade would "cause great ruin." During the French revolutionary wars, Azevedo was part of a pro-French faction within the Portuguese cabinet that clashed with a pro-British faction.

== Works ==
He conducted scientific studies and experiments in his own palace and private botanical garden, as well as the first trials for the acclimatization and culture of the tea-plant in Brazil. Later in life, he was the founder of Brazil's first school of fine arts.

As an author, his works include two tragedies and a translation of Virgil's pastorals.

== Sources ==
- Enciclopédia Luso-Brasileira (in Portuguese), vol. IV, Lisbon, Portugal, 1965
- Nobreza de Portugal e Brasil (in Portuguese), vol. III (II ed.), Lisbon, Portugal: Direcção de Afonso Eduardo Martins Zuquete/Editorial Enciclopédia, 1989, pp. 373–375
