= Thesouro de Nobreza =

1675 Portuguese manuscript

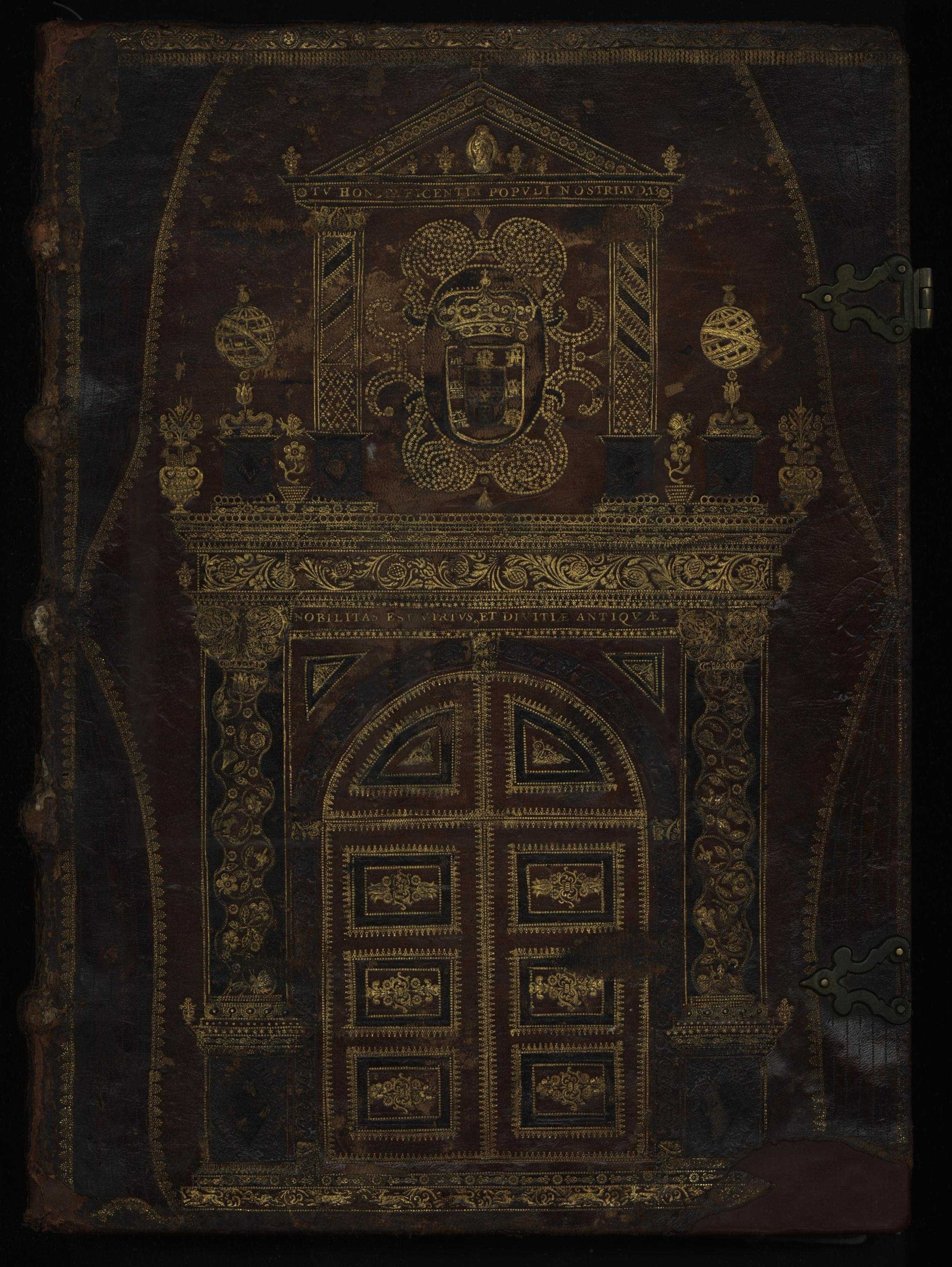
The decorated cover of the codex of Thesouro de Nobreza

Thesouro de Nobreza (translated: Treasure of Nobility) is a manuscript dated 1675, which was created during the reign of Afonso VI of Portugal, the twenty-second king of Portugal (a period when his brother, the future Pedro II of Portugal, ruled as Prince Regent). The work is an armorial, which is a collection of heraldic arms and was commissioned by Francisco Coelho, the King of Arms for Portuguese India, who appears on the title page.

== Overview ==
Coelho's manuscript unusually leaves all the verso of the folios blank. The complete title of the work is Tombo das Armas dos Reys e Titulares e de todas as Familias Nobres do Reyno de Portugal intitulado com o Nome de Thesouro de Nobreza (translated: Register of the Arms of the Kings and Titleholders and of all the Noble Families of the Kingdom of Portugal entitled with the Name of Treasure of Nobility). The codex of Thesouro de Nobreza contains 79 folios in parchment and paper, in the dimensions 480 x 350 mm. The manuscript is now in Lisbon, in the national archive of Torre do Tombo (reference Casa Real, Cartório da Nobreza, liv. 21).

The manuscript is considered a continuation of the important armorials executed by the initiative of Manuel I of Portugal: the Livro do Armeiro-Mor, by João do Cró (1509), and the Livro da Nobreza e Perfeiçam das Armas, by António Godinho (ca. 1521–1541). The first, besides being the oldest existing Portuguese armorial, is a masterpiece of heraldic illumination, with magnificent illuminations of great beauty; the second, although excluding much of the foreign arms that the other presents - including even entire chapters, such as the Nine Worthies - shows arms of families not represented in the older armorial, and adds something important to the Portuguese arms: the crests, which the Livro do Armeiro-Mor does not present.

Thesouro de Nobreza covers more topics than the Livro do Armeiro-Mor, including several innovations, such as the arms of the Twelve Tribes of Israel, the Military and Religious Orders, the cities and towns of Portugal, all the kings and queens of Portugal until then, and of the titled Houses of Portugal. In addition, it contains a considerably greater number of family arms. It is thus a more general and universal armorial than the Livro do Armeiro-Mor.

The manuscript was finished shortly after the end of the Portuguese Restoration War (1640–1668), during which numerous noble titles created by the kings of Spain were extinguished and new ones were created to reward the supporters of the Portuguese cause. One of the merits of Thesouro de Nobreza is that it reflects this evolution (see below).

Because it was completed when historians had many more sources than at the beginning of the 16th century, it has less historical value than the earlier armorials. The arms in Francisco Coelho's book are of a much more rudimentary execution than those of earlier armorials, which is why his work also has less artistic value. In addition to the coarse stroke, the lesser artistic note is accentuated by the fact that the arms of the families present only the respective shield, roundel, and crest, and never the helmet and mantling. The arms of the titled Houses present the shield and the respective heraldic crown. Having said this, the Thesouro de Nobreza does not fail to impress by the sheer quantity of arms and their diverse nature.

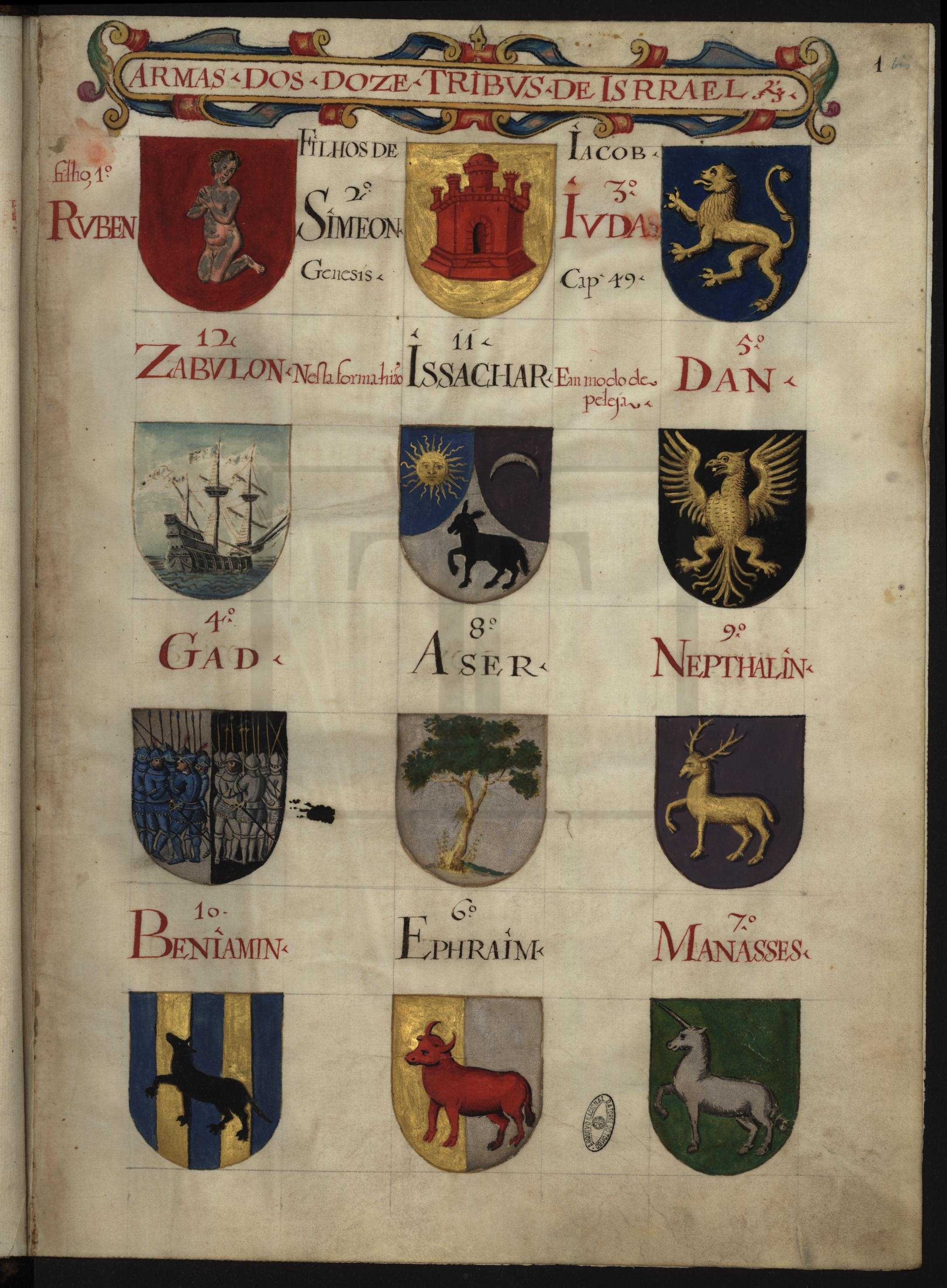
Arms of the Twelve Tribes of Israel (fl 1^{r})

== Details ==
=== Arms of the Nine Worthies ===
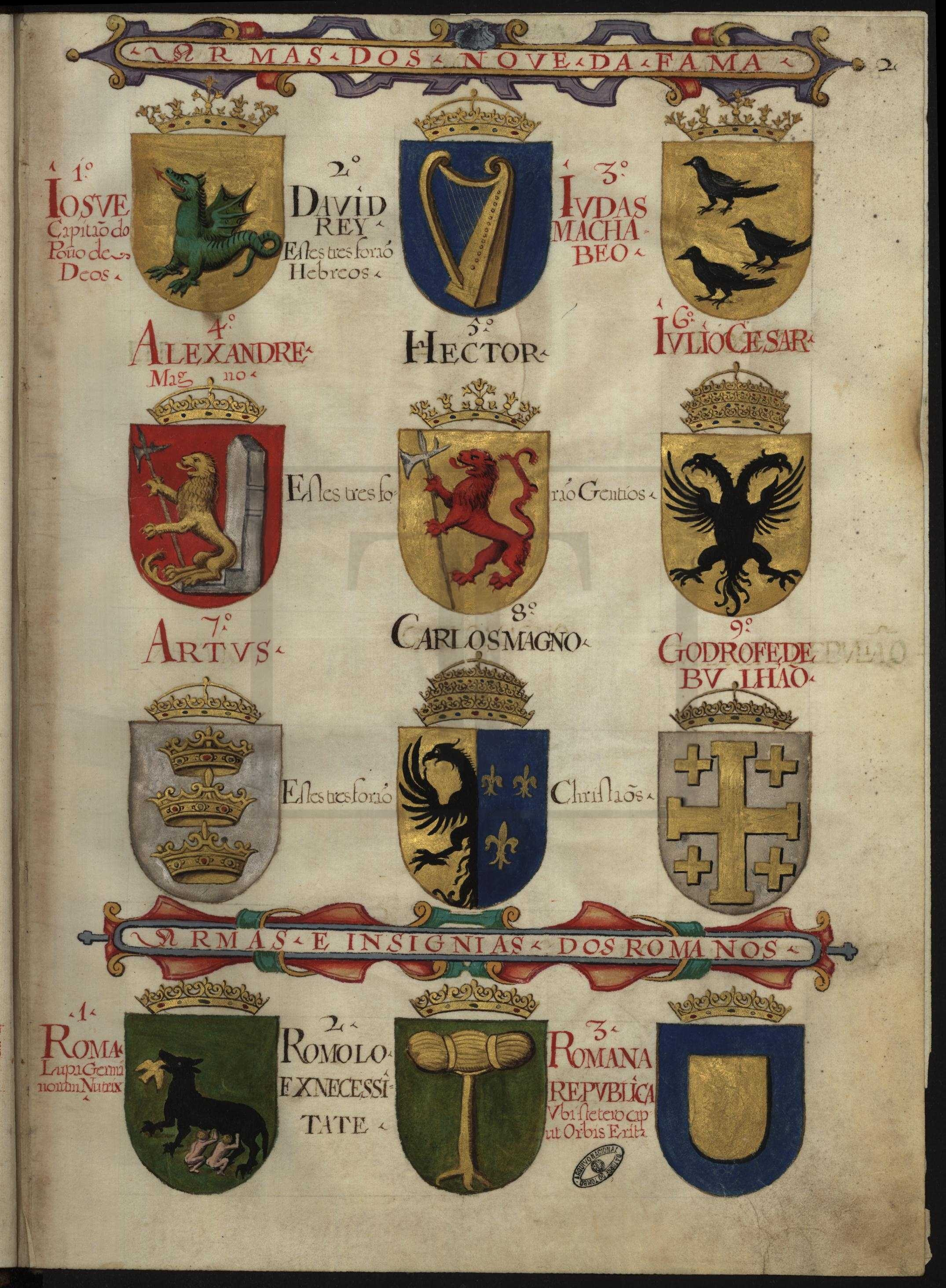
Arms of the Nine Worthies (fl 2^{r})

(Fl 2^{r}) The second chapter of the work shows the - almost all imaginary - arms of the so-called Nine Worthies, nine heroes considered in the Middle Ages as the ideal of the medieval knight. These are divided into three groups of three: the Hebrews, the Pagans (here called Gentiles), and the Christians. In Francisco Coelho's work, the order of presentation is identical to that seen in the Livro do Armeiro-Mor, which also dedicates a chapter to them:

- Joshua
- David
- Judas Maccabeus
- Alexander the Great
- Hector
- Julius Caesar
- King Arthur
- Charlemagne
- Godfrey of Bouillon

=== Arms and Insignia of the Romans ===
(Fl 3^{r}) Here is another interesting innovation in Francisco Coelho's work: twelve arms or insignia of the Roman Empire - some historical, others imaginary.

- Rome
- Romulus
- Roman Republic
- Ob Ferociam Militum
- Triumphus Non est Sine Sanguine
- Ob Signum Pacis
- Senatus Populusque Romanus
- Ob Imperii Decus
- Ob Animositate Romanorum
- Regere Imperio
- The Two States of the Church
- Phrygia

=== Arms of various Kingdoms ===
(Fl 3^{r}-6^{r}) The work proceeds with a list of arms of various kingdoms, in the manner of the two previous armorials. However, the list selected by Francisco Coelho is quite original, omitting many obvious kingdoms and including many that are not found in the other two works, as in the case of the first three on the list, Cilicia, Scythia, and Thrace. Among the chapters that the three armorials have in common, this is certainly the one in which the Thesouro de Nobreza stands out most for its originality.

=== Arms of some Lords and Potentates ===
(Fl 7^{r}) Here are shown twelve French arms, of which the first nine belong to nine of the former twelve peers of France (in 1675 there were already more than twenty), which all had an important role in the anointing of the kings of France. On the anointing of kings, the role of the peers, and illustrations see the Livro do Armeiro-Mor. Note that the armorial of 1509 correctly presents the arms of the peers of France after the seven Prince-electors of the Empire (see below), their superiors in the noble hierarchy. The reason why Francisco Coelho in 1675 would have chosen to present the French arms before the German ones may reflect the recent relations between Portugal and France since the final phase of the Portuguese Restoration War (1640–1668). Note that since 1668 the Prince Regent was married to a French princess, the future queen Maria Francisca of Savoy, after her marriage to Afonso VI of Portugal had been annulled. Similarly, the Duke of Cadaval, Nuno Álvares Pereira de Melo, 1st Duke of Cadaval, the first nobleman of the kingdom, had himself married in Paris also to a French princess in 1671 - and precisely in 1675, after being widowed, he married again in France to another princess, a relative of Louis XIV. The relations between Portugal and France at the date of the work's execution were thus excellent. On this theme, and for a fantastic testimony of the era in which Francisco Coelho carried out his work, see the work of Ana Maria Homem Leal de Faria. See also comment in the chapter on the queens of Portugal.

=== Arms of the Seven Electors of the Empire ===
(Fl 8^{r}) This chapter represents the arms of the seven Prince-electors of the Holy Roman Empire. The chapter reflects a change since 1509, when they were represented by João do Cró: due to the Thirty Years' War (1618–1648), the Electoral Palatinate, which had passed to the Protestant party, was in 1623 replaced by Bavaria, whose prince had remained faithful to the Catholic party. On the election of the emperor, the offices of the various electors, and illustrations see the Livro do Armeiro-Mor.

=== Arms of the Military & Religious Orders of Portugal ===
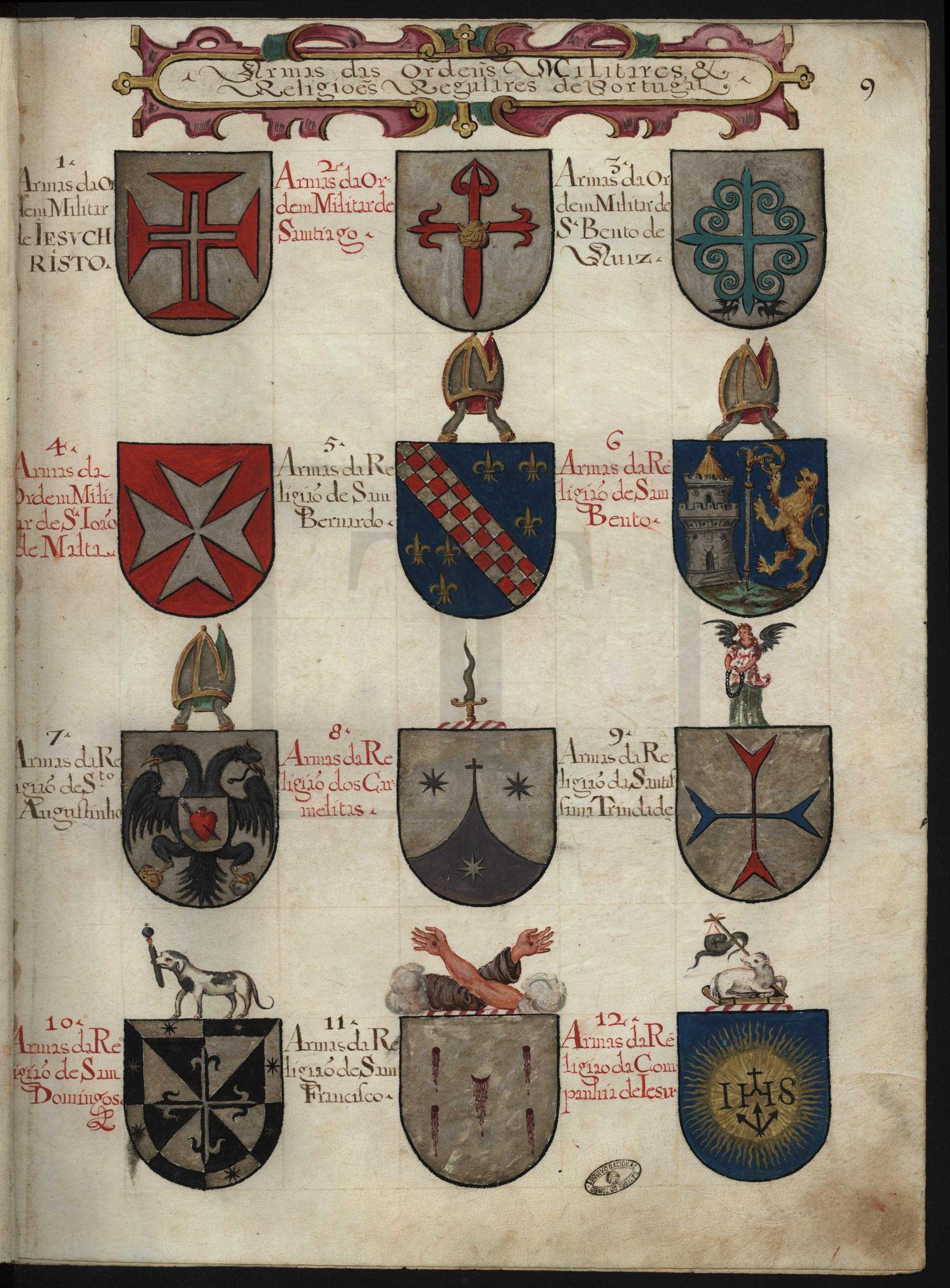
Arms of the Military and Religious Orders of Portugal (fl 9^{r})

(Fl 9^{r}-10^{r}) This chapter is another innovation in relation to the previous armorials. Occupying an entire folio and the first row of the next one we find represented fifteen (sixteen) military and monastic orders:

- Military Order of Christ
- Military Order of Santiago
- Military Order of Saint Benedict of Aviz
- Military Order of Saint John of Malta
- Order of Cister (Religion of St. Bernard)
- Order of Saint Benedict (Religion of St. Benedict)
- Order of Saint Augustine (Religion of St. Augustine)
- Carmelites (Religion of the Carmelites)
- Order of the Most Holy Trinity (Religion of the Most Holy Trinity)
- Dominican Order (Religion of St. Dominic)
- Order of Friars Minor (Religion of St. Francis)
- Society of Jesus
- Canons Regular of Saint John Evangelist (Religion of St. Eloi)
- Order of Saint Jerome (Religion of St. Jerome)
- Brothers Hospitallers of Saint John of God (Religion of St. John of God)
- Carthusians (Religion of the Carthusian Order of St. Bruno) (these are found in the next chapter, where they were probably inserted to save space).

=== Arms of some Cities of the Conquests of Portugal ===
(Fl 9^{r}) Another original chapter in Francisco Coelho's work: eight arms of the conquests of Portugal - three arms of the Algarve; the arms of Brazil and Goa; those of the islands of São Miguel and Terceira in the Azores; and those of the "Island of Funchal." Among them all we also find the arms of the Carthusian Order. One of the Algarve shields is not filled.

=== Arms of the Cities of Portugal ===
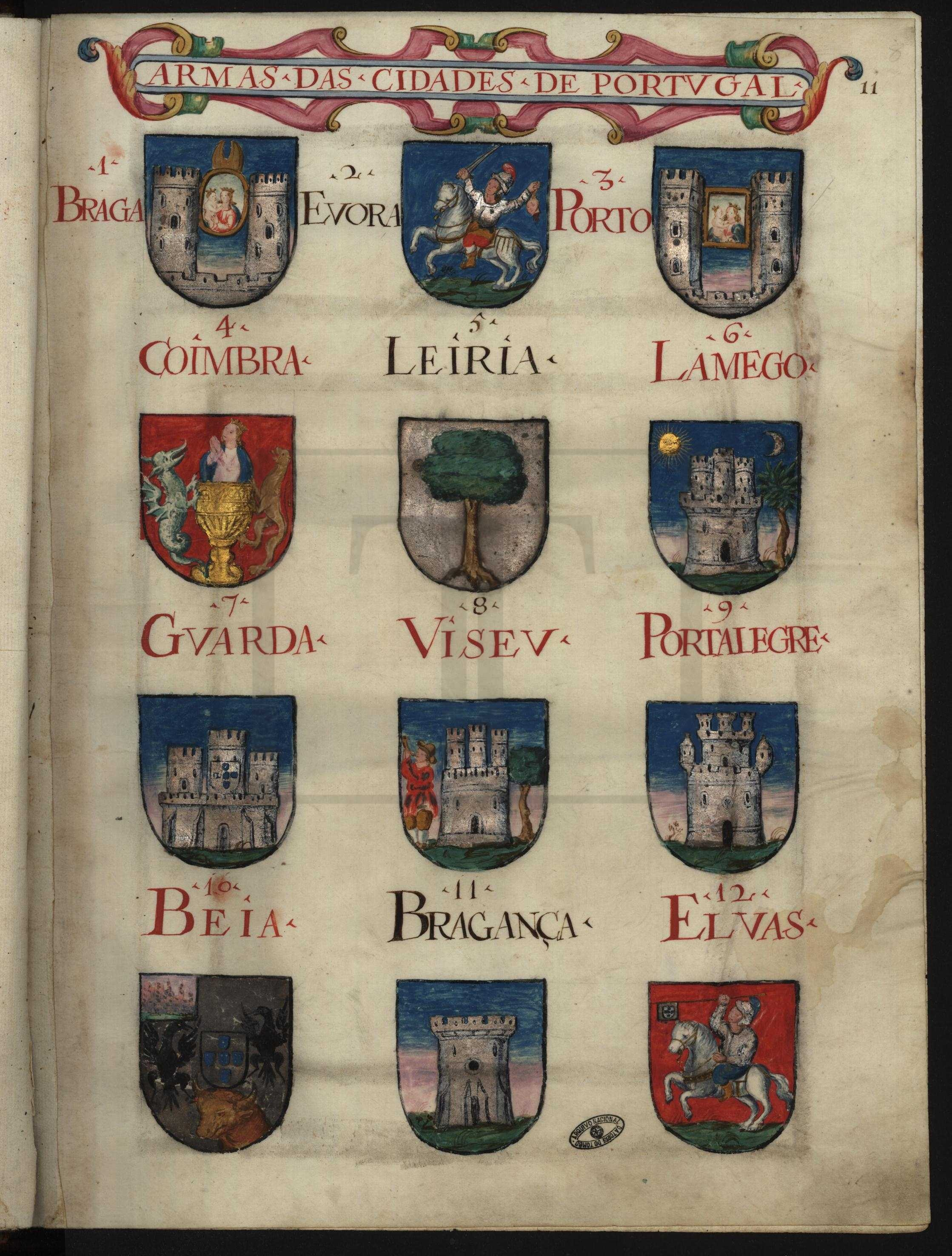
Arms of the Cities of Portugal (fl 11^{r})

(Fl 11^{r}) A folio with the then twelve cities of Portugal:

- Braga
- Évora
- Porto
- Coimbra
- Leiria
- Lamego
- Guarda
- Viseu
- Portalegre, Portugal
- Beja
- Bragança, Portugal
- Elvas

=== Arms of the Towns of Portugal that have Seat in the Cortes ===
(Fl 12^{r}-18^{r}) This chapter of the Thesouro da Nobreza occupies six entire folios and three rows of a seventh and contains the arms of 75 Portuguese towns. These were the ones that according to their charters had the right to representation ("seat") in the Cortes of the Kingdom, and which are still today mostly the main towns of Portugal, most of them municipal seats. Seven of the shields have a caption, but are blank: those of the towns of Loulé, Castelo Rodrigo, Alegrete, Fronteira, Veiros (Estremoz), Campo Maior, and Monsaraz. The last folio of the chapter contains twelve shields, but only the top three have been filled, the rest being blank and without caption. Note that this chapter includes the arms of Olivenza, whose status today is controversial (see Disputed status of Olivenza). Olivenza is represented in sixth place, right after some of the most important towns in Portugal: Santarém, Setúbal, Tomar (seat of the Order of Christ), Guimarães, and Estremoz, all of which have since been elevated to city status.

=== Arms of the Kings of Portugal ===
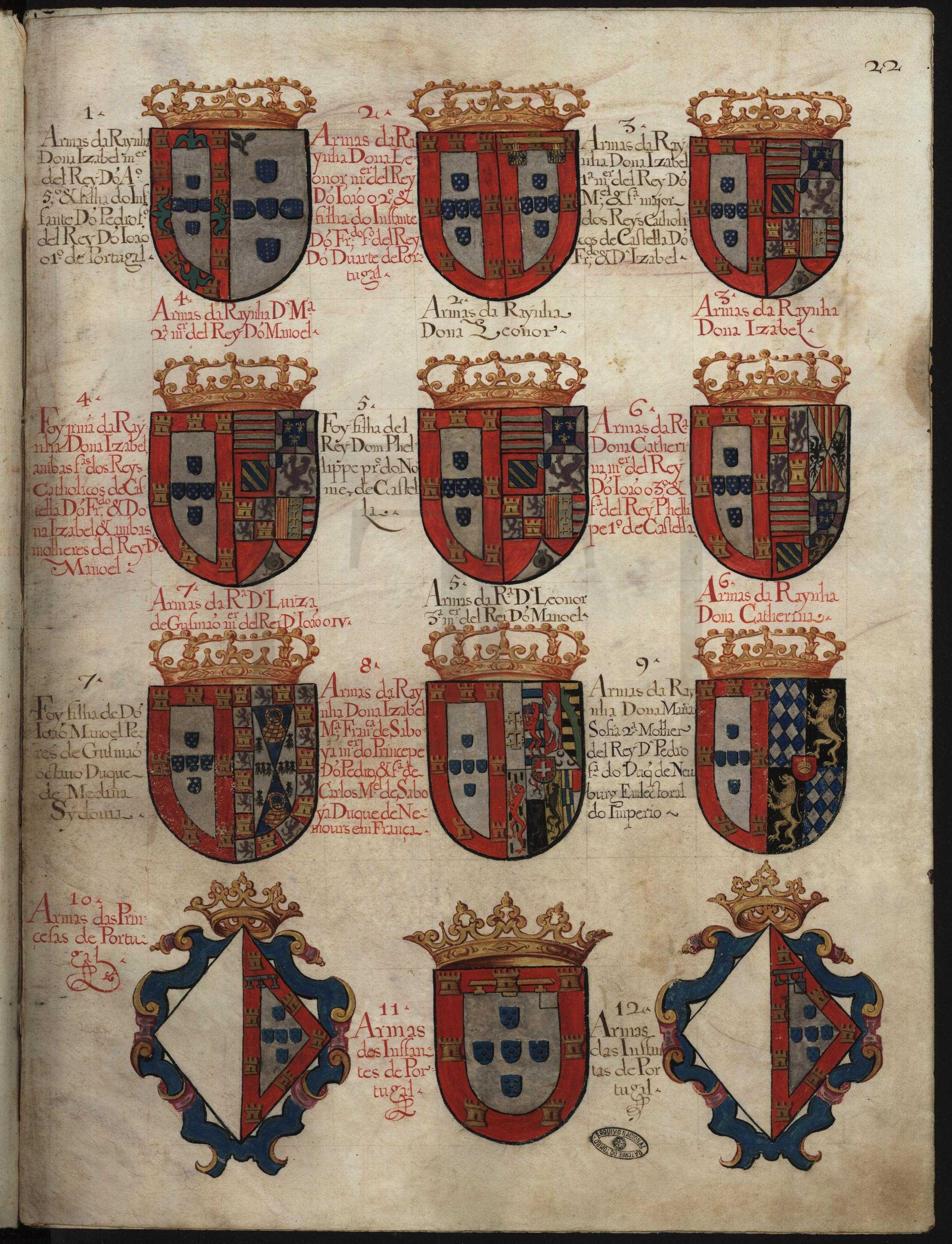
Arms of the Queens (fl 22^{r}). In the last row the arms of the Princesses and Infantas of Portugal, in lozenge. Note the arms of Queen Maria Sophia of Neuburg in the last place, executed already after 1687 (see below).

(Fl 19^{r}-20^{r}) Topped by the arms of the city of Lisbon and Count Henry we have in two folios the list of all the Portuguese monarchs up to 1675:

- Afonso I of Portugal - 1st King of Portugal
- Sancho I of Portugal
- Afonso II of Portugal - called the Fat
- Sancho II of Portugal - Was the 2nd of the Name, and they called him the Capell
- Afonso III of Portugal - Was the third of the Name, & Count of Boulogne in France
- Denis of Portugal - was called the Liberal
- Afonso IV of Portugal - Was the fourth of the name, & called the Brave
- Peter I of Portugal - was the 1st of the Name & called the Cruel
- Ferdinand I of Portugal - Was called the Negligent
- John I of Portugal - Was called of good Memory & the 1st of the name
- Edward - Was a great favorer of the Learned
- Afonso V of Portugal - Was the fifth of the Name & called the African
- John II of Portugal - Was the 2nd of the Name
- Manuel I of Portugal - Was the one who ordered the discovery of the East Indies
- John III of Portugal - Was called the Father of theFatherland & the third of the Name
- Sebastian, King of Portugal - Was the one who got lost in Africa
- Henry - Was Cardinal
- John IV of Portugal - Was Restorer of the Kingdom of Portugal and the fourth of the Name

The chapter closes with the arms of the Prince of Portugal, the Duke of Braganza, and the Duke of Aveiro, all of royal blood.

=== Arms of the Queens of Portugal ===
(Fl 21^{r}-22^{r}) After the kings of Portugal, Francisco Coelho's work presents in two folios the arms of their wives the queens, all with shields divided of Portugal and the arms of their fathers. An interesting detail: the last queen to appear in the chapter is the German Maria Sophia of Neuburg, second wife of Pedro II. However, this princess in 1675, when the work was finished, was only six years old. Pedro only became a widower in the last days of 1683, and only married Maria Sophia in 1687, when he was already king, so these arms were executed already after the rest of the book.

=== Arms of the Dukes and Marquises of Portugal ===
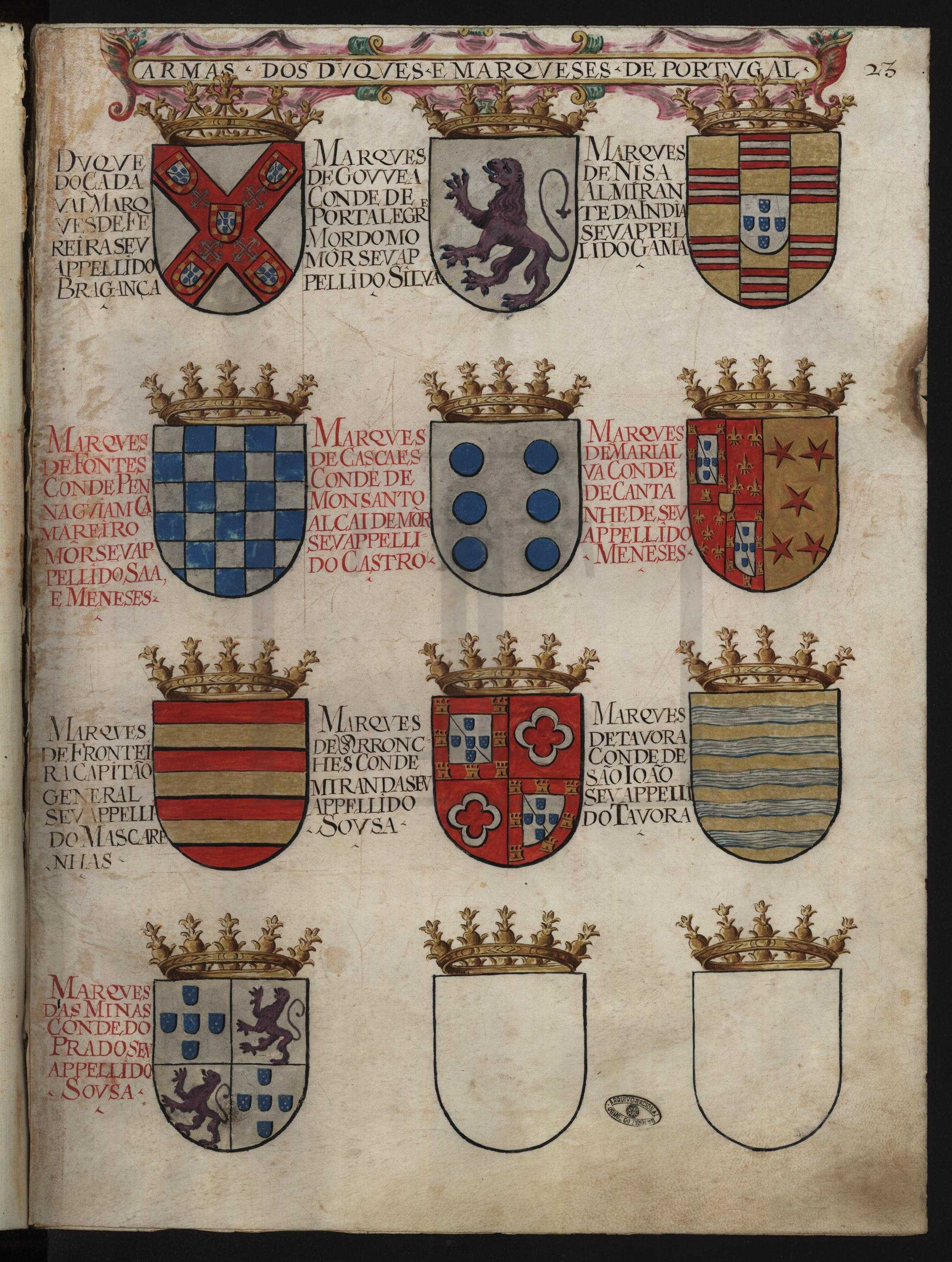
Arms of the Dukes and Marquises of Portugal (fl 23^{r})

(Fl 23^{r}) The Thesouro de Nobreza now reaches the body of the work: the arms of the Titleholders and of all the Noble Families of the Kingdom of Portugal, beginning with the top titles of the Portuguese noble hierarchy of that time. Note that during the Portuguese Restoration War (1640–1668) and in the years immediately following, 24 titles granted by the Philips were extinguished, and 17 new ones created. From then on, the number of titles in Portugal remained extraordinarily stable in the European context for about a century and a half, until the end of the 18th century: about fifty. In 1640 there were 56 titles; in 1789, 54. New noble titles were conferred at roughly the same rate that old titles were extinguished - on average about four every four years. Many of these lineages were described by Anselmo Braamcamp Freire in his Brasões da Sala de Sintra. For the late medieval period, see the works of Rita Costa Gomes and José Augusto Sotto Mayor Pizarro in the bibliography.

- Duke of Cadaval, Marquis of Ferreira (Braganza)
- Marquis of Gouveia, Count of Portalegre, Mordomo-Mor (Silva)
- Marquis of Nisa, Admiral of India (Gama)
- Marquis of Fontes, Count of Penaguião, Camareiro-Mor (Sá e Meneses)
- Marquis of Cascais, Count of Monsanto, Alcaide-Mor (Castro)
- Marquis of Marialva, Count of Cantanhede (Meneses)
- Marquis of Fronteira, Captain-General (Mascarenhas)
- Marquis of Arronches, Count of Miranda do Corvo (Sousa)
- Marquis of Távora, Count of São João (Távora)
- Marquis of Minas, Count of Prado (Sousa)

=== Arms of the Counts of Portugal ===
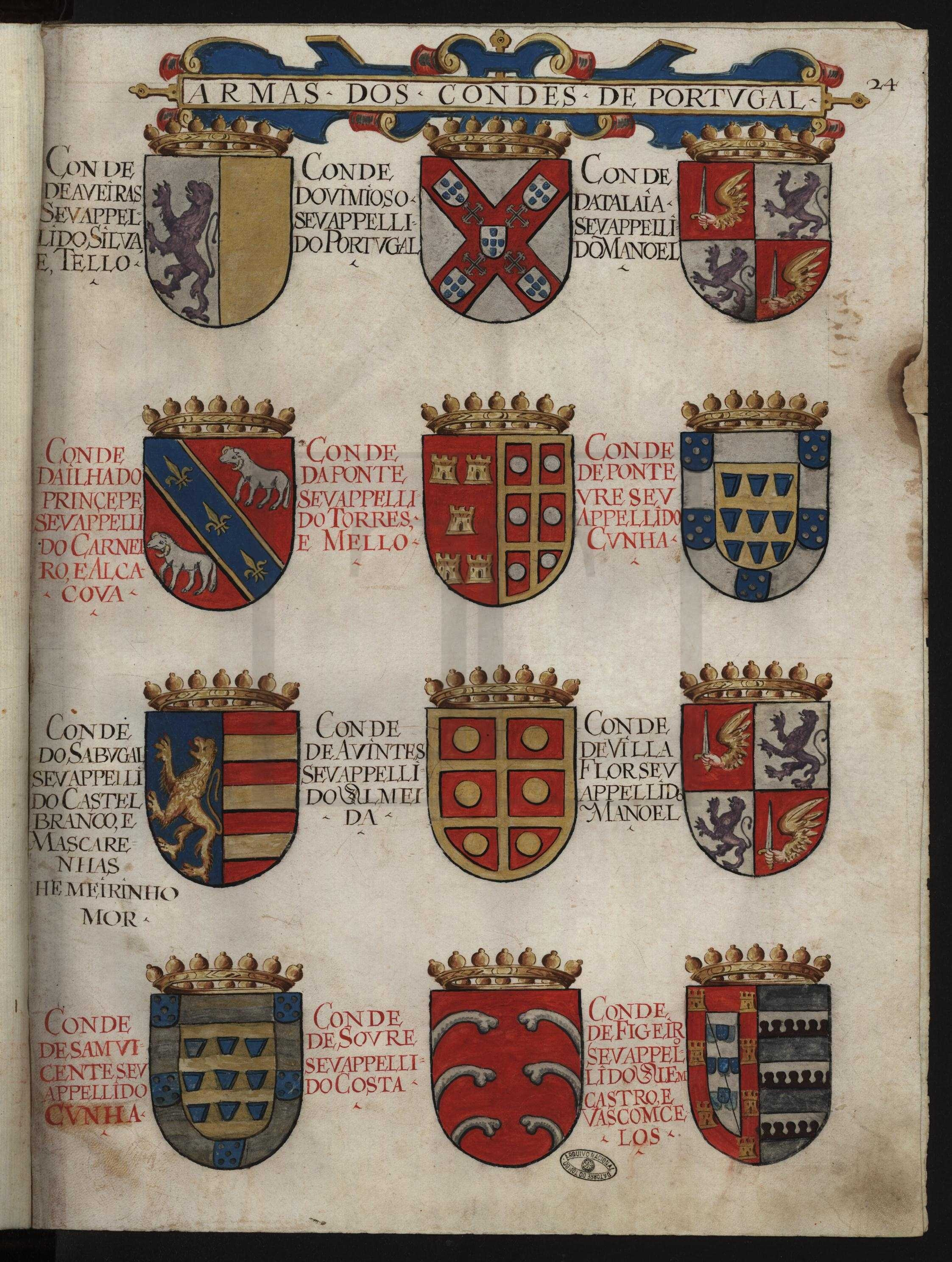
Arms of the Counts of Portugal (fl 24^{r})

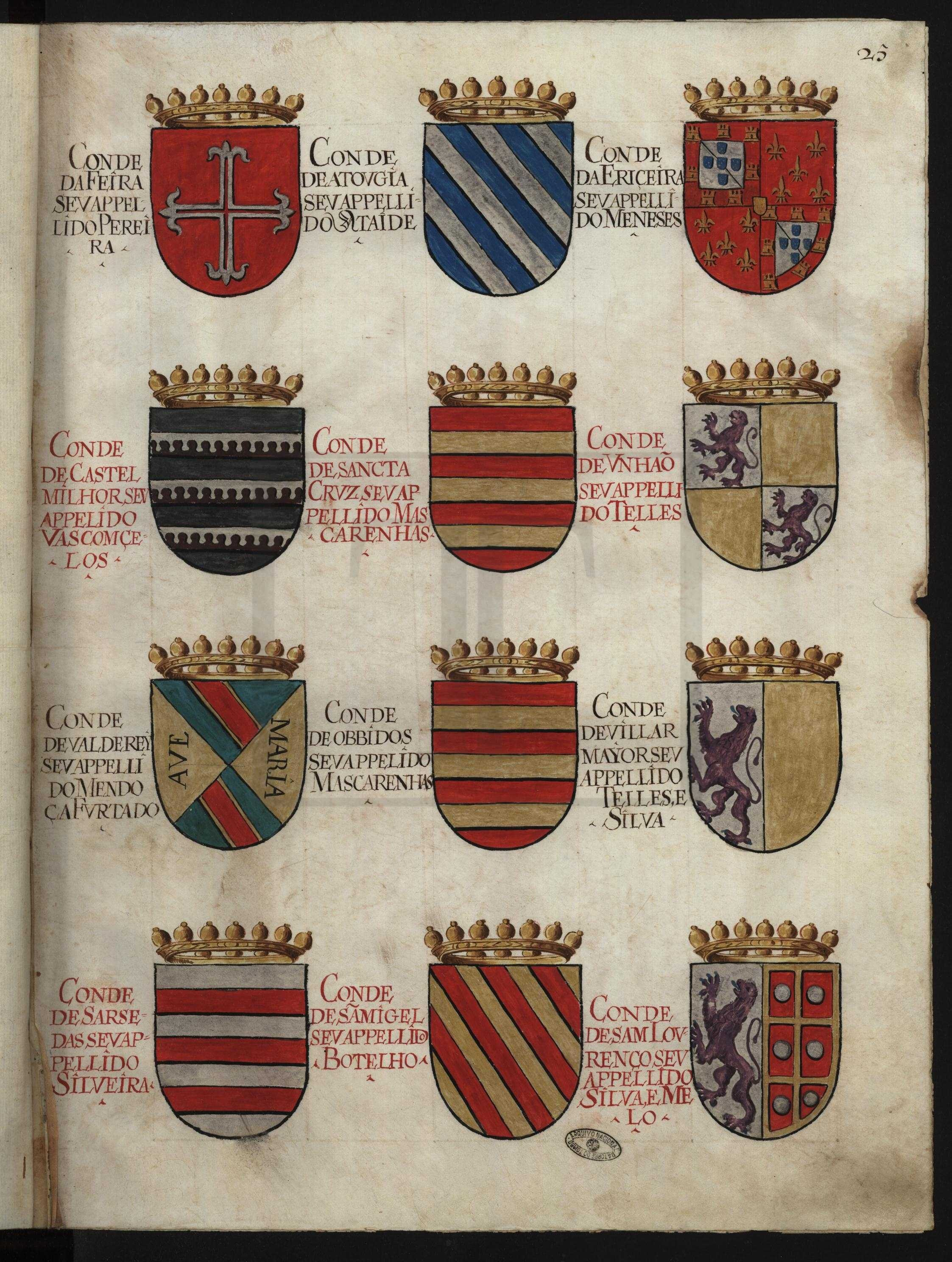
Arms of the Counts of Portugal (fl 25^{r})

(Fl 24^{r}-26^{r}) After the arms of the dukes and marquises, this chapter presents the arms of almost all the Portuguese counties existing in 1675.

- Count of Aveiras (Silva e Telo)
- Count of Vimioso (Portugal)
- Count of Atalaia (Manuel)
- Count of Ilha do Príncipe (Carneiro)
- Count of Ponte (Torres e Melo)
- Count of Pontével (Cunha )
- Count of Sabugal, Meirinho-Mor (Castelo-Branco e Mascarenhas)
- Count of Avintes (Almeida)
- Count of Vila Flor (Manuel)
- Count of São Vicente (Cunha)
- Count of Soure (Costa)
- Count of Figueiró (Lencastre e Vasconcelos)
- Count of Feira (Pereira)
- Count of Atouguia (Ataíde)
- Count of Ericeira (Meneses)
- Count of Castelo Melhor (Vasconcelos)
- Count of Santa Cruz (Mascarenhas)
- Count of Unhão (Teles)
- Count of Vale de Reis (Mendoça Furtado)
- Count of Óbidos (Mascarenhas)
- Count of Vilar Maior (Teles e Silva)
- Count of Sarzedas (Silveira)
- Count of São Miguel (Botelho)
- Count of São Lourenço (Silva e Melo)
- Count of Castanheira (Ataíde)
- Count of Vila Verde (Noronha)
- Count of Coculim (Mascarenhas)
- Count of Pombeiro (Castelo-Branco)
- Count of Vidigueira (Gama)
- Viscount of Vila Nova de Cerveira (Lima, Brito e Nogueira)
- Count of Oriola and Baron of Alvito (Lobo)
- Count of Arcos (Noronha)
- Count of Ribeira Grande (Câmara)
- Count of São Tiago, Aposentador-Mor (Silva e Sousa)
- Count of São Vicente (Távora)

Note however that the following titles are presented in the next chapter:

- Count of Vimioso (Portugal)
- Count of Faro (Faro)
- Count of Tarouca (Meneses)
- Count of Redondo (Coutinho)

=== Arms of the Families ===
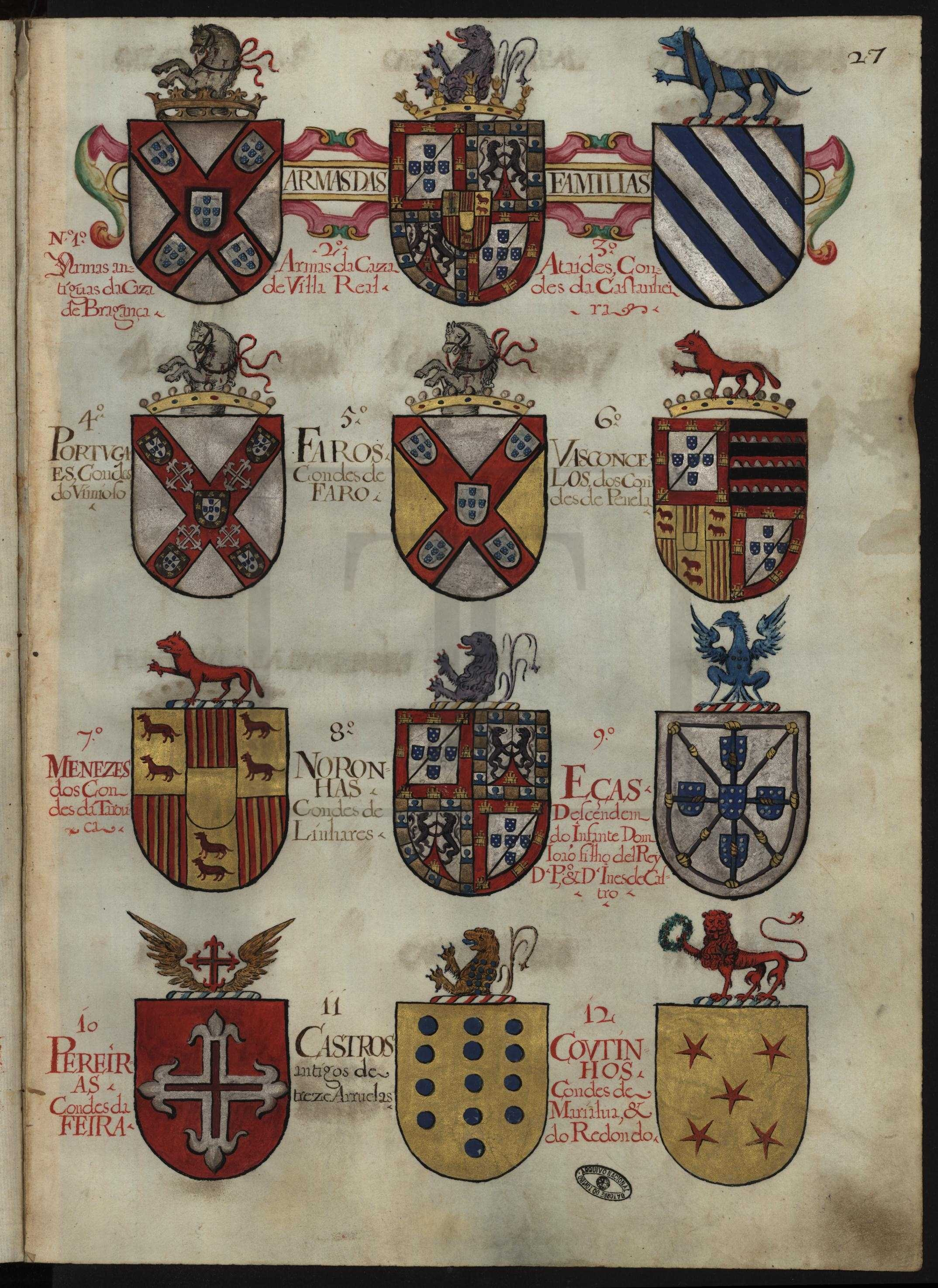
Arms of the Families (fl 27^{r}). The first of forty folios presenting arms of Portuguese families.

The final chapter of the Thesouro da Nobreza presents, starting from folio 27, forty folios with arms of Portuguese noble families, all with the verso blank. The chapter includes almost all the family arms present in the Livro do Armeiro-Mor and in the Livro da Nobreza e Perfeiçam das Armas, and also those of many other families ennobled in the meantime. The chapter generally follows the order of presentation of the previous armorials, with the oldest and most important lineages first - including four titles of count not mentioned in the previous chapter, and also two titles extinct in 1675 (that of Count of Penela and that of Count of Linhares). Folio 66 presents only four arms, so the total of Portuguese family arms in this chapter of the Thesouro de Nobreza is 472.

== Digitized version ==
The National Archive of Torre do Tombo, on its website, provides digitized photographs of the Thesouro de Nobreza in TIFF format (see External Links).

== Gallery ==
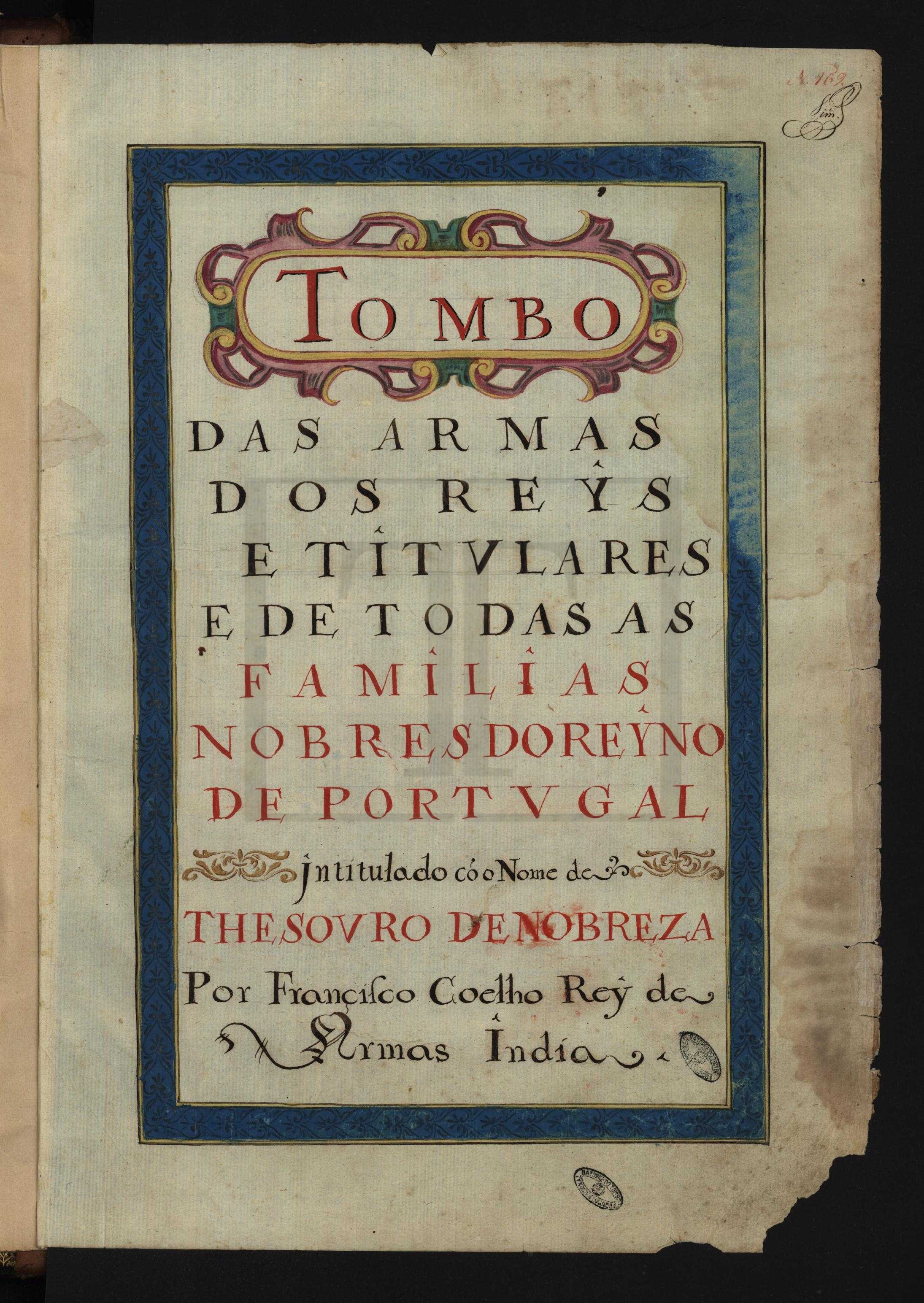
Title Page (fl -2^{r})

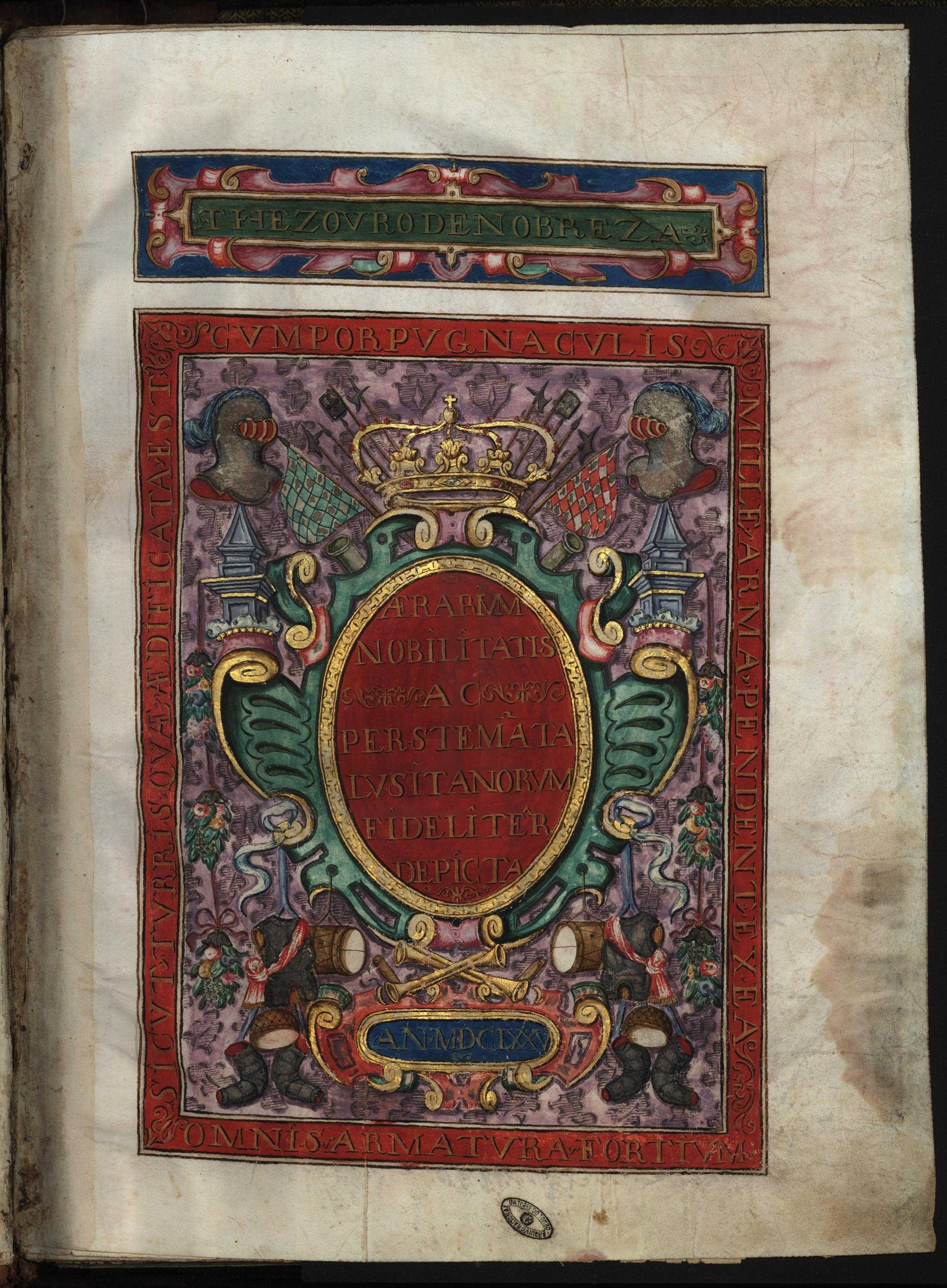
Frontispiece (fl -2^{r})

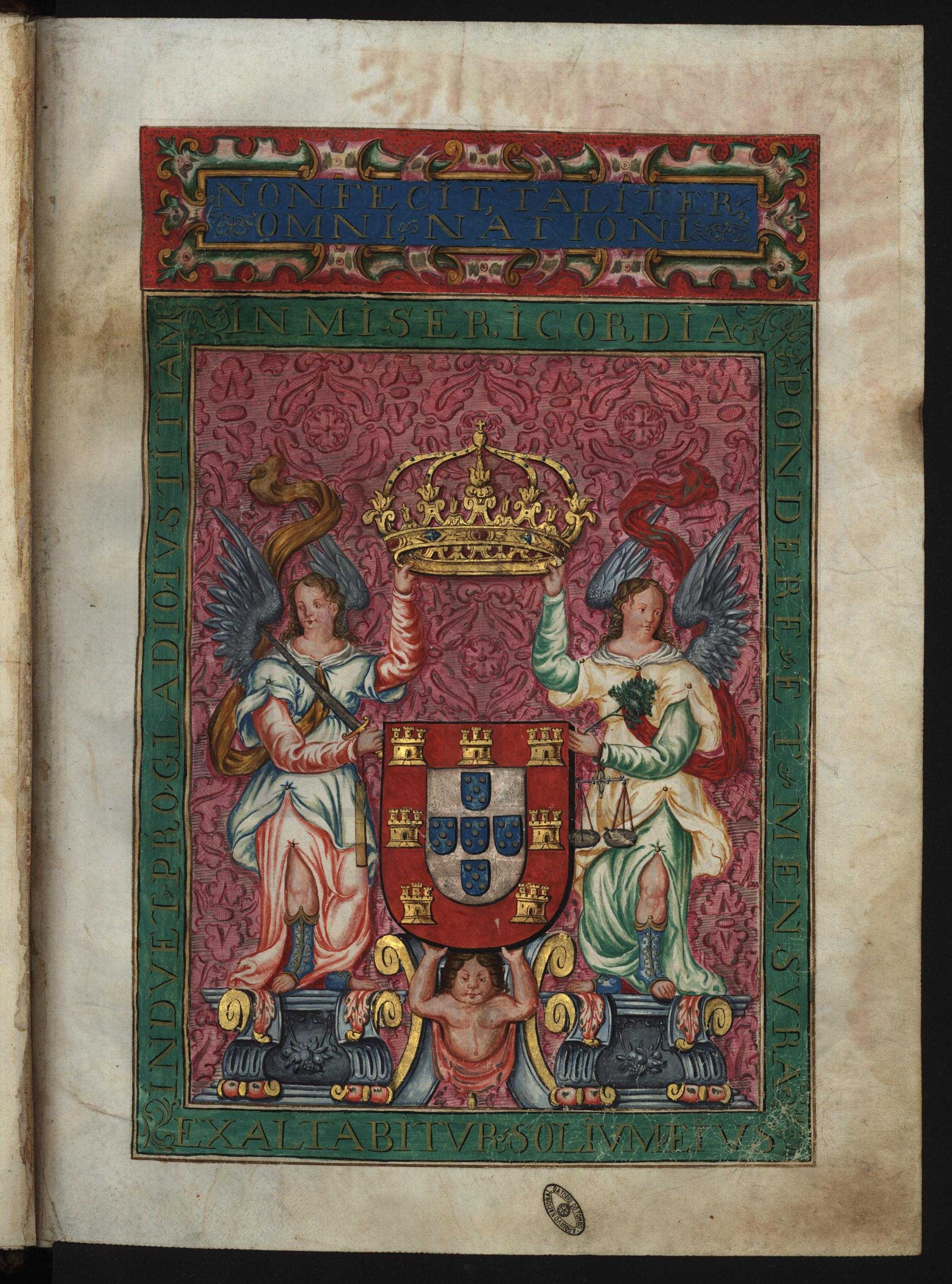
Frontispiece (fl -1^{r})

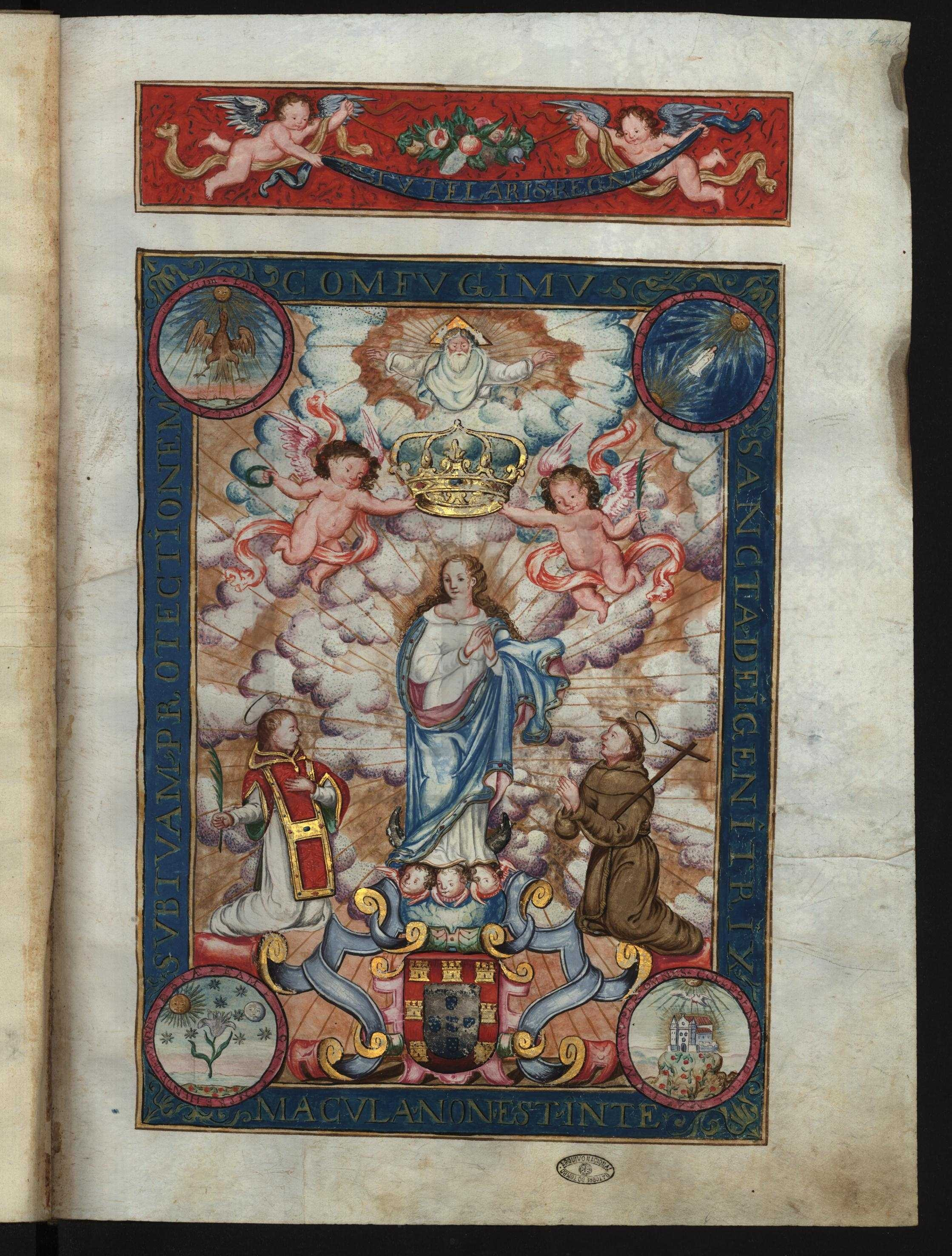
Our Lady over the Arms of Portugal (fl int-20-21)

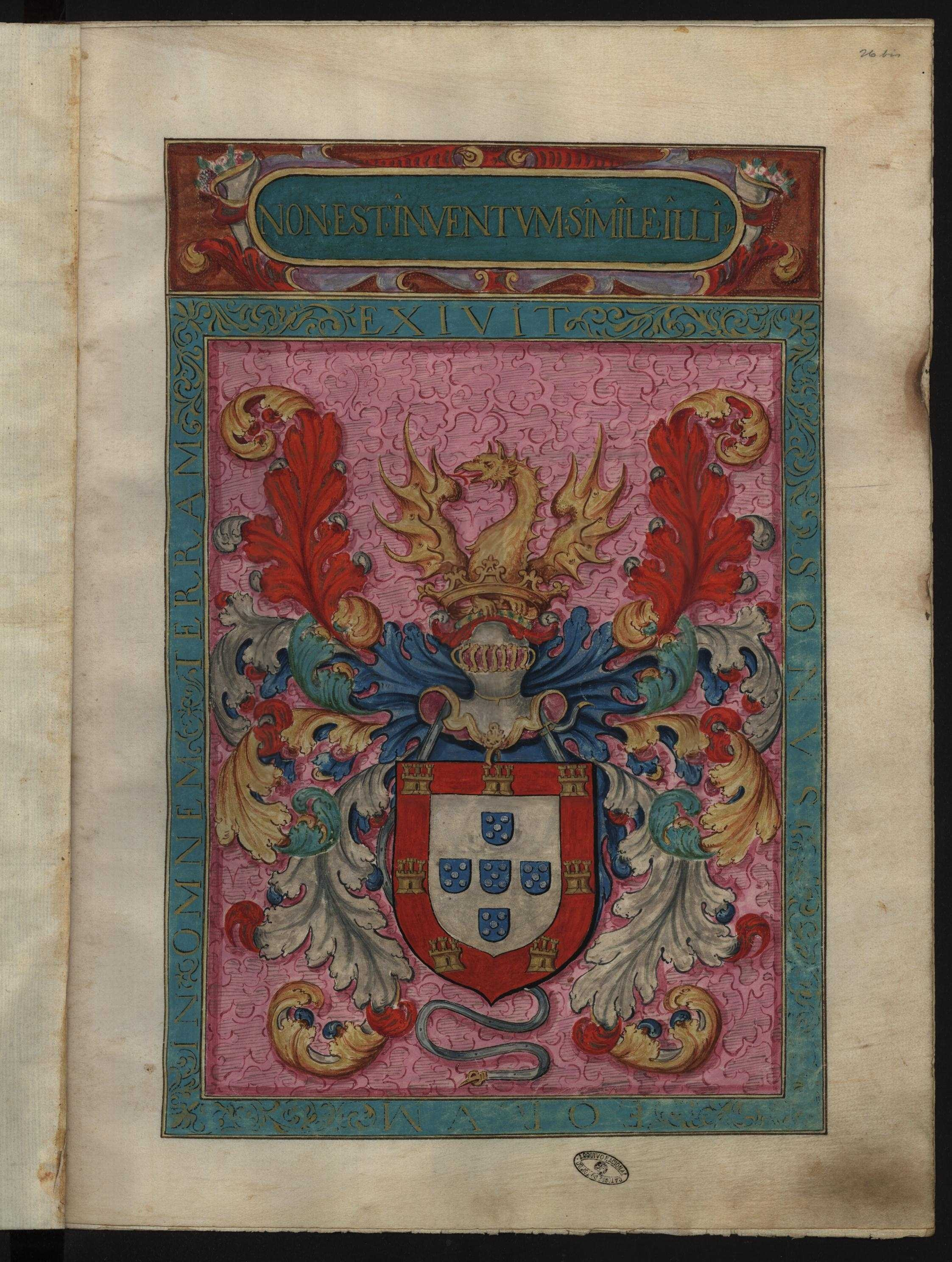
Arms of Portugal (fl int-26-27)

== See also ==
- Livro do Armeiro-Mor

== Bibliography ==
- Livro da Nobreza e Perfeiçam das Armas (António Godinho, 16th century). Facsimile of MS. 164 of the Casa Forte of the National Archive of Torre do Tombo. Introduction and Notes by Martim Albuquerque and João Paulo de Abreu e Lima. Edições Inapa, 1987
- Livro do Armeiro-Mor (1509). 2nd edition. Preface by Joaquim Veríssimo Serrão; Presentation by Vasco Graça Moura; Introduction, Brief History, Description and Analysis by José Calvão Borges. Portuguese Academy of History/Edições Inapa, 2007
- FARIA, Ana Maria Homem Leal de: Duarte Ribeiro de Macedo. Um Diplomata Moderno (1618-1680). Doctoral Dissertation. Diplomatic Institute, Ministry of Foreign Affairs (Lisbon), 2005.
- Idem: Os Cadernos de Duarte Ribeiro de Macedo. Correspondência Diplomática de Paris (1668-1676). Diplomatic Institute, Ministry of Foreign Affairs (Lisbon), 2007.
- FREIRE, Anselmo Braamcamp: Brasões da Sala de Sintra. 3 Vols. 3rd Edition, National Press-Mint, 1996
- GOMES, Rita Costa: The Making of a Court Society. Kings and Nobles in late Medieval Portugal. Cambridge University Press, 2003
- MONTEIRO, Nuno Gonçalo: "17th and 18th-century Portuguese Nobility in the European Context: A historiographical overview". e-Journal of Portuguese History, Vol. 1, number 1, Summer 2003
- PIZARRO, José Augusto Sotto Mayor: Linhagens Medievais Portuguesas: Genealogias e Estratégias 1279-1325, vol. I-III. Universidade Moderna do Porto, 1999
