= List of marquisates in Portugal =

Noble titles of Portugal
Dukedoms of Portugal
Marquisates of Portugal
Countships of Portugal
Viscountcies of Portugal
Baronies of Portugal

This is a list of marquisates created in the Kingdom of Portugal.

== History ==
=== Origins ===
The title of Marquis occupies, in the Portuguese noble hierarchy, the position immediately below that of Duke. Like the dukedom, it was originally reserved for close relatives of the royal family, above all for branches of the House of Braganza.

The first marquisate created in Portugal was that of Valença, granted on 11 June 1451 by Afonso V to Dom Afonso of Braganza, 4th Count of Ourém and heir to the Dukedom of Braganza.

In the 15th and 16th centuries, the noble families of the first rank gradually rose to the comital dignity. In the 17th and 18th centuries, the countships of these families were progressively raised to marquisates, as a rule under titles different from the original ones, with the titles of Count traditionally coming to be used by the heirs of the marquises.

=== Status ===
All marquises in Portugal held Grandeeship by virtue of their rank; that is, they were Grandees of the Realm.

On the creation of the title, or by a later grant, some marquises were granted Honours of Kinship with the Royal House, with the style of Nephew or Cousin of the King, and were therefore known as kinsman-marquises. These took precedence over the other Grandees of the Realm, regardless of the rank or seniority of their titles, ranking in protocol immediately after the kinsman-dukes.

Marquises de juro e herdade (by hereditary right) take precedence over the others, after which general precedence follows the seniority of the title.

=== 19th century and the Republic ===
From the 19th century onwards, following the establishment of the liberal regime, the marquisate, like the other titles of nobility, came to be granted mainly as a reward for services rendered to the nation, including to foreign military officers in the service of Portugal, such as Arthur Wellesley, 1st Marquis of Torres Vedras, and William Carr Beresford, 1st Marquis of Campo Maior.

With the establishment of the Republic in 1910, titles of nobility ceased to be recognised by the State, although their use continued in a private capacity, as did the genealogical representation of the respective houses.

== Classes ==
Portuguese titles of Marquis are divided into the following types, ranked in the noble hierarchy as follows:

No.	Precedence	Type	Transmission	Description	Examples
1st	Marquisates with Honours of Kinship	With Honours of Kinship	According to the underlying title	A distinction added to hereditary or life titles, conferring on the holder the style of a relative of the Royal House and precedence over the other Grandees of the Realm, immediately after the kinsman-dukes.	Angeja, Valença, Abrantes, Lavradio
2nd	Marquisates de juro e herdade	De juro e herdade	Hereditary	Titles of noble families, transmissible to the holder's heirs without the need for a new grant.	Vila Viçosa, Marialva, Fronteira, Pombal
3rd	Marquisates for successive lives	For a limited number of lives	Hereditary for a fixed number of lives	A title granted for a specified number of successors, becoming extinct once the lives provided for in the grant were exhausted.	Castelo Rodrigo
4th	Life marquisates	For life	Non-hereditary	Conferred as a reward or tribute to an individual, not passing automatically to their heirs, although the grant was frequently renewed in favour of their successors.	Alegrete, Tomar, Soveral

In total, 90 titles of marquis were created in Portugal. (Note: This figure counts distinct grants rather than distinct names: the titles of Valença, Torres Novas and Gouveia were each created twice, so there are 87 distinct names.)

== Marquisates ==
=== Marquises with Honours of Kinship ===
The following marquisates enjoyed Honours of Kinship, occupying in the noble hierarchy the position immediately below the dukedoms and taking precedence over the other marquisates. They were de juro e herdade in nature.

Coat of arms	Title	Created	First holder	Current claimant under the Republic	Ref.
Philip III (1621–1640)
	Marquis of Gouveia (1st creation)	20 January 1625	Dom Manrique da Silva, Lord High Steward of the Realm and 6th Count of Portalegre	Extinct (1759)	
John V (1706–1750)
	Marquis of Angeja	21 January 1714	Dom Pedro António de Meneses Noronha de Albuquerque, 2nd Count of Vila Verde	Extinct	
	Marquis of Valença (2nd creation)	10 March 1716	Dom Francisco de Portugal, 8th Count of Vimioso	Fernando Patrício de Portugal de Sousa Coutinho	
	Marquis of Abrantes	24 June 1718	Dom Rodrigo Anes de Sá Almeida e Meneses, 3rd Marquis of Fontes	José Maria da Piedade de Lancastre e Távora	
Joseph I (1750–1777)
	Marquis of Lavradio	18 October 1753	Dom António de Almeida Soares Portugal, 1st Count of Lavradio	Jaime Roque de Pinho de Almeida	

=== Marquises de juro e herdade ===
Coat of arms	Title	Created	First holder	Current claimant under the Republic	Ref.
Afonso V (1438–1481)
	Marquis of Valença (1st creation; first marquisate granted in Portugal)	11 June 1451	Dom Afonso of Braganza, 4th Count of Ourém and heir to the Dukedom of Braganza	Extinct (1460)	
	Marquis of Vila Viçosa	25 May 1455	Dom Fernando of Braganza, 5th Count of Ourém and later 2nd Duke of Braganza	Duarte Pio of Braganza	
	Marquis of Montemor-o-Novo	1478	Dom João of Braganza, 7th Constable of Portugal	Extinct (1483)	
John II (1481–1495)
	Marquis of Vila Real	1 March 1489	Dom Pedro de Meneses, 3rd Count of Vila Real	Extinct	
Manuel I (1495–1521)
	Marquis of Torres Novas (1st creation)	27 March 1520	Dom João de Lencastre, 1st Duke of Aveiro	Extinct	
John III (1521–1557)
	Marquis of Ferreira	1533	Dom Rodrigo de Melo, 1st Count of Tentúgal	Rosalinda Álvares Pereira de Melo	
Philip I (1580–1598)
	Marquis of Santarém	1580 (created by secret charter, on condition that the holder swore allegiance to the new monarch in the State of India)	Dom Luís de Ataíde, 3rd Count of Atouguia and 10th Viceroy of India	Extinct (1581)	
Philip II (1598–1621)
	Marquis of Minas	2 January 1608	Dom Francisco de Sousa, 3rd Count of Prado	João de Castro de Mendia	
Philip III (1621–1640)
	Marquis of Montalvão	1639	Dom Jorge Mascarenhas, 1st Count of Castelo Novo	Extinct (1675)	
John IV (1640–1656)
	Marquis of Cascais	19 November 1643	Dom Álvaro Pires de Castro, 6th Count of Monsanto	Extinct (1745)	
	Marquis of Nisa	18 October 1646	Dom Vasco Luís da Gama, 5th Count of Vidigueira	Maria Teles da Gama Soares Cardoso	
Regency of Luísa de Gusmão on behalf of Afonso VI (1656–1662)
	Marquis of Marialva	11 June 1661	Dom António Luís de Meneses, 3rd Count of Cantanhede	Miguel Bernardo do Casal Ribeiro Bravo de Bragança	
Regency of Prince Pedro on behalf of Afonso VI (1668–1683)
	Marquis of Távora	6 August 1669	Luís Álvares de Távora, 3rd Count of São João da Pesqueira	Revoked (1759)	
	Marquis of Fronteira	7 January 1670	Dom João de Mascarenhas, 2nd Count of Torre	António Maria Infante da Câmara Mascarenhas	
	Marquis of Arronches	27 April 1674	Henrique de Sousa Tavares, 3rd Count of Miranda do Corvo	Carolina de Casal Ribeiro Bravo de Bragança	
Peter II (1683–1706)
	Marquis of Alorna	9 November 1688	Dom Pedro Miguel de Almeida, 1st Marquis of Castelo Novo	António Maria Infante da Câmara Mascarenhas	
John V (1706–1750)
	Marquis of Louriçal	22 April 1740	Luís Carlos Inácio Xavier de Meneses, 5th Count of Ericeira	Extinct (1844)	
Joseph I (1750–1777)
	Marquis of Tancos	22 October 1751	Dom João Manuel de Noronha, 6th Count of Atalaia	Luís Joaquim d'Orey Manuel	
	Marquis of Castelo Melhor	10 October 1766	José de Vasconcelos e Sousa Caminha Câmara Faro e Veiga, 4th Count of Castelo Melhor	Bernardo de Vasconcelos e Sousa	
	Marquis of Pombal	16 September 1769	Sebastião José de Carvalho e Melo, 1st Count of Oeiras	Sebastião José de Carvalho Daun e Lorena	
Maria I (1777–1792)
	Marquis of Ponte de Lima	17 December 1790	Dom Tomás Xavier de Lima Teles da Silva, 13th Viscount of Vila Nova de Cerveira	Unknown	
Regency of Prince João on behalf of Maria I (1792–1816)
	Marquis of Loulé	6 July 1799	Agostinho Domingos José de Mendoça Rolim de Moura Barreto, 8th Count of Vale dos Reis	Unknown	
	Marquis of Vagos	2 December 1802	Dom Francisco da Silva Telo e Meneses, 6th Count of Aveiras	Dona Maria Mafalda da Silva de Noronha Wagner	
John VI (1816–1826)
	Marquis of Viana	3 July 1821	Dom João Manuel de Meneses, 2nd Count of Viana	Unknown	
	Marquis of Palmela	3 July 1823	Dom Pedro de Sousa Holstein, later 1st Duke of Palmela	Extinct (the title was raised to a dukedom)	
Regent Pedro IV on behalf of Maria II (1832–1834)
	Marquis of Ficalho	4 April 1833	Dona Eugénia Maurícia Tomásia de Almeida Portugal, later 1st Duchess of Ficalho	Unknown	
	Marquis of Saldanha	27 May 1834	João Carlos Gregório Domingos Vicente Francisco de Saldanha Oliveira e Daun, later 1st Duke of Saldanha	Unknown	
Luís I (1861–1889)
	Marquis of Penafiel	5 February 1869	Maria da Assunção Adelaide da Mata de Sousa Coutinho, 2nd Countess of Penafiel	Manuel Maria Salema da Mata de Sousa Coutinho	

=== Marquises for successive lives ===
The only marquisate granted for a specified number of lives, becoming extinct once the lives provided for in the grant were exhausted.

Coat of arms	Title	Created	First holder	Nature	Current claimant under the Republic	Ref.
Philip II (1598–1621)
	Marquis of Castelo Rodrigo	29 January 1600	Dom Cristóvão de Moura, 1st Count of Castelo Rodrigo	For three lives	Extinct (1640)	

=== Life marquises ===
Coat of arms	Title	Created	First holder	Current claimant under the Republic	Ref.
Philip II (1598–1621)
	Marquis of Alenquer	13 October 1616	Dom Diogo da Silva e Mendoza, Count of Salinas	Extinct	
Philip III (1621–1640)
	Marquis of Porto Seguro	8 April 1627	Dom Afonso de Lencastre	Extinct	
	Marquis of Unhão	7 June 1630	Dona Maria de Lancastre	Extinct	
John IV (1640–1656)
	Marquis of Atouguia	1641	Dona Filipa de Vilhena, Countess of Atouguia and Camareira-Mor to Queen Luísa de Gusmão	Extinct (1651)	
	Marquis of Aguiar	1643	Dom Afonso de Portugal, 5th Count of Vimioso	Extinct	
Regency of Luísa de Gusmão on behalf of Afonso VI (1656–1662)
	Marquis of Fontes	2 January 1659	Dom Francisco de Sá e Meneses, 4th Count of Penaguião	Unknown	
	Marquis of Sande	21 April 1662	Francisco de Melo e Torres, 1st Count of Ponte	Unknown	
Afonso VI (1656–1683)
	Marquis of Soure	1664	Dona Francisca de Noronha	Extinct	
Peter II (1683–1706)
	Marquis of Alegrete	1687	Manuel Teles da Silva, 2nd Count of Vilar Maior	Unknown	
	Marquis of Santa Cruz	1691	Teresa de Moscoso Osório	Extinct (1724)	
John V (1706–1750)
	Marquis of Castelo Novo	24 March 1744	Dom Pedro Miguel de Almeida, 1st Marquis of Alorna	Extinct	
	Marquis of Penalva	7 February 1750	Estêvão de Meneses, 5th Count of Tarouca	Extinct	
Joseph I (1750–1777)
	Marquis of Alvito	3 May 1766	Dom José António Francisco Lobo da Silveira Quaresma, 3rd Count of Oriola	Extinct	
Regency of Prince João on behalf of Maria I (1792–1816)
	Marquis of São Miguel	7 May 1794	Margarida Xavier Botelho de Lancastre	Extinct (1821)	
	Marquis of Belas	17 December 1801	Dona Maria Rita de Castelo Branco Correia da Cunha, 6th Countess of Pombeiro	Unknown	
	Marquis of Sabugosa	13 May 1804	Dom António Maria de Melo da Silva César de Meneses, 5th Count of Sabugosa	Unknown	
	Marquis of Torres Novas (2nd creation)	13 May 1807	Dom Álvaro de Noronha Abranches Castelo Branco, 7th Count of Valadares	Unknown	
	Marquis of Olhão	21 December 1808	Dom Francisco José da Cunha de Mendonça e Meneses, 1st Count of Castro Marim	Extinct	
	Marquis of Borba	15 December 1811	Dom Tomé Xavier de Sousa Coutinho de Castelo Branco e Meneses, 13th Count of Redondo	Extinct	
	Marquis of Torres Vedras	17 December 1811	Arthur Wellesley, 1st Duke of Victoria	Extinct	
	Marquis of Campo Maior	17 December 1812	William Carr Beresford, 1st Count of Trancoso	Extinct	
	Marquis of Valada	17 December 1813	Dom Francisco Xavier de Meneses da Silveira e Castro, 1st Count of Caparica	Extinct	
John VI (1816–1826)
	Marquis of Lumiares	1819	Maria do Resgate Carneiro Portugal da Gama Vasconcelos Sousa Faro, 3rd Countess of Lumiares	Extinct	
	Marquis of Chaves	3 July 1823	Manuel da Silva Pinto da Fonseca Teixeira, 2nd Count of Amarante	Extinct	
Pedro IV (1826)
	Marquis of Angra	1 May 1826	Charles Stuart, 1st Count of Machico	Extinct	
Regent Pedro IV on behalf of Maria II (1832–1834)
	Marquis of Vila Flor	14 January 1833	António José de Sousa Manuel de Meneses Severim de Noronha, later 1st Duke of Terceira	Extinct	
	Marquis of Santa Iria	4 April 1833	Dom Luís Roque Sousa Coutinho Monteiro Paim, 3rd Count of Alva	Unknown	
	Marquis of Funchal	1833	Dom Domingos António de Sousa Coutinho, Count of Funchal	Unknown	
Maria II (1834–1853)
	Marquis of Faial	1 December 1834	Dom Domingos de Sousa Holstein, 2nd Duke of Palmela	Unknown	
	Marquis of Sampaio	1 December 1834	Manuel António de Sampaio Melo e Castro Moniz e Torres de Lusignano, 2nd Count of Sampaio	Unknown	
	Marquis of Ponta Delgada	25 January 1835	Dona Leonor da Câmara	Extinct	
	Marquis of Bemposta	11 July 1835	Jean-Guillaume Hyde de Neuville, 1st Count of Bemposta	Extinct	
	Marquis of Terena	1 July 1848	Sebastião Correia de Sá, 1st Count of Terena	Unknown	
Pedro V (1853–1861)
	Marquis of Sousa Holstein	3 September 1855	Dom Francisco de Sousa Holstein	Unknown	
	Marquis of Ribeira Grande	5 September 1855	Dom Francisco de Sales Gonçalves Zarco da Câmara, 8th Count of Ribeira Grande	Unknown	
	Marquis of Monfalim	9 August 1861	Dom Filipe de Sousa Holstein	Unknown	
Luís I (1861–1889)
	Marquis of Sá da Bandeira	3 February 1864	Bernardo de Sá Nogueira de Figueiredo, 1st Viscount of Sá da Bandeira	Unknown	
	Marquis of Sesimbra	3 February 1864	Dom Tomás de Sousa Holstein	Extinct	
	Marquis of Ávila and Bolama	24 May 1870	António José de Ávila, later 1st Duke of Ávila and Bolama	Extinct	
	Marquis of Tomar	11 July 1878	António Bernardo da Costa Cabral, 1st Count of Tomar	Extinct	
	Marquis of Graciosa	25 September 1879	Fernando Afonso Giraldes de Melo Sampaio Pereira, 1st Viscount and Count of Graciosa	Unknown	
	Marquis of Rio Maior	19 May 1886	Dom António José Saldanha Oliveira Sousa, 4th Count of Rio de Maior	Unknown	
	Marquis of Pomares	26 May 1886	Luís Maria de Carvalho Daun e Lorena	Unknown	
	Marquis of Fontes Pereira de Melo	1887	Maria Henriqueta de Fontes Pereira de Melo	Extinct	
Carlos I (1889–1908)
	Marquis of Praia and Monforte	21 January 1890	António Borges de Medeiros Dias da Câmara e Sousa, 1st Count of Praia e Monforte	Unknown	
	Marquis of Franco e Almodôvar	8 February 1894	Emílio Ernesto de Franco, 1st Count of Franco e Almodôvar	Unknown	
	Marquis of Reriz	6 September 1894	Dom António Maria Vilhena de Vasconcelos e Meneses, 1st Count of Reriz	Unknown	
	Marquis of Lindoso	1 December 1898	João Peixoto da Silva Almeida Macedo e Carvalho, 1st Count of Lindoso	Extinct	
	Marquis of Gouveia (2nd creation)	15 November 1900	Dom Afonso de Serpa Leitão Freire Pimentel, 1st Count of Gouveia	Unknown	
	Marquis of Soveral	1900	Luís Maria Augusto Pinto de Soveral	Extinct	
	Marquis of Jácome Correia	31 October 1901	Aires Jácome Correia, 2nd Count of Jácome Correia	Extinct	
	Marquis of Foz	14 November 1901	Tristão Guedes Correia de Queirós, 2nd Count of Foz	Unknown	
	Marquis of Vale Flor	7 November 1907	José Luís Constantino Dias, Count of Vale Flor	Extinct	
Date of creation undetermined
	Marquis of Pombeiro	18th century	Dona Pelágia Teresa Agostinho de Almada, Countess of Pombeiro by marriage	Extinct (1763)	
	Marquis of Bemposta-Subserra	19th century	Teodoro Estevão de La Rue de Saint-Léger, 2nd Count of Bemposta	Extinct	
	Marquis of Cadaval	20th century	Dom António Caetano Álvares Pereira de Melo	Unknown	

== See also ==
- Portuguese nobility
- List of dukedoms in Portugal
- List of countships in Portugal
- List of viscountcies in Portugal
- List of baronies in Portugal
