= João da Costa =

- Count of Soure
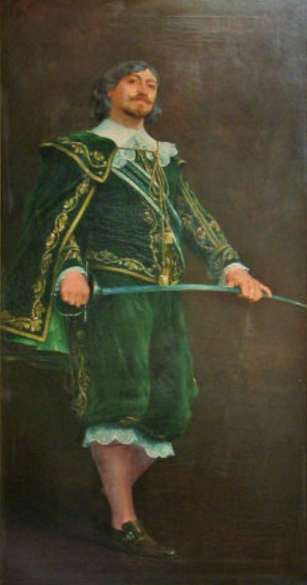

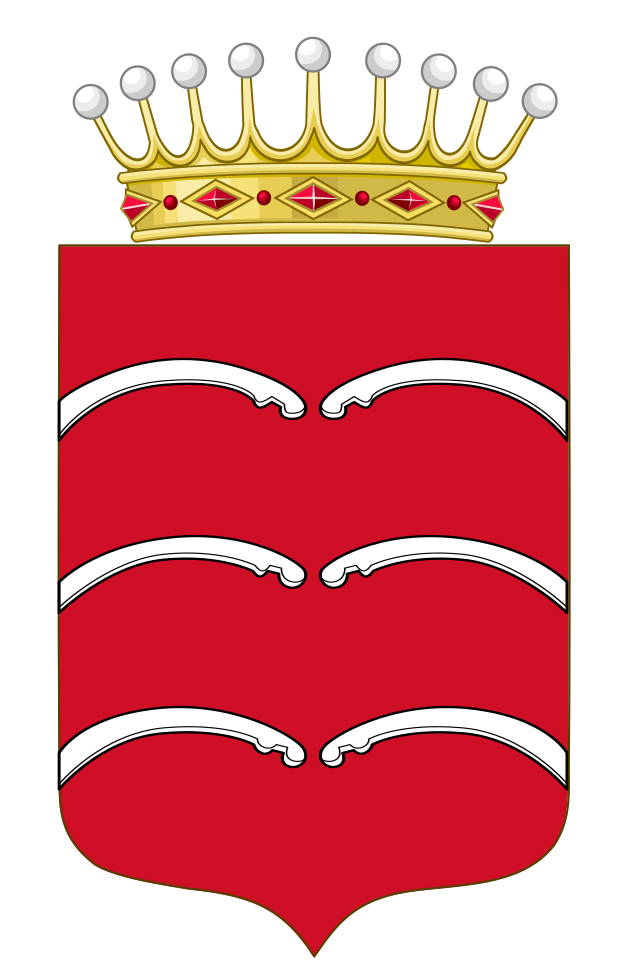
- Coat of arms
- Predecessor: Title Created
- Successor: Gil Eanes da Costa
- Known for: Member of the Forty Conspirators which supported the Portuguese Restoration War
- Born: 1610; Lisbon
- Died: 22 January 1664 (aged 53–54); Lisbon
- Offices: Ambassador Extraordinary to the Kingdom of France
- Spouse: Francisca de Noronha
- Father: Gil Eanes da Costa
- Mother: Francisca de Vasconcelos

João da Costa, first Count of Soure, (1610 in Lisbon – 22 January 1664 in Lisbon) and served in Tangier, was one of the Forty Conspirators who acclaimed King John IV king of Portugal on 1 December 1640, thus ending 60 years of Philippine rule over Portugal.

As soon as Miguel de Vasconcelos was killed, he went out to the Terreiro do Paço with Luís de Almada and other noblemen to rally the people, shouting Liberdade! (Freedom!).

The following day, on 2 December, he boarded a galley with João Rodrigues de Sá and went to summon the Spanish galleons to surrender.

He was then immediately sent to the Alentejo, specifically to Elvas, from where he managed to repel several Spanish attacks. He was appointed a member of the Council of War in 1642. In 1643, he commanded the artillery which, as part of the army of the Count of Óbidos, managed to take Valverde and Montijo. Seven years later, in 1650 and 1656, he was appointed Governor of the Arms of the Alentejo, leading troops that inflicted defeats on the Spanish forces in the region.

Problems at court, both with other nobles and with the Queen Regent herself, Luísa de Gusmão, widow of King João IV, led to his replacement in the Government of the Arms of the Alentejo.

His prestige also led to him being appointed Ambassador Extraordinary to the court of Louis XIV of France in 1659. There he came face to face with the Cardinal Prime-Minister Mazarin who, by wanting to make peace with Spain, was putting Portugal in danger. The Count commissioned his secretary, Duarte Ribeiro de Macedo, to write a manifesto outlining France's obligations to Portugal, a document that greatly upset Mazarin.

In 1660, he returned to Portugal, where he was still President of the Overseas Council, but was banished to Loulé after gaining another enemy, the Count of Castelo Melhor.

He only returned to Lisbon for the wedding of King Afonso VI.

He was buried in the chancel of the College of St Anthony of the Hermit Friars, which he patronised.

== Commendations ==
He was a commander of Castro Marim, of São Pedro das Várzeas in the town of Soure, and of Santa Maria da Beselga, all of the Order of Christ.

== Title ==
He received the title of Count of Soure by letter from King João IV, dated 15 October 1652.

== Genealogy ==
Son of Gil Eanes da Costa, commander and mayor of Castro Marim, and Francisca de Vasconcelos.

He married Francisca de Noronha, aunt and chambermaid of the Infanta Isabel Josefa, daughter of D. Pedro de Noronha, 11th Lord of Vila Verde dos Francos, and Juliana de Noronha, heiress daughter of Vasco Martins Moniz, Lord of Angeja.

Children;

- Gil Eanes da Costa (1652–1680), who succeeded him in the title (confirmed by letter from King Afonso VI on 20 March 1664) and was a Royal Councillor and Councillor of the Lisbon City Council, with descendants.
- Rodrigo da Costa (1657–1722), governor of Madeira, Brazil and Viceroy of India.
