= Afonso of Braganza, 1st Marquis of Valença =

Portuguese nobleman (1402?–1460)

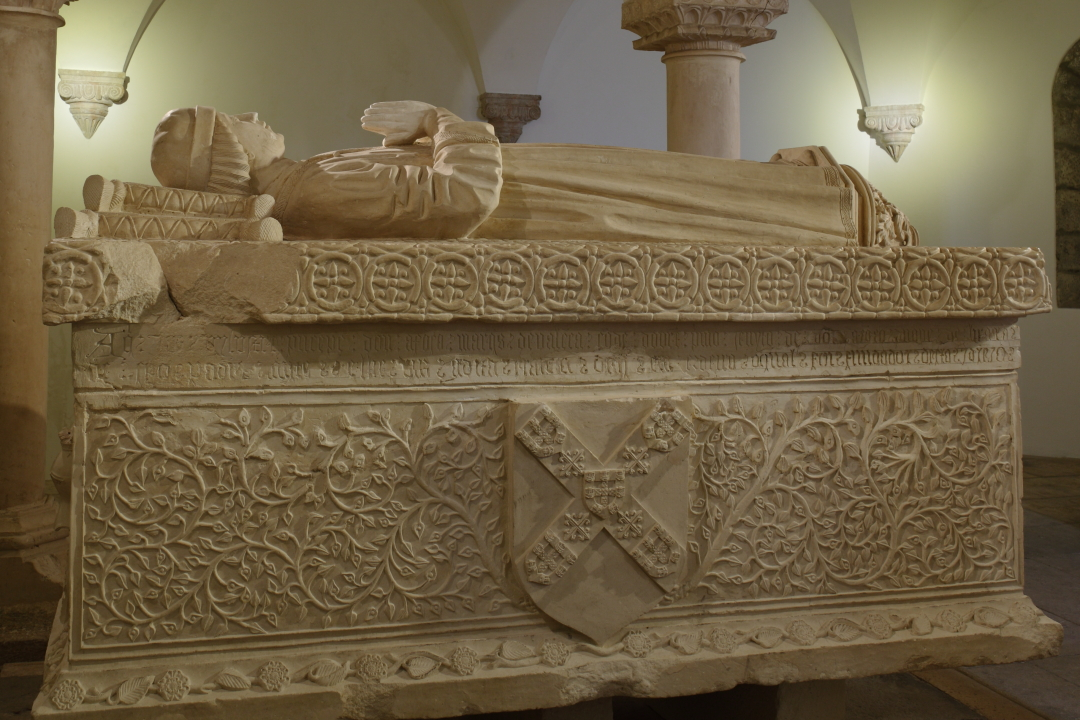
Tomb of Afonso of Braganza

Afonso of Braganza (in Portuguese Afonso), (1402? – 9 August 1460) was the eldest son of Afonso, 1st Duke of Braganza, natural son of King John I of Portugal, and of his wife, Beatriz Pereira Alvim, the only daughter of Nuno Álvares Pereira and Leonor de Alvim.

== Life ==
Through a formal document dated 4 April 1422, his maternal grandfather, the Constable Nuno Álvares Pereira, granted to him the County of Ourém. However, this grant only gained the Portuguese King Edward's royal confirmation on 24 November 1433.

Alphonse was sent by the King as his special ambassador to the Council of Basel (1436) and to the Council of Florence (1439), during which time he also visited Ferrara and Rome.

In a document issued on 11 October 1451, King Afonso V of Portugal granted him the title of Marquis of Valença. He was the first Portuguese noble to be made a Marquis.

During October 1451, he escorted Infanta Eleanor of Portugal (King Edward's daughter) on her journey from Lisbon to Livorno, where she met her betrothed, Frederick III, Holy Roman Emperor. They were married in Rome, with Pope Nicholas V blessing their marriage.

In 1458, Alphonse took part in the Portuguese expedition to north Africa which led to the capture of the Moroccan city of Alcácer Ceguer (Al Qsar as-Seghir).

Alphonse had a natural son with Dona Beatriz de Sousa (it is said that they were secretly married). This son, Afonso de Portugal, was required to join the clergy by King John II of Portugal. Afonso de Portugal was appointed Bishop of Évora. He had a natural son named Francisco de Portugal (Francis of Portugal) who was later appointed as Francis I, 1st Count of Vimioso, from whom Counts of Vimioso descend.

== Ancestry ==
Ancestors of Afonso of Braganza, 1st Marquis of Valença

8. Peter I of Portugal
4. John I of Portugal
9. Teresa Lourenço
2. Afonso I, Duke of Braganza
10. Pero Esteves, o Barbadão
5. Inês Pires
11. Maria Anes
1. Afonso, Marquis of Valença
12. Álvaro Gonçalves Pereira, Prior of Crato
6. Nuno Álvares Pereira
13. Iria Gonçalves do Carvalhal
3. Beatriz Pereira de Alvim
14. João Pires de Alvim
7. Leonor de Alvim
15. Branca Pires Coelho

== See also ==
- House of Braganza
- Duke of Braganza
- List of marquisates in Portugal
- List of countships in Portugal

== Bibliography ==
- Carvalho Correia, Francisco (2008). O Mosteiro de Santo Tirso de 978 a 1588: a silhueta de uma entidade projectada no chao de uma história milenária (in Portuguese). Santiago de Compostela: Universidade de Santiago de Compostela: Servizo de Publicacións e Intercambio Científico. ISBN 978-84-9887-038-1. Archived from the original on 4 October 2013.
- Sotto Mayor Pizarro, José Augusto (1987). Os Patronos do Mosteiro de Grijó (in Portuguese). Oporto. ISBN 978-0883-1886-37.

Afonso of Braganza, 1st Marquis of Valença House of Braganza Cadet branch of the House of Aviz Born: 1400 Died: 1460
Portuguese nobility
Preceded by Nuno Álvares Pereira	Count of Ourém; 1422–1460	Succeeded by Fernando I of Braganza
