= José Bernardino de Portugal e Castro =

Portuguese marquis and President of the Council of Ministers

His Excellency The Marquis of Valença

President of the Council of Ministers of the Kingdom of Portugal
- In office 4 November 1836 – 5 November 1836
- Monarch: Maria II of Portugal
- Preceded by: José Manuel da Cunha Faro Menezes Portugal da Gama Carneiro e Sousa
- Succeeded by: Bernardo de Sá Nogueira de Figueiredo, 1st Marquis of Sá da Bandeira

Personal details
- Born: 20 May 1780 São Salvador da Bahia, Portuguese colony of Brazil
- Died: 26 February 1840 (aged 59) Lisbon, Portugal
- Spouse: Maria José de Almeida e Noronha

José Bernardino de Portugal e Castro (20 May 1780 – 26 February 1840) was a Portuguese marquis and the President of the Council of Ministers from 4 to 5 November 1836. He was the 5th Marquis of Valença.

== Origin ==
He was a distant relative of reigning family, being a male line descendant of 1st Duke of Braganza. His father was Dom Afonso Miguel de Portugal e Castro (1748–1802), 4th marquis of Valença, 11th Count of Vimioso, governor of Bahia and descendant of Francisco de Paula de Portugal e Castro (1480–1549), 1st Count of Vimioso.

His mother was Maria Teresa Teles da Silva (1758–1804), daughter of Manuel Teles da Silva (1727–1789), 5th Marquis of Alegrete, 6th Conde de Vilar Maior, and his 2nd wife Eugénia de Menezes da Silva (1731–1788), 2nd Marquesa de Penalva & 6th Condessa de Tarouca.

Political offices
| Preceded by José Manuel da Cunha Faro Menezes Portugal da Gama Carneiro e Sousa | President of the Council of Ministers of the Kingdom of Portugal; 1836 | Succeeded by Bernardo de Sá Nogueira de Figueiredo, 1st Marquis of Sá da Bandeira |
