= Marquis of Valença =

The Marquesal House of Valença
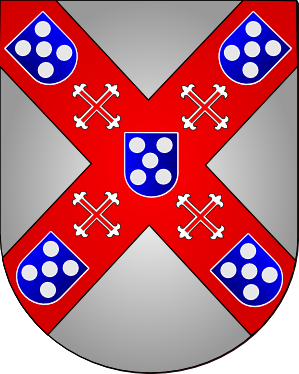
- Parent house: House of Braganza
- Country: Portugal
- Founded: 1451
- Founder: Afonso, Marquis of Valença
- Current head: D. Fernando Patrício de Portugal de Sousa Coutinho
- Titles: Marquis of Valença
- Estates: of Portugal and Brazil

Marquis of Valença (Portuguese: Marquês de Valença) was a Portuguese title of nobility granted by royal decree of King Afonso V of Portugal, dated from October 11, 1451, to Dom Afonso of Braganza (1400–1460), who already was 4th Count of Ourém. It is the 1st Marquis title in Portugal.

This title was only renovated later in the 17th century: when the 7th Count of Vimioso (belonging to the 1st Marquis’ lineage) died, King Pedro II of Portugal, through a special decree, issued on December 13, 1681, legitimated the count's natural and only son, Francisco de Paula de Portugal e Castro (Francis III), as 8th Count, and also granted him the title of 2nd Marquis of Valença.

== List of marquesses of Valença ==
1. Afonso de Portugal (c.1400-1461), 4th Count of Ourém; Eldest grandson of Dom Nuno Álvares Pereira, second Constable of Portugal, eldest son of the 1st Duke of Braganza;
2. Francisco de Paula de Portugal e Castro (1679–1749), 8th Count of Vimioso;
3. José Miguel João de Portugal e Castro (1706–1775), 9th Count of Vimioso;
4. Afonso Miguel de Portugal e Castro (1748–1802), 11th Count of Vimioso;
5. José Bernardino de Portugal e Castro (1780-1840), 12th Count of Vimioso;
6. Fernando José Luis Burnay de Sousa Coutinho, (1883–1945)
7. António Luis de Carvalho de Sousa Coutinho (1925–2007), 4th Marquis of Borba, 15th Count of Vimioso, 18th Count of Redondo, 8th Count of Soure.
8. Fernando Patrício de Portugal de Sousa Coutinho, (1956), 5th Marquis of Borba, 16th Count of Vimioso, 19th Count of Redondo, 9th Count of Soure, Count of Barreiro, Marquis of Aguiar, Count of Aguiar, Count of Basto, Marquis of Castelo Rodrigo

== See also ==
- Count of Vimioso
- List of marquisates in Portugal
- List of countships in Portugal
