= José da Gama Carneiro e Sousa =

Portuguese count and President of the Council of Ministers

His Excellency The Count of Lumiares
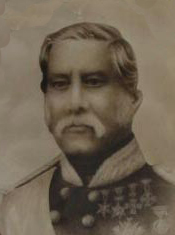

6th President of the Council of Ministers of the Kingdom of Portugal
- In office 10 September 1836 – 4 November 1836
- Monarch: Maria II of Portugal
- Preceded by: António José Severim de Noronha, 1st Duke of Terceira
- Succeeded by: José Bernardino de Portugal e Castro

Personal details
- Born: 12 January 1788 Lisbon, Portugal
- Died: 24 October 1849 (aged 61) Lisbon, Portugal
- Spouse: Luísa Henriqueta de Menezes Silveira e Castro

José Manuel da Cunha Faro Menezes Portugal da Gama Carneiro e Sousa (12 January 1788 – 24 October 1849) was a Portuguese count and the President of the Council of Ministers from 10 September to 4 November 1836. He was the 4th Count of Lumiares.

Political offices
Preceded by António José Severim de Noronha, 1st Duke of Terceira	President of the Council of Ministers of the Kingdom of Portugal; 1836	Succeeded by José Bernardino de Portugal e Castro
