= João of Braganza, Marquis of Montemor-o-Novo =

João of Braganza
- Marquis of Montemor-o-Novo
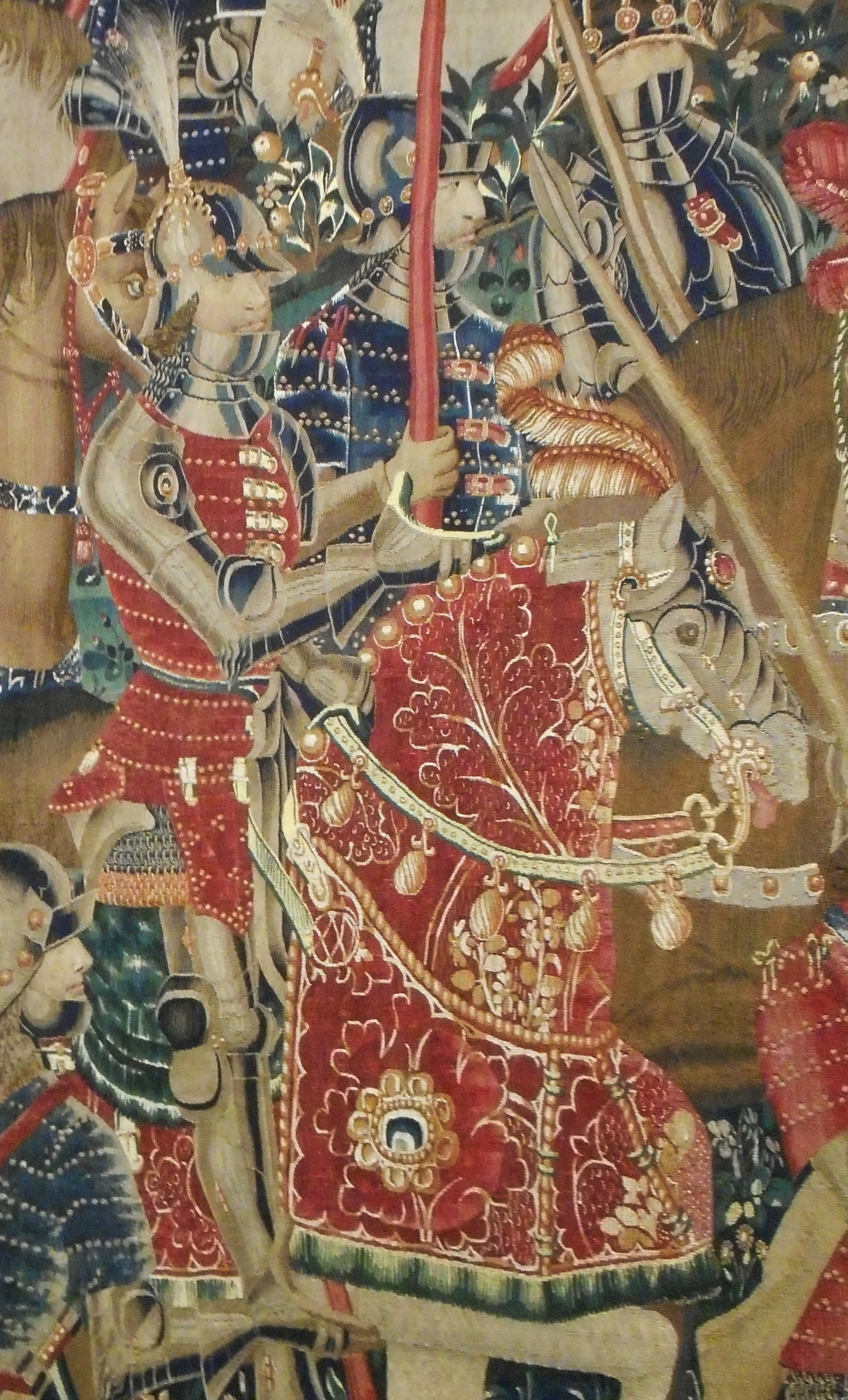
- John of Braganza leads the conquest of Tangiers in 1471, as depicted in the 15th-century Pastrana Tapestries.
- Born: c. 1430; Kingdom of Portugal
- Died: 1484; Seville, Crown of Castile
- Spouse: Isabel de Noronha
- House: Braganza
- Father: Fernando I, Duke of Braganza
- Mother: Joana de Castro
- Religion: Roman Catholicism

João of Braganza, born ca. 1430, was the second son of Fernando I, Duke of Braganza and of his wife, the duchess Joan of Castro.

== Life ==
Through a letter issued on 30 October 1471, king Afonso V of Portugal granted him the Lordship of Montemor-o-Novo and on 25 April 1473, he was appointed the 7th Constable of Portugal, as was his great-grandfather, Nuno Álvares Pereira. Later, in 1478, the same king granted him the title of Marquis of Montemor-o-Novo – he was the first and sole marquis of this title.

Before 25 July 1460, he married his 3rd cousin, Isabel of Noronha (niece of Christopher Columbus), a natural daughter of the Archbishop of Lisbon Pedro de Noronha (who was himself, a grandson of king Fernando I of Portugal and grandson of king Henry II of Castile through an illegitimate line).

When king John II of Portugal succeeded to the Portuguese throne and started actively his policy against the high nobility power (namely the Braganza and the Viseu families) João soon became one of the king's targets. He escaped to Castile but in Portugal he was condemned for treason, and his statue was symbolically executed in Abrantes, on 12 September 1483.

He died in Seville, on 30 April 1484, where he was buried, together with his wife, in the Santa Paula Monastery.

== Ancestry ==
Ancestors of João of Braganza, Marquis of Montemor-o-Novo

8. John I of Portugal
4. Afonso, 1st Duke of Braganza
9. Inês Pires
2. Fernando I, Duke of Braganza
10. Nuno Álvares Pereira
5. Beatriz Pereira de Alvim
11. Leonor de Alvim
1. João, Marquis of Montemor-o-Novo
12. Pedro de Castro, Lord of Cadaval
6. João de Castro, Lord of Cadaval
13. Leonor de Menezes
3. Joana de Castro
14. Martim Vasques da Cunha, Count of Valencia de Camp
7. Leonor da Cunha
15. Teresa Tellez-Giron, Lord of El Frechoso

== See also ==
- List of marquisates in Portugal
- House of Braganza

== Bibliography ==
- "Nobreza de Portugal e Brasil" - Vol. II, pages 29 and 30. Published by Zairol Lda., Lisbon 1989;
- "O Marquês de Montemor e a sua vida pública" de Anastásia Mestrinho Salgado, Edições Cosmos, Lisbon 1997.
