= Count of Redondo =

Portuguese title of nobility

Count of Redondo (Portuguese: Conde de Redondo) was a Portuguese title of nobility asscociated with the town of Redondo and created by a royal decree in 1481, by King Manuel I of Portugal, and granted to D. Vasco Coutinho, the son of Fernando Coutinho, Marshall of Portugal.

== List of counts ==
1. Vasco Coutinho, capitão de Arzila
2. João Coutinho, capitão de Arzila
3. Francisco Coutinho, 3.º Conde de Redondo
4. Luís Coutinho, 4th Count of Redondo
5. João Coutinho, 5.º Conde de Redondo
6. Francisco Coutinho, 6th Count of Redondo
7. Duarte de Castelo Branco, 7th Count of Redondo
8. Francisco de Castelo Branco, 8th Count of Redondo
9. Manuel Coutinho, 9th Count of Redondo
10. Fernão de Sousa de Castelo Branco Coutinho e Meneses, 10th Count of Redondo
11. Tomé de Sousa Coutinho Castelo Branco e Meneses, 11th Count of Redondo
12. Fernando de Sousa Coutinho, 12th Count of Redondo
13. Tomé Xavier de Sousa Coutinho de Castelo Branco e Meneses, 13th Count of Redondo, 1st Marquis of Borba
14. Fernando Maria de Sousa Coutinho, 14th Count of Redondo, 2nd Marquis of Borba
15. José Luís Gonzaga de Sousa Coutinho Castelo Branco e Meneses, 15th Count of Redondo
16. Fernando Luís de Sousa Coutinho Castelo Branco e Meneses, 16th Count of Redondo, 3rd Marquis of Borba
17. Fernando José Luís Burnay de Sousa Coutinho, 17th Count of Redondo (1883–1945);
18. António Luís Carvalho de Sousa Coutinho, 18th Count of Redondo (1925-2007); 7th Marquis of Valença, 4th Marquis of Borba, 15th Count of Vimioso, 8th Count of Soure;
19. Fernando Patrício de Portugal de Sousa Coutinho, 19th Count of Redondo (1956), 8th Marquis of Valença, 6th Marquis of Borba, 16th Count of Vimioso, 9th Count of Soure?

== Estates ==
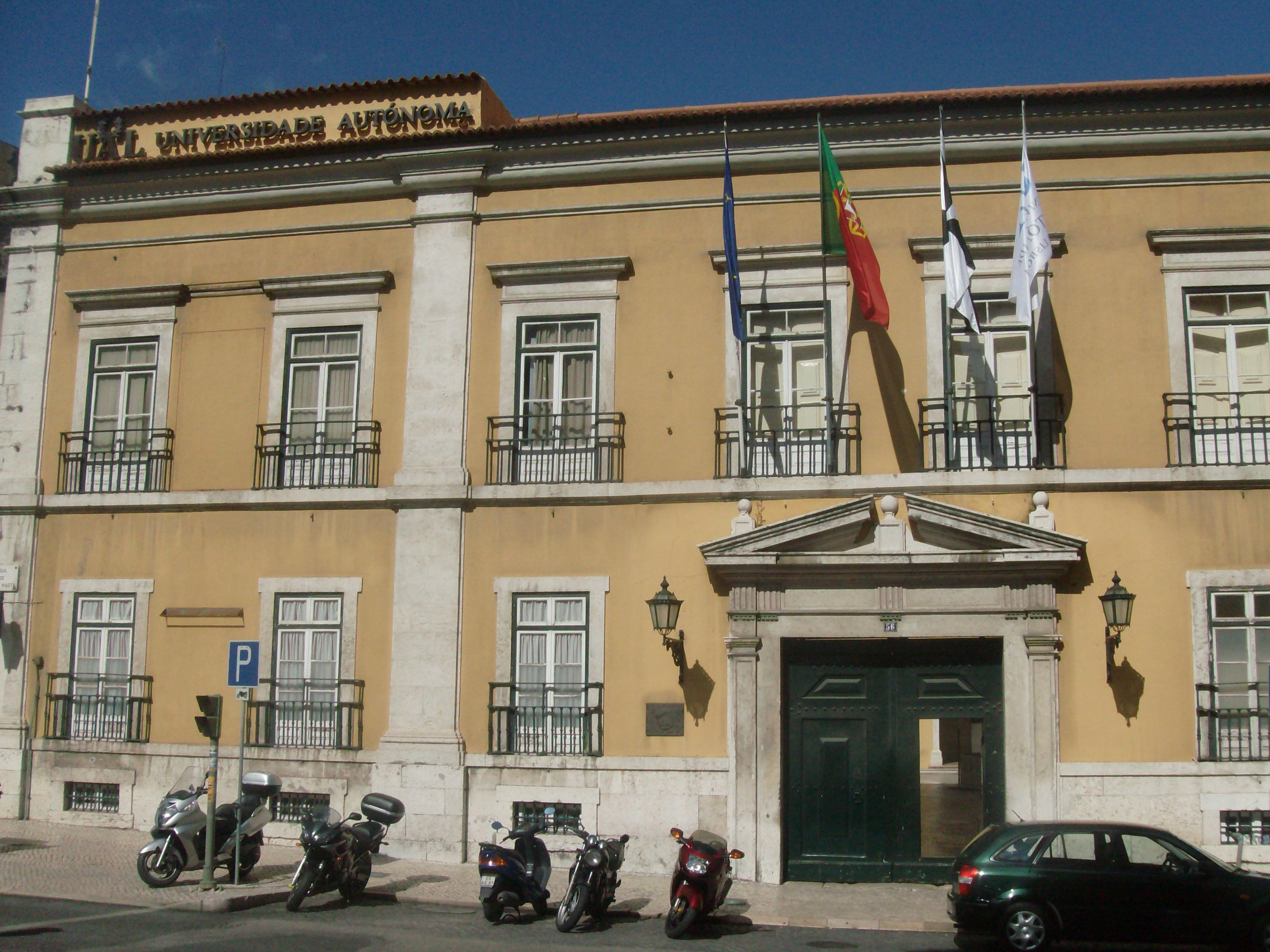
The palace of the counts of Redondo in Lisbon

The family owned a number of properties throughout Portugal. Amongst the more well-known properties are the Palace of the Counts of Redondo in Lisbon, and the Quinta do Relógio in Sintra.

== See also ==
- List of countships in Portugal
