= Count of Soure =

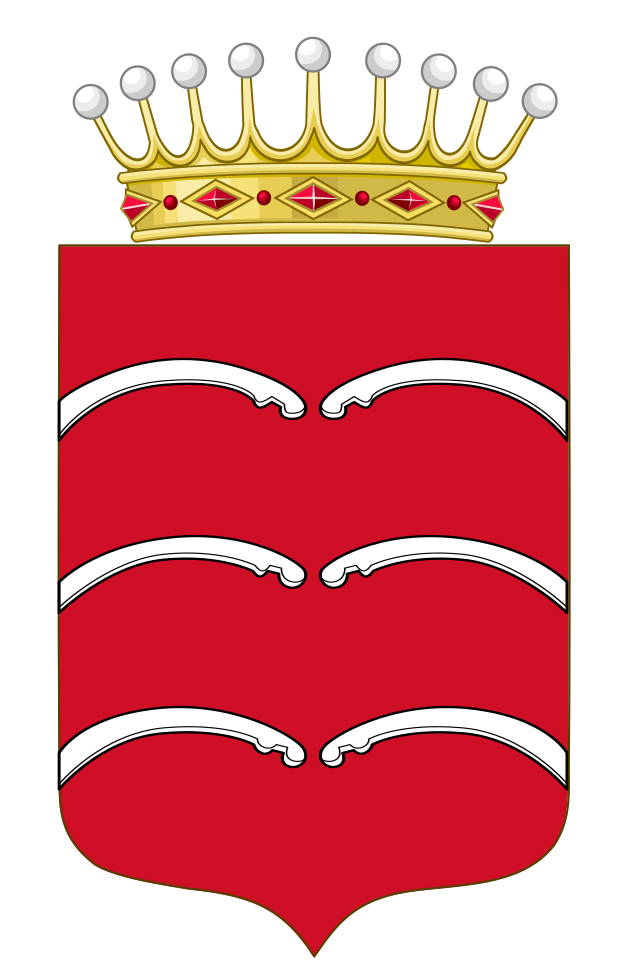
- Creation date: 15 de outubro de 1652
- Created by: John IV of Portugal
- Peerage: Peerage of Portugal
- First holder: João da Costa
- Present holder: Fernando Patrício de Portugal de Sousa Coutinho
- Heir presumptive: António Luís Belmar de Portugal de Sousa Coutinho
- Remainder to: 1st Counts's heirs. Male-preference cognatic primogeniture.

The Count of Soure title was created by King John IV of Portugal by letters patent of 15 October 1652 in favour of João da Costa.

Holders

1. João da Costa, (1610–1664)
2. Gil Eanes da Costa, (1652-1680-?)
3. Rodrigo da Costa (1657–1722),
4. João José da Costa e Sousa, (1660-?)
5. Henrique Francisco da Costa e Sousa Carvalho, (1699-?)
6. João da Costa Carvalho e Sousa, (1717–1796)
7. José António Francisco da Costa, (1726–1806)
8. Henrique José da Costa Carvalho Patalim Sousa e Lafetá, (1798–1838)

Representation of the title remained in the legitimate line of succession, but the descendants of Gil Eanes da Costa passed the title on to the Counts of Redondo, as the title had fallen to Maria Luísa da Costa, sister of the 7th Count, Henrique José, and she had married the 7th Count of Redondo.

After the establishment of the Republic and the end of the nobiliary system, there were still suitors for the title:

1. António Luís Carvalho de Sousa Coutinho (1925–2007); 4th Marquis of Borba, 18th Count of Redondo, 15th Count of Vimioso, 7th Marquis of Valença;
2. Fernando Patrício de Portugal de Sousa Coutinho (1956), 8th Marquis of Valença, 6th Marquis of Borba, 19th Count of Redondo, 16th Count of Vimioso, 3rd Marquis of Aguiar, Count of Basto, 2nd Count of Barreiro, 3rd Count of Aguiar, 4th Marquis of Castelo Rodrigo
