= Marquis of Minas =

Marquis of Minas may refer to:

- Francisco de Sousa (ca. 1540–1611), the first Marquês das Minas
- António Luís de Sousa, 2nd Marquis of Minas (1644–1721), Portuguese general and governor-general of the Portuguese colony of Brazil
- João de Sousa, 3rd Marquis of Minas (1666–1722)
