= Marquis of Praia and Monforte =

Noble title in the Kingdom of Portugal

Marquessate Praia and Monforte
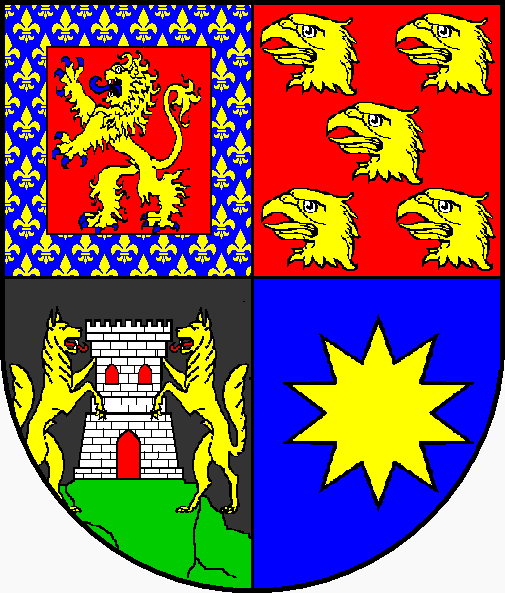
- Creation date: 21 January 1890
- Created by: Carlos I of Portugal
- First holder: Dom António Borges de Medeiros Dias da Câmara e Sousa
- Last holder: Dom Duarte Borges Coutinho de Medeiros Sousa Dias da Câmara (Monarchy abolished)
- Extinction date: 1910 (Monarchy abolished)

Marquis of Praia and Monforte is a noble title created by King Carlos I of Portugal, by decree of 21 January 1890, in favour of António Borges de Medeiros Dias da Câmara e Sousa, formerly 2nd Viscount of Praia and 1st Count of Praia and Monforte. The designation "of Monforte" was granted to him by right of his wife, Lady of that House and only daughter of the 1st Viscount of Monforte.

== History ==
Dom António Borges de Medeiros Dias da Câmara e Sousa, 2nd Viscount of Praia, 1st Count and 1st Marquess of Praia and Monforte was Lord of the great House of his ancestors and a Knight Fidalgo of the Royal Household, by royal charter of 20 October 1842. He held a bachelor's degree in Philosophy from the Faculty of Arts of the University of Coimbra and served as a Gentleman of the Royal Household in attendance at Court.

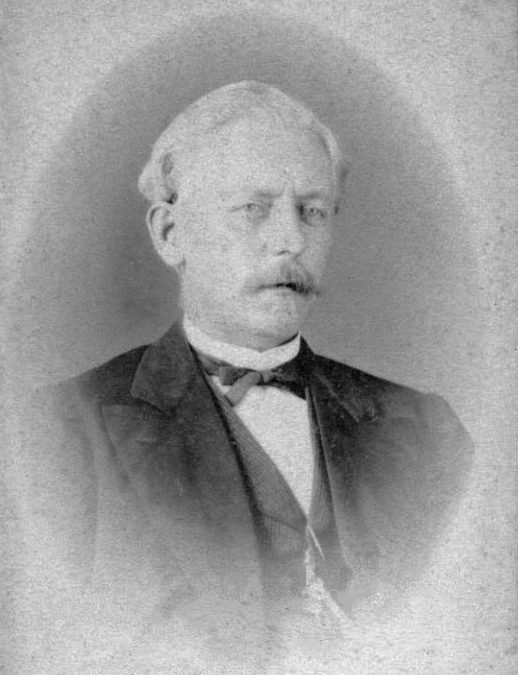
António Borges de Medeiros Dias da Câmara e Sousa, 1st Marquis of Praia and Monforte

The title of 2nd Viscount of Praia was renewed in his favour by decree of King Luís I of Portugal on 30 September 1875, and he was elevated to 1st Count of Praia and Monforte by decree of the same monarch on 9 January/July 1881. He was subsequently ennobled by King Carlos I of Portugal, by decree of 21 January 1890, with the title of 1st Marquess of Praia and Monforte.

He bore the Arms of the House of Praia: quarterly, 1st Borges, 2nd Medeiros, 3rd Câmara, and 4th Dias of the Spanish branch; crest: Borges; coronet of Viscount, later of Count and of Marquess.

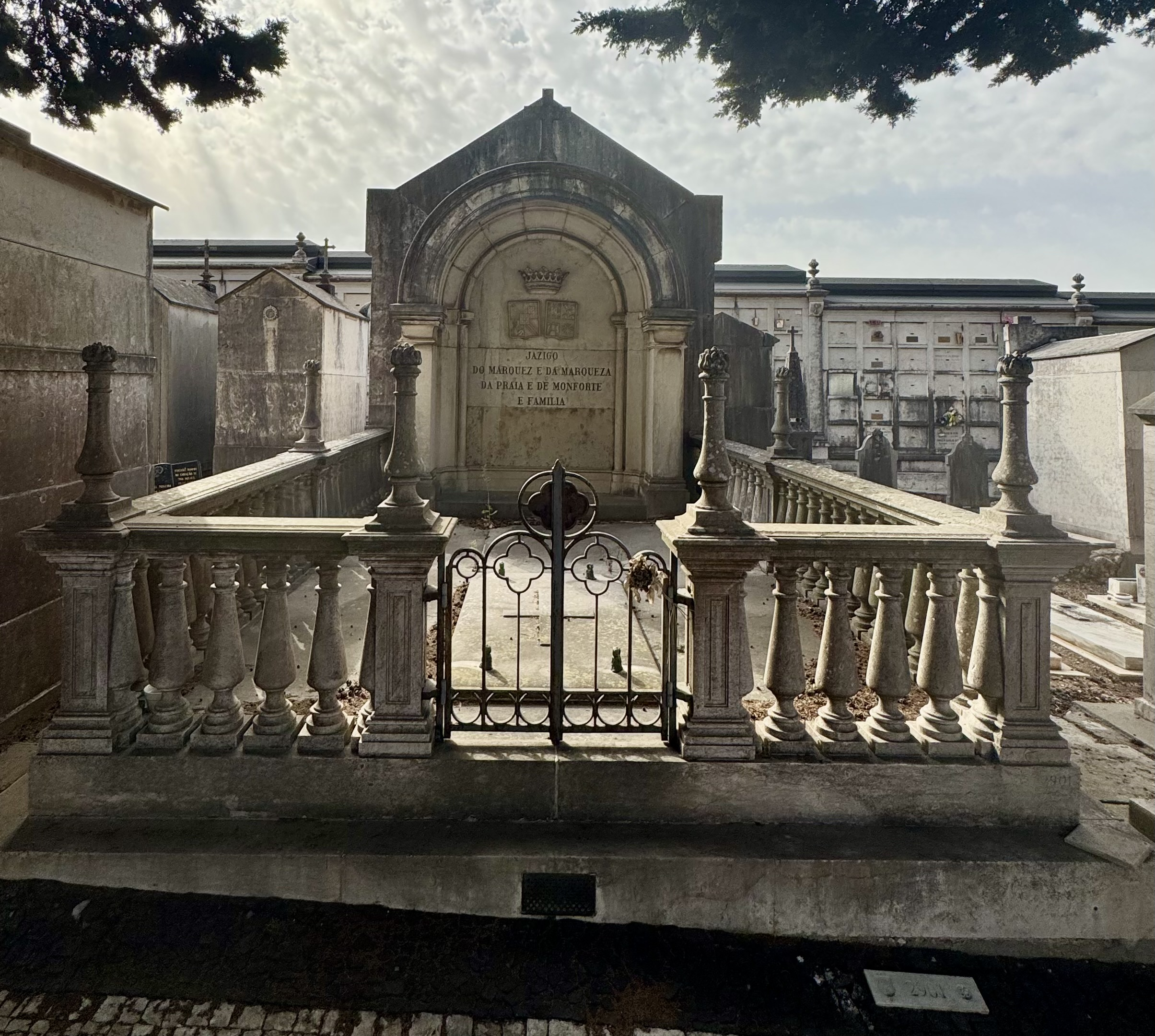
Mausoleum of the Marquis of Praia and Monforte, Prazeres Cemetery, Lisbon (August 2025)

Peer of the realm by succession, a major landowner on the island of São Miguel, in Monforte, and in Lisbon, as well as a financier and significant investor, he played a prominent role as a patron of various cultural initiatives in Ponta Delgada, including the Carlos Machado Museum and the present-day António Borges Garden, Lisbon, and Monforte. In the renowned and picturesque Vale das Furnas, São Miguel, he was co-founder, protector, and President of the Sociedade Harmónica Furnense, one of the oldest and most prestigious philharmonic societies, founded in 1864. He was also a founding partner (in 1899) of the Empresa do Elevador do Carmo, a Lisbon-based partnership company established by him, engineer Raoul Mesnier du Ponsard, and Dr João Silvestre de Almeida, a physician-surgeon. Its purpose was the construction and operation of the elevator, with a term of 99 years, equal to the duration of the concession. The capital amounted to 75 contos de réis, with Mesnier contributing the value of the concession, assessed at 9 contos de réis, plus sixteen contos in cash, and the remaining partners contributing 25 contos each.

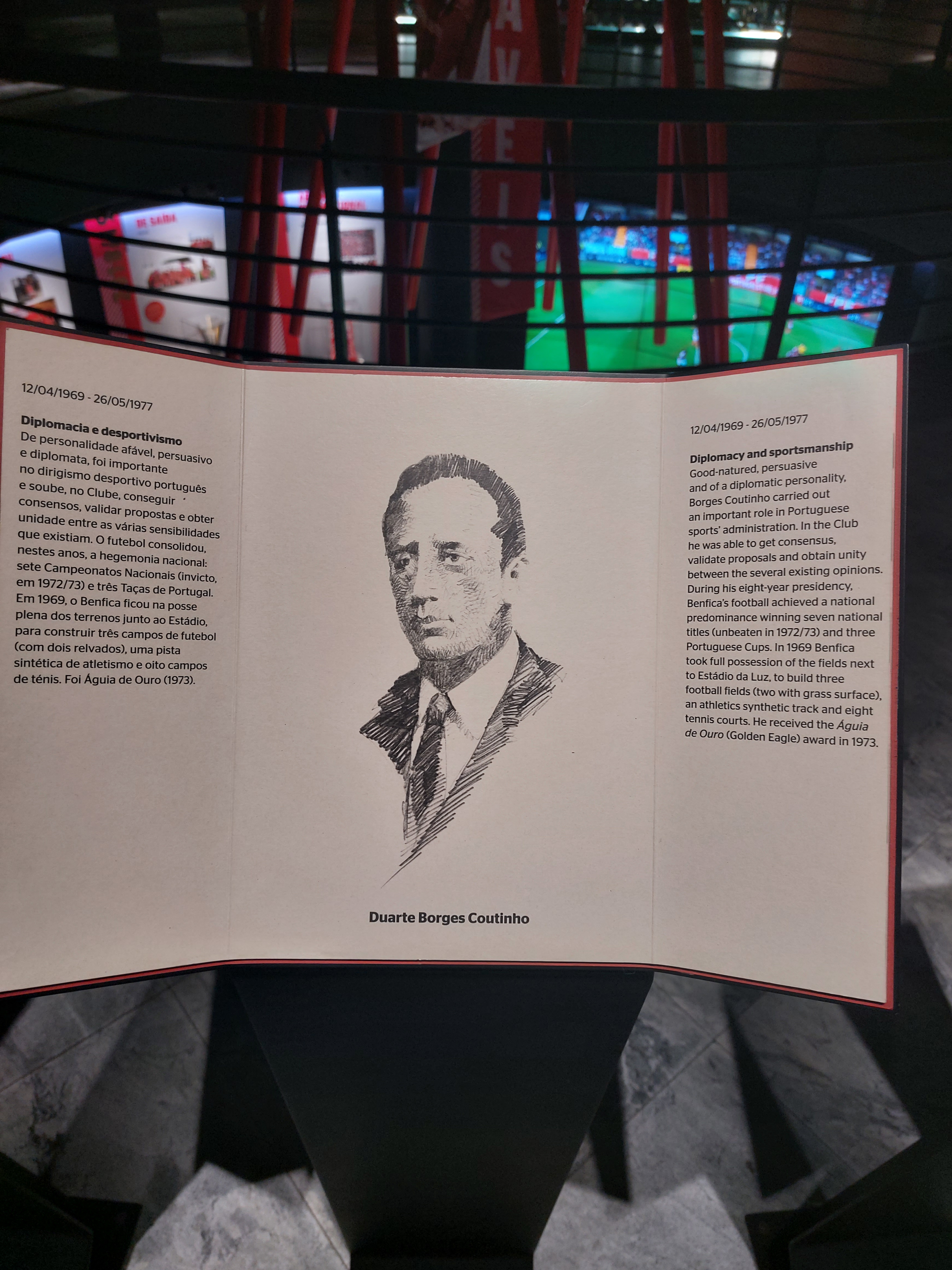
Duarte Borges Coutinho in the Hall of presidents at the Cosme Damião Museum; 26th President of S.L. Benfica; Great-grandson of the 1st Marquis and 4th claimant of the title post-Monarchy

He married in Lisbon, Santa Isabel, on 3 March 1859, Maria José Coutinho Maldonado de Albergaria Freire (13 March 1833 – 18 October 1893), only daughter and heiress of the 1st Viscount of Monforte, Lady of a major entailed estate in the Alto Alentejo.Dom Duarte Borges Coutinho de Medeiros Sousa Dias da Câmara, 2nd Marquess of Praia and Monforte, was a Portuguese politician, and eldest son of António Borges de Medeiros Dias da Câmara e Sousa, 2nd Viscount of Praia and 1st Count and 1st Marquess of Praia and Monforte, and his wife Dona Maria José Coutinho Maldonado de Albergaria Freire. He held a bachelor's degree in Law from the Faculty of Law of the University of Coimbra, served as Chief Officer of the Royal Household, and was a Peer of the realm. He was Mayor of Loures from 7 January 1896 to 31 December 1898 and from 2 January 1902 to 31 December 1904. He also acted as executor for Maria Francisca Borges Coutinho de Medeiros de Sousa Dias da Câmara, 1st Countess of Cuba by marriage.

The title of 2nd Marquess of Praia and Monforte was granted to him during his father’s lifetime by decree of King Carlos I of Portugal on 6 February 1890. He married on 5 February 1893 Dona Maria da Conceição Pinto Leite (14 December 1875 – 6 October 1933), daughter of the 1st Count of Olivais.

== Viscounts of Praia (1845) ==
#	Name	Dates	Title	Notes
1	Dom Duarte Borges da Câmara de Medeiros	1799–1872	1st Viscount of Praia	Father of 1st Marquis of Praia and Monforte
2	Dom António Borges de Medeiros Dias da Câmara e Sousa	1829–1913	2nd Viscount of Praia	Later 1st Count and 1st Marquis of Praia and Monforte

== Viscounts of Monforte (1853) ==
#	Name	Dates	Title	Notes
1	Dom Luís Coutinho de Albergaria Freire	1797–?	1st Viscount of Monforte	Father of Dona Maria José de Albergaria Freire, who later married the 1st Marquis of Praia and Monforte

== Counts of Praia and Monforte (1881) ==
#	Name	Dates	Title	Notes
1	Dom António Borges de Medeiros Dias da Câmara e Sousa	1829–1913	1st Count of Monforte	Later 1st Marquis of Praia and Monforte

== Marquises of Praia and Monforte (1890) ==
#	Name	Dates	Title	Notes
1	Dom António Borges de Medeiros Dias da Câmara e Sousa	1829–1913	1st Marquis of Praia and Monforte	Father of the 2nd Marquis of Praia and Monforte
2	Dom Duarte Borges Coutinho de Medeiros de Sousa Dias da Câmara	1829–1913	2nd Marquis of Praia and Monforte	Son of the 1st Marquis; The title of Marquis of Praia and Monforte was granted to him during his father's lifetime by decree of King Carlos I of Portugal

== Claimants post-Monarchy ==
#	Name	Dates	Title	Notes
3	Dom António Borges Coutinho de Medeiros Sousa Dias da Câmara	1895–1969	3rd Marquis of Praia and Monforte	Son of the 2nd Marquis of Praia and Monforte
4	Dom Duarte Borges Coutinho	1921–1981	4th Marquis of Praia and Monforte	Son of the 3rd Marquis of Praia and Monforte; Was 26th President of Sport Lisboa e Benfica
5	Dona Ana Maria Borges Coutinho de Noronha	b.1951	5th Marchioness of Praia and Monforte	Daughter of the 4th Marquis

== Notes ==
- This article was originally translated, in whole or in part, from the Portuguese Wikipedia article titled "Marquês da Praia e Monforte".
