= Count of Vimioso =

Portuguese title of nobility

The Comital House of Vimioso
- Parent house: House of Braganza
- Country: Portugal
- Founded: 1515; 511 years ago
- Founder: Francisco de Portugal
- Current head: Fernando Patrício de Portugal de Sousa Coutinho
- Titles: Count of Vimioso; Marquis of Valença
- Estates: of Portugal and Brazil

Count of Vimioso (in Portuguese Conde de Vimioso) is a Portuguese title of nobility which have its origins in Alphonse, Bishop of Évora, the natural son of Alphonse, 4th Count of Ourém and 1st Marquis of Valença (eldest son of Alphonse I, Duke of Braganza). Therefore, the Counts of Vimioso were closely related to the Braganzas.

This title was created on February 2, 1515, by King Manuel I of Portugal for his 3rd cousin, Francisco de Portugal (Francis of Portugal), also known as Francis I, 1st Count of Vimioso, a natural son of Alphonse of Portugal, Bishop of Évora.

The House of the Counts of Vimioso had also close links with the Portuguese Royal family, as members of the King's Council, ambassadors, and viceroys. The 2nd Count, Alphonse I of Portugal, joined King Sebastian in his crusade in Morocco, and died there (during the Battle of Alcácer Quibir in 1578 or, according to others, imprisoned by the moors after the battle).

This was one of the few Portuguese high aristocracy families to support António, Prior of Crato against Philip II of Spain claims, during the War of the Portuguese Succession (1580–1583). The 3rd Count, Dom Francisco de Portugal (Francis II), was appointed António Constable, leading the Portuguese armies in the Battle of Alcântara (1580); he found death, two years later, in the naval Battle of Vila Franca, off São Miguel Island, in the Azores.

The family supported the 1640 revolution against the Spanish Habsburgs, receiving a new title from the Braganzas (Marquis of Aguiar, in 1643).

In 1687, the 7th Count, Dom Miguel de Portugal (Michael of Portugal), died without legitimate issue. To avoid that such an illustrious family would be extinct, the King Pedro II of Portugal, through a special decree, issued on December 13, 1681, legitimated the count's natural son, Francisco de Paula (or Francis III), as 8th Count, giving him all his father's honours and titles.

During the romantic period, the 13th Count of Vimioso (1817–1865) was quite a popular personality not only among aristocracy but also throughout the Portuguese society: he was a remarkable horse-rider, participating in bullfightings, with a bohemian life style; his mistress was the quite known fado singer, Maria Severa, and the story was later popularized by literature, music (the famous Fado do Conde de Vimioso), theatre and movies (A Severa).

== List of the Counts ==
1. Francisco de Portugal (1485–1549), Francis I, 1st Count of Vimioso in 1515
2. Afonso de Portugal (1519–1579), Alphonse I
3. Francisco de Portugal, 3rd Count of Vimioso (1550–1582), Francis II
4. Luis de Portugal (1555–1637), Louis I
5. Afonso de Portugal (1591–1649), Alphonse II
6. Luis de Portugal (1620–1655), Louis II
7. Miguel de Portugal (1631–1687), Michael
8. Francisco de Paula de Portugal e Castro (1679–1749), Francis III, became 2nd Marquis of Valença
9. José Miguel João de Portugal e Castro (1706–1775), José I
10. Francisco José Miguel de Portugal e Castro (1736–1771), Francis IV
11. Afonso Miguel de Portugal e Castro (1748–1802), Alphonse III
12. José Bernardino de Portugal e Castro (1780–1840), José II
13. Francisco de Paula de Portugal e Castro (1817–1865), Francis V
14. José Luis de Sousa Coutinho Castelo-Branco e Menezes (1859–1930)
15. António Luis de Sousa Coutinho (1925–2007)
16. Fernando Patrício de Portugal de Sousa Coutinho (b. 1956)

== Other titles ==
Other titles granted to this family were:

- Marquis of Valença, in 1451, by King Alphonse V;
- Marquis of Aguiar, in 1643, by King John IV;
- Count of Aguiar, in 1808, by Queen Maria I.

== Family name ==
The Counts' family name was de Portugal, as they descended from King John I of Portugal.

In the late 17th Century, the 8th Count, Francisco de Paula, also known as Francis III, joined the name Castro, given that he had inherited from an aunt properties and titles belonging to the Castro family and, from then on, the Counts bore de Portugal e Castro (of Portugal and Castro) as their family name.

In the late 19th Century, the Counts' family name became Sousa Coutinho, due to the marriage of Maria José de Portugal e Castro, the 13th Count's heir, with Fernando Luis de Sousa Coutinho (Marquis of Borba).

== Genealogical summary ==
JOHN I (1357–1433); King of Portugal
DUARTE I (1391–1438); King of Portugal	AFONSO (1377–1470); 1st.Duke of Braganza
JOHN (1400–1442); Lord of Reguengos	ISABEL (1402–1465)	AFONSO (1400–1460); 1st.Marquis of Valença	FERNANDO I (1403–1478); 2nd.Duke of Braganza
FERNANDO (1433–1470); 2nd.Duke of Viseu; 1st.Duke of Beja	BEATRICE (1430–1506)	ALPHONSE (c.1462-1522); Bishop of Évora	FERNANDO II (1430–1483); 3rd.Duke of Braganza
MANUEL I (1469–1521); 4th.Duke of Beja; King of Portugal	FRANCIS I (1485–1549); 1st.Count of Vimioso
Royal House of Portugal	House of Vimioso	House of Braganza

== See also ==
- List of countships in Portugal

== Bibliography ==
- "Nobreza de Portugal e do Brasil" – Vol. III, Pages 536-543. Published by Zairol Lda., Lisbon 1989.
