= List of countships in Portugal =

Noble titles of Portugal
Dukedoms of Portugal
Marquisates of Portugal
Countships of Portugal
Viscountcies of Portugal
Baronies of Portugal

This is a list of countships in Portugal (Portuguese: Condados; singular Condado; the title is Conde, for Count, and Condessa, for Countess):

== Historical overview ==
Portugal first emerged as county of the Kingdom of León, the Condado Portugalense (County of Porto). The first Portuguese county that appears in the historical record is the county of Sousa granted by king Sancho I to the rico-homem (name given to the highest nobility) Mendo de Sousa, but was of personal nature, meaning that was only to the receiver and was not renewed on his heirs and was not linked to any territory. The first territorial county was Barcelos, granted to João Afonso Teles de Meneses in 1298. During the first dinasty the titles of nobility were scarce and only given to the most prominent nobles, as was the case of the counts of Barcelos, all members of the Meneses family. All counties where returned to the Crown after the death of the holder, being the King able to choose if he was going to renew the title on a relative of the deceased or extinguish it.

With the 1383-5 revolution and the ascent of the Master of Avis to the throne, the counties existing where removed to the holders, as they had sided against the new King. Later, King João I granted the 3 counties that where active (Barcelos, Ourém and Arraiolos) to the Constable of the kingdom, Dom Nuno Alvares Pereira, who was his main supporter during the war. When Nuno's daughter, Beatriz Pereira Alvim, married the king's illegitimate son, Afonso, he gave the county of Barcelos to his son-in-law. Later, Nuno would give his other 2 counties to his grandsons (sons of Afonso and Beatriz): Afonso (Ourém) and Fernando (Arraiolos). Thus in the begin of the Avis Dinasty, the counties where belonging of relatives to the Crown.

In 1910, the Republic was implanted and since then the titles of nobility are extinct, although several descendants of the counts still claim their titles. As curiosity, the last county to be granted was granted on April 16, 1910 (172 days before the Republic) to Manuel António da Costa Pereira, made Count of Costa Pereira.

== A ==
- Count of Abrantes
- Count of Agarez
- Count of Agrolongo
- Count of Águeda
- Count of Aguiar
- Count of Albuquerque
- Count of Alcáçovas
- Count of Alcântara
- Count of Alcoutim
- Count of Alegrete
- Count of Alentém
- Count of Alferrarede
- Count of Algoso
- Count of Alhandra
- Count of Almada
- Count of Almarjão
- Count of Almedina
- Count of Almeida
- Count of Almeida Araújo
- Count of Almendra
- Count of Almoster
- Count of Alpedrinha
- Count of Alpendurada
- Count of Alte
- Count of Alto Mearim
- Count of Alva
- Count of Alvelos
- Count of Alves Machado
- Count of Alviela
- Count of Alvito
- Count of Alvor
- Count of Amarante
- Count of Ameal
- Count of Anadia
- Count of Antas
- Count of Arcos
- Count of Arganil
- Count of Arge
- Count of Ariz
- Count of Armamar
- Count of Armil
- Count of Arnoso
- Count of Arraiolos
- Count of Arriaga
- Count of Arrochela
- Count of Assumar
- Count of Atalaia
- Count of Atouguia
- Count of Aurora
- Count of Aveiras
- Count of Avelar
- Count of Aveiro
- Count of Ávila
- Count of Avilez
- Count of Avintes
- Count of Avranches
- Count of Azambuja
- Count of Azarujinha
- Count of Azenha
- Count of Azevedo
- Count of Azevedo e Silva
- Count of Azinhaga
- Count of Azinhoso

== B ==
- Count of Bahía
- Count of Barbacena
- Count of Barca
- Count of Barcelos
- Count of Barreiro
- Count of Barros
- Count of Basto
- Count of Beirós
- Count of Belchite
- Count of Belmonte
- Count of Bemposta
- Count of Bertiandos
- Count of Boavista
- Count of Bobadela
- Count of Bobone
- Count of Bolhão
- Count of Bonfim
- Count of Borba
- Count of Borralha
- Count of Botelho
- Count of Bovieiro
- Count of Bracial
- Count of Burnay

== C ==
- Count of Cabo de Santa Maria
- Count of Cabo de São Vicente
- Count of Cabral
- Count of Cacilhas
- Count of Caetano Pinto
- Count of Calçada
- Count of Calhariz
- Count of Calhariz de Benfica
- Count of Calheiros
- Count of Calheta
- Count of Camarido
- Count of Caminha
- Count of Campanhã
- Count of Campo Belo
- Count of Canavial
- Count of Cantanhede
- Count of Caparica
- Count of Carcavelos
- Count of Caria
- Count of Carnide
- Count of Carnota
- Count of Carreira
- Count of Cartaxo
- Count of Carvalhais
- Count of Carvalhal
- Count of Carvalhido
- Count of Casal
- Count of Casal Ribeiro
- Count of Cascais
- Count of Castanheira
- Count of Castelo
- Count of Castelo Branco
- Count of Castelo de Paiva
- Count of Castelo Melhor
- Count of Castelo Mendo
- Count of Castelo Novo
- Count of Castelo Rodrigo
- Count of Castro
- Count of Castro Daire
- Count of Castro e Sola
- Count of Castro Guimarães
- Count of Castro Marim
- Count of Castro Minas
- Count of Cavaleiros
- Count of Cedofeita
- Count of Chaves
- Count of Coculim
- Count of Condeixa
- Count of Correia Bettencourt
- Count of Costa
- Count of Costa Pereira
- Count of Covilhã
- Count of Côvo
- Count of Cuba
- Count of Cunha
- Count of Cunha Matos

== D ==
- Count of Daupias
- Count of Devezas
- Count of Donalda
- Count of Duparchy

== E ==
- Count of Ega
- Count of Ephrussi
- Count of Ericeira
- Count of Ervideira
- Count of Esperança
- Count of Estarreja
- Count of Estrela
- Count of Évora Monte

== F ==
- Count of Faro
- Count of Farrobo
- Count of Feira
- Count of Feitosa
- Count of Felgueiras
- Count of Fenais
- Count of Ferreira
- Count of Ficalho
- Count of Figueira
- Count of Figueiredo de Magalhães
- Count of Figueiró
- Count of Fijô
- Count of Folgosa
- Count of Fontalva
- Count of Fonte Bela
- Count of Fonte Nova
- Count of Fornos de Algodres
- Count of Foz
- Count of Foz de Arouce
- Count of Franco e Almodôvar
- Count of Funchal

== G ==
- Count of Galveias
- Count of Geraz do Lima
- Count of Gouveia
- Count of Graciosa
- Count of Guarda
- Count of Guazava
- Count of Guimarães

== I ==
- Count of Idanha-a-Nova
- Count of Ilha da Madeira
- Count of Ilha do Príncipe
- Count of Itacolumi

== J ==
- Count of Jácome Correia
- Count of Jimenez de Molina
- Count of Juncal
- Count of Junqueira

== L ==
- Count of La Ville sur Illon
- Count of Laborim
- Count of Lagoaça
- Count of Lancastre
- Count of Lapa
- Count of Lavradio
- Count of Leça
- Count of Leiria
- Count of Leopoldina
- Count of Lindoso
- Count of Linhares
- Count of Lobata
- Count of Loulé
- Count of Lourinhã
- Count of Lousã
- Count of Lumbrales
- Count of Lumiares

== M ==
- Count of Macedo
- Count of Machico
- Count of Macieira
- Count of Mafra
- Count of Magalhães
- Count of Mahem
- Count of Mangualde
- Count of Margaride
- Count of Marialva
- Count of Marim
- Count of Martens Ferrão
- Count of Massarelos
- Count of Matosinhos e São João da Foz
- Count of Melo
- Count of Mendia
- Count of Mértola
- Count of Mesquita
- Count of Mesquitela
- Count of Miranda do Corvo
- Count of Moita
- Count of Molelos
- Count of Monforte
- Count of Monsanto
- Count of Monsaraz
- Count of Monte Real
- Count of Moser
- Count of Moçâmedes
- Count of Moura
- Count of Muge
- Count of Murça

== N ==
- Count of Napier de São Vicente
- Count of Neiva
- Count of Nevogilde
- Count of Nova Goa

== O ==
- Count of Óbidos
- Count of Odemira
- Count of Oeiras
- Count of Olivais
- Count of Oliveira dos Arcos
- Count of Olivença
- Count of Oriola
- Count of Ottolini
- Count of Ourém

== P ==
- Count of Paço de Arcos
- Count of Paço de Vitorino
- Count of Paço do Lumiar
- Count of Paçô Vieira
- Count of Palma
- Count of Palma de Almeida
- Count of Palmela
- Count of Paraty
- Count of Pedroso de Albuquerque
- Count of Penafiel
- Count of Penaguião
- Count of Penalva
- Count of Penalva de Alva
- Count of Penamacor
- Count of Penela
- Count of Penha Firme
- Count of Penha Garcia
- Count of Penha Longa
- Count of Peniche
- Count of Pereira Marinho
- Count of Pernambuco
- Count of Pinhel
- Count of Podentes
- Count of Pomarão
- Conde de Pombeiro
- Count of Ponte
- Count of Ponte de Santa Maria
- Count of Pontével
- Count of Portalegre
- Count of Porto
- Conde de Porto Brandão
- Count of Porto Covo da Bandeira
- Count of Porto Santo
- Count of Portugal
- Count of Portugal de Faria
- Count of Póvoa
- Count of Povolide
- Count of Prado
- Count of Prado da Selva
- Count of Praia da Vitória
- Count of Praia e Monforte
- Count of Prime
- Count of Proença-a-Velha

== Q ==
- Count of Quinta das Canas

== R ==
- Count of Ravelada
- Count of Redinha
- Count of Redondo
- Count of Refúgio
- Count of Rego Botelho
- Count of Rendufe
- Count of Reriz
- Count of Resende
- Count of Restelo
- Count of Ribandar
- Count of Ribeira Grande
- Count of Ribeiro da Silva
- Count of Ribeiro Real
- Count of Rilvas
- Count of Rio Grande
- Count of Rio Maior
- Count of Rio Pardo

== S ==
- Count of Sabrosa
- Count of Sabugal
- Count of Sabugosa
- Count of Safira
- Count of Saldanha
- Count of Samodães
- Count of Sandim
- Count of Sandomil
- Count of Santa Catarina
- Count of Santa Cruz
- Count of Santa Eulália (de Pindo, Penalva do Castelo)
- Count of Santa Eulália (de Santa Eulália, Seia)
- Count of Santa Isabel
- Count of Santa Luzia
- Count of Santa Marinha
- Count of Santar
- Count of Santiago de Beduído
- Count of Santiago de Lobão
- Count of Santo André
- Count of São Bento
- Count of São Cosme do Vale
- Count of São Januário
- Count of São João da Pesqueira
- Count of São João de Ver
- Count of São Joaquim
- Count of São Lourenço
- Count of São Mamede
- Count of São Marçal
- Count of São Martinho
- Count of São Miguel
- Count of São Paio
- Count of São Salvador de Matosinhos
- Count of São Vicente
- Count of Sarmento
- Count of Sarzedas
- Count of Sebastião de Pinho
- Count of Seia
- Count of Seisal
- Count of Seixas
- Count of Selir
- Count of Sena
- Count of Sena Fernandes
- Count of Serém
- Count of Serra da Tourega
- Count of Serra Largo
- Count of Sieuve de Menezes
- Count of Silvã
- Count of Silva Monteiro
- Count of Silva Sanches
- Count of Silves
- Count of Simas
- Count of Sintra
- Count of Sobral
- Count of Sortelha
- Count of Soure
- Count of Sousa Coutinho
- Count of Sousa e Faro
- Count of Sousa Rosa
- Conde de Stucky de Quay
- Count of Subserra
- Count of Sucena

== T ==
- Count of Tabueira
- Count of Taipa
- Count of Tarouca
- Count of Tavarede
- Count of Tentúgal
- Count of Terena
- Count of Tojal
- Count of Tomar
- Count of Tondela
- Count of Torre
- Count of Torre Bela
- Count of Torres Novas
- Count of Torres Vedras
- Count of Tovar
- Count of Trancoso
- Count of Trindade

== U ==
- Count of Unhão

== V ==
- Count of Valadares
- Count of Valbom
- Count of Valbranca
- Count of Vale da Rica
- Count of Vale de Reis
- Count of Vale Flor
- Count of Valença
- Count of Valenças
- Count of Verride
- Count of Viana
- Count of Viana (da Foz do Lima)
- Count of Viana (do Alentejo)
- Count of Vidigueira
- Count of Vila da Horta
- Count of Vila da Praia da Vitória
- Count of Vila de Pangim
- Count of Vila Flor
- Count of Vila Franca
- Count of Vila Franca do Campo
- Count of Vila Nova
- Count of Vila Nova de Cerveira
- Count of Vila Nova de Portimão
- Count of Vila Pouca
- Count of Vila Pouca de Aguiar
- Count of Vila Real
- Count of Vila Verde
- Count of Vilalva
- Count of Vilar Maior
- Count of Vilar Seco
- Count of Vilas Boas
- Count of Vilela
- Count of Vimeiro
- Count of Vimieiro
- Count of Vimioso
- Count of Vinhais
- Count of Vinhó
- Count of Vizela

== W ==
- Count of Wilson
- Count of Weiss

== See also ==
- County of Portugal
- Portuguese nobility
- Dukedoms in Portugal
- List of baronies in Portugal
- List of marquisates in Portugal
- List of viscountcies in Portugal
