= List of viscountcies in Portugal =

Noble titles of Portugal
Dukedoms of Portugal
Marquisates of Portugal
Countships of Portugal
Viscountcies of Portugal
Baronies of Portugal

This is a list of viscountcies in Portugal.

Note that some of the titles are only used as subsidiary titles.

This list does may include extinct, dormant, abeyant, forfeited or titles of which their holder is not known.

== A ==
1. Viscount of Abrançalha
2. Viscount of Abrigada
3. Viscount of Agarez
4. Viscount of Agualva
5. Viscount of Aguieira
6. Viscount of Airey
7. Viscount of Albergaria de Souto Redondo
8. Viscount of Alcácer do Sal
9. Viscount of Alcafache
10. Viscount of Alcaide
11. Viscount of Alcântara
12. Viscount of Alcobaça
13. Viscount of Alcochete
14. Viscount of Alenquer
15. Viscount of Alentém
16. Viscount of Alferrarede
17. Viscount of Algés
18. Viscount of Alhandra
19. Viscount of Alhos Vedros
20. Viscount of Aljezur
21. Viscount of Almeida
22. Viscount of Almeida Araújo
23. Viscount of Almeida e Vasconcelos
24. Viscount of Almeida Garrett
25. Viscount of Almeidinha
26. Viscount of Almendra
27. Viscount of Alpedriz
28. Viscount of Alpendurada
29. Viscount of Alpiarça
30. Viscount of Altas Moras
31. Viscount of Alte
32. Viscount of Alter do Chão
33. Viscount of Alto Dande
34. Viscount of Alvalade
35. Viscount of Alvelos
36. Viscount of Alverca
37. Viscount of Alves de Sá
38. Viscount of Alves Machado
39. Viscount of Alves Mateus
40. Viscount of Alvor
41. Viscount of Ameal
42. Viscount of Amoreira da Torre
43. Viscount of Amoroso Lima
44. Viscount of Amparo
45. Viscount of Anadia
46. Viscount of Andaluz
47. Viscount of Antas
48. Viscount of Antunes Braga
49. Viscount of Araújo
50. Viscount of Arcas
51. Viscount of Arcozelo
52. Viscount of Ariz
53. Viscount of Arneiro
54. Viscount of Arneirós
55. Viscount of Arriaga
56. Viscount of Asseca
57. Viscount of Asselin
58. Viscount of Assentiz
59. Viscount of Atouguia
60. Viscount of Augusto Correia
61. Viscount of Aurora
62. Viscount of Avelar
63. Viscount of Azarujinha
64. Viscount of Azenha
65. Viscount of Azevedo
66. Viscount of Azevedo e Silva
67. Viscount of Azevedo Ferreira
68. Viscount of Azinheira
69. Viscount of Azurara

== B ==
1. Viscount of Baçar
2. Viscount of Bahía
3. Viscount of Balsemão
4. Viscount of Banho
5. Viscount of Barbacena
6. Viscount of Barcel
7. Viscount of Barcelinhos
8. Viscount of Bardez
9. Viscount of Barreira
10. Viscount of Barreiro
11. Viscount of Barreiros
12. Viscount of Barros Lima
13. Viscount of Barrosa
14. Viscount of Barroso
15. Viscount of Bastos
16. Viscount of Baux d'Aviette
17. Viscount of Beire
18. Viscount of Beirós
19. Viscount of Bela Vista
20. Viscount of Belfort
21. Viscount of Belver
22. Viscount of Benagazil
23. Viscount of Benalcanfor
24. Viscount of Benavente
25. Viscount of Bertiandos
26. Viscount of Bessone
27. Viscount of Bettencourt
28. Viscount of Bianchi
29. Viscount of Bischoffsheim
30. Viscount of Bivar
31. Viscount of Boavista
32. Viscount of Bóbeda
33. Viscount of Bom Sucesso
34. Viscount of Borges da Silva
35. Viscount of Borges de Castro
36. Viscount of Borralha
37. Viscount of Botelho
38. Viscount of Botelho de Seabra
39. Viscount of Bouça
40. Viscount of Bouzões
41. Viscount of Bovieiro
42. Viscount of Britiande
43. Viscount of Bruges
44. Viscount of Bucelas
45. Viscount of Bustos

== C ==
1. Viscount of Cabo de Santa Maria
2. Viscount of Cabo de São Vicente
3. Viscount of Cabrela
4. Viscount of Cacongo
5. Viscount of Caetano Pinto
6. Viscount of Calçada
7. Viscount of Calhariz de Benfica
8. Viscount of Camarate
9. Viscount of Campanhã
10. Viscount of Canas
11. Viscount of Canelas
12. Viscount of Cantim
13. Viscount of Capelinha
14. Viscount of Carcavelos
15. Viscount of Cardoso da Silva
16. Viscount of Caria
17. Viscount of Carmo
18. Viscount of Carnaxide
19. Viscount of Carnide
20. Viscount of Carregoso
21. Viscount of Carreira
22. Viscount of Carriche
23. Viscount of Cartaxo
24. Viscount of Carvalhais
25. Viscount of Carvalhido
26. Viscount of Carvalho
27. Viscount of Carvalho Moreira
28. Viscount of Casa Branca
29. Viscount of Castanheira de Pera
30. Viscount of Castedo
31. Viscount of Castelo
32. Viscount of Castelo Alvo
33. Viscount of Castelo Branco
34. Viscount of Castelo da Lousã
35. Viscount of Castelo de Borges
36. Viscount of Castelo Novo
37. Viscount of Castelões
38. Viscount of Castilho
39. Viscount of Castro
40. Viscount of Castro e Sola
41. Viscount of Castro Guedes
42. Viscount of Castro Guidão
43. Viscount of Castro Silva
44. Viscount of Cauípe
45. Viscount of Cedofeita
46. Viscount of Cercal
47. Viscount of Chabert
48. Viscount of Champalimaud-Duff
49. Viscount of Chanceleiros
50. Viscount of Charruada
51. Viscount of Cidraes
52. Viscount of Condeixa (I)
53. Viscount of Condeixa (II)
54. Viscount of Condeixa (III)
55. Viscount of Coriscada
56. Viscount of Correia Botelho
57. Viscount of Correia Godinho
58. Viscount of Córte
59. Viscount of Cortegaça
60. Viscount of Coruche
61. Viscount of Corujeira
62. Viscount of Costa
63. Viscount of Costa Franco
64. Viscount of Costa Veiga
65. Viscount of Covilhã
66. Viscount of Cruz Alta
67. Viscount of Cunha Matos

== D ==
1. Viscount of Damão
2. Viscount of Daupias
3. Viscount of Degracias
4. Viscount of Denfert-Rochereau
5. Viscount of Desterro
6. Viscount of Devezas
7. Viscount of Dominguizo
8. Viscount of Duprat
9. Viscount of Dupuy d'Angeac

== E ==
1. Viscount of Ephrussi
2. Viscount of Ermida
3. Viscount of Ervedal
4. Viscount of Ervedal da Beira
5. Viscount of Ervedosa
6. Viscount of Ervideira
7. Viscount of Esperança
8. Viscount of Espinhal
9. Viscount of Espinhosa
10. Viscount of Estói
11. Viscount of Estrela
12. Viscount of Estremoz

== F ==
1. Viscount of Falcarreira
2. Viscount of Faria
3. Viscount of Faria e Maia
4. Viscount of Faria Machado
5. Viscount of Faria Pinho
6. Viscount of Faro
7. Viscount of Faro e Oliveira
8. Viscount of Feitosa
9. Viscount of Ferreira
10. Viscount of Ferreira Alves
11. Viscount of Ferreira de Abreu
12. Viscount of Ferreira de Almeida
13. Viscount of Ferreira do Alentejo
14. Viscount of Ferreira Lima
15. Viscount of Ferreira Pinto
16. Viscount of Ferreri
17. Viscount of Ferrocinto
18. Viscount of Fervença
19. Viscount of Figanière
20. Viscount of Figueiredo
21. Viscount of Fijô
22. Viscount of Fontainhas
23. Viscount of Fonte Arcada
24. Viscount of Fonte Boa
25. Viscount of Fonte do Mato
26. Viscount of Fonte Nova
27. Viscount of Fornos de Algodres
28. Viscount of Fouquier
29. Viscount of Foz
30. Viscount of Foz de Arouce
31. Viscount of Fragosela
32. Viscount of Fraião
33. Viscount of Franco e Almodôvar
34. Viscount of Francos
35. Viscount of Freixo

== G ==
1. Viscount of Gama
2. Viscount of Gameiro
3. Viscount of Gândara
4. Viscount of Gandarinha
5. Viscount of Garcez
6. Viscount of Gay
7. Viscount of Gemunde
8. Viscount of Geraz do Lima
9. Viscount of Gerês
10. Viscount of Gião
11. Viscount of Giraúl
12. Viscount of Girod
13. Viscount of Godim
14. Viscount of Goguel
15. Viscount of Gomes Pinto
16. Viscount of Gomiei
17. Viscount of Gonçalves de Freitas
18. Viscount of Gonçalves Pinto
19. Viscount of Gondoriz
20. Viscount of Gouveia
21. Viscount of Graça
22. Viscount of Graceira
23. Viscount of Graciosa
24. Viscount of Gramosa
25. Viscount of Granja
26. Viscount of Granja do Tedo
27. Viscount of Granjão
28. Viscount of Guedes
29. Viscount of Guedes Teixeira
30. Viscount of Guiães
31. Viscount of Guilhofrei
32. Viscount of Guilhomil
33. Viscount of Guinfões

== H ==
1. Viscount of Hamilton
2. Viscount of Horncastle

== I ==
1. Viscount of Idanha
2. Viscount of Itacolumi
3. Viscount of Itaguaí
4. Viscount of Itaguí do Norte

== J ==
1. Viscount of Junqueira
2. Viscount of Juromenha

== L ==
1. Viscount of Laborim
2. Viscount of Lagoa
3. Viscount of Lagoaça
4. Viscount of Lagos
5. Viscount of Lajeosa
6. Viscount of Lançada
7. Viscount of Lancastre
8. Viscount of Landal
9. Viscount of Lapa
10. Viscount of Laranjeiras
11. Viscount of Las Casas
12. Viscount of Leceia
13. Viscount of Leiria
14. Viscount of Leite Perry
15. Viscount of Lemos
16. Viscount of Lengruber
17. Viscount of Leopoldina
18. Viscount of Lindoso
19. Viscount of Lobão
20. Viscount of Lobata
21. Viscount of Loureiro
22. Viscount of Loures
23. Viscount of Lourinhã
24. Viscount of Lousada
25. Viscount of Luzares

== M ==
1. Viscount of Macedo de Cavaleiros
2. Viscount of Macedo Pinto
3. Viscount of Macieira
4. Viscount of Magé
5. Viscount of Mahem
6. Viscount of Maiorca
7. Viscount of Maiors
8. Viscount of Malanza
9. Viscount of Mangualde
10. Viscount of Manique do Intendente
11. Viscount of Marco
12. Viscount of Margaride
13. Viscount of Mariares
14. Viscount of Marinha Grande
15. Viscount of Marinho
16. Viscount of Marmeleiro
17. Viscount of Marzovelos
18. Viscount of Mason de São Domingos
19. Viscount of Massamá
20. Viscount of Matalha
21. Viscount of Mato
22. Viscount of Mayrink
23. Viscount of Meireles
24. Viscount of Melício
25. Viscount of Melo Barreto
26. Viscount of Menezes
27. Viscount of Merceana
28. Viscount of Mesquitela
29. Viscount of Messengil
30. Viscount of Messines
31. Viscount of Midões (1st)
32. Viscount of Midões (2nd)
33. Viscount of Milhundos
34. Viscount of Mindelo
35. Viscount of Mira Vouga
36. Viscount of Miragaia
37. Viscount of Miranda
38. Viscount of Miranda do Corvo
39. Viscount of Mirandela
40. Viscount of Mogofores
41. Viscount of Moimenta da Beira
42. Viscount of Molelos
43. Viscount of Monção
44. Viscount of Monforte
45. Viscount of Monsanto
46. Viscount of Monsaraz
47. Viscount of Monserrate
48. Viscount of Montalegre
49. Viscount of Montalvo
50. Viscount of Montargil
51. Viscount of Montariol
52. Viscount of Monte Belo
53. Viscount of Monte Redondo
54. Viscount of Monte São
55. Viscount of Montedor
56. Viscount of Montjuïc
57. Viscount of Morais
58. Viscount of Morais Cardoso
59. Viscount of Morais Sarmento
60. Viscount of Morão
61. Viscount of Moreira de Rei
62. Viscount of Moser
63. Viscount of Mossâmedes
64. Viscount of Moura
65. Viscount of Mozelos

== N ==
1. Viscount of Nandufe
2. Viscount of Napier de São Vicente
3. Viscount of Napóles e Lemos
4. Viscount of Nazaré
5. Viscount of Negrelos
6. Viscount of Nevogilde
7. Viscount of Nivert
8. Viscount of Nogueiras
9. Viscount of Noronha
10. Viscount of Nossa Senhora da Luz
11. Viscount of Nossa Senhora das Mercês
12. Viscount of Nossa Senhora do Porto de Ave
13. Viscount of Nova Granada
14. Viscount of Nova Java

== O ==
1. Viscount of Odivelas
2. Viscount of Ogorman
3. Viscount of Oleiros
4. Viscount of Olivã
5. Viscount of Olivais
6. Viscount of Olival
7. Viscount of Oliveira
8. Viscount of Oliveira do Conde
9. Viscount of Oliveira do Douro
10. Viscount of Oliveira do Paço
11. Viscount of Oliveira Duarte
12. Viscount of Orta
13. Viscount of Ottolini
14. Viscount of Ouguela
15. Viscount of Outeiro
16. Viscount of Ovar

== P ==
1. Viscount of Paço d'Arcos
2. Viscount of Paço de Lumiar
3. Viscount of Paço de Nespereira
4. Viscount of Paiva
5. Viscount of Paiva Manso
6. Viscount of Palma de Almeida
7. Viscount of Palmeira
8. Viscount of Paradinha do Outeiro
9. Viscount of Paredes
10. Viscount of Parada Leitão
11. Viscount of Passadiço
12. Viscount of Passos
13. Viscount of Pedralva
14. Viscount of Pedroso
15. Viscount of Pedroso da Silva
16. Viscount of Pedroso de Albuquerque
17. Viscount of Penalva de Alva
18. Viscount of Penedo
19. Viscount of Pereira
20. Viscount of Pereira e Cunha
21. Viscount of Pereira Machado
22. Viscount of Pereira Marinho
23. Viscount of Perném
24. Viscount of Pernes
25. Viscount of Peso da Régua
26. Viscount of Peso de Melgaço
27. Viscount of Picoas
28. Viscount of Piedade
29. Viscount of Pimentel
30. Viscount of Pindela
31. Viscount of Pinheiro
32. Viscount of Pinhel
33. Viscount of Pinto da Rocha
34. Viscount of Podentes
35. Viscount of Poiares
36. Viscount of Pomarão
37. Viscount of Ponte da Barca
38. Viscount of Ponte de Santa Maria
39. Viscount of Ponte e Sousa
40. Viscount of Ponte Ferreira
41. Viscount of Portalegre
42. Viscount of Porto Covo da Bandeira
43. Viscount of Porto da Cruz
44. Viscount of Porto Formoso
45. Viscount of Porto Marim
46. Viscount of Porto Salvo
47. Viscount of Portocarreiro
48. Viscount of Povoença
49. Viscount of Praia
50. Viscount of Praia Grande de Macau
51. Viscount of Prime
52. Viscount of Proença Vieira
53. Viscount of Proença-a-Velha

== Q ==
1. Viscount of Queluz
2. Viscount of Quinta da Alegria
3. Viscount of Quinta das Canas
4. Viscount of Quinta de São Tomé
5. Viscount of Quinta do Ferro

== R ==
1. Viscount of Real Agrado
2. Viscount of Reboleiro
3. Viscount of Rebordosa
4. Viscount of Roboredo
5. Viscount of Regaleira
6. Viscount of Régua
7. Viscount of Reguengo
8. Viscount of Rendufe
9. Viscount of Reriz
10. Viscount of Reynella
11. Viscount of Riba Tâmega
12. Viscount of Riba Tua
13. Viscount of Ribamar
14. Viscount of Ribandar
15. Viscount of Ribeira Brava
16. Viscount of Ribeira de Alijó
17. Viscount of Ribeira do Paço
18. Viscount of Ribeiro da Silva
19. Viscount of Ribeiro Magalhães
20. Viscount of Ribeiro Real
21. Viscount of Rilvas
22. Viscount of Rio Claro
23. Viscount of Rio Sado
24. Viscount of Rio Seco
25. Viscount of Rio Tinto
26. Viscount of Rio Torto
27. Viscount of Rio Vez
28. Viscount of Rio Xévora
29. Viscount of Rocha de Portimão
30. Viscount of Rodrigues da Cunha
31. Viscount of Rodrigues de Oliveira
32. Viscount of Roriz
33. Viscount of Rosário
34. Viscount of Ruães

== S ==
1. Viscount of Sá da Bandeira
2. Viscount of Sacavém
3. Viscount of Safira
4. Viscount of Sagres
5. Viscount of Salgado
6. Viscount of Salreu
7. Viscount of Samodães
8. Viscount of Sanches de Baena
9. Viscount of Sanches de Frias
10. Viscount of Sanchez
11. Viscount of Sande
12. Viscount of Sanderval
13. Viscount of Santa Catarina
14. Viscount of Santa Cruz
15. Viscount of Santa Cruz do Bispo
16. Viscount of Santa Eulália
17. Viscount of Santa Isabel
18. Viscount of Santa Luzia
19. Viscount of Santa Margarida
20. Viscount of Santa Maria de Arrifana
21. Viscount of Santa Marinha
22. Viscount of Santa Marinha da Trindade
23. Viscount of Santa Marta
24. Viscount of Santa Mónica
25. Viscount of Santa Quitéria
26. Viscount of Santana
27. Viscount of Santarém
28. Viscount of Santiago
29. Viscount of Santiago da Guarda
30. Viscount of Santiago de Cacém
31. Viscount of Santiago de Caiola
32. Viscount of Santiago de Lobão
33. Viscount of Santiago de Riba de Ul
34. Viscount of Santo Albino
35. Viscount of Santo Amaro
36. Viscount of Santo Ambrósio
37. Viscount of Santo André
38. Viscount of Santo António de Lourido
39. Viscount of Santo António de Vessadas
40. Viscount of Santo António do Vale da Piedade
41. Viscount of Santo Elias
42. Viscount of Santo Tirso
43. Viscount of Santo Varão
44. Viscount of São Bartolomeu
45. Viscount of São Bartolomeu de Messines
46. Viscount of São Bento
47. Viscount of São Bernardo
48. Viscount of São Boaventura
49. Viscount of São Caetano
50. Viscount of São Carlos
51. Viscount of São Clemente de Basto
52. Viscount of São Cosme do Vale
53. Viscount of São Cristóvão
54. Viscount of São Domingos
55. Viscount of São Fins
56. Viscount of São Gião
57. Viscount of São Gil de Perre
58. Viscount of São Januário
59. Viscount of São Jerónimo
60. Viscount of São João
61. Viscount of São João da Madeira
62. Viscount of São João da Pesqueira
63. Viscount of São João Nepomuceno
64. Viscount of São Joaquim
65. Viscount of São Jorge
66. Viscount of São Justo
67. Viscount of São Laurindo
68. Viscount of São Lázaro
69. Viscount of São Lourenço
70. Viscount of São Luís
71. Viscount of São Luís de Braga
72. Viscount of São Mamede
73. Viscount of São Manuel
74. Viscount of São Marçal
75. Viscount of São Mateus
76. Viscount of São Miguel Ângelo
77. Viscount of Sâo Miguel de Seide
78. Viscount of Sâo Paio dos Arcos
79. Viscount of São Pedro do Rego da Murta
80. Viscount of São Pedro do Sul
81. Viscount of São Salvador de Matosinhos
82. Viscount of São Salvador de Tangil
83. Viscount of São Sebastião
84. Viscount of Sâo Torquato
85. Viscount of São Valentim
86. Viscount of São Venâncio
87. Viscount of São Veríssimo
88. Viscount of São Vicente da Pena de Vilar
89. Viscount of Sapucaí
90. Viscount of Sardoal
91. Viscount of Sarmento
92. Viscount of Sarzedo
93. Viscount of Schmidt
94. Viscount of Seabra
95. Viscount of Seisal
96. Viscount of Semelhe
97. Viscount of Sena Fernandes
98. Viscount of Sendielos
99. Viscount of Senhora da Ribeira
100. Viscount of Sérgio de Sousa
101. Viscount of Serpa Pinto
102. Viscount of Serra da Tourega
103. Viscount of Serra do Pilar
104. Viscount of Serra Largo
105. Viscount of Serrado
106. Viscount of Setúbal
107. Viscount of Sieuve de Menezes
108. Viscount of Silho
109. Viscount of Silva
110. Viscount of Silva Andrade
111. Viscount of Silva Carvalho
112. Viscount of Silva Cota
113. Viscount of Silva Figueira
114. Viscount of Silva Loio
115. Viscount of Silva Melo
116. Viscount of Silva Monteiro
117. Viscount of Silva Viana
118. Viscount of Silvares
119. Viscount of Silveira
120. Viscount of Silves
121. Viscount of Sinde
122. Viscount of Sistelo
123. Viscount of Soares Franco
124. Viscount of Sobral
125. Viscount of Sobreira
126. Viscount of Socorro
127. Viscount of Somzée
128. Viscount of Sorraia
129. Viscount of Sotomaior
130. Viscount of Sousa Carvalho
131. Viscount of Sousa da Fonseca
132. Viscount of Sousa Prego
133. Viscount of Sousa Rego
134. Viscount of Sousa Soares
135. Viscount of Sousel
136. Viscount of Sousela
137. Viscount of Soutelo
138. Viscount of Souto
139. Viscount of Souto d'El-Rei
140. Viscount of Soveral
141. Viscount of Stern
142. Viscount of Sucena

== T ==
1. Viscount of Taíde
2. Viscount of Tangil
3. Viscount of Tardinhade
4. Viscount of Taveiro
5. Viscount of Tavira
6. Viscount of Teixeira de Carvalho
7. Viscount of Teles de Menezes
8. Viscount of Telheiras
9. Viscount of Tinalhas
10. Viscount of Tojal
11. Viscount of Tondela
12. Viscount of Torrão
13. Viscount of Torre
14. Viscount of Torre Bela
15. Viscount of Torre da Murta
16. Viscount of Torre das Donas
17. Viscount of Torre de Moncorvo
18. Viscount of Torre do Terrenho
19. Viscount of Torres (1850)
20. Viscount of Torres (1883)
21. Viscount of Torres Novas
22. Viscount of Tortozendo
23. Viscount of Tourinho
24. Viscount of Tramagal
25. Viscount of Trancoso
26. Viscount of Treixedo
27. Viscount of Trevões
28. Viscount of Trindade

== V ==
1. Viscount of Valbranca
2. Viscount of Valdemouro
3. Viscount of Valdoeiro
4. Viscount of Vale da Costa
5. Viscount of Vale da Gama
6. Viscount of Vale da Piedade
7. Viscount of Vale de Remígio
8. Viscount of Vale de Sobreda
9. Viscount of Vale de Sobreira
10. Viscount of Vale Flor
11. Viscount of Vale Paraíso
12. Viscount of Vale Pereiro
13. Viscount of Valmor
14. Viscount of Valongo
15. Viscount of Vargem da Ordem
16. Viscount of Várzea
17. Viscount of Várzea da Ourada
18. Viscount of Veiga Cabral
19. Viscount of Veiros
20. Viscount of Vela
21. Viscount of Viamonte da Silveira
22. Viscount of Vieira
23. Viscount of Vila Boim
24. Viscount of Vila Gião
25. Viscount of Vila Maior
26. Viscount of Vila Mendo
27. Viscount of Vila Moura
28. Viscount of Vila Nova da Rainha
29. Viscount of Vila Nova de Cabanyas
30. Viscount of Vila Nova de Cerveira
31. Viscount of Vila Nova de Famalicão
32. Viscount of Vila Nova de Foz Coa
33. Viscount of Vila Nova de Gaia
34. Viscount of Vila Nova de Ourém
35. Viscount of Vila Nova de Souto d'El-Rei
36. Viscount of Vila Nova do Minho
37. Viscount of Vila Pouca
38. Viscount of Vila Verde
39. Viscount of Vilar de Allen
40. Viscount of Vilarinho de São Romão
41. Viscount of Vilela
42. Viscount of Vinha Brava
43. Viscount of Vinhais
44. Viscount of Vinhal
45. Viscount of Viomeril

== W ==
1. Viscount of Westheimer
2. Viscount of Wildik
3. Viscount of Wrem

== X ==
1. Viscount of Ximenez

== Z ==
1. Viscount of Zambujal

== See also ==
- Portuguese nobility
- Dukedoms in Portugal
- List of baronies in Portugal
- List of countships in Portugal
- List of marquisates in Portugal
