= Count of Alte =

- Creation date: 4 June 1868
- Created by: Luís I of Portugal
- Peerage: Kingdom of Portugal
- First holder: João Carlos da Horta Teles Machado da Franca
- Last holder: João Carlos da Horta Teles Machado da Franca
- Present holder: António José Maria Gonçalo da Franca de Horta Machado (claimant)
- Remainder to: Life grant (one life)
- Subsidiary titles: Viscount of Alte
- Extinction date: 1910 (monarchy abolished)
- Former seats: House of the Counts of Alte, Alte

Count of Alte (in portuguese: Conde de Alte) was a Portuguese title of nobility created by King Luís I, by decree of 4 June 1868 and royal letter of 12 September 1870, in favour of João Carlos da Horta Teles Machado da Franca, until then 1st Viscount of Alte. The title was granted for life, with the honours of a Grandee.

The title of Viscount of Alte, granted in 1851, was renewed in 1902 in favour of a son of the 1st Count. Two other sons received titles of their own: João Carlos da Horta Machado da Franca, Count of Selir, and António José Horta Machado da Franca, 1st Count of Marim.

== History ==
The title belonged to the Horta Machado family, of Aragonese origin, who had held the rank of fidalgo-cavaleiro of the Royal Household since 1663. The paternal grandparents of the first holder, João Carlos de Miranda e Horta Machado, lord of the entail of Torre de Marim, in Faro, and Maria Benta Jacinta da Franca Corte-Real, lady of the entails of Ator, Alte and Selir, united through their marriage the entails of Torre de Marim and of Ator, Alte and Selir.

João Carlos Maria da Franca Horta Teles Machado da Cunha de Mendonça e Melo de Ribadeneira e Aragão Corte-Real, the only Count of Alte, was born in Lisbon on 6 August 1810. He was the son of Francisco José da Horta Osório Machado, a diplomat and lord of the entails of Torre de Marim, Ator, Alte, Selir and Rosenha, and of Vitória José da Costa de Sousa de Macedo, daughter of the 2nd Viscounts of Mesquitela. A moço fidalgo in active service at the Palace and lord of Alte and Marim, he pursued a diplomatic career: he was envoy extraordinary and minister plenipotentiary at the courts of Turin and Naples, and was on a special mission to Pope Pius IX from 1857 to 1862. He was made a peer of the Realm by royal letter of 29 December 1881.

He was granted the title of Viscount of Alte, for life and in reward for his father's services, by decree of 26 November 1851 and royal letter of 16 February 1853 from Queen Maria II, and was raised to the rank of Grandee as Count of Alte by decree of 4 June 1868 and royal letter of 12 September 1870 from King Luís I; both grants were registered in the Torre do Tombo. The title of count was not renewed. That of viscount was renewed by King Carlos I in 1902 in favour of his son José Francisco da Horta Machado da Franca.

The Count's second marriage, to Maria Teresa Pollock, produced, among other children, João Carlos da Horta Machado da Franca, Count of Selir, and António José Horta Machado da Franca, 1st Count of Marim.

=== Properties ===
The House of the Counts of Alte stands in Alte, in the municipality of Loulé. Engravings from the 18th and 19th centuries show that the site was previously occupied by the guardhouse buildings. On 10 July 1869 the building, then the property of the 1st Count of Alte, was acquired by the state to house the offices of the Civil Government of Faro. Since 2009 it has housed the Cândido Guerreiro and Counts of Alte Museum Centre, which holds the collection of the poet Cândido Guerreiro and other objects of local interest.

== Coat of arms ==
The family's arms are: quarterly, first Horta, second Franca, third Machado, and fourth quarterly Teles and Silva.

== Counts of Alte (1868) ==
#	Holder	Dates	Titles	Notes	Ref.
1	João Carlos da Horta Teles Machado da Franca	1810–1891	1st Count of Alte (1st Viscount of Alte)	Raised to count by decree of 4 June 1868 and royal letter of 12 September 1870 from King Luís I; peer of the Realm by royal letter of 29 December 1881. Father of the Count of Selir, the 1st Count of Marim and the 2nd Viscount of Alte. Married in 1840 Henriqueta Mangin Browne, daughter of Aquila Browne and Mary Mangin; later married Maria Teresa Pollock.	

== Claimants under the Republic ==
After the establishment of the Republic in 1910, the state ceased to grant titles of nobility. Since then, the following members of the family have claimed to represent the title:

#	Name	Dates	Titles claimed	Notes	Ref.
2	João Carlos da Franca de Horta Machado	1905–1993	2nd Count of Alte (2nd Count of Marim; Viscount of Alte; Count of Selir)	Son of the 1st Count of Marim and grandson of the 1st Count of Alte; born in Cascais on 2 September 1905. Married in 1933, in Porto, Maria Teresa Leite Pereira de Melo Ferreira Pinto Basto.	
3	António José Maria Gonçalo da Franca de Horta Machado	b. 1938	3rd Count of Alte	Son of the preceding; born in Rio de Mouro, Sintra, on 19 January 1938. A priest of the Society of Jesus.	

== Gallery ==
Tomb of the Count of Alte in Prazeres Cemetery, Lisbon (2025)

José Francisco da Horta Machado da Franca, 2nd Viscount of Alte (1903)

== See also ==
- Viscount of Alte
- Count of Marim
- Count of Selir
- List of countships in Portugal
- List of viscountcies in Portugal
