= Count of Selir =

- Creation date: 20 May 1886
- Created by: Luís I of Portugal
- Peerage: Kingdom of Portugal
- First holder: João Carlos da Horta Machado da Franca
- Last holder: João Carlos da Horta Machado da Franca (monarchy abolished)
- Present holder: Francisco José Simões de Almeida da Franca de Horta Machado (claimant)
- Remainder to: Life grant (one life)
- Extinction date: 1910 (monarchy abolished)

Count of Selir (in portuguese: Conde de Selir) was a Portuguese title of nobility created by King Luís I, by decree of 20 May 1886, in favour of João Carlos da Horta Machado da Franca, a diplomat, who was its only holder.

The Count of Selir was the son of João Carlos da Horta Teles Machado da Franca, 1st Viscount and 1st Count of Alte, and the brother of António José Horta Machado da Franca, 1st Count of Marim, and of José Francisco da Horta Machado da Franca, 2nd Viscount of Alte.

== History ==
João Carlos da Horta Machado da Franca was born in London on 20 July 1857, the second son of the second marriage of the 1st Viscount and Count of Alte, to Maria Teresa Pollock.

A law graduate of the University of Coimbra, he entered the diplomatic service as an attaché at the embassy to the Holy See and then served successively as second and first secretary in Vienna, Rio de Janeiro, Madrid and Paris. Promoted to minister plenipotentiary, he was posted to The Hague, where he remained for several years, and in 1908 he was sent to serve in the same capacity in Rio de Janeiro. There he fell ill and was forced to return to Lisbon, where he died shortly afterwards, in the parish of Coração de Jesus, on 15 December 1910, unmarried and without issue. He held the grand cross and commander's rank of several Portuguese and foreign orders.

He was granted the title of Count of Selir by decree of 20 May 1886 from King Luís I.

== Coat of arms ==
The family's arms are: quarterly, first Horta, second Franca, third Machado, and fourth quarterly Teles and Silva.

== Counts of Selir (1886) ==
#	Holder	Dates	Titles	Notes	Ref.
1	João Carlos da Horta Machado da Franca	1857–1910	1st Count of Selir	Second son of the 1st Count of Alte's second marriage; born in London and died in Lisbon. Count by decree of 20 May 1886 from King Luís I. Died unmarried and without issue.	

== Claimants under the Republic ==
After the establishment of the Republic in 1910, the state ceased to grant titles of nobility. Since then, the following members of the family have claimed to represent the title:

#	Name	Dates	Titles claimed	Notes	Ref.
2	João Carlos da Franca de Horta Machado	1905–1993	2nd Count of Selir (2nd Count of Alte; 2nd Count of Marim; 3rd Viscount of Alte)	Nephew of the preceding, son of the 1st Count of Marim; born in Cascais on 2 September 1905. Married in 1933, in Porto, Maria Teresa Leite Pereira de Melo Ferreira Pinto Basto.	
3	Joaquim Augusto Maria de Mello da Franca de Horta Machado	b. 1942	3rd Count of Selir (5th Viscount of Alte)	Son of the preceding; born in Lisbon on 26 May 1942. Married in 1969, in Alvor, Maria Teresa Simões de Almeida.	
4	Francisco José Simões de Almeida da Franca de Horta Machado	b. 1971	4th Count of Selir	Son of the preceding; born in Lisbon, in the parish of São Sebastião da Pedreira, on 24 November 1971.	

== See also ==
- Count of Alte
- Viscount of Alte
- Count of Marim
- List of countships in Portugal
- List of viscountcies in Portugal
