= Antonio de Puga =

Spanish painter

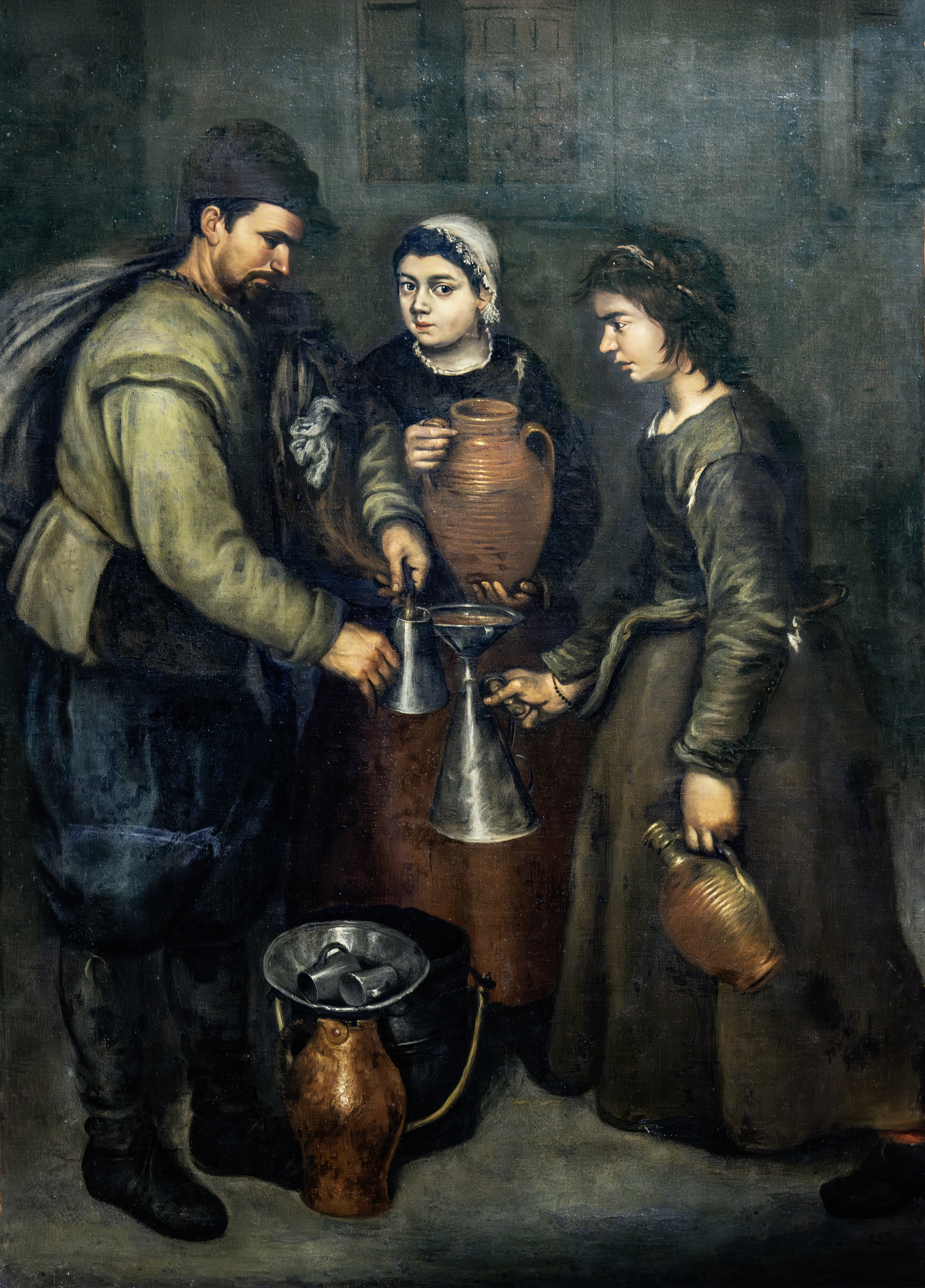
Oil Peddler by Antonio de Puga, Goya Museum, 1640

Antonio de Puga (1602–1648), was a Spanish Baroque painter.

Antonio de Puga was born in Ourense, son of a tailor of the same name and Ynés Rodriguez. He was the first notable artist from Galicia, and through the research of Maria Luisa Caturla, his main biographer and scholar, an accurate dating of some aspects of his life has been possible.

There was no news of his life after his birth records until 1635, where a document declared that he worked "By order and in house Painter Eugenio Caxés was his late majesty in quadros of good retirement and gave me quenta than Rs Ducientos trabaxe it." In the decoration of the Hall of Realms in the Buen Retiro Palace Eugenio Cajés corresponded to two of the paintings of battles: The Cadereita and his army, now lost, and the Recovery of Puerto Rico by D. Juan de Haro, Museo del Prado, who, dying in December 1634, left unfinished, supplementing Luis Fernández. It has been discussed how much might assume de Puga's work was included in these tables, there is some consensus in attributing the landscape.

Some historians have tried to fill the gap until 1635 assuming documentary would ecclesiastical studies before turning to painting, but what of that will be seen in 1634 is that Puga was already a trained painter, as he had done a portrait of the Duke of Medina de las Torres Luis Ramirez de Haro and his participation had given some importance in the decoration of the palace. Of that will be seen, too, which was established in Madrid working occasionally as an assistant to Caxés, who may be his teacher. In 1636 he painted St. Jerome (Bowes Museum in Barnard Castle), very similar to another of Francisco Collantes.

In 1641 the ambassador of Modena in Madrid, Camilo Guidi, in a letter to his master praised de Puga when he completed landscapes with equestrian portraits. Also it was mentioned a significant number of portraits were completed, usually smudges that serve as models for the various copies made at the workshop. With the portraits of Philip IV of Spain (and horse heads) and other members of the royal family, are cited portraits of various members of the nobility (counts of Lemos, Duke of Aricoste) for those he worked with some regularity. Thus in 1643 a charge for unspecified paintings and flag he had made for the Marquis of Viana, governor of Oran, who still had a debt with him at the time of issuing the second will. Of this document, written in 1648, on the eve of his death, and the subsequent auction of its assets had gathered shows that a significant number of works by other artists, and a respectable library of more than a hundred volumes, which along with the usual works of devotion and the office's own poetic works are comedies that seem to indicate a high level of culture. Mention in the paper is made of three officers who worked for him, pointing to the existence of a workshop with a large volume of work.
