= Vilafrancada =

Uprising by Prince Miguel in Vila Franca de Xira in 1823

Vilafrancada was an uprising led by Prince Miguel in Vila Franca de Xira on 27 May 1823.

== Origins ==
The liberal regime established in Portugal by the Liberal Revolution of 1820 did not enjoy the confidence of more traditional elements of society, which demanded the return of absolutism. At the head of this tendency stood Queen Carlota Joaquina, wife of John VI of Portugal, who had been exiled to Queluz after refusing to swear allegiance to the Constitution of 1822 and her third son, Prince Miguel.

== The uprising ==
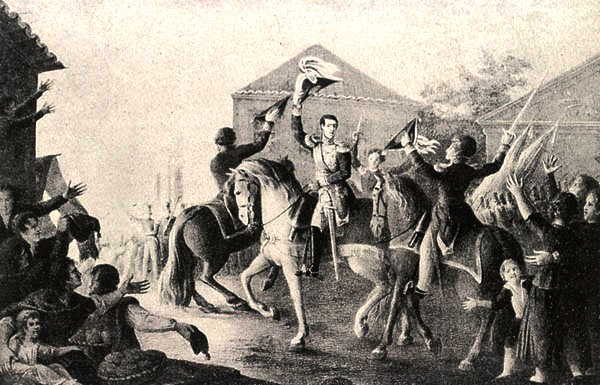
Prince Miguel saluting soldiers on arrival at Vila Franca.

The year 1823 gave the absolutists the opportunity they sought to end the liberal regime in Portugal. In that year the Holy Alliance authorised a French invasion of Spain to bring down the liberal government in Madrid and restore Ferdinand VII of Spain. This encouraged an absolutist uprising by the count of Amarante in the north of Portugal and led the party of the Queen to open revolt, confident of French support. On 23 May Prince Miguel went to Vila Franca where he was joined by the 23rd Regiment of Infantry that had been sent to Almeida to reinforce the frontier town against being taken by the rebels.

With the Queen and Prince Miguel prepared to force him to abdicate if necessary, John VI eventually decided to take command of the revolt himself, encouraged by the rising of the 18th Infantry Regiment which presented itself at Bemposta Palace to acclaim him as absolute ruler. He left for Vila Franca, obliged Prince Miguel to submit, and returned to Lisbon in triumph.

The Cortes disbanded and various liberal politicians went into exile as the absolutist regime was restored. The King managed to prevent the ultra-reactionary faction from coming to power, but the Queen's party continued its intrigues, and less than a year later a new absolutist rebellion broke out, the April Revolt, which ended with Prince Miguel going into exile.

== The proclamation ==
On 27 May 1823, at the beginning of the uprising, Prince Miguel issued the following proclamation from Vila Franca:

”Men of Portugal: It is time to break the iron yoke in which we live ... The strength of national ills, already without limits, leaves me no choice (...)”
In place of the long-established national rights which they promised you would recover on August 24, 1820, they gave you ruin and the King has been reduced to a mere ghost; (...) that to which you owe your glory in the lands of Africa and the seas of Asia, has been reduced to baseness and stripped of the brilliance that had once possessed from royal recognition; religion and its ministers, mocked and scorned (...).
I find myself in the midst of valiant and brave Portuguese, determined as I am to die or to restore to His Majesty his freedom and authority.
Do not hesitate, churchmen and citizens of all classes. Come and help the cause of religion, royalty and of you all, and swear not to kiss the royal hand again, until after His Majesty is restored to his authority.

== The medal of loyalty ==
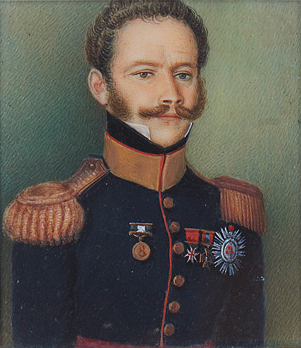
Portrait of an official who supported Prince Miguel during the Liberal Wars wearing the Medal of Loyalty to King and Country (large medal on the right of the painting)

To commemorate the uprising a "Medal of Loyalty to King and Country" was instituted, humorously referred to by Liberals as the “medal of dust.” The medal was intended to honour those who had joined John VI at Vila Franca or Prince Miguel At Santarém, or who had joined the forces of Manuel da Silveira Pinto da Fonseca Teixeira, Count of Amarante, later made marquês de Chaves.
