= Count of Marim =

- Creation date: 13 September 1897
- Created by: Carlos I of Portugal
- Peerage: Kingdom of Portugal
- First holder: António José Maria da Franca e Horta Machado
- Last holder: António José Maria da Franca e Horta Machado (monarchy abolished)
- Present holder: António José Maria Gonçalo da Franca de Horta Machado (claimant)
- Remainder to: Life grant (one life)
- Extinction date: 1910 (monarchy abolished)

Count of Marim (in portuguese: Conde de Marim) was a Portuguese title of nobility created by King Carlos I, by decree of 13 September 1897, in favour of António José Maria da Franca e Horta Machado da Cunha Mendonça e Melo Ribadeneyra e Aragão Corte-Real, a law graduate and diplomat. The title was granted for life.

The 1st Count of Marim was the son of João Carlos da Horta Teles Machado da Franca, 1st Viscount and 1st Count of Alte, and the brother of João Carlos da Horta Machado da Franca, 1st Count of Selir, and of José Francisco da Horta Machado da Franca, 2nd Viscount of Alte.

== History ==
António José Maria da Franca e Horta Machado was born in Rome, at the Portuguese legation to the Holy See, on 28 June 1861, the son of the second marriage of the 1st Viscount and Count of Alte to Mary Theresa Pollock. The family descended in the male line from Rui Horta, of Aragonese origin, and one of his great-grandfathers, João Carlos de Miranda e Horta Machado, was the 2nd administrator of the entail of Torre de Marim, in Faro.

A law graduate, he pursued a diplomatic career, from which he resigned in 1910, and was a commander of the Order of Christ, of the Spanish Order of Isabella the Catholic and of the Norwegian Order of St. Olav. He was granted the title of Count of Marim by decree of 13 September 1897 from King Carlos I. He died in Coimbra on 19 June 1929.

He married twice: first, on 1 June 1896, Adelaide Sofia Van-Zeller (1866–1897), daughter of Eduardo Van-Zeller and Isabel Caims, with whom he had no children; and secondly, on 20 May 1899, Margarida Maria José de Jesus Francisca Xavier de Mendoça Rolim de Moura Barreto, born on 25 October 1865, daughter of Augusto Pedro de Mendoça Rolim de Moura Barreto, 3rd Count of Azambuja, and of Maria da Assunção Ferreira.

== Coat of arms ==
The family's arms are: quarterly, first Horta, second Franca, third Machado, and fourth quarterly Teles and Silva.

== Counts of Marim (1897) ==
| # | Holder | Dates | Titles | Notes | Ref. |
|---|---|---|---|---|---|
| 1 | António José Maria da Franca e Horta Machado | 1861–1929 | 1st Count of Marim | Son of the 1st Viscount and Count of Alte. Count by decree of 13 September 1897 from King Carlos I. | |

== Claimants under the Republic ==
After the establishment of the Republic in 1910, the state ceased to grant titles of nobility. Since then, the following members of the family have claimed to represent the title:

| # | Name | Dates | Titles claimed | Notes | Ref. |
|---|---|---|---|---|---|
| 2 | João Carlos da Franca de Horta Machado | 1905–1993 | 2nd Count of Marim (2nd Count of Alte; Viscount of Alte; 1st Count of Selir) | Son of the preceding; born in Cascais on 2 September 1905. Married in 1933, in Porto, Maria Teresa Leite Pereira de Melo Ferreira Pinto Basto. | |
| 3 | António José Maria Gonçalo da Franca de Horta Machado | b. 1938 | 3rd Count of Marim | Son of the preceding; born in Rio de Mouro, Sintra, on 19 January 1938. A priest of the Society of Jesus. | |

== See also ==
- Count of Alte
- Viscount of Alte
- Count of Selir
- List of countships in Portugal
- List of viscountcies in Portugal
