= Viscount of Alte =

- Creation date: 26 November 1851
- Created by: Maria II of Portugal
- Peerage: Kingdom of Portugal
- First holder: João Carlos da Horta Teles Machado da Franca
- Last holder: José Francisco da Horta Machado da Franca (monarchy abolished)
- Present holder: Joaquim Augusto Maria de Mello da Franca de Horta Machado (claimant)
- Remainder to: Life grant (renewed once, in 1902)
- Extinction date: 1910 (monarchy abolished)

Viscount of Alte (in portuguese: Visconde de Alte) was a Portuguese title of nobility created by Queen Maria II, by decree of 26 November 1851 and royal letter of 16 February 1853, in favour of João Carlos da Horta Teles Machado da Franca, later 1st Count of Alte. The title was granted for life and renewed once, by King Carlos I, in favour of the 1st Viscount's son, José Francisco da Horta Machado da Franca.

The 1st Viscount was raised to Count of Alte in 1868. Two of his sons received titles of their own: João Carlos da Horta Machado da Franca, Count of Selir, and António José Horta Machado da Franca, 1st Count of Marim.

== History ==
The 1st Viscount, João Carlos da Horta Teles Machado da Franca, was born on 6 August 1810 and was a diplomat and peer of the Realm. He was granted the title of Viscount of Alte, for life and in reward for his father's services, by decree of 26 November 1851 and royal letter of 16 February 1853 from Queen Maria II, and was raised to the rank of Grandee as Count of Alte by decree of 4 June 1868 and royal letter of 12 September 1870 from King Luís I.

The 2nd Viscount, José Francisco da Horta Machado da Franca, was born in London on 1 May 1863, the fourth child of the 1st Viscount's second marriage, to Maria Teresa Pollock. A law graduate, he pursued a diplomatic career and was Portugal's envoy extraordinary and minister plenipotentiary in Washington, where he married an American, Emma Colman, with whom he had no children. He was also envoy extraordinary and minister plenipotentiary in Saint Petersburg and Mexico, a grand cross of the Order of Christ and a commander of the Spanish Order of Charles III and the Belgian Order of Leopold.

King Carlos I granted him the title of 2nd Viscount of Alte, for life, by royal letter registered in the Torre do Tombo on 28 January 1902. He died in Bar Harbor, Maine, United States, on 3 October 1933.

== Coat of arms ==
The family's arms are: quarterly, first Horta, second Franca, third Machado, and fourth quarterly Teles and Silva.

== Viscounts of Alte (1851) ==
#	Holder	Dates	Titles	Notes	Ref.
1	João Carlos da Horta Teles Machado da Franca	1810–1891	1st Viscount of Alte (1st Count of Alte)	Viscount for life by decree of 26 November 1851 and royal letter of 16 February 1853 from Queen Maria II; raised to Count of Alte by decree of 4 June 1868 and royal letter of 12 September 1870 from King Luís I. Married in 1840 Henriqueta Mangin Browne, daughter of Aquila Browne and Mary Mangin; later married Maria Teresa Pollock.	
2	José Francisco da Horta Machado da Franca	1863–1933	2nd Viscount of Alte	Fourth child of the preceding; born in London (1 May 1863) and died in Bar Harbor, Maine. Diplomat, minister plenipotentiary in Saint Petersburg, Washington and Mexico. Title renewed for life by royal letter of King Carlos I registered in the Torre do Tombo on 28 January 1902. Married Emma Colman, an American, with whom he had no issue.	

== Claimants under the Republic ==
After the establishment of the Republic in 1910, the state ceased to grant titles of nobility. Since then, the following members of the family have claimed to represent the title:

#	Name	Dates	Titles claimed	Notes	Ref.
3	João Carlos da Franca de Horta Machado	1905–1993	3rd Viscount of Alte (2nd Count of Alte; 2nd Count of Marim; 2nd Count of Selir)	Nephew of the preceding, son of the 1st Count of Marim; born in Cascais on 2 September 1905. Married in 1933, in Porto, Maria Teresa Leite Pereira de Melo Ferreira Pinto Basto, daughter of Joaquim Augusto Leite Pereira Ferreira Pinto Basto and of Maria das Dores Ribeiro de Faria.	
4	António José Maria Gonçalo da Franca de Horta Machado	b. 1938	4th Viscount of Alte	Son of the preceding; born in Rio de Mouro, Sintra, on 19 January 1938. A priest of the Society of Jesus.	
5	Joaquim Augusto Maria de Mello da Franca de Horta Machado	b. 1942	5th Viscount of Alte (Count of Selir)	Brother of the preceding; born in Lisbon on 26 May 1942. Married in 1969, in Alvor, Maria Teresa Simões de Almeida.	

== Gallery ==
José Francisco da Horta Machado da Franca, 2nd Viscount of Alte (1903)

== See also ==
- Count of Alte
- Count of Marim
- Count of Selir
- List of countships in Portugal
- List of viscountcies in Portugal
