= Almendra, Portugal =

Civil parish in Vila Nova de Foz Côa, Portugal

Almendra
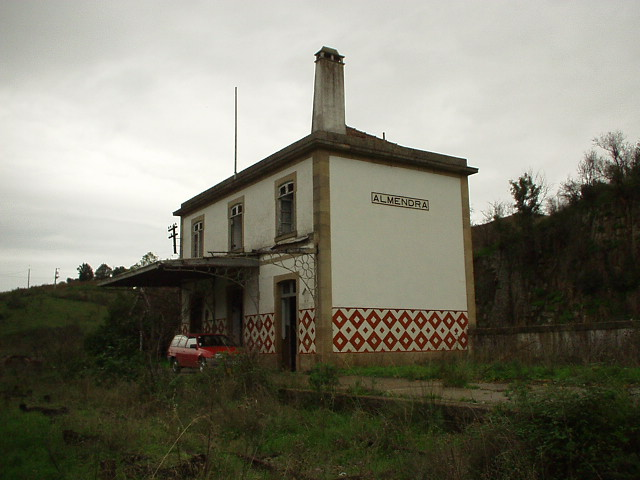
- Almendra former train station
- Interactive map of Almendra
- Country: Portugal
- Municipality: Vila Nova de Foz Côa

Area
  - Total: 0.7654 km^{2} (0.2955 sq mi)

Population (2021)
  - Total: 308

Almendra is a civil parish in the municipality of Vila Nova de Foz Côa, Portugal.

The name likely derives from the area's almond groves, as "almendra" translates to "almond." The 2021 census recorded the civil parish's population as 308, down from 383 in 2011.

Almendra is located near the Douro River. The village predates Roman settlement. The parish church has a Romanesque structure and a preserved 16th century interior. Another important monument is the manor house of the Viscounts of Banho.

== See also ==
- Fregeneda–Almendra pegmatitic field
