= Diogo José de Noronha =

Diogo José António de Noronha Camões de Albuquerque Moniz e Sousa, 8th Count of Vila Verde (Lisbon, July 1747 - Lisbon, 18 November 1806), was a Portuguese noble, Ambassador and "Ministro assistente ao despacho" (Prime Minister) (1804-06).

== Biography ==
Born in an illustrious noble house, he was the son of Dom Pedro José de Noronha Camões de Albuquerque Moniz e Sousa (pt), 3rd Marquis of Angeja, 4th Count of Vila Verde, and his second wife Dona Maria de Lorena, daughter of Manuel Teles da Silva, 3rd Marquis of Alegrete..

He spent a brief period in the army, reaching the rank of captain in the Cais Cavalry Regiment. He subsequently transitioned into the diplomatic service. On 29 January 1781, he was appointed Envoy Extraordinary and Minister Plenipotentiary to the Holy See, where he remained until 30 September 1787.. From there he traveled to Madrid, where he became ambassador on 20 October 1787. He remained in this important post until November 1798, alternating with Chargé d'affaires Diogo de Carvalho e Sampayo. His period as ambassador coincided with the War of the First Coalition against the French Revolution, in which Portugal and Spain were allies until 1795. He received the Spanish Order of the Golden Fleece for his services.

Back in Portugal, he held various high-ranking positions, including Councilor of State, Gentleman of His Majesty's Chamber, Councilor of the Royal Treasury, Inspector of the Commission for Roman Affairs, Secretary of State for the House of Braganza, President of the Royal Board of Trade, and Deputy of the Casa do Infantado* (the estate of the Infante).

On 15 April 1804, he became "Ministro assistente ao despacho" (prime minister) of the kingdom, which he remained until his death in 1806.

He died unmarried and without issue.

=== Awards ===
He was a Grand Cross of the Order of Santiago, a Knight of the Order of the Golden Fleece (Spain), and a member of the Legion of Honour. His title was confirmed by a royal charter issued on 3 May 1799, by the Prince Regent, Dom João. He served as honorary president of the "Royal Maritime, Military, and Geographical Society" and was elected a supernumerary member of the Royal Academy of Sciences of Lisbon on 16 January 1780, later becoming an honorary member on 30 January 1789.
