= Count of Viana =

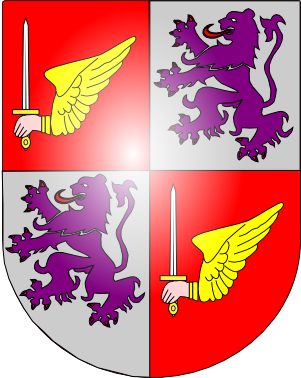
Coat of Arms of the Manoel family, Counts and Marquesses of Viana.

Count of Viana (in Portuguese Conde de Viana) was a Portuguese title of nobility granted on February 8, 1692, by King Peter II of Portugal to D. José de Menezes (grandson of Pedro de Menezes, 2nd. Count of Cantanhede), the King's master-stableman, who died without issue.

This title was granted again, by Prince regent John, on May 13, 1810, to D. João Manoel de Menezes, son of Domingas Manoel de Noronha, 3rd. Marquesse of Tancos.

The 2nd. Count had his title upgraded to Marquis by King John VI royal decree issued on July 3, 1821, (D. João VI).

== List of counts of Viana (1692) ==
1. José de Menezes (c.1660-1713), no issue
2. João Manoel de Menezes (1783–1831), 2nd. Count of Viana (1810) e 1st. Marquis of Viana (1821)
3. João Paulo Manoel de Menezes (1810–1890), 2nd. Marquis of Viana

For the following counts see Marquis of Viana

== See also ==
- Marquis of Viana
- List of countships in Portugal

== Bibliography ==
"Nobreza de Portugal e Brasil" Vol III, pages 480 e 481. Published by Zairol, Lda., Lisbon, 1989.
