= Count of Azinhaga =

- Coronet of a Portuguese count
- Creation date: 18 May 1849 (decree); 31 December 1866 (letters patent)
- Created by: Maria II of Portugal
- First holder: Francisco de Paula de Saldanha Oliveira e Daun
- Last holder: Francisco de Paula de Saldanha Oliveira e Daun (monarchy abolished)
- Present holder: António Neto de Saldanha de Oliveira e Sousa (claimant)
- Remainder to: For one life
- Extinction date: 1910 (monarchy abolished)

The Count of Azinhaga (in Portuguese: Conde da Azinhaga) was a Portuguese title of nobility created by Queen Maria II by decree of 18 May 1849 for Francisco de Paula de Saldanha Oliveira e Daun. The name refers to the former entailed estate of the Quinta da Azinhaga, founded by Cristóvão Juzarte, whose representation passed to the House of the Morgados of Oliveira, later the Marquises of Rio Maior. The title was granted for life, and the corresponding letters patent were issued on 31 December 1866, during the reign of Luís I.

== History ==
Francisco de Paula de Saldanha Oliveira e Daun was born on 21 February 1799 and died in Lisbon on 14 December 1881. He was the second-youngest child of the 1st Counts of Rio Maior, João Vicente de Saldanha Oliveira e Sousa Juzarte Figueira and Dona Maria Amália de Carvalho e Daun, a daughter of the 1st Marquis of Pombal. He was a moço fidalgo with service at court, by inheritance from his ancestors, and graduated in law from the University of Coimbra.

He entered the diplomatic service in 1824 as an attaché at the embassy in Vienna. In 1828 he was appointed legation secretary in the Netherlands and in 1829 transferred to Naples, but took up neither post, as he was on a special mission in Turin from 14 December 1829 until the end of August 1833. His service between 1828 and 1833 was not counted, and he was readmitted in 1842 as a first attaché on the reserve list. He became chargé d'affaires in Copenhagen from 23 December 1843, and was later transferred to Brussels and The Hague, where he was promoted to minister resident in 1847. Appointed envoy extraordinary and minister plenipotentiary to Saint Petersburg, he served in that capacity in Paris from 1851 to 1852 and in Madrid from 1853 to 1857.

He was appointed a Peer of the Realm by royal letter of 5 March 1853, taking the oath and his seat in the Chamber of Peers on 7 March. He was a Commander of the Order of Christ, a Knight of the Order of Saint John of Jerusalem, Grand Cross of the Order of Charles III and of the Order of Isabella the Catholic, Grand Officer of the Order of Leopold and Commander of the Order of the Netherlands Lion.

On 9 January 1867 he married Dona Emília Carolina Ana de Almeida Ribeiro Neves, born on 16 February 1831, daughter of António Joaquim Ribeiro Neves, a fidalgo of the Royal Household, merchant, financier and landowner, and his wife, Dona Maria Carolina Francisca de Almeida Grandela. He left no children.

== Arms ==
The arms adopted by the 1st Count were quarterly, combining the arms of Saldanha; of Sousa do Prado and Sousa Chichorro; of Oliveira of the entail of Oliveira, the family's male line; and, in the fourth quarter, per pale, those of Correia and of Carvalho of the entail of Carvalho. The crest was a silver eagle holding a gold key in its beak and, in its talons, a scroll bearing the motto VERITAS OMNIUM VICTRIX. This alluded to the family's descent from Dona María de Bobadilla, wife of Diogo de Saldanha, a Castilian nobleman who came to Portugal in the reign of Afonso V.

Later holders used the arms of the Counts and Marquises of Rio Maior.

== Count of Azinhaga (1849) ==
#	Holder	Dates	Titles	Notes	Ref.
1	Francisco de Paula de Saldanha Oliveira e Daun	1799–1881	1st Count of Azinhaga	Diplomat and Peer of the Realm (1853). Title granted for life by decree of 18 May 1849, with letters patent of 31 December 1866. Died without issue.	

== Claimants under the Republic ==
Following the establishment of the Republic in 1910, the state stopped granting titles of nobility. Since then, the following members of the family have claimed to represent the title:

#	Name	Dates	Titles claimed	Notes	Ref.
2	José Pedro de Saldanha Oliveira e Sousa	1904–1986	2nd Count of Azinhaga	Son of the 2nd Marquis of Rio Maior. An agronomist and writer, he belonged to several institutions, including the Portuguese Institute of Heraldry, the Lisbon Geographic Society and the Portuguese Red Cross.	
3	João Vicente de Saldanha Oliveira e Sousa	1930–2025	3rd Count of Azinhaga	Son of the preceding. An agronomist, he promoted fruit growing and chaired the first administrative committee of the municipal council of Golegã after the Carnation Revolution.	
4	António Neto de Saldanha de Oliveira e Sousa	b. 1964	4th Count of Azinhaga	Son of the preceding. Managing director of Casa Cadaval. In September 2026 he took part in an episode of the SIC television segment Sangue Azul (Blue Blood).	
