= Count of Penela =

Coat of Arms of the Counts of Penela (1st creation).

Count of Penela (Portuguese: Conde de Penela) was a Portuguese title of nobility. It was created on 10 October 1471 by King Afonso V of Portugal and granted to his 4th cousin, Dom Afonso de Vasconcelos e Menezes, 1st Count of Penela.

Dom Afonso was closely related to the Portuguese royal family; once his great-grandfather was Infante John of Portugal (son of Peter I of Portugal and Inês de Castro).

== Genealogy summary ==
                               Pedro I
                             (1320–1367)
                           King of Portugal
                                 |
       __________________________|.............................
       |                         |                            :
       |                         |                            :
   Fernando I               Infante João                   João I
  (1345–1383)               (1349–1397)                  (1357–1433)
King of Portugal      Duke of Valencia de Campos       King of Portugal
       |                   (Spanish title)                    |
       |                         :                            |
       |                         :                            |
       |                         :                            |
   Beatrice                   Afonso                      Duarte I
  (1372–1408)               (c.1370- ? )                 (1391–1438)
 Queen de jure            Lord of Cascais              King of Portugal
                                 |                            |
                                 |                            |
                                 |                            |
                      Fernando de Vasconcelos                 |
                            (c.1400- ? )                      |
                         Lord of Soalhães                     |
                                 |                            |
                                 |                            |
                                 |                            |
                       Afonso de Vasconcelos        Royal House of Portugal
                            (1441- ? )
                        1st Count of Penela

A second creation of this title occurred in December 1907, when King Charles I of Portugal granted it to José Maria de Portugal de Vasconcelos da Costa Mexia de Matos.

== List of counts of Penela ==
=== First creation (1471) ===
- Afonso de Vasconcelos e Menezes, 1st Count of Penela (born 1441)
- João de Vasconcelos e Menezes, 2nd Count of Penela (born 1470)

=== Second creation (1907) ===
- José Maria de Portugal de Vasconcelos da Costa Mexia de Matos, 3rd Count of Penela (born 1868).

== See also ==
- List of countships in Portugal

== Bibliography ==
"Nobreza de Portugal e do Brasil" – Vol. III, page 117/118. Published by Zairol Lda., Lisbon 1989.
