= Count of Peniche =

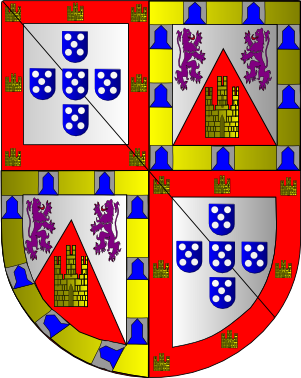
The Coat of Arms of the Noronha family, Counts of Peniche.

Count of Peniche (in Portuguese Conde de Peniche) was a Portuguese title of nobility created by a royal decree, dated from December 6, 1806, by Prince Regent John, on behalf of Queen Maria I of Portugal, and granted to Caetano José de Noronha e Albuquerque, younger son of the 3rd Marquis of Angeja and 4th Count of Vila Verde.

This collateral Branch of the House of Angeja later inherited the titles of Marquis of Angeja and Count of Vila Verde when the Noronha'a senior line was extinguished.

== List of counts of Peniche ==
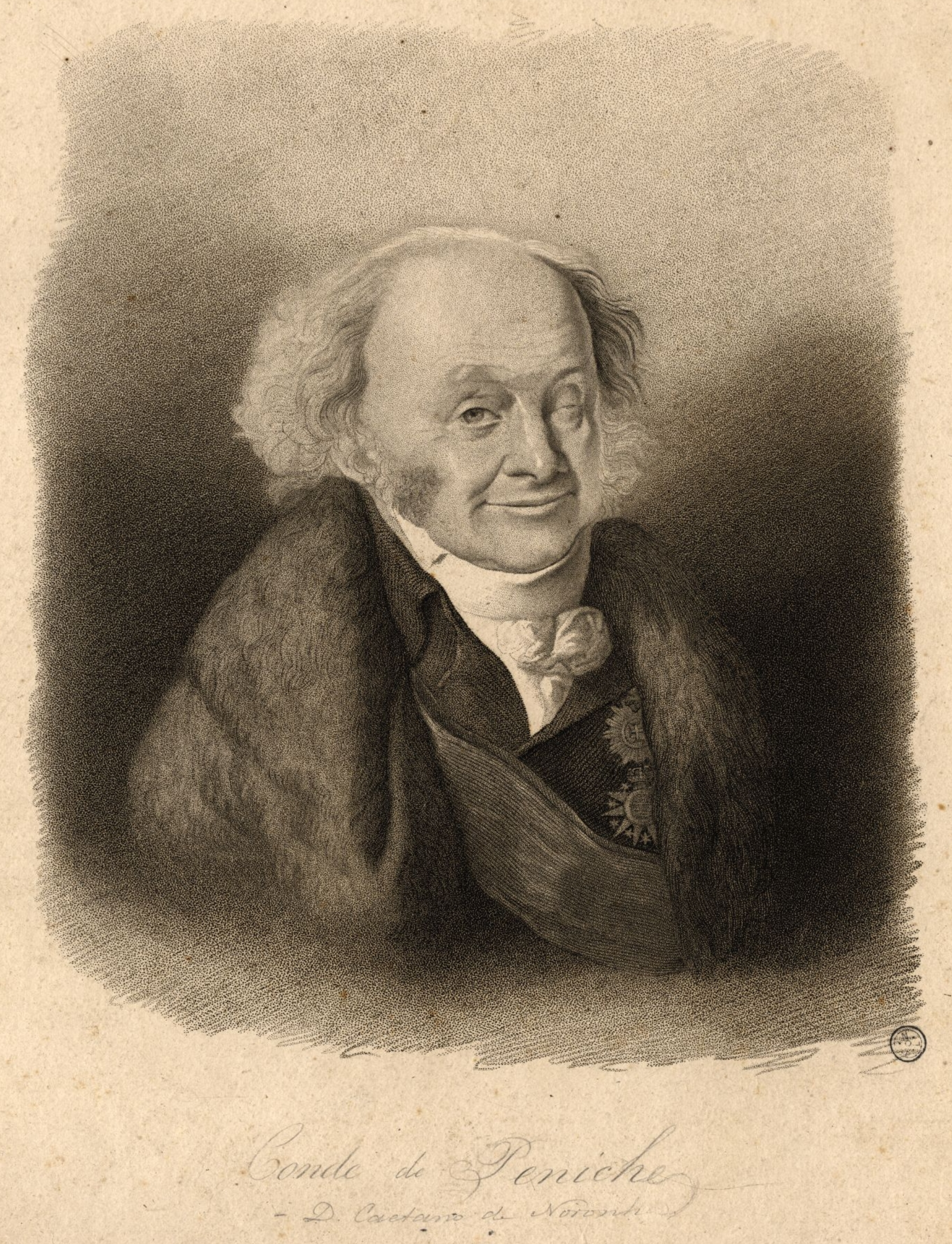

- Caetano José de Noronha e Albuquerque (1753-1829), 1st Count of Peniche;
- Manuel Lourenço de Almeida e Noronha (1788-1824), 2nd Count of Peniche;
- Caetano Gaspar de Almeida Noronha Albuquerque e Sousa (1820-1881), 3rd Count of Peniche; became 8th Marquis of Angeja in 1833 with the extinction of the Noronha's senior line;
- Maria Antónia de Almeida e Noronha (1902- ? ), 4th Countess of Peniche;
- Francisco de Almeida e Noronha Azevedo Coutinho (born 1983) – current representative of the title.

== Family name ==
The family name associated with this title was Noronha, the same used by its parent House, the Marquesses of Angeja.

== See also ==
- List of marquisates in Portugal
- List of countships in Portugal
- Marquis of Angeja
- Count of Vila Verde

== Bibliography ==
”Nobreza de Portugal e do Brasil" – Vol. III, page 122. Published by Zairol Lda., Lisbon 1989.
