= Count of Santiago de Beduído =

- Creation date: 12 November 1667
- Created by: Afonso VI of Portugal
- First holder: Dom Lourenço de Sousa da Silva e Meneses
- Last holder: Dom Joaquim de Carvalho Daun e Lorena (monarchy abolished)
- Present holder: Pedro de Carvalho Daun e Lorena (claimant)
- Extinction date: 1910 (monarchy abolished)

The Count of Santiago de Beduído (in Portuguese: Conde de Santiago de Beduído) was a Portuguese title of nobility created by letters patent of 12 November 1667 issued by King Afonso VI for Dom Lourenço de Sousa da Silva e Meneses, commander of Santiago de Beduído in the Order of Christ, a commandery that was hereditary in his family. The title took its name from Santiago de Beduído, then described as a town in the province of Beira.

The title remained with the first holder's descendants until the end of the 18th century. In the following century it passed to the House of the Marquises of Pombal through the inheritance of the family's entailed estates, and it was renewed for the last time in 1906.

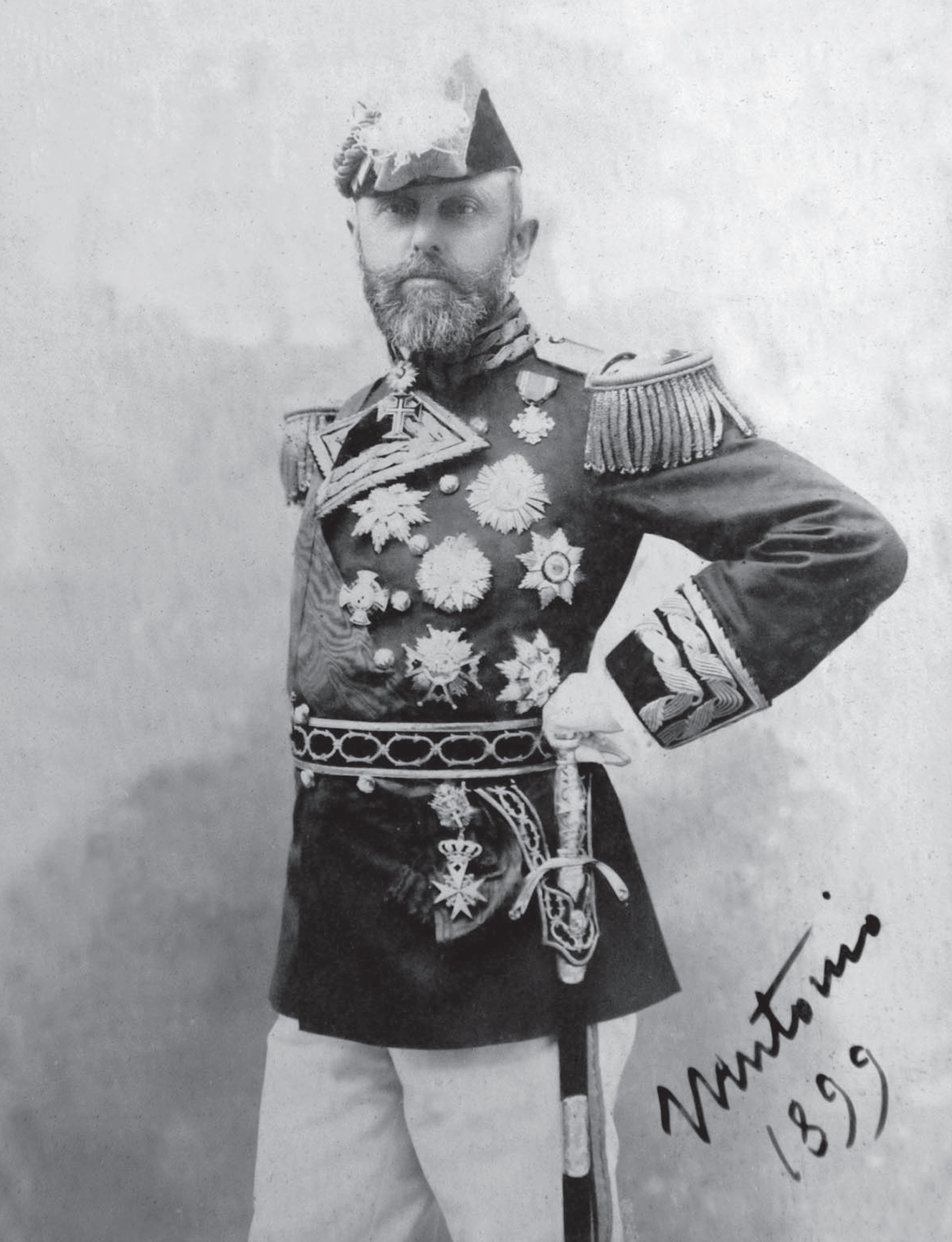
Dom António de Carvalho e Melo Daun Albuquerque e Lorena, 6th Marquis of Pombal and 5th Count of Santiago de Beduído, in the uniform and insignia of a Bailiff of the Order of Malta (1899)

== History ==
The 1st Count, Dom Lourenço de Sousa da Silva e Meneses (d. 1675), was the son of Aleixo de Sousa da Silva e Meneses and his wife, Dona Luísa de Távora. His father was the 5th aposentador-mor (royal quartermaster), lord of Alfaiates and of the crown estate (reguengo) of Arronches, and commander of Santiago de Beduído and Guilhofrei in the Order of Christ, both commanderies being hereditary in the family. His mother was the daughter of Luís de Miranda Henriques, estribeiro-mor (master of the horse), and Dona Joana Guedes, 9th lady of Murça. His father died young, before the Restoration, and by letters patent of 6 August 1637 the commandery of Santiago de Beduído was granted to the son, on condition that he pay a pension of 200 cruzados to each of the ladies of the family, his grandmother, Dona Luísa de Meneses, and his mother.

The 1st Count was the 6th aposentador-mor of the Royal Household, an office in which he served John IV, lord of the crown estate of Arronches and of Estarreja, and commander of his father's commanderies. He served in the Restoration War, first as a cavalry captain, then as mestre de campo of the terço (regiment) of Moura and finally as general of battle in the Army of the Alentejo. The title was granted to him for life, in recognition of his services on the frontiers as mestre de campo and sargento-mor de batalha and of those of his grandmother, Dona Luísa de Meneses, guarda-mor and governess (aia) to Queen Luísa de Gusmão.

The title was renewed by letters patent of 3 March 1676 for Dom Aleixo de Sousa da Silva e Meneses, 2nd Count; by letters patent of John V of 3 January 1728 for Dom Lourenço António de Sousa da Silva e Meneses (1708–1786), who became the 3rd Count; and by letters patent of Maria I of 27 July 1786 for his brother, Dom Nuno Aleixo de Sousa da Silva e Meneses (1713–1798), 4th Count, likewise for life.

By his marriage to Dona Leonor de Meneses, daughter of the 2nd Marquises of Fronteira, the 2nd Count had, besides the 3rd and 4th Counts, Dom Fernando de Sousa e Silva (1712–1786), principal of the Patriarchal Church from 1755 and 4th Patriarch of Lisbon, elected in December 1776 and consecrated on 30 May 1779; Dom Francisco Manuel de Sousa da Silva (d. 1782), monsignor and protonotary of the Patriarchal Church, father of Dona Maria Mascarenhas de Sousa da Silva e Meneses, who married Lourenço Anastácio Galvão Mexia, estribeiro-menor (deputy master of the horse) of the Royal Household; and Dona Ana Catarina de Meneses, who married Luís de Saldanha da Gama de Melo e Torres, 4th Count of Ponte.

A sister of the 3rd and 4th Counts, Dona Joana Inês Vicência de Meneses, the eldest of the siblings, was the first wife of Dom Brás Baltasar da Silveira, 1st lord of São Cosmado. Their two daughters each married Nuno Gaspar de Távora, later de Lorena, in turn, the second after the death of the first. Dom Brás Maria da Silveira e Lorena, 9th Marquis of Minas, was a great-grandson of the first daughter, while the second was the mother of Dona Francisca de Paula do Pópulo de Lorena, who married the 3rd Marquis of Pombal. On the death of the last Marchioness of Minas, Dona Francisca inherited the entailed estates of the House of Minas. On the death of Dona Luísa de Meneses, another sister of the two counts who had inherited their entailed estates, she also inherited those of the House of the Counts of Santiago de Beduído, which was thus merged into that of the Marquises of Pombal. Dona Luzia, already a lady-in-waiting to the queen in 1750, served at court until her death; she is still listed in the Almanach de Lisboa for 1802, but not in that of the following year. The entailed estates in which she had succeeded her brother Dom Nuno Aleixo included the administration of the chapel of Graça, founded by Afonso de Albuquerque, which passed by court ruling to the Marchioness of Pombal.

The title was renewed by decree of Luís I of 31 July 1865 for Dom António de Carvalho e Melo Daun Albuquerque e Lorena, great-grandson of the Marchioness Dona Francisca, de jure 8th Count of Oeiras and, by decree of 21 October 1886, 6th Marquis of Pombal, while his elder brother, the 7th Count of Oeiras, was still alive.

=== Properties ===
The Quinta Velha de Pedrouços belonged to the Counts of Santiago de Beduído, who kept it until the end of the 18th century. The 2nd Count, Dom Aleixo de Sousa da Silva e Meneses (1675–1744), inherited the estate from Dona Antónia de Sousa de Meneses. After his death the estate remained with his widow, Dona Leonor Maria Josefa de Meneses (b. 1680), and later passed to their eldest son and heir, Dom Lourenço António de Sousa da Silva e Meneses (1708–1786), 3rd Count of Santiago de Beduído and governor of the Tower of São Julião da Barra.

On the death of the 3rd Count, the estate passed to his brother, Dom Nuno Aleixo de Sousa da Silva e Meneses (1713–1798), 4th Count of Santiago de Beduído. It then passed to their sister, Dona Luísa (or Luzia) de Meneses, who in July 1797 gave it to Infanta Maria Francisca Benedita.

== Arms ==
Up to the 4th Count: quarterly, the first and fourth quarters for Sousa of Arronches and the second and third for Silva, ensigned with a count's coronet. The first and fourth quarters were themselves quarterly: the royal arms of Portugal, differenced by a bendlet sinister sable, and gules, four crescents argent (Sousa); the second and third argent, a lion purpure armed and langued azure (Silva).

From the 5th Count onwards: the arms of the Marquises of Pombal.

== Counts of Santiago de Beduído (1667) ==
#	Holder	Dates	Titles	Notes	Ref.
1	Dom Lourenço de Sousa da Silva e Meneses	d. 1675	1st Count of Santiago de Beduído	Son of Aleixo de Sousa da Silva e Meneses, 5th aposentador-mor, and Dona Luísa de Távora. Created 1st Count, for life, by letters patent of 12 November 1667 from Afonso VI. He was 6th aposentador-mor of the Royal Household, lord of the crown estate of Arronches and of Estarreja, and general of battle in the Army of the Alentejo. He married twice. His first wife, Dona Joana da Silva, lady-in-waiting to Luisa de Guzmán and daughter of the cavalry captain Luís de Saldanha da Gama and his wife, Dona Margarida de Vilhena, bore him no children. On 30 October 1667 he married Dona Luísa Maria de Mendonça e Távora, also lady-in-waiting to the same queen and daughter of the 2nd Counts of Vale de Reis, with whom he had children.	
2	Dom Aleixo de Sousa da Silva e Meneses	10 May 1675 – 29 November 1744	2nd Count of Santiago de Beduído	Eldest son of the 1st Count's second marriage. The title was renewed for him by letters patent of 3 March 1676. He was 7th aposentador-mor of the Royal Household (27 April 1695), lord of Alfaiates, Estarreja and the crown estate of Arronches, alcaide-mor of Ervededo and Alfaiates, commander of Santiago de Beduído and Santa Maria de Castelo Bom in the Order of Christ, patron of the main chapel of Santa Cruz do Castelo in Lisbon, a member of His Majesty's Council and a deputy of the Junta dos Três Estados. In April 1695 he married Dona Leonor Maria de Meneses, lady-in-waiting to Queen Maria Sofia and daughter of the 2nd Marquises of Fronteira, with whom he had 28 children, twelve of whom died in childhood.	
3	Dom Lourenço António de Sousa da Silva e Meneses	29 December 1708 – 7 February 1786	3rd Count of Santiago de Beduído	Son of the preceding. The title was renewed for him by letters patent of 3 January 1728 from John V. He was 8th aposentador-mor of the Royal Household and lord of his family's lordships, alcaidarias-mores and commanderies. He followed a military career, reaching the rank of lieutenant-general, and was governor of the Tower of São Julião da Barra and a member of the Council of War. By decree of 30 April 1762, citing his departure on campaign, he obtained a moratorium allowing him to receive for two years the revenues of his estates, which were then assigned to his creditors. On 6 January 1749 he married Dona Josefa de Noronha (11 August 1731 – November 1791), daughter of the 2nd Marquises of Angeja; they had no children.	
4	Dom Nuno Aleixo de Sousa da Silva e Meneses	17 July 1713 – 30 April 1798	4th Count of Santiago de Beduído	Second son of the 2nd Count. He was a canon of the Patriarchal Church of Lisbon and was released from holy orders in order to succeed to the family estates. He was 9th aposentador-mor and lord of all his ancestors' lordships, entailed estates, alcaidarias and commanderies. The title was renewed for him, for life, by letters patent of 27 July 1786 from Maria I. On 5 February 1788 he married Dona Francisca Leonor de Castro, daughter of the 1st Counts of Resende; they had no children.	
5	Dom António de Carvalho e Melo Daun Albuquerque e Lorena	1850–1911	5th Count of Santiago de Beduído	Born in the parish of São Mamede, Lisbon. Great-grandson of Dona Francisca da Silveira e Lorena, Marchioness of Pombal, who was a granddaughter of Dona Joana Inês Vicência de Meneses, sister of the 3rd and 4th Counts. He was also 6th Marquis of Pombal, by decree of 21 October 1886, and 8th Count of Oeiras. The title was renewed for him by decree of 31 July 1865 from Luís I, while his elder brother, the 7th Count of Oeiras, was still alive. He was a Peer of the Realm, master of ceremonies of the Royal Household, chamberlain to Ferdinand II and Carlos I, and Grand Cross of the Order of Christ. In 1873, in the private oratory of the Marquises of Pombal, he married Dona Maria do Carmo Fernandes (1858–1931), lady-in-waiting to Queen Maria Pia, and had children.	
6	Dom Joaquim de Carvalho Daun e Lorena	15 September 1878 – 20 July 1954	6th Count of Santiago de Beduído	Born in Lisbon, second son of the 6th Marquis of Pombal and brother of the 7th Marquis of Pombal. He was a legation secretary and a commander of the Order of Saint Gregory the Great of the Holy See and of the Order of the Crown of Romania. On 5 May 1924, in the private chapel of the residence of the Viscount of Santarém, he married Dona Maria Amália de Barros de Saldanha da Gama (b. Lisbon, 1 October 1879), daughter of the 2nd Viscounts of Vila Nova da Rainha; they had no children.	

== Claimants under the Republic ==
Following the establishment of the Republic in 1910, the state stopped granting titles of nobility. Since then, the following members of the family have claimed to represent the title:

#	Name	Dates	Titles claimed	Notes	Ref.
7	Sebastião José de Carvalho Daun e Lorena	b. 1903	7th Count of Santiago de Beduído	Son of the 7th Marquis of Pombal. In 1927, in Lisbon, he married his cousin Dona Maria da Nazaré Monteiro de Almeida (b. 1909), and had children.	
8	Manuel Sebastião de Almeida de Carvalho Daun e Lorena	6 February 1930 – 5 September 2021	8th Count of Santiago de Beduído	Son of the preceding. A lawyer, he was one of the seven founding partners of the Instituto de Arte e Decoração (IADE), established in 1969 by António Quadros. He leased the institute the main wing of the Barão de Quintela Palace, where he lived with his family, and in 1993 he joined its board of directors. He married Mariana João Cabral Daun e Lorena, with whom he had six children.	
9	Pedro de Carvalho Daun e Lorena	b. 1956	9th Count of Santiago de Beduído	Son of the preceding. He sat on the board of directors of IADE until the institution was sold in 2007.	
