= Count of Valadares =

The Count of Valadares (Portuguese: Conde de Valadares) is a noble title created by King Pedro II of Portugal, by royal letter on 20 June 1702, in favour of D. Miguel Luís de Menezes.

D. Miguel Luís de Menezes (born 1638 - Sacramento, Lisbon, 1 February 1714), was son of D. Carlos de Noronha (Commander of Marvão in the Order of Avis and president of the Mesa da Consciência e Ordens) and his second wife D. Ana de Menezes, bastard daughter of D. Miguel Luís de Menezes, 1st Duke of Caminha and 6th Marquis of Vila Real.

== List of counts ==
1. Miguel Luis de Menezes, 1st Count of Valadares
2. Carlos de Noronha, 2nd Count of Valadares
3. Miguel Luis de Menezes, 3rd Count of Valadares
4. Carlos de Noronha, 4th Count of Valadares
5. Álvaro de Noronha Castelo Branco, 5th Count of Valadares
6. José Luis de Menezes Castelo Branco e Abranches, 6th Count of Valadares
7. Álvaro de Noronha Abranches Castelo Branco, 1st Marquis of Torres Novas and 7th Count of Valadares
8. Pedro António de Noronha, 8th Count of Valadares
9. José António de Noronha Abranches Castelo Branco, 9th Count of Valadares
10. Maria Mafalda de Noronha Wagner, 8th Marquess of Vagos and 10th Countess of Valadares
