= Viscount of Nossa Senhora das Mercês =

Viscount of Nossa Senhora das Mercês (Portuguese: Visconde de Nossa Senhora das Mercês) was a noble title created by decree on 21 August 1879, by King Luís I (1861-1889), in favor of Cândido Pacheco de Melo Forjaz de Lacerda, 1st Baron of Nossa Senhora das Mercês, a rich landowner and politician from the island of Terceira, in the Portuguese archipelago of the Azores.

== List of viscounts ==
1. Cândido Pacheco de Melo Forjaz de Lacerda, 1st Viscount of Nossa Senhora das Mercês;
2. Cândido de Meneses Pacheco de Melo Forjaz de Lacerda, 2nd Viscount of Nossa Senhora das Mercês.

After the implementation of the first Portuguese Republic, and with the fall of the monarchy, the successor, José de Bettencourt Forjaz de Lacerda, became a pretender to the title.
