= Viscount of Cardoso da Silva =

Portuguese noble title

Viscount of Cardoso da Silva (Portuguese: Visconde de Cardoso da Silva) is a Portuguese title of nobility, created by Carlos I of Portugal in the 19th century. It was first granted to Manuel Cardoso da Silva in 1892, who was its only holder before the Portuguese monarchy was abolished in 1910.
