= Marquis of Pombal (title) =

Marquisate of Pombal
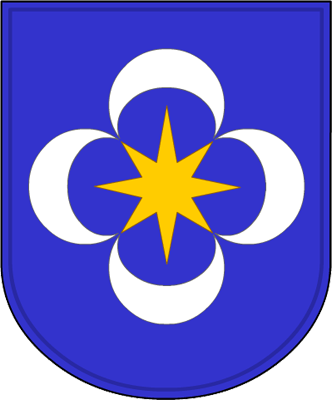
- Arms of the Marquises of Pombal
- Creation date: 16 September 1769
- Created by: Joseph I of Portugal
- Peerage: Portuguese nobility
- First holder: Sebastião José de Carvalho e Melo, 1st Marquis of Pombal
- Present holder: Sebastião José de Carvalho Daun e Lorena, 10th Marquis of Pombal
- Status: Extant

The Marquisate of Pombal (Portuguese: Marquês de Pombal) is a hereditary Portuguese title of nobility created on 16 September 1769 by King Joseph I of Portugal in favour of Sebastião José de Carvalho e Melo, 1st Marquis of Pombal, who had previously been created Count of Oeiras in 1759.

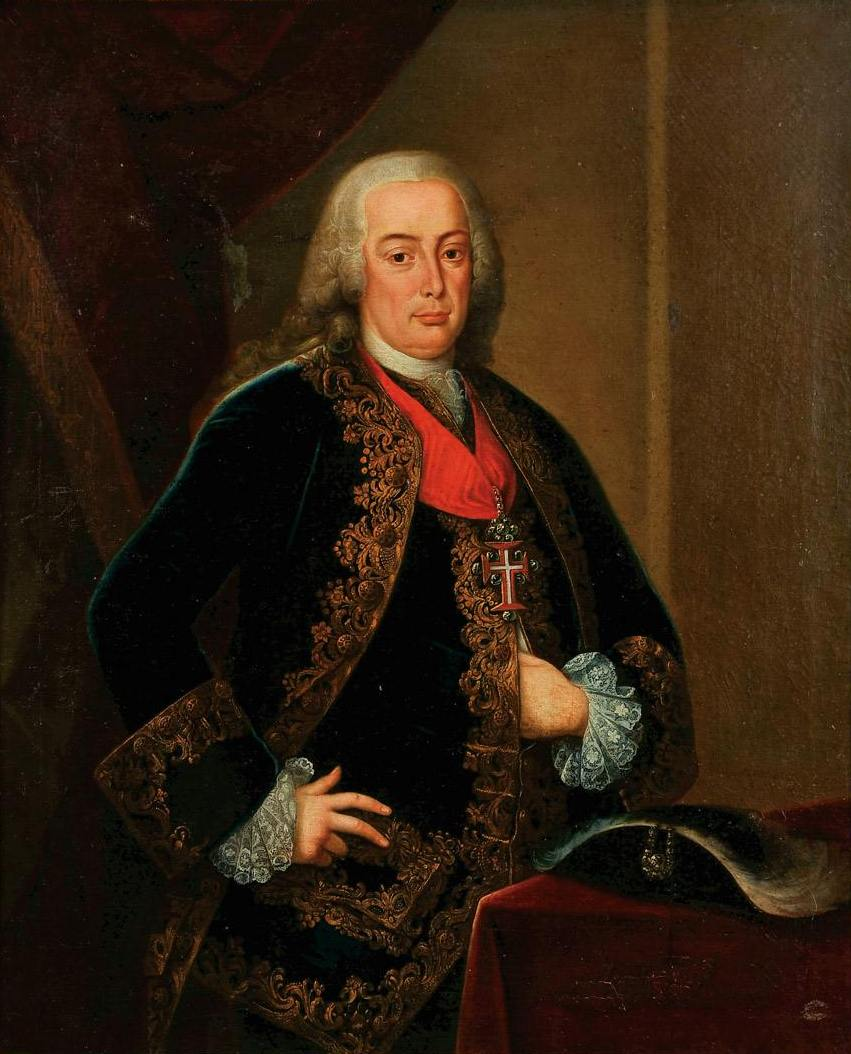
Sebastião José de Carvalho e Melo, 1st Marquis of Pombal.

The first holder was one of the leading political figures of eighteenth-century Portugal and served as chief minister during the reign of Joseph I. The marquisate was granted ten years after the creation of the County of Oeiras, which became associated with the same family.

== Marquises of Pombal ==
No.	Holder	Period
Creation by Joseph I of Portugal
I	Sebastião José de Carvalho e Melo	1769–1782
II	Henrique José de Carvalho e Melo	1782–1812
III	José Francisco Xavier Maria de Carvalho Melo e Daun	1812–1821
IV	Sebastião José de Carvalho Melo e Daun	1821–1834
V	Manuel José de Carvalho Melo e Daun de Albuquerque Sousa e Lorena	1834–1886
VI	António de Carvalho Melo e Daun de Albuquerque e Lorena	1886–1911
VII	Manuel José de Carvalho e Daun de Albuquerque e Lorena	1911–?
VIII	Sebastião José de Carvalho Daun e Lorena	?–?
IX	Manuel Sebastião de Almeida de Carvalho Daun e Lorena	?–2021
X	Sebastião José de Carvalho Daun e Lorena	2021–present

== History of the holders ==
- Sebastião José de Carvalho e Melo (1699–1782), 1st Marquis of Pombal and 1st Count of Oeiras. He was a diplomat and chief minister of Portugal under Joseph I of Portugal.
- Henrique José de Carvalho e Melo (1742–1812), 2nd Marquis of Pombal and 2nd Count of Oeiras. He was president of the Senate of the Lisbon Chamber. He died without legitimate issue and was succeeded by his brother.
- José Francisco Xavier Maria de Carvalho Melo e Daun (1753–1821), 3rd Marquis of Pombal, 3rd Count of Oeiras and 1st Count of Redinha. He was the brother of the preceding holder.
- Sebastião José de Carvalho Melo e Daun (1785–1834), 4th Marquis of Pombal, 4th Count of Oeiras and 2nd Count of Redinha.
- Manuel José de Carvalho Melo e Daun de Albuquerque Sousa e Lorena (1821–1886), 5th Marquis of Pombal and 6th Count of Oeiras.
- António de Carvalho Melo e Daun de Albuquerque e Lorena (1850–1911), 6th Marquis of Pombal, 8th Count of Oeiras and 5th Count of Santiago de Beduído. He was the first president of the Assembly of Portuguese Knights of the Sovereign Military Order of Malta, founded in 1899.
- Manuel José de Carvalho e Daun de Albuquerque e Lorena (1875–?), 7th Marquis of Pombal and 9th Count of Oeiras.
- Sebastião José de Carvalho Daun e Lorena (1903–?), 8th Marquis of Pombal, 11th Count of Oeiras and 7th Count of Santiago de Beduído.
- Manuel Sebastião de Almeida de Carvalho Daun e Lorena (1930–2021), 9th Marquis of Pombal, 12th Count of Oeiras and 8th Count of Santiago de Beduído.
- Sebastião José de Carvalho Daun e Lorena (born 1955), 10th Marquis of Pombal, 13th Count of Oeiras and 9th Count of Santiago de Beduído.

== See also ==
- Count of Oeiras
- Count of Redinha
- Count of Santiago de Beduído
- List of marquisates in Portugal
- List of countships in Portugal
- Marquis of Pombal Square

== Bibliography ==
- Zúquete, Afonso Eduardo Martins. Nobreza de Portugal e Brasil. Vol. III. 2nd ed. Lisbon: Enciclopédia, 1989.
