= Count of Bracial =

Noble title in the Kingdom of Portugal

The Count of Bracial is a noble title, created by decree on 21 December 1882, by King Luís I of Portugal, in favor of Jacinto Pais de Matos Falcão.

== List of counts ==
1. Jacinto Pais de Matos Falcão, 1st Count of Bracial
2. António Pais Champalimaud de Matos Moreira Falcão, 2nd Count of Bracial
3. António Manuel Patrício Aboim Sales, 3rd Count of Bracial
