= Marquis of Angeja =

Portuguese title of nobility

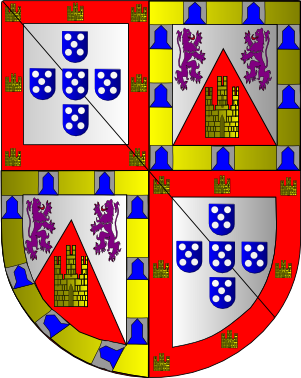
The Coat of Arms of the Noronha family, Marquesses of Angeja and Counts of Vila Verde.

Count of Vila Verde (in Portuguese Conde de Vila Verde) was a Portuguese title of nobility created by a royal decree, dated from December 10, 1654, by King John IV of Portugal, and granted to Dom António de Noronha, 12th Lord of Vila Verde.

António de Noronha descended from Pedro de Noronha, Archbishop of Lisbon and a grandson of King Fernando I of Portugal (through his mother Infanta Isabel) and of King Henry II of Castile (through his father Alfonso, Count of Noroña y Gigon).

In the 18th century this family received new honours: a royal decree of King John V of Portugal, issued on January 21, 1714, created the title of Marquis of Angeja (in Portuguese Marquês de Angeja) and granted it to Dom Pedro António de Noronha, 2nd Count of Vila Verde.

== List of counts of Vila Verde (1654) and Marquesses of Angeja (1714) ==
- António de Noronha (c.1610- ? ), 1st Count of Vila Verde;
- Pedro António de Noronha (1661–1731), 2nd Count of Vila Verde and 1st Marquis of Angeja;
- António de Noronha (1680–1735), 3rd Count of Vila Verde and 2nd Marquis of Angeja;
- Pedro José de Noronha Camões (1716–1788), 4th Count of Vila Verde and 3rd Marquis of Angeja;
- António José Xavier de Noronha Camões de Albuquerque Moniz e Sousa (1736–1755), 5th Count of Vila Verde;
- José Xavier de Noronha Camões Albuquerque Sousa Moniz (1741–1811), 6th Count of Vila Verde and 4th Marquis of Angeja;
- Pedro José de Noronha Camões de Albuquerque Moniz e Sousa (1771–1804), 7th Count of Vila Verde and 5th Marquis of Angeja;
- Diogo José António de Noronha Camões de Albuquerque Sousa Moniz (1747–1806), 8th Count of Vila Verde;
- João de Noronha Camões de Albuquerque e Sousa Moniz (1788–1827), 9th Count of Vila Verde and 6th Marquis of Angeja;
- Maria do Carmo de Noronha Camões e Albuquerque Moniz de Sousa (1813–1833), 10th Countess of Vila Verde and 7th Marchioness of Angeja;
- Caetano Gaspar de Almeida Noronha Albuquerque e Sousa (1820–1881), 3rd Count of Peniche and 8th Marquis of Angeja;
- Manuel Gaspar de Almeida Noronha Portugal Camões Albuquerque Moniz (1845–1901), 9th Marquis of Angeja;
- Pedro de Almeida e Noronha Portugal Camões Albuquerque Moniz e Sousa (1865–1908), 11th Count of Vila Verde;
- António de Almeida e Noronha Portugal Camões Albuquerque Moniz e Sousa (1856–1906), 12th Count of Vila Verde.

After the end of the monarchy in 1910, the title of Marquis of Angeja was inherited by the descendants of the Noronha family (Noronha de Azevedo Coutinho branch).

== Family name ==
The family name associated with these titles was Noronha – their ancestor Alfonso Enriquez (a natural son of King Henry II of Castile), was Count of Noroña, in Castile.

Due to different heritages and marriages some other family names were added (such as, Camões, Albuquerque Moniz e Sousa, Azevedo Coutinho) but the original Noronha was always kept.

== Genealogical summary ==
António de Noronha, 1st Count of Vila Verde, was a 6th grandson of Pedro de Noronha, Archbishop of Lisbon, who lived in the late 14th/earlier 15th centuries. The Archbishop had royal ancestry both through his mother (Isabel of Portugal, a natural daughter of King Ferdinand I of Portugal) and through his father (Alfonso, Count of Noroña y Gigón, a natural son of King Henry II of Castile).

Pedro I (1320–1367); King of Portugal
Enrique II (1333–1379); King of Castile	Fernando I (1345–1383); King of Portugal	João I (1357–1433); King of Portugal
Juan I (1358–1390); King of Castile	Alphonso Enriquez (1350–1395); Count of Noreña y Gijón	Isabel (1364–1435)	Duarte I (1391–1438); King of Portugal
Pedro of Noronha (1379–1452); Archb.of Lisbon	Fernando of Noronha (1380- ? ) Count of Vila Real
Royal House of Castile	Marquesses of Angeja	Marquis of Vila Real	Royal House of Portugal

== See also ==
- List of marquisates in Portugal
- List of countships in Portugal
- Count of Peniche

== Bibliography ==
”Nobreza de Portugal e do Brasil" – Vol. II, pages 281/284; Vol III, pages 533-538. Published by Zairol Lda., Lisbon 1989.
