= Count of Paço de Arcos =

The Count of Paço de Arcos (Portuguese: Conde dos Paço de Arcos), or alternately Count of Paço d'Arcos (Portuguese: Conde dos Paço d'Arcos) was a noble title, instituted by King Carlos I of Portugal on 13 October 1890, in favour of Carlos Eugénio Corrêa da Silva for his naval career and diplomatic service within the Portuguese Empire.

== History ==
Carlos Eugénio was a colonial marine at the age of 18, serving in China, before becoming involved in politics, where he was nominated to post of Governor of Macau and Timor in 1876. His service resulted in his appointment as Viscount of Paço d'Arcos in 1876. Following postings to Mozambique and later India, he returned to Lisbon, where he served as peer-of-the-realm, superintendent of the arsenal, and adjunct to King Luís, before being appointed as Civil Governor of Lisbon. Following his service to the Crown, and being exonerated for his position in Lisbon, Carlos Eugênio was made Count of Paço d'Arcos on 14 October 1890.

== List of counts ==
1. Carlos Eugénio Corrêa da Silva, 1st Count of Paço de Arcos (1834)
2. Henrique Paço de Arcos, 2nd Count of Paço de Arcos (1906)

With the fall of the monarchy, Henrique José Maria Roquette Corrêa da Silva, became a pretender to the title.
