= Viscount of Landal =

The Viscount of Landal (Portuguese: Visconde de Landal) is a title of nobility created by King Luís I of Portugal on 22 December 1887, in favour of Julião Casimiro Ferreira Jordão. It was attributed to three generations but, after the death of the last heir (in 1980), the title was extinguished, but its history lives on in the last viscountess's surviving children.

== List of viscounts ==
- Julião Casimiro Ferreira Jordão, 1st Viscount of Landal
- Jaime Peixoto da Silva Ferreira Jordão, 2nd Viscount of Landal
- Maria do Carmo Pereira e Sousa Peixoto Ferreira Jordão, 3rd Viscoutess of Landal; being the late Viscount's only surviving child, Maria do Carmo was confirmed in the title by the Portuguese Council of Nobility, in charge of recognizing the use of titles after the fall of the Monarchy in 1910;
- António de Sousa Vadre Castelino e Alvim, a Lisbon lawyer and pretender to the title.
