= Viscount of Amoreira da Torre =

Viscount of Amoreira da Torre (Portuguese: Visconde de Amoreira da Torre) was an aristocratic Portuguese title. The title was created in 1895, by D. Carlos I in favor of Cypriano Justino da Costa Palhinha.

== List of Viscounts of Amoreira da Torre ==
- Cypriano Justino da Costa Palhinha
