= Marquis of Viana =

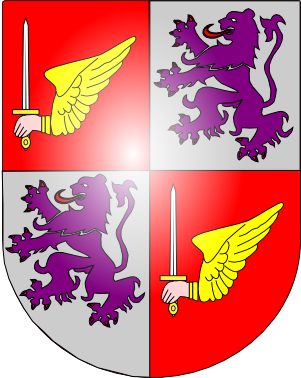
Coat of Arms of the Manoel family, Marquesses of Viana.

Marquis of Viana (in Portuguese Marquês de Viana) was a Portuguese title of nobility granted on July 3, 1821, John VI of Portugal to D. João Manoel de Menezes, who already was 2nd Count of Viana, a son of Domingos Manoel de Noronha, 3rd Marquess of Tancos.

== List of marquesses of Viana (1821) ==
1. João Manoel de Menezes (1783–1831), 2nd Count of Viana;
2. João Paulo Manoel de Menezes (1810–1890), 3rd Count of Viana.

== See also ==
- Count of Viana
- List of marquisates in Portugal

== Bibliography ==
"Nobreza de Portugal e Brasil" Vol III, pages 48/481. Published by Zairol, Lda., Lisbon, 1989.
