= Viscount of Faria e Maia =

Viscount of Faria e Maia (Portuguese: Visconde de Faria e Maia) was a noble title, created by decree on 16 April 1891, by King Carlos I of Portugal, in favour of Francisco Machado de Faria e Maia, an important landowner and Azorean politician.

== List of viscounts ==
1. Francisco Machado de Faria e Maia, 1st Viscount of Faria e Maia;
2. Vicente Machado de Faria e Maia, 2nd Viscount of Faria e Maia;
3. Vicente Machado de Faria e Maia, 3rd Viscount of Faria e Maia;
4. Maria Luisa Machado de Faria e Maia, 4th Viscountess of de Faria e Maia.

After the implementation of the first Portuguese Republic, and fall of the monarchy, the noble titles were extinct, resulting in the transformation of these peerages to the status of pretenders (with the most recent titleholder Vicente Machado de Faria e Maia).
