= Viscount of Banho =

Viscount of Banho (Portuguese: Visconde de Banho) is an hereditary title created by Queen Maria II of Portugal, by decree on 21 July 1835, in favour of Alexandre Tomás de Morais Sarmento, at the same time that his brother was made 1st Baron and 1st Viscount of Torre de Moncorvo, of Tomás Inácio de Morais Sarmento.

An historical family manor is located in Almendra.

== List of viscounts ==
1. Alexandre Tomás de Morais Sarmento, member of the Chamber of Lords, Minister of Portugal in Madrid, Knight of the Royal Household, Knight Great Cross of the Order of Isabel. He married D. Maria dos Prazeres Girão de Souza e Mello, Dame of the Order of Maria Luiza (of Spain), descendant of the Souza e Mello Girão, Lords of the Manor of Corujeira, on 10 May 1816 in Vouzela, Portugal;
2. Tomás Inácio Girão de Morais Sarmento, who remained un-married and without issue;
3. Júlio Girão Faria de Morais Sarmento, nephew of the first viscount, he was member of parliament, Governor of Coimbra, Minister of Justice and great defender of the dynastic principles;
4. José Júlio Castilho Girão de Morais Samento, obtained the right to use the title by Manuel II of Portugal in 1929, when in exile
