= Viscount of Torre de Moncorvo =

The Viscount of Torre de Moncorvo (Portuguese: Visconde de Torre de Moncorvo) is a title created by Queen Maria II of Portugal as a barony by decree dated 23 May 1835 in favour of Cristovão Pedro de Morais Sarmento, natural son, legitimated at the same time as his brother, the Viscount of Banho, of Tomás Inácio de Morais Sarmento.

By later decree (dated 13 July 1847) transformed this title to Viscount, Member of the House of Lords, Knight of the Royal Household, Chargé d'affaires of Portugal in London and Copenhagen, Minister of Portugal in London, Knight Great-Cross of the Order of São Tiago da Espada, of Portugal, Knight of the Order of Malta, Knight Commander of the Order of Danebrog, of Denmark.

== List of viscounts ==
1. Cristovão Pedro de Morais Sarmento, named Baron of Torre de Moncorvo. His eldest son, João Pedro de Morais Sarmento continued the title of Baron, and by marriage, was the 8th Marquess of Fronteira, the 6th Marquess of Alorna and 9th Count of Torre, leaving no descendants;
2. Alexandre Tomás de Morais Sarmento, second son of the first Baron and Viscount, president of Mangualde, Portugal, Knight Commander of the Order of Isabel, the Catholic, of Spain, etc. became the second Viscount. The title was carried by D. Maria Angelina de Morais Sarmento (second daughter of the 2nd Viscount), who later married on 14 February 1901, João Cabral Soares de Albergaria e Lemos, president of Mangualde;
3. João José Cabral Soares de Albergaria, maternal great-great-grandson, of the first viscount;
4. Luís Maria Cabral Soares de Albergaria, fourth son of the 3rd Viscount, recognized by the Institute of the Portuguese Nobility on 27 July 2011.
