= Viscount of São Jorge =

Viscount of São Jorge (Portuguese: Visconde de São Jorge) is a title was created by Carlos I of Portugal, by decree dated 7 November 1893, in the name of Adriano Auguto d´Oliveira, Knight of the Royal Household, Knight Commander of the Royal Military Order of Our Lady of Conception of Vila Viçosa. Adriano Auguto d´Oliveira married Eleanor Justine du Puy de Montbrun, daughter of the Marquess Lucien de Montbrun and the Marchioness Louise Amelie Marie Soulages de Saint-Marc. He lived in Paris and died in the same city without surviving descendants.

The title is associated with the noble house and estate of São Jorge situated in the Trás-os-Montes municipality of Azinhoso. It belonged in the 18th century (around 1740) to Tómas de Sá Pimentel Moraes Pinto d´Oliveira and his wife, D. Luiza Francisca de Moraes e Távora (from the Counts of São João da Pesqueira and later Marquesses of Távora), daughter of António Osório Pinto d´Oliveira de Moraes, Knight of the Royal Household.

== List of viscounts ==
1. Adriano Auguto d´Oliveira;
2. Laura Maria Augusta Pinto de Oliveira de Souza Girão, the title passed to Adriano Augusto's niece, who married Lieutenant António Teixeira de Castro de Souza Girão e Valle, Lord of the House of Lages and the House of Simo de Passos, Silgueiros, in the Church of St. Vincent, Bragança, on 30 July 1898;
3. Manuel Paulino de Oliveira de Sousa Girão, doctor of medicine and surgeon, from the University of Coimbra, by letters patent of Manuel II of Portugal, dated 30 January 1923;
4. Guilherme Manuel Gonçalves de Oliveira de Sousa Girão, Minister Counsellor of Embassy, retired, Knight Great-Cross of the Order of Merit, of Mauricias, Knight Great-Cross of the Order of Johore Great Officer of the Order of Rio Branco, of Brasil, Officer of the Royal Order of the Crown, of Thailand, etc.
5. Manuel Bernardo Teixeira de Castro de Souza-Girão, born in Durban, South Africa, 20 August 1970, married. Attended Harrow School, 1983–1988; MA, Trinity College, Cambridge.
