= Count of Anadia =

Noble title in the Kingdom of Portugal

Countship Anadia
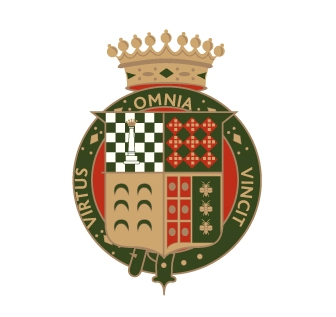
- Creation date: 17 December 1808
- Created by: Maria I of Portugal
- First holder: Dom João Rodrigues de Sá e Mello de Menezes e Sottomayor
- Last holder: Dom Manuel de Sá Pais do Amaral Pereira e Menezes de Almeida e Barberino (Monarchy abolished); Dom Miguel Maria de Sá Pais do Amaral (Claimant)
- Subsidiary titles: Count of Alferrarede; Viscount of Alverca
- Extinction date: 1910 (Monarchy abolished)
- Seat: Palace of the Counts of Anadia

Count of Anadia is a noble title created by Dom João, Prince Regent for Dona Maria I of Portugal, by decree of 17 December 1808, in favour of João Rodrigues de Sá e Melo, previously the 1st Viscount of Anadia.

== History ==
The House of the Counts of Anadia, part of the Portuguese nobility, brought together several family lines, including the Paes do Amaral of Mangualde and the Sá of Anadia. The Paes do Amaral family, established in the sixteenth century, held estates in Mangualde, where they built the Palácio Paes do Amaral. The Sá family, descended from João Rodrigues de Sá, Admiral under King João I, was granted the titles of Viscount in the eighteenth century, with some of its members serving in diplomatic and governmental roles in Portugal and Brazil.

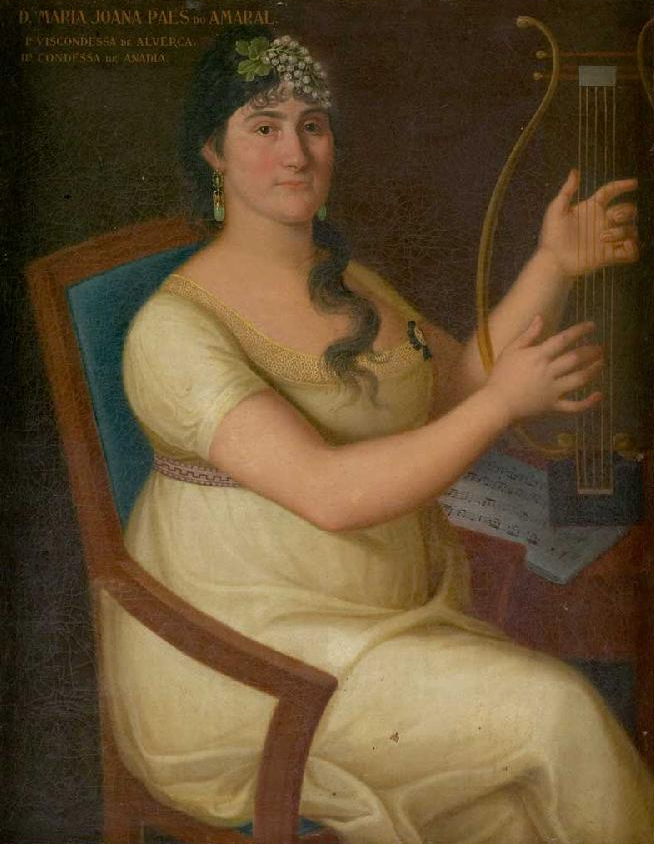
Portrait of Dona Maria Joana Paes do Amaral, 2nd Countess of Anadia and 1st Viscountess of Alverca

João Rodrigues de Sá e Melo was a nobleman of the Royal Household, Lord of the town of Anadia, Commander of São Paulo das Maçãs, Minister of Portugal in Naples and Berlin, and Secretary of State for the Navy and War. The 1st Count of Anadia, in his capacity as Secretary of the Navy, was responsible for organising the Royal Family's journey to Brazil. He also, as Secretary of State for the Navy in Brazil, founded the Navy in this Kingdom and future Empire.

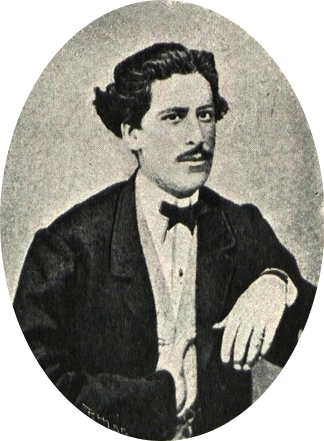
José Maria de Sá Pereira e Menezes Pais do Amaral, 4th Count of Anadia (1839–1870)

In the nineteenth century, the Houses of Anadia, Alverca, Paes do Amaral of Mangualde, Almeida of Abrantes and Quifel Barberino were brought together through the marriage of Maria Luísa de Sá Pereira e Menezes, 3rd Countess of Anadia, and her cousin Manuel Paes do Amaral de Almeida e Vasconcellos Quifel Barberino. Their son, José Maria de Sá Pereira e Menezes, 4th Count of Anadia, was the last holder of the family's morgadios (entailed estates) before their abolition in 1863. His son, Carlos de Sá Paes do Amaral, became Count and Viscount of Alferrarede and commissioned the construction of the neo-Gothic Castle of Alferrarede on the family's estate.

The present representative of these combined houses is Miguel Maria de Sá Paes do Amaral, 8th Count of Anadia and 4th Count of Alferrarede, owner of the Palace of the Counts of Anadia in Mangualde.

== Viscounts of Anadia (1786) ==
#	Name	Dates	Title	Notes
1	Dom João Rodrigues de Sá e Melo	1755–1809	1st Viscount of Anadia	Elevated to Count on 17 December 1808

== Counts of Anadia (1808) ==
#	Name	Dates	Title	Spouse	Notes
1	Dom João Rodrigues de Sá e Melo	1755–1809	1st Count of Anadia; 1st Viscount of Anadia	?	Father of the 2nd Count of Anadia
2	Dom José António de Sá Pereira e Menezes de Mello e Sottomayor	?	2nd Count of Anadia	?	Also granted the title 1st Viscount of Alverca
3	Dona Maria Luísa de Sá Pereira de Menezes de Mello Sottomayor	?	3rd Countess of Anadia; 2nd Viscountess of Alverca	Manuel Paes de Sá do Amaral d’Almeida e Vasconcelos Quifel Barberino (1781–1859)	Married to her cousin Manuel Paes do Amaral de Almeida e Vasconcellos Quifel Barberino, thereby uniting through this alliance the Houses of Anadia and Alverca with the Houses of Paes do Amaral of Mangualde, Almeida of Abrantes, and Quifel Barberino
4	Dom José Maria de Sá Pereira de Meneses Pais do Amaral de Almeida e Vasconcelos Quifel Barberino	1839–1870	4th Count of Anadia; 3rd Viscount of Alverca	Dona Ana Maria de Moraes Sarmento (daughter of the 1st Viscounts of Torre of Moncorvo)	His son Carlos de Sá Pais do Amaral Pereira e Meneses was granted the title of 1st Viscount of Alferrarede, by decree of 31 August and charter of 7 September 1882 by Luís I of Portugal, and his elevation to the rank of Grandee, as 1st Count of Alferrarede, shortly thereafter, by decree of 7 May and charter of 20 May 1903 by Carlos I of Portugal. His daughter became the 2nd Countess of Alferrarede, in her own right, but died without issue.
5	Dom Manuel de Sá Pais do Amaral Pereira e Menezes de Almeida e Barberino	1862–1903	5th Count of Anadia	Dona Maria da Graça Biester de Barros Lima, Lady-in-waiting to Queen Amélie (daughter of Councillor Joaquim Pedro de Barros Lima, Peer of the Realm, and of Dona Maria da Assunção Biester)	Father of the 6th Count of Anadia

== Claimants post-Monarchy ==
#	Name	Dates	Title	Spouse	Notes
6	Dom José Maria de Sá Pais do Amaral Pereira de Meneses	1890–1945	6th Count of Anadia	Dona Ester Salvegra Tomkinson	Son of the 5th Count of Anadia; Died without issue
7	Dom Manuel José Maria de Sá Pais do Amaral	1925–2020	7th Count of Anadia; 3rd Count of Alferrarede	Dona Maria Mafalda de Figueiredo Cabral da Câmara	Nephew of the 6th Count of Anadia; Father of the 8th Count of Anadia
8	Dom Miguel Maria de Sá Paes do Amaral	n.1954	8th Count of Anadia; 4th Count of Alferrarede	Divorced	Son of the 7th Count of Anadia
