= Viscount of Atouguia =

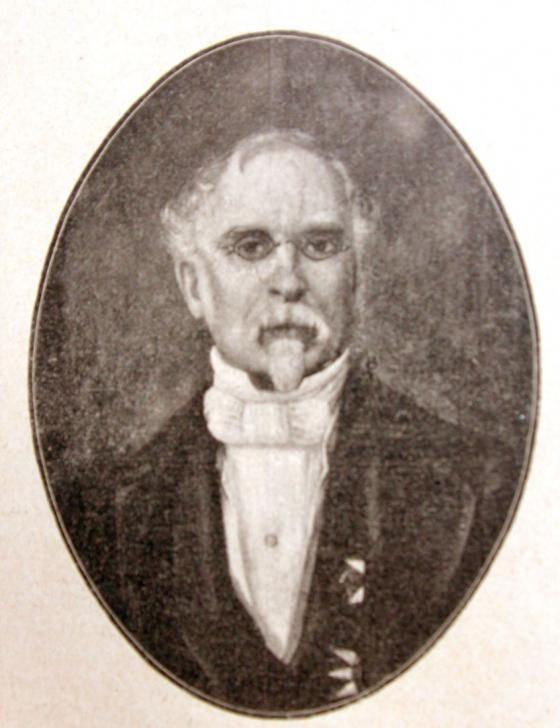
António Aloísio Jervis de Atouguia

Viscount of Atouguia (Portuguese: Visconde de Atouguia) was a title created by Queen Maria II of Portugal (on 15 March 1853), to the benefit of António Aloisio Jervis de Atouguia a politician from Madeira. Atouguia da Baleia is a parish in the municipality of Peniche, in Portugal.

After the establishment of the First Portuguese Republic in 1910, with the fall of the monarchy, titleholders became pretenders, including Rui Gomes Sequeira Manso Palma Jervis Atouguia Ferreira Pinto Basto (nephew of the predecessor) and Manuel Pepulim Jervis Atouguia.

The honour of Atouguia was re-created by the Duke of Braganza in 2013. The title of Viscount of Atouguia was conferred by the Duke of Braganza to a direct descendant of Philippa of Lancaster, whose son, Ferdinand, was the Lord of Atouguia. The current holder lives with his family in Delaware, United States but prefers to remain private.

== List of viscounts ==
- António Aloísio Jervis de Atouguia
- Atouguia Rui Ferreira Pinto Basto
- Anthony Jervis Atouguia Ferreira Pinto Basto
