= Count of Penamacor =

D. Lopo de Albuquerque was made First Count of Penamacor by King Afonso V of Portugal on August 24, 1476, by which letter the Count was also given the towns of Penamacor and Abiul.

D. Lopo de Albuquerque was Lord Chamberlain of King Afonso V, and from 1463 was also the king's Falconeer and Captain of the Royal Guard. He accompanied King Afonso V to France in 1477 where he had been sent as Ambassador earlier and was Ambassador to Rome to negotiate Afonso V's marriage to Joanna la Beltraneja, Queen Isabel's nemesis. He was accused of treason in 1484 by King John II and went into exile into Spain where he assumed the identity of Pedrio Nunes. He was arrested in London in 1488 by John II's request and released on 1492 by Queen Isabel's intervention. He was killed in Seville around 1492 by John II's agents.

He married D. Catarina de Noronha (niece of Filipa Moniz, the future wife of Christopher Columbus), daughter of D. Pedro de Noronha and of Branca Dias Perestrello, daughter of Bartolomeu Perestrello and his second wife Branca Dias.

D. Catarina de Noronha is mentioned in Diego Colón's Last Will. The Counts of Penamacor had the following children:

1. D. Garcia de Albuquerque (1470–?) married Leonor Perestrelo,
2. D. Afonso de Albuquerque,
3. Luís de Albuquerque,
4. Inês (ou Guiomar) de Noronha (c. 1470–?) married Rui de Melo, Mayor of Elvas,
5. D. Isabel de Noronha (1480–?) married Nuno Vaz de Castelo-Branco, Admiral of Portugal.
6. D. Pedro de Noronha

They also had an adopted son named Diego Mendez de Segura who became Christopher Columbus' secretary.
