= Count of Amarante =

The Count of Amarante (Portuguese: Conde de Amarante) is a noble title, decreed by Queen Maria I of Portugal on 13 May 1811, and instituted on 28 June 1811, in favour of Francisco da Silveira Pinto da Fonseca Teixeira, 1st Count of Amarante.

== List of counts ==
1. Francisco da Silveira Pinto da Fonseca Teixeira, 1st Count of Amarante (1763);
2. Manuel da Silveira Pinto da Fonseca Teixeira, 2nd Count of Amarante, 1st Marquess of Chaves (1792)

After the fall of the monarchy, the title was held by pretenders, owing to the dissolution of the noble system:

- Francisco Manuel Pereira Colmieiro da Silveira, 3rd Count of Amarante, 3rd Marquess of Chaves (1924);
- Maria Manuela Salgado da Silveira Pinto da Fonseca, 4th Countess of Amarante, 4th Marquesa of Chaves (1960)
