= António Maria Vasco de Melo Silva César e Meneses =

Portuguese noble (1851–1923)

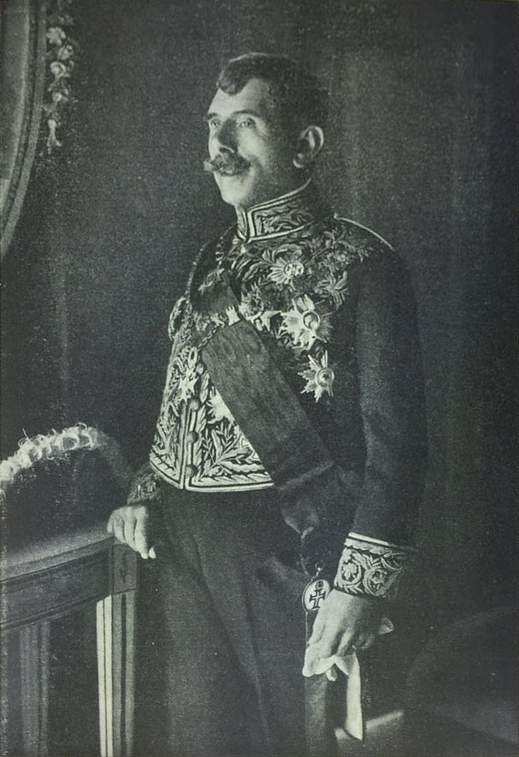
- Born: 13 November 1851; Lisbon, Portugal
- Died: 21 May 1923 (aged 71); Lisbon
- Education: University of Coimbra
- Occupation: Writer/Royal Official/Diplomat
- Writing career
- Pen name: António Vasco de Melo

António Maria Vasco de Melo Silva César e Meneses (1851 — 1923) was a Portuguese noble who was the 9th Count of Sabugosa. A law graduate, diplomat and high official, he was also a distinguished poet and writer of short stories, history, comedies and poems. He was a member of the Life's Vanquished, an informal group of Portuguese intellectuals in the last three decades of the 19th century.

== Early life ==
António Maria Vasco de Melo Silva César e Meneses was born in the Portuguese capital of Lisbon, on 13 November 1851, the son of D. António Maria José de Melo da Silva César e Meneses, the 3rd Marquis of Sabugosa and 8th Count of Sabugosa, and Maria do Carmo da Cunha Portugal and Meneses, lady-in-waiting to Queen D. Maria Pia. His father was a minister, civil governor and one of the most distinguished members of the Historic Party of Portugal.

On 8 January 1876, he married D. Mariana das Dores de Melo, the 4th Countess of Murça. His wife was a lady-in-waiting to both Queen D. Maria Pia and Queen D. Amélia. He completed his law degree at the University of Coimbra in 1877. By decree of 15 September 1879, he received the title of 9th Count of Sabugosa. In 1882 he began a diplomatic career with the Secretary of State for Foreign Affairs. He left the diplomatic service on 3 November 1910, following the establishment of the Portuguese Republic. He also served as mayor of Elvas and as a senior official of the house of Queen D. Amélia.

== Literary activity ==
Heir to a vast library, which included many rare and unpublished works, he was a writer and poet of merit. In 1894 he published a book of short stories, in collaboration with Bernardo Pinheiro Correia de Melo, 1st Count of Arnoso. In 1903 he published the book O Paço de Sintra, Apontamentos Históricos e Arqueológicas (Sintra National Palace: Historical and Archaeologiical Notes), a work that includes drawings by Queen D. Amélia, as well as watercolours by Enrique Casanova and drawings by the architect Raúl Lino.

In 1906 he published Auto da Festa, by Gil Vicente, a work that had fallen into oblivion at the time, based on a rare copy he found in the library of his palace. He also published, based on a text found in his library, the work Auto da Natural Invenção by the poet António Ribeiro Chiado. In 1908 he published the book Embrechados. He contributed assiduously to the Revista de Portugal edited by José Maria de Eça de Queirós and he also contributed to A Semana de Lisboa (1893-1895), Serões (1901-1911) O Thalassa (1913-1915) and Ideia Nacional (1915).

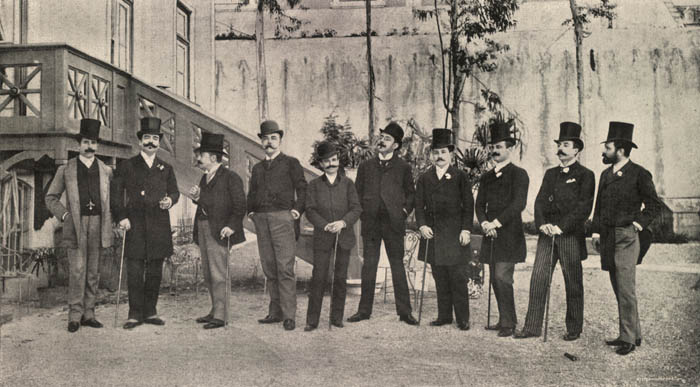
The Vencidos da Vida. Vasco de Melo is on the left

He was part of the group of intellectuals who called themselves Vencidos da Vida (Life's Vanquished), whose other members, in addition to Eça de Queirós were Guerra Junqueiro, The Count of Arnoso, The Marquis of Soveral, Ramalho Ortigão, Carlos de Lima Mayer, The Count of Ficalho, Carlos Lobo de Ávila, Oliveira Martins and António Cândido.

== Political activity ==
In the general elections of October 1879 the Count of Sabugosa was elected deputy to the Portuguese parliament for Arouca in the north of Portugal. He participated in the parliamentary committees on foreign affairs and civil legislation, being secretary of both. Upon the death of his father, on 2 December 1897, he rose to the peerage by hereditary right, taking his seat in the Chamber of Peers on 26 March 1898. In the Chamber he was a member of several committees, with emphasis on those related to business and foreign trade, trying to identify new markets for traditional Portuguese exports, such as wine and cork.

With the advent of the Portuguese Republic, he withdrew from political activity, remaining faithful to the monarchy, and frequently visiting the Portuguese royal family in England. His open defence of the monarchy earned him a few weeks of imprisonment in São Jorge Castle, Lisbon.

== Death ==
Vasco de Melo died in Lisbon on May 21, 1923.

== Awards and honours ==
He was awarded the Grand Cross of the Military Order of Christ and the Grand Cross of the Military Order of Saint James of the Sword. As a diplomat he received multiple foreign decorations. He was a member of the Royal Academy of Sciences in Lisbon, the Association of Portuguese Civil Architects and Archaeologists and the Almeida Garrett Literary Society. He was president of the Society of Bibliophiles.
