= Count of Sabugosa =

- Coronet of a Portuguese count
- Creation date: 19 September 1729
- Created by: John V of Portugal
- Peerage: Kingdom of Portugal
- First holder: Vasco Fernandes César de Meneses
- Last holder: António Maria Vasco de Melo Silva César e Meneses (monarchy abolished)
- Present holder: António Maria de Mello Silva César e Menezes (claimant)
- Extinction date: 1910 (monarchy abolished)
- Seats: Sabugosa Palace, Lisbon

Count of Sabugosa was a Portuguese title of nobility created by royal letter of King John V dated 19 September 1729 in favour of Vasco Fernandes César de Meneses, Viceroy of India and of Brazil.

Following the marriage in 1720 of the heiress of the house to the 5th Count of São Lourenço, both titles were held by the same holders from the second half of the 18th century onwards; in 1804 they were joined by the title of Marquis of Sabugosa.

== History ==
The César de Meneses family descended from Vasco Fernandes César, a cavaleiro fidalgo (knight of noble rank) of the household of King John III and chief keeper of the Casa da Índia, who in the first half of the 16th century founded the entail (morgadio) of the Césares. His son Luís César, the first administrator of the entail, built the original core of the Sabugosa Palace at Santo Amaro, in the present-day parish of Alcântara, Lisbon, which remained the family's residence over the following centuries.

Vasco Fernandes César de Meneses, son of Luís César de Meneses, alferes-mor of the Realm and governor of Rio de Janeiro, Angola and Bahia, was appointed Viceroy of India in 1712, a post he held until 1717, and Viceroy of Brazil, which he governed from 1720 to 1735. In Salvador da Bahia, the seat of his government, he founded the Academy of the Forgotten (Academia Brasílica dos Esquecidos). In 1728 he undertook works to enlarge the palace at Santo Amaro, and the following year he was created Count of Sabugosa. His biography was written by the 9th Count of Sabugosa and published posthumously at the initiative of the latter's widow.

The 2nd Count, Luís César de Meneses, eldest son of the first, was vedor (steward) of the household of Queen Maria Anna of Austria and a member of the Royal Academy of Portuguese History. In 1728 he married Ana Mascarenhas, daughter of the 2nd Counts of Óbidos, but left no issue. The house passed to his sister, Mariana Rosa de Lencastre, who in February 1720 had married Rodrigo de Melo da Silva, 5th Count of São Lourenço, a marriage that united the houses of Sabugosa and São Lourenço. Their daughter, Ana de Melo e Silva (1725–1744), 6th Countess of São Lourenço, married in 1742 João José Ansberto de Noronha, second son of the 2nd Marquises of Angeja, and the male line of the house thus became that of the Noronha family. João José Ansberto de Noronha founded the house's library at the palace of Santo Amaro. Ana died in 1744, before her mother, so it was the couple's son, António Maria de Melo da Silva César e Meneses, who succeeded to the titles of Count of São Lourenço and Count of Sabugosa; he was raised to Marquis of Sabugosa in 1804.

In the 19th century, the 3rd Marquis of Sabugosa, António Maria José de Melo da Silva César e Meneses, was a peer of the Realm and Minister of the Kingdom and of the Navy. His son, the 9th Count, to whom the title was renewed by decree of 15 September 1879, held a bachelor's degree in law from the University of Coimbra and was a diplomat, a peer of the Realm, mordomo-mor (lord steward) of the Royal Household and a member of the Royal Academy of Sciences. A writer and poet, he was a member of the Life's Vanquished group and published, among other works, O Paço de Sintra (1903), with drawings by Queen Amélie of Orléans. After 1898 he directed restoration and alteration works at the palace of Santo Amaro, including the construction of the library, where he found a printed copy of Gil Vicente's Auto da Festa, which he published in 1906. Eça de Queirós was a visitor to the palace, and it has been suggested that the house inspired the Ramalhete in The Maias; the family regards this as unconfirmed, and the same claim has been made for another Lisbon building in the Janelas Verdes area. After the establishment of the Republic he resigned from the diplomatic service and spent some time in exile. He died in Lisbon on 21 May 1923. In 2023 the centenary of his death was marked by a commemorative session at the National Library of Portugal.

According to the family, the house's various titles were distributed across different generations and were traditionally conferred on the occasion of marriage.

The Sabugosa Palace, which remains in the family's ownership and is still their residence, was classified as a monument of public interest in 2012. In 2007 the family archive, kept at the palace, received the Vasco Vilalva Prize of the Calouste Gulbenkian Foundation.

== Coat of arms ==
After the union of the houses of Sabugosa and São Lourenço, the family's arms became a shield per pale, bearing in the first the arms of Lencastre over those of Melo and in the second the arms of César, with an inescutcheon of Silva overall. The arms used by the Marquises of Sabugosa in the 20th century are quarterly, with the arms of Lencastre, César, Melo and Silva, and Guedes, the crest of the Césares and a marquis's coronet.

== Counts of Sabugosa (1729) ==
#	Holder	Dates	Titles	Notes	Ref.
1	Vasco Fernandes César de Meneses	1673–1741	1st Count of Sabugosa	Viceroy of India (1712–1717) and of Brazil (1720–1735); alferes-mor of the Realm. Married in 1692 Juliana de Lencastre (1679–1717), daughter of the 5th Counts of Santa Cruz.	
2	Luís César de Meneses	1698–1755	2nd Count of Sabugosa	Eldest son of the preceding; died without issue at the palace of Santo Amaro. Married in 1728 Ana Maria Teresa de Assis Mascarenhas (1696–1763), daughter of Fernando Martins Mascarenhas, 2nd Count of Óbidos, and of Beatriz Mascarenhas da Costa Castelo Branco Barreto, 4th Countess of Sabugal.	
3	Mariana Rosa de Lancastre	1700–1748	3rd Countess of Sabugosa (Countess of São Lourenço by marriage)	Sister of the preceding. Married in 1720 Rodrigo de Melo da Silva (1673–1725), 5th Count of São Lourenço.	
4	Ana de Melo da Silva César de Meneses	1725–1744	4th Countess of Sabugosa (6th Countess of São Lourenço)	Daughter of the preceding; died before her mother. Married in 1742 João José Ansberto de Noronha (1725–1804), son of the 2nd Marquises of Angeja, who became Count of São Lourenço by marriage.	
5	António Maria de Melo da Silva César de Meneses	1743–1805	5th Count of Sabugosa (1st Marquis of Sabugosa; 7th Count of São Lourenço)	Son of the preceding; lieutenant general. Married twice: in 1760, Joaquina José Benta Maria de Meneses (1744–1783), daughter of the 4th Marquises of Marialva; and in 1791, Ana Francisca de Sousa (1758–1798), daughter of the 5th Counts of Vila Flor and widow of João de Melo Homem.	
6	José António de Melo da Silva César de Meneses	1763–1839	6th Count of Sabugosa (2nd Marquis of Sabugosa; 8th Count of São Lourenço)	Son of the preceding; governor and captain-general of the Azores. Married in 1793 Leonor Maria José de Sampaio (1770–1816), daughter of the 1st Counts of Sampaio. In 1818 he secretly married Leonor Peregrina Vieira de Matos (1785–1843), with whom he had no issue.	
7	António José de Melo da Silva César de Meneses	1794–1863	7th Count of Sabugosa (9th Count of São Lourenço)	Son of the preceding; a supporter of King Miguel, he did not have the title of marquis renewed. Married twice: in 1811, Teresa Maria do Resgate Correia de Sá (1794–1832), daughter of the 5th Viscounts of Asseca; and in 1836, her sister, Maria Vitória do Resgate Correia de Sá (1813–1870).	
8	António Maria José de Melo da Silva César e Meneses	1825–1897	8th Count of Sabugosa (3rd Marquis of Sabugosa; 10th Count of São Lourenço)	Son of the preceding; peer of the Realm, Minister of the Kingdom (1873) and of the Navy (1879). Married in 1852 Maria do Carmo da Cunha Portugal e Meneses (1832–1910), honorary lady-in-waiting to Queen Maria Pia.	
9	António Maria Vasco de Melo Silva César e Meneses	1854–1923	9th Count of Sabugosa (11th Count of São Lourenço)	Son of the preceding; writer, member of the Life's Vanquished and mordomo-mor of the Royal Household. Married in 1876 Mariana das Dores de Melo Abreu Soares de Brito Barbosa Palha de Vasconcelos Guedes (1856–1952), 4th Countess of Murça, lady-in-waiting to Queens Maria Pia and Amélie.	

== Claimants under the Republic ==
After the establishment of the Republic in 1910, the state ceased to grant titles of nobility. Since then, the following members of the family have claimed to represent the title:

#	Name	Dates	Titles claimed	Notes	Ref.
10	António Vasco de Melo da Silva César e Meneses	1876–1928	12th Count of São Lourenço	Eldest son of the 9th Count; 11th alferes-mor of the Realm, in which capacity he served at the acclamation of King Manuel II. Died in Pau, France. Married in 1901 Berta Munro dos Anjos (1877–1971), daughter of Policarpo Pecquet Ferreira dos Anjos, peer of the Realm.	
11	António Vasco José de Mello Silva César e Menezes	1903–?	11th Count of Sabugosa (4th Marquis of Sabugosa; 13th Count of São Lourenço)	Son of the preceding; engineer by profession. Married in 1929 Maria Isabel de Jesus O'Neill (b. 1910), daughter of Hugo O'Neill, a naval officer.	
12	António Vasco de Mello Silva César e Menezes	b. 1931	14th Count of São Lourenço	Eldest son of the preceding; engineer and founding president of the Confederation of Portuguese Industry. Married in 1958 Maria do Carmo Trigoso de Siqueira da Cunha (b. 1937).	
13	António Maria de Mello Silva César e Menezes	b. 1959	13th Count of Sabugosa	Eldest son of the preceding; president of the Associação Portuguesa das Casas Antigas (Portuguese Historic Houses Association). In October 2026 he was the subject of an episode of the television segment Sangue Azul on SIC.	

== Gallery ==
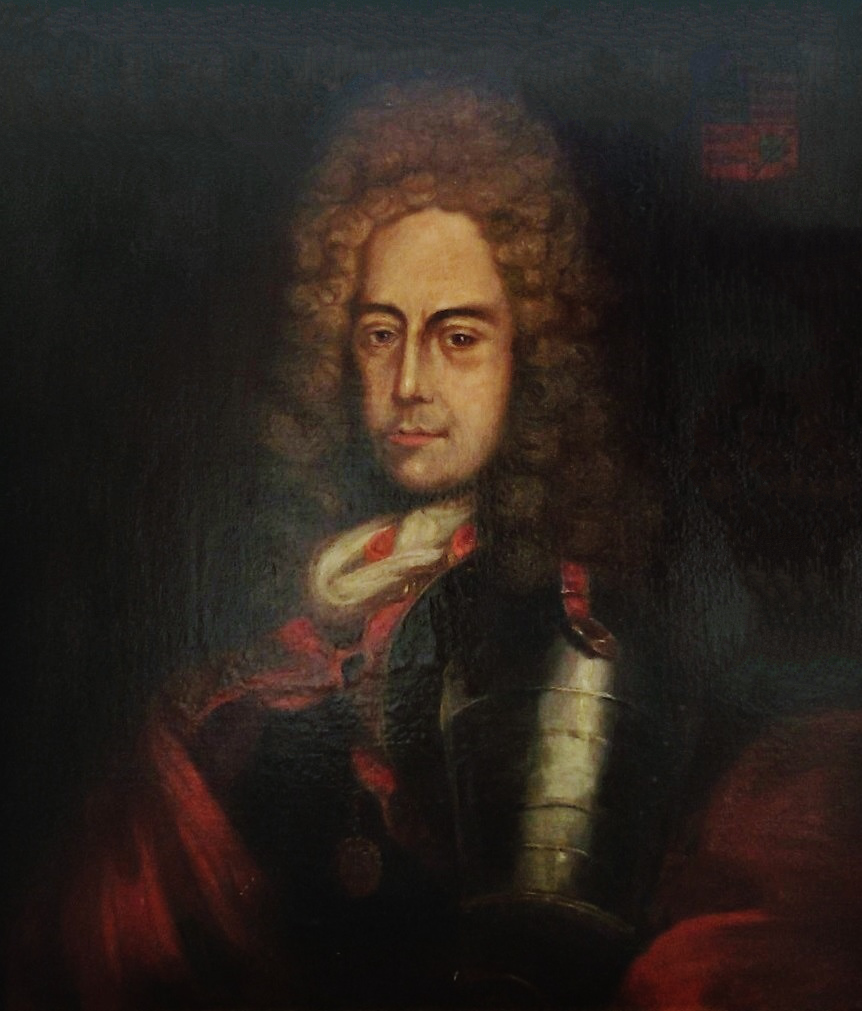
Portrait of Vasco Fernandes César de Meneses, 1st Count of Sabugosa (1673–1741), circle of Pompeo Batoni, 18th century

António Maria Vasco de Melo Silva César e Meneses, 9th Count of Sabugosa (1854–1923), in 1903

King Manuel II with Infante Afonso, the Count of Arnoso and the Marquis of Sabugosa

Family tomb of the Marquises of Sabugosa and Counts of São Lourenço, in 2017

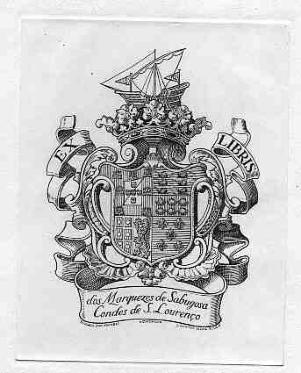
Coat of arms of the Counts of Sabugosa

== See also ==
- Count of São Lourenço
- List of countships in Portugal
- List of marquisates in Portugal
- Marquis of Sabugosa
- Sabugosa Palace
