= Count of São Lourenço =

- Coronet of a Portuguese count
- Creation date: 26 June 1640
- Created by: Philip III of Portugal
- Peerage: Kingdom of Portugal
- First holder: Pedro da Silva
- Last holder: António Maria Vasco de Melo Silva César e Meneses (monarchy abolished)
- Present holder: António Vasco de Mello Silva César e Menezes (claimant)
- Extinction date: 1910 (monarchy abolished)
- Seats: Sabugosa Palace, Lisbon

Count of São Lourenço was a Portuguese title of nobility created by King Philip III by royal letter of 26 June 1640 in favour of Pedro da Silva, governor and captain-general of the State of Brazil.

The title should not be confused with those of Baron and Viscount of São Lourenço, created in 1811 and 1819 for Francisco Bento Maria Targini, or with that of Baron of São Lourenço, created in 1848 for António Joaquim da Costa Carvalho, which belonged to other families.

== History ==
Pedro da Silva, known as o Duro ("the Hard"), was the son of Lourenço da Silva, lord of Vagos and regedor das Justiças (chief justice), who was killed at the Battle of Alcácer Quibir. He served in the fleets, in Africa and in India, was governor of São Jorge da Mina and, from 1635 to 1638, governor and captain-general of Brazil, where he organised the defence of Salvador da Bahia against the Dutch occupation. The title was granted to him by Philip III in recognition of his services in the defence of that city. He married his cousin Luísa da Silva, lady of the entail of Monchique and daughter and heiress of Fernão da Silva, alcaide-mor (governor) of Silves, with whom he had three daughters, one of whom succeeded him. He spent his final years in retirement at his house in Odivelas. After the Restoration he was appointed regedor (president) of the Casa da Suplicação, the kingdom's high court, by royal letter of 8 January 1641, an office he still held on 28 March 1643; he died on 25 October 1656.

The 2nd Countess, Madalena da Silva, married her cousin Martim Afonso de Melo, 5th alcaide-mor of Elvas, who had served in India as governor of Muscat and of Cape Comorin. Martim Afonso de Melo played a part in the revolution of 1640, was appointed to the Council of War and served three times as military governor of the Alentejo during the Portuguese Restoration War. From 1642 to 1646 he governed the Algarve, where in 1644 he proposed to the king the construction of forts near the beaches of Luz and Porto de Mós, in Lagos. He was also lord of Vila do Bispo, granted to him by charter of 26 August 1662 on condition that it be raised to the status of a town, the origin of the present-day municipality of Vila do Bispo. In 1655 he was accused of involvement in the attack in which the 6th Count of Vimioso was killed, and was imprisoned in Lisbon Castle until 1656, when he was released after his innocence was established. During his last term as governor, in 1657, he was unable to prevent the surrender of Olivença to the Spanish and was dismissed. In 1660 he was appointed vedor da Fazenda (overseer of the Treasury). He received the title of count by royal letter of King John IV dated 22 October 1647, on the renunciation of his father-in-law, and died in Lisbon on 31 July 1671. Through this marriage the male line of the house passed from the Silva family to the Melo family, which brought with it the governorship of Elvas, held by the family since 1499; from 1664 the Counts of São Lourenço were also alferes-mor of the Realm. Martim Afonso de Melo and Madalena da Silva were the first administrators of an entail founded by another Pedro da Silva, Viceroy of India, which later passed to their son and grandson, both Counts of São Lourenço.

The 3rd Count, Luís de Melo da Silva, was vedor (steward) of the household of Queens Maria Francisca of Savoy and Maria Sophia of Neuburg. Implicated, like his father, in the death of the Count of Vimioso, he lived in exile in France and Italy until the death of King John IV. He married Filipa de Faro, daughter of Bernardino de Távora e Sousa, reposteiro-mor (chief chamberlain). His son, Martim António Afonso de Melo, 4th Count, was mestre-de-campo at Campo Maior and, during the War of the Spanish Succession, lieutenant general of the Alentejo cavalry and sargento-mor de batalha in that province; he was also governor and captain-general of the Algarve. He died in Lisbon in 1718 without issue.

He was succeeded by his brother, Rodrigo de Melo da Silva, who had pursued an ecclesiastical career and was released from holy orders in order to succeed to the house. He was 6th alcaide-mor of Elvas and lord of the entail of Monchique. In February 1720 he married Mariana Rosa de Lencastre, daughter and heiress of the 1st Counts of Sabugosa, a marriage that united the houses of São Lourenço and Sabugosa.

The couple's daughter, Ana de Melo e Silva, 6th Countess, heiress of the houses of São Lourenço and Sabugosa, married in 1742 João José Ansberto de Noronha, second son of the 2nd Marquises of Angeja, who by marriage became 6th Count of São Lourenço, 8th alcaide-mor of Elvas and 6th alferes-mor of the Realm; the male line of the house thus passed to the Noronha family, which it retains. João José Ansberto de Noronha founded the house's library at the palace of Santo Amaro. Accused of involvement in the Távora affair, he was imprisoned in the fort of Junqueira for seventeen years, until after the death of King Joseph I. At the time of the 1755 Lisbon earthquake, the Counts of São Lourenço usually lived at their palace on Rua da Cruz de Pau, now Rua do Marechal Saldanha, in Lisbon.

Ana died in 1744, before her mother, and her son, António Maria de Melo da Silva César e Meneses, succeeded to the title of Count of São Lourenço and later to that of Count of Sabugosa; he was raised to Marquis of Sabugosa in 1804. From then on, the title of Count of São Lourenço was used by the Marquises of Sabugosa and their heirs. António José de Melo da Silva César de Meneses, 9th Count of São Lourenço and a supporter of King Miguel, was military governor of Porto, Minister of War from 1829 to 1834 and, in 1833, commander-in-chief of the army that besieged the liberals in Porto during the Siege of Porto; for this reason the title of marquis was never renewed for him.

The Sabugosa Palace, which remains in the family's ownership and is still their residence, was classified as a monument of public interest in 2012. In 2007 the family archive, kept at the palace, received the Vasco Vilalva Prize of the Calouste Gulbenkian Foundation.

== Coat of arms ==
Until the union with the house of Sabugosa, the arms of the Counts of São Lourenço were a shield per pale, with the arms of Melo and of Silva. After the union, they became a shield per pale, bearing in the first the arms of Lencastre over those of Melo and in the second the arms of César, with an inescutcheon of Silva overall, and a count's coronet. By the late 19th century, the Counts of São Lourenço used the same arms as the Marquises of Sabugosa.

== Counts of São Lourenço (1640) ==
#	Holder	Dates	Titles	Notes	Ref.
1	Pedro da Silva	1570–1656	1st Count of São Lourenço	Known as o Duro; governor and captain-general of Brazil (1635–1638) and regedor of the Casa da Suplicação (1641–1643). Married his cousin Luísa da Silva, lady of the entail of Monchique, daughter and heiress of Fernão da Silva, alcaide-mor of Silves. Died on 25 October 1656.	
2	Madalena da Silva	1600–?	2nd Countess of São Lourenço	Daughter and heiress of the preceding. Her husband received the title by royal letter of 22 October 1647, on his father-in-law's renunciation. Married her cousin Martim Afonso de Melo (d. 1671), 5th alcaide-mor of Elvas and Count of São Lourenço by marriage, widower of Francisca da Guerra.	
3	Luís de Melo da Silva	1620–?	3rd Count of São Lourenço	Son of the preceding; vedor of the household of Queens Maria Francisca of Savoy and Maria Sophia of Neuburg. Married Filipa de Faro (d. 1702), daughter of Bernardino de Távora e Sousa, reposteiro-mor, who as a widow was lady of the bedchamber to Queen Catherine of Braganza.	
4	Martim António Afonso de Melo	1670–1718	4th Count of São Lourenço	Son of the preceding; lieutenant general of the Alentejo cavalry and governor and captain-general of the Algarve. Married in 1695 Madalena Rosalina de Lima (1672–1739), daughter of the 11th Viscounts of Vila Nova de Cerveira; he had no issue.	
5	Rodrigo de Melo da Silva	1673–1725	5th Count of São Lourenço	Brother of the preceding; had pursued an ecclesiastical career before succeeding to the house. Married in 1720 Mariana Rosa de Lencastre (1700–1748), 3rd Countess of Sabugosa.	
6	Ana de Melo da Silva César de Meneses	1725–1744	6th Countess of São Lourenço (4th Countess of Sabugosa)	Daughter of the preceding; died before her mother. Married in 1742 João José Ansberto de Noronha (1725–1804), son of the 2nd Marquises of Angeja, Count of São Lourenço by marriage.	
7	António Maria de Melo da Silva César de Meneses	1743–1805	7th Count of São Lourenço (1st Marquis of Sabugosa; 5th Count of Sabugosa)	Son of the preceding. Married twice: in 1760, Joaquina José Benta Maria de Meneses (1744–1783), daughter of the 4th Marquises of Marialva; and in 1791, Ana Francisca de Sousa (1758–1798), daughter of the 5th Counts of Vila Flor and widow of João de Melo Homem.	
8	José António de Melo da Silva César de Meneses	1763–1839	8th Count of São Lourenço (2nd Marquis of Sabugosa; 6th Count of Sabugosa)	Son of the preceding. Married in 1793 Leonor Maria José de Sampaio (1770–1816), daughter of the 1st Counts of Sampaio. In 1818 he secretly married Leonor Peregrina Vieira de Matos (1785–1843), with whom he had no issue.	
9	António José de Melo da Silva César de Meneses	1794–1863/1867	9th Count of São Lourenço (7th Count of Sabugosa)	Son of the preceding; already used the title in 1838, during his father's lifetime. Minister of War under King Miguel (1829–1834). Married twice: in 1811, Teresa Maria do Resgate Correia de Sá (1794–1832), daughter of the 5th Viscounts of Asseca; and in 1836, her sister, Maria Vitória do Resgate Correia de Sá (1813–1870).	
10	António Maria José de Melo da Silva César e Meneses	1825–1897	10th Count of São Lourenço (3rd Marquis of Sabugosa; 8th Count of Sabugosa)	Son of the preceding. Married in 1852 Maria do Carmo da Cunha Portugal e Meneses (1832–1910), honorary lady-in-waiting to Queen Maria Pia.	
11	António Maria Vasco de Melo Silva César e Meneses	1854–1923	11th Count of São Lourenço (9th Count of Sabugosa)	Son of the preceding; writer. Married in 1876 Mariana das Dores de Melo Abreu Soares de Brito Barbosa Palha de Vasconcelos Guedes (1856–1952), 4th Countess of Murça, lady-in-waiting to Queens Maria Pia and Amélie.	

== Claimants under the Republic ==
After the establishment of the Republic in 1910, the state ceased to grant titles of nobility. Since then, the following members of the family have claimed to represent the title:

#	Name	Dates	Titles claimed	Notes	Ref.
12	António Vasco de Melo da Silva César e Meneses	1876–1928	12th Count of São Lourenço	Eldest son of the preceding; 11th alferes-mor of the Realm, in which capacity he served at the acclamation of King Manuel II. Died in Pau, France. Married in 1901 Berta Munro dos Anjos (1877–1971), daughter of Policarpo Pecquet Ferreira dos Anjos, peer of the Realm.	
13	António Vasco José de Mello Silva César e Menezes	1903–?	13th Count of São Lourenço (4th Marquis of Sabugosa; 11th Count of Sabugosa)	Son of the preceding; engineer. Married in 1929 Maria Isabel de Jesus O'Neill (b. 1910), daughter of Hugo O'Neill, a naval officer.	
14	António Vasco de Mello Silva César e Menezes	b. 1931	14th Count of São Lourenço	Eldest son of the preceding; engineer and founding president of the Confederation of Portuguese Industry. Married in 1958 Maria do Carmo Trigoso de Siqueira da Cunha (b. 1937).	

== Gallery ==
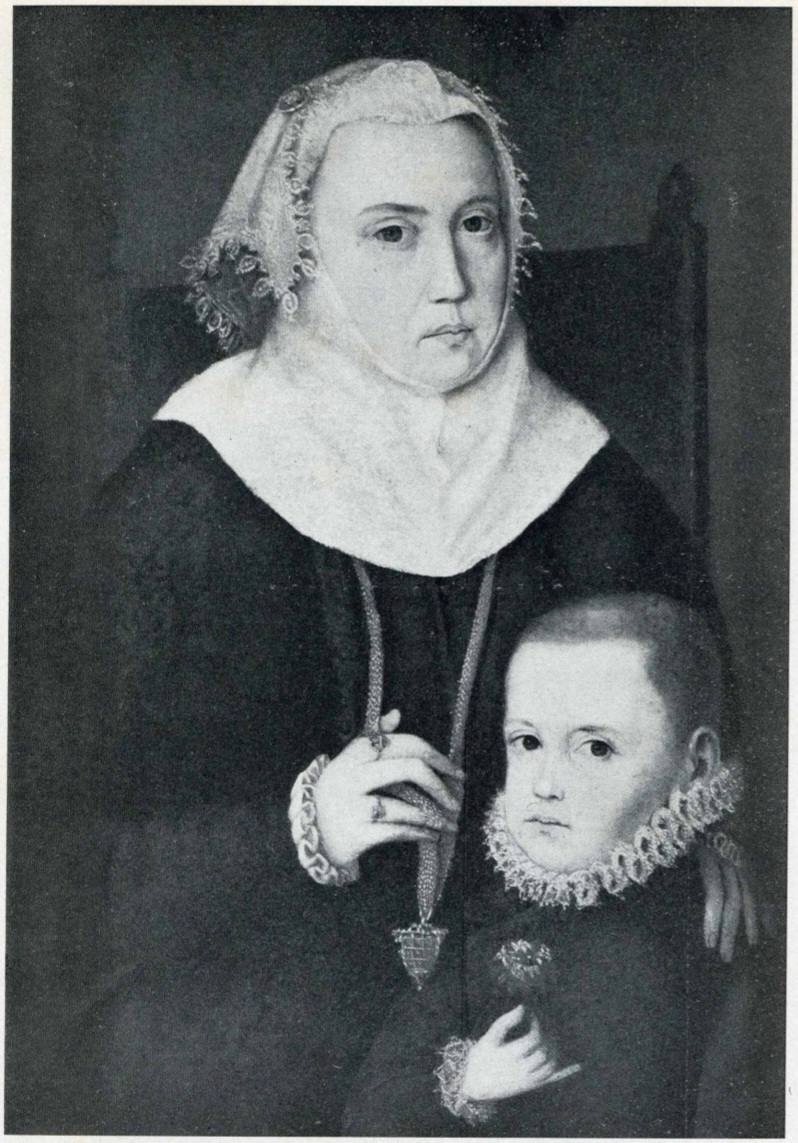
Margarida da Silva with her son Martim Afonso de Melo, later Count of São Lourenço by marriage and one of the conspirators of 1640

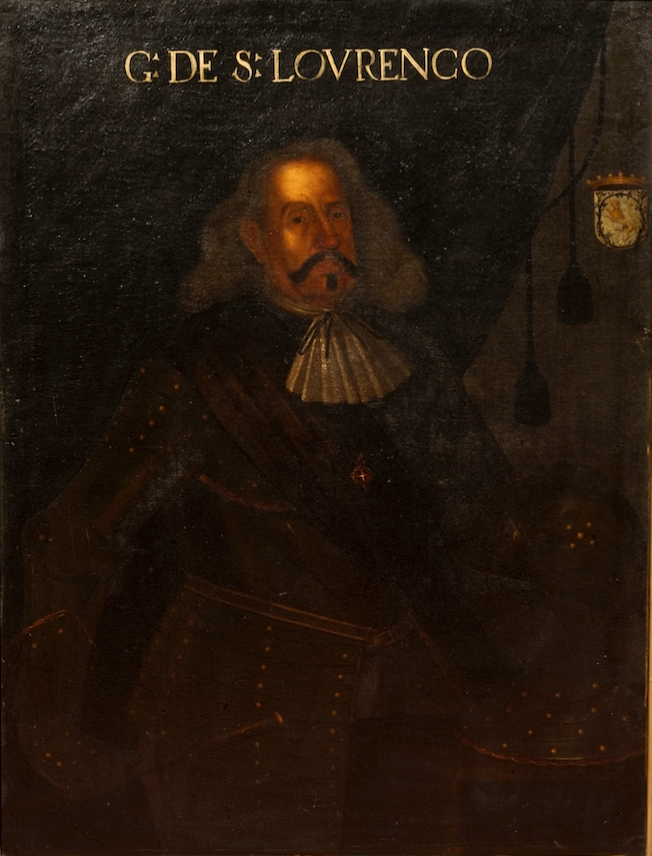
Martim Afonso de Melo, 2nd Count of São Lourenço (1595?–1671)

António Maria de Melo da Silva César de Meneses, 7th Count of São Lourenço and 1st Marquis of Sabugosa (1743–1805)

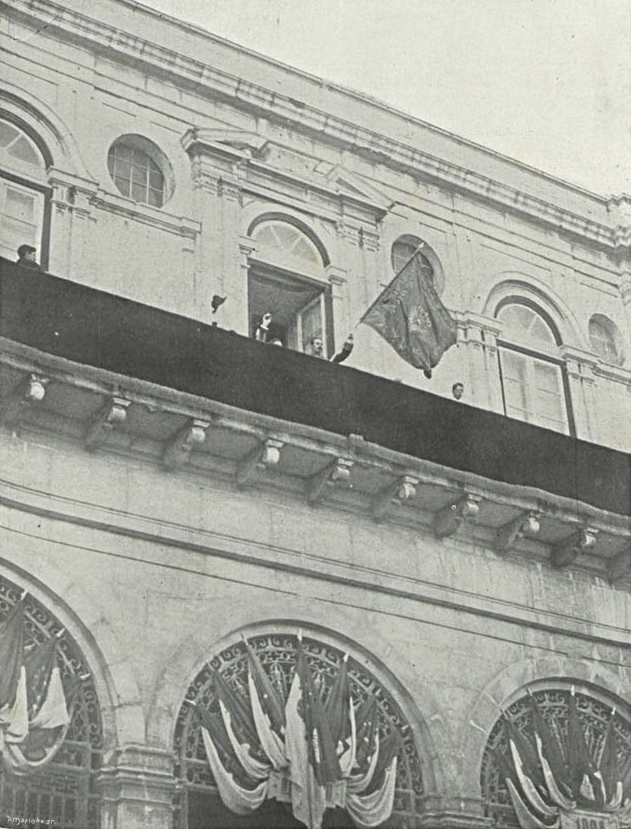
The 12th Count of São Lourenço, as alferes-mor of the Realm, holding the royal standard and announcing to the people the acclamation of King Manuel II, in 1908

Family tomb of the Marquises of Sabugosa and Counts of São Lourenço, in 2017

== See also ==
- Count of Sabugosa
- Marquis of Sabugosa
- List of countships in Portugal
- List of marquisates in Portugal
- Sabugosa Palace
