= Sabugosa Palace =

Palace in Lisbon, Portugal

- Palácio Sabugosa
- The palace in 2024

General information
- Type: Residence
- Location: Lisbon, Portugal
- Coordinates: 38°42′11.4″N 9°10′49.5″W
- Current tenants: Private residence
- Construction started: 16th century
- Renovated: 1728; late 19th century
- Client: Luís César de Meneses
- Monument of Public Interest (2012)

Sabugosa Palace (in portuguese: Palácio Sabugosa), also known as the Palace of the Counts of São Lourenço (Palácio dos Condes de São Lourenço), the Palácio dos Césares or the Palácio de Santo Amaro, is located at Rua 1.º de Maio, Nos. 112–124, in the parish of Alcântara, Lisbon, Portugal. Its original core dates from the 16th century; it was enlarged in 1728 and restored in the late 19th century.

Classified, together with its gardens, as a Monument of Public Interest since 2012, the palace remains the residence of descendants of the Counts of Sabugosa and of São Lourenço.

== History ==
=== Origins ===
In the 16th century a rural manor house was built on the site as the residence of Luís César de Meneses, an ancestor of the Counts of São Lourenço and of the Counts and Marquesses of Sabugosa. Luís César was the first administrator of the Césares entail (morgadio), established by his father, Vasco Fernandes César, a knight of the household of King John III and chief keeper (guarda-mor) of the Casa da Índia. A deed of 1588 already refers to his houses at Santo Amaro, which at the time resembled a country house more than a palace.

The property, known as the Quinta Cesária and later as the Mata dos Sabugosas, covered about three hectares between Alcântara and the Tapada da Ajuda, extending as far as the Vale Flor Palace and the hermitage of Santo Amaro. A formal garden with a central pond, terrace and cascade survives next to the house.

=== 18th century ===
The works of 1728, to which the building still owes its essential layout, were undertaken by Vasco Fernandes César de Meneses, Viceroy of India and of Brazil, who was created 1st Count of Sabugosa by letters patent of 19 September 1729. As the 2nd Count had no issue, the house passed to his sister, who had married the 5th Count of São Lourenço in 1720; this is the origin of the palace's alternative name.

The building survived the 1755 Lisbon earthquake without significant damage and, after the disaster, housed the women of the Recolhimento de Nossa Senhora do Carmo, a religious retreat house. According to the family, it was at this time that they left their palace near the Ribeira Palace, which had been destroyed by the earthquake, and settled in Alcântara.

=== 19th and 20th centuries ===
In the late 19th century, much of the estate was divided into plots for urban development. Around the same time, the 9th Count of Sabugosa, António Maria Vasco de Melo Silva César e Meneses, oversaw the remodelling of the interiors, including the construction of the library in a former courtyard, decorated by the woodcarver Leandro Braga.

A writer, Lord High Steward (mordomo-mor) of the Royal Household and member of the Life's Vanquished, the 9th Count hosted a number of literary figures at the palace. In its library he found a previously unknown pamphlet of Gil Vicente's Auto da Festa, which was published in facsimile in 1906. Part of the family archive had been sold to the state in 1875 and was transferred to the Torre do Tombo National Archive.

The alignment of the pillars of the 25 de Abril Bridge was reportedly altered in the 1960s to spare the palace, with the agreement of António de Oliveira Salazar; the family, however, disputes that this was due solely to the identity of the owners. The palace now stands directly beneath the bridge.

=== Classification ===
The classification process was opened by the IPPAR in 1998 and received a favourable opinion from the IGESPAR in 2009. Ordinance No. 262/2012, published in the Diário da República on 29 June 2012, classified the Sabugosa Palace and Gardens as a Monument of Public Interest and established its special protection zone, on the grounds of its historical, aesthetic, technical and architectural value.

== Architecture ==
=== Exterior ===
The main façade, dating from the 18th century and facing Rua 1.º de Maio, has six balconied windows on the piano nobile, topped by a cornice. The west façade, overlooking the garden, is the most decorative and retains a pilaster marking the 18th-century extension.

=== Interior ===
The interior features an entrance hall lined with 17th-century azulejos depicting mythological scenes, a staircase with polychrome tiles from the late 18th century, and a chapel housing a figure of Christ attributed to Machado de Castro. The entrance gallery, dating from 1728, displays ceramic medallions bearing effigies of Portuguese monarchs.

The domed dining room is decorated with oil painting on stucco depicting the fauna and flora of Brazil, similar to that of the Ramalhão Palace in Sintra; sources date it variously from 1728 to the late 18th century. The rooms contain family portraits and works by Josefa de Óbidos, Pellegrini and Carlos Reis.

== Library and archive ==
In the mid-20th century the library, described as one of the richest private libraries in Lisbon, held more than twelve thousand works. Closed for much of the 20th century, the library and archive received the first Vasco Vilalva Prize from the Calouste Gulbenkian Foundation in 2007 and have since been undergoing cataloguing and digitisation in collaboration with researchers from NOVA University Lisbon.

== Present use ==
In 2022, around 25 members of the family of the Count of São Lourenço, António Vasco de Mello, lived in the palace in separate residential units. The palace is part of the network of historic houses of the European platform MERITA.

== In literature and the media ==
According to tradition, the palace, which Eça de Queirós frequented, is said to have inspired the description of the Ramalhete in The Maias.

In October 2026, António Maria de Mello Silva César e Menezes, a descendant of the Counts of Sabugosa and a resident of the palace, was the subject of a segment of the Sangue Azul (Blue Blood) series on SIC Notícias.
