= Veva de Lima =

Portuguese socialite

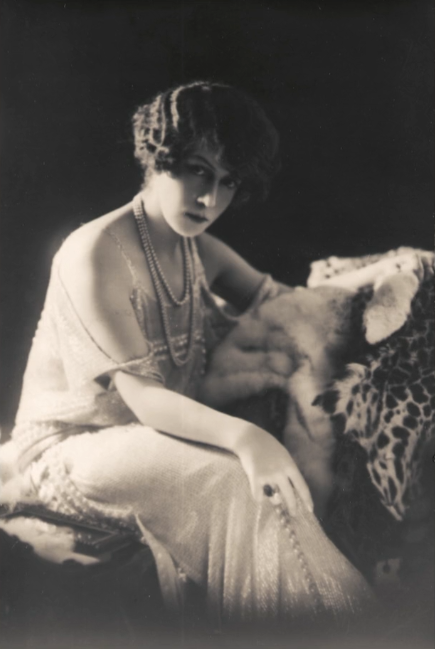
- Born: Genoveva de Lima Mayer; 3 September 1886; Lisbon, Kingdom of Portugal
- Died: 8 July 1963 (aged 76); Lisbon, Portugal
- Citizenship: Portuguese
- Occupations: writer, socialite
- Known for: Eccentric host of literary salons in Lisbon
- Spouse: Rui Enes Ulrich
- Children: 2 (including Maria Ulrich)
- Parent(s): Carlos de Lima Mayer; Amélia da Veiga Araújo

Genoveva de Lima Mayer Ulrich (1886 – 1963), who used the pen name Veva de Lima (Portuguese pronunciation: [ˈvɛvɐ ðɨ ˈlimɐ]) was a Portuguese writer, socialite and eccentric, who was known for hosting literary salons in the Portuguese capital of Lisbon.

== Early life ==
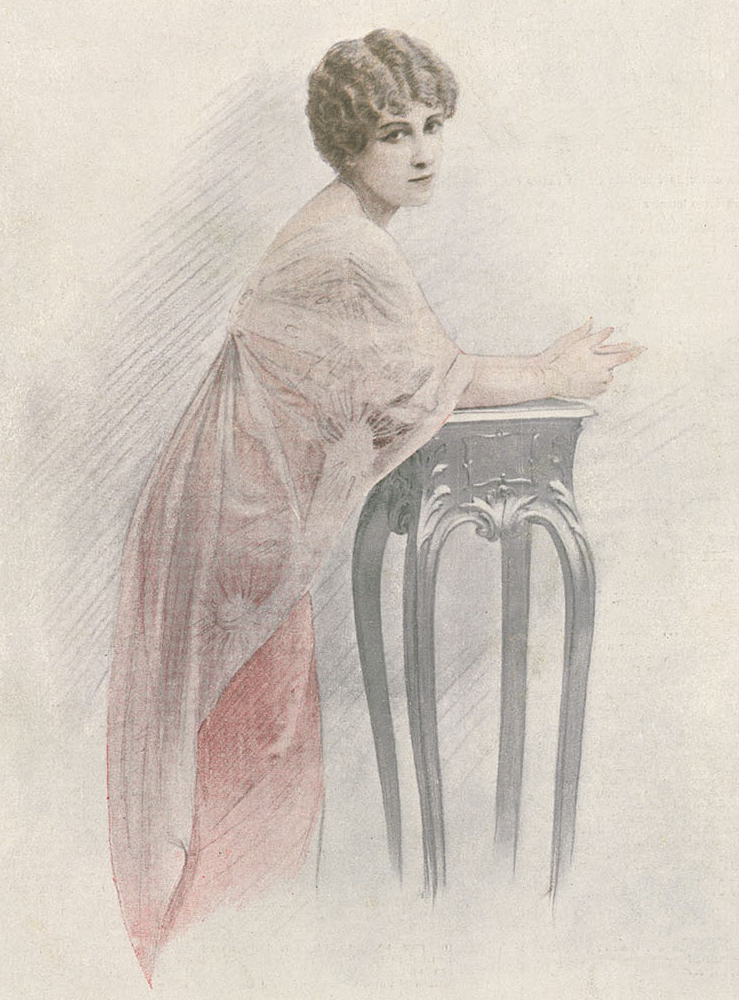
A portrait of Lima in 1916 by an unknown author

Lima was born in Lapa in Lisbon on 3 September 1886. She was the daughter of Amélia da Veiga Araújo and Carlos de Lima Mayer, a member of Life's Vanquished (Vencidos da Vida), an informal group of intellectuals in Lisbon in the last three decades of the 19th century. She had one brother. Lima married Rui Enes Ulrich, an academic at the University of Coimbra, director of the Bank of Portugal and businessman who would become Portugal's ambassador to London on two occasions. They had one daughter, the educationalist Maria Ulrich, and a son who committed suicide. Rui Ulrich was a monarchist and, after the overthrow of the Portuguese monarchy in 1910, he decided to leave Portugal, taking his family to live in Biarritz in France. In 1923 – 24, the couple visited Mozambique, which she wrote about in her book D'Aquem & D'Alem-Mar.

== A socialite ==
While they were away, the couple's home on Rua Silva de Carvalho in the Amoreiras area of Lisbon, which was formally known as the Ulrich Palace, was rented out. On their return it became better known as the Casa Veva de Lima (Veva de Lima House), as it was where she hosted her salons, receiving Lisbon's intellectual and social elite. Her evenings were noted for her excessive displays, some of which would now be considered totally unacceptable, such as her practice of smearing the servants' faces in black, dressing them in leopard loincloths, and forming a guard of honour holding torches for the arriving guests. On another occasion, she borrowed camels from a visiting circus.

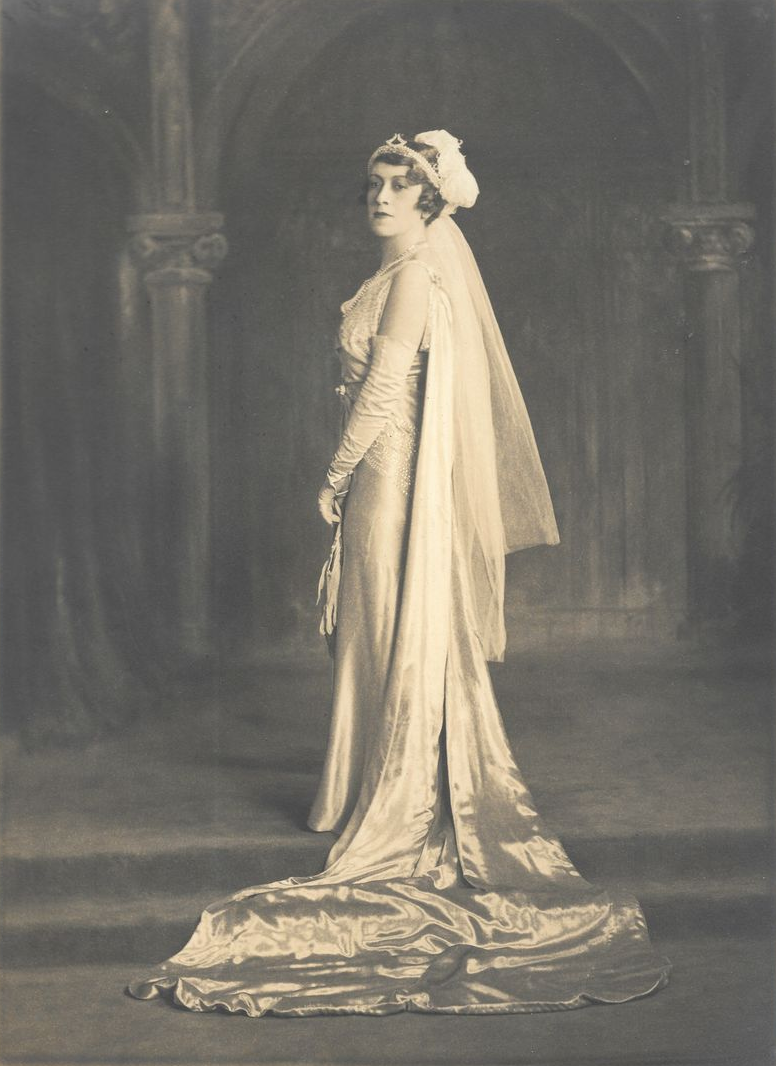
Veva de Lima photographed in court dress in London, 1933

Lima was very eccentric. She kept a leopard that was allowed to roam freely around the house and garden and which she is said to have walked on a leash through the centre of Lisbon. At the same time, she was politically involved. She opposed fascism, announced on the radio that she was an anglophile at a time when Portugal was trying hard to be neutral, and took advantage of the position of her husband to tease the dictator of Portugal, António de Oliveira Salazar, sending him an open invitation to visit the Ulrich house, which Salazar declined. She organized events to raise funds for the underprivileged and supported the arts.

During her time in London, she came to the notice of Princess Elizabeth, later Queen Elizabeth II. The Queen is said to have asked Salazar to extend Ulrich's second term as ambassador, so that the couple could represent Portugal at her coronation in June 1953.

== Publications ==
- O único Vencido da Vida que também o foi da morte. Livraria Luso-Espanhola
- D'Aquem & D'Alem-Mar - Chronicas de Viagem. 1928. Imprensa Libanio da Silva, Lisbon.
- O último lampadário. Self published. c. 1917
- Fantaisie de Printemps. Pièce en Deux Actes. 1916. Imprensa Libanio da Silva.

== In popular literature ==
- Veva is a historical novel by Joana Leitão de Barros.

== Death ==
Lima was said to have "aged prematurely" and she gradually withdrew from society. She died in Lisbon on 8 July 1963.
