= Duke of Terceira =

- Creation date: 8 November 1832
- Created by: Maria II of Portugal
- Peerage: Kingdom of Portugal
- First holder: António José de Sousa Manuel de Meneses
- Last holder: António José de Sousa Manuel de Meneses
- Present holder: Lourenço da Bandeira Manoel de Vilhena de Freitas (claimant)
- Subsidiary titles: Count of Vila Flor; Marquis of Vila Flor
- Status: Honours of a Relative of the Crown
- Extinction date: 1860 (death of the only holder without issue)
- Former seats: Palace of São João da Praça, Lisbon

Duke of Terceira (in portuguese: Duque da Terceira) was a Portuguese title of nobility created with the honours of a Relative of the Crown by the Regent Pedro, in the name of Queen Maria II, by royal letter of 8 November 1832, in favour of António José de Sousa Manuel de Meneses, 7th Count and Marquis of Vila Flor. The family enjoyed the honours of a Relative of the Crown.

The 1st Duke was also 7th Count of Vila Flor and the only Marquis of Vila Flor. He died without issue in 1860.

== History ==
The title was created by the Regent Pedro, in the name of Maria II, by royal letter of 8 November 1832, during the Siege of Porto, two days after Pedro had personally taken command of the liberal army, which until then had been led by the recipient. The name refers to Terceira Island, of which the then Count of Vila Flor had taken over the government in 1829. There, on 11 August of that year, at the town of Praia, he repelled the absolutist expedition sent from Lisbon in the liberals' first victory, and he later joined the Regency established on the island in the name of Maria II, together with the Marquis of Palmela and José António Guerreiro.

António José de Sousa Manuel de Meneses Severim de Noronha (1792–1860), eldest son of the 6th Counts of Vila Flor, had succeeded his father in 1795, at the age of two, in the title of Count of Vila Flor and the office of copeiro-mor (chief cupbearer). A soldier from 1803, he distinguished himself in the Peninsular War, particularly at the Battle of Vitoria, and was governor and captain-general of Pará. Appointed a peer of the Realm in 1826, he won victories over the absolutists in 1827 at Coruche da Beira, Ponte do Prado and Ponte da Barca, for which he received the title of Marquis of Vila Flor, although the royal letter was not issued until 14 January 1833.

As duke, in 1833 he led the expedition that landed in the Algarve and, after defeating Teles Jordão's division at Cacilhas, entered Lisbon on 24 July of that year. Raised to marshal of the Army, he then commanded the northern expeditionary division and won the Battle of Asseiceira on 16 May 1834; the operations he conducted with Saldanha led to the Convention of Évora Monte, which ended the civil war.

A Councillor of State from 1833, he was Minister of War in Maria II's first constitutional government and served as President of the Council of Ministers in 1836, from 1842 to 1846, in 1851 and from 1859, holding at various times the portfolios of War, Foreign Affairs, Justice and the Navy. A supporter of the Constitutional Charter, in 1837 he took part with Saldanha in the Revolt of the Marshals. He died in office in Lisbon on 26 April 1860 and was buried with the highest honours in the Pantheon of São Vicente de Fora, reserved for the kings of Portugal.

He was Master of the Horse and acting Lord Steward to Maria II, acting Constable of the Realm, governor of Belém Tower and president of the Supreme Council of Military Justice; the 1838 Resenha dates his appointment as Master of the Horse to 1834 and as Constable to 1835. In reward for his services he received an endowment of 100 contos de réis. In 1877, a monument to him was unveiled at Cais do Sodré in Lisbon, and the square was renamed Praça do Duque da Terceira.

He married twice, both times to cousins: in 1811 Maria José do Livramento de Melo, daughter of the 1st Marquises of Sabugosa, who died in Pará in 1818 and with whom he had a son who died aged one; and in 1821, in Rio de Janeiro, Maria Ana Luísa Filomena de Mendonça, daughter of the 1st Marquises of Loulé and Mistress of the Robes to Maria II, who was buried beside her husband. He died without issue, and the title had no successor.

The palace of São João da Praça in Lisbon, where he lived, was sold in the 19th century to the merchant José Camilo de Mendonça.

== Coat of arms ==
Quarterly: first and fourth, the arms of Sousa do Prado; second and third, the arms of Manuel; overall, an inescutcheon of Meneses. A duke's coronet and the crest of Sousa. The arms of Sousa do Prado were themselves quarterly of the royal arms debruised by a bendlet sable, and a lion; those of Manuel showed a wing Or with a hand grasping a sword; and those of Meneses, a ring. The crest was the Sousa lion.

== Dukes of Terceira (1832) ==
#	Holder	Dates	Titles	Notes	Ref.
1	António José de Sousa Manuel de Meneses	1792–1860	1st Duke of Terceira (7th Count and Marquis of Vila Flor)	Title created with the honours of a Relative of the Crown by royal letter of 8 November 1832 from the Regent Pedro. Marshal and President of the Council of Ministers. Married in 1811 Maria José do Livramento de Melo, daughter of the 1st Marquises of Sabugosa, and in 1821 Maria Ana Luísa Filomena de Mendonça, daughter of the 1st Marquises of Loulé; no issue.	

== Claimants under the Republic ==
After the establishment of the Republic in 1910, the state ceased to grant titles of nobility. Since then, the following members of the family have claimed to represent the title:

#	Name	Dates	Titles claimed	Notes	Ref.
2	Maria Luísa da Conceição de Almeida Manoel de Vilhena	1926–1998	2nd Duchess of Terceira (10th Countess of Vila Flor; 3rd Countess of Alpedrinha)	Eldest daughter of Francisco Maria Martinho de Almeida Manuel de Vilhena; writer. Married in 1946 Jaime Augusto Lasso de la Vega Dias de Freitas, only son of the 3rd Counts of Azarujinha.	
3	Lourenço da Bandeira Manoel de Vilhena de Freitas	b. 1973	3rd Duke of Terceira (12th Count of Vila Flor; 6th Count of Azarujinha; 4th Count of Alpedrinha)	Grandson of the preceding, son of Francisco Xavier Manoel de Vilhena Dias de Freitas. Lawyer and associate professor at the Institute of Legal and Political Sciences (ICJP) of the Faculty of Law of the University of Lisbon.	

== Gallery ==
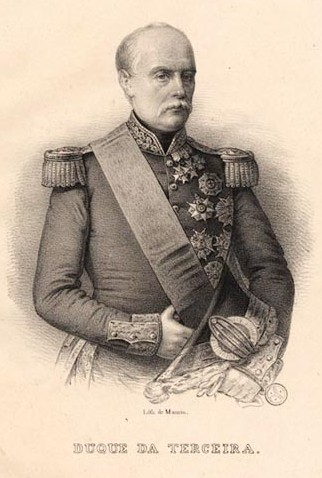
Portrait of António José de Sousa Manuel de Meneses, 1850

Statue of the Duke in Lisbon

Bust of the Duke of Terceira in the Senate Chamber of the São Bento Palace

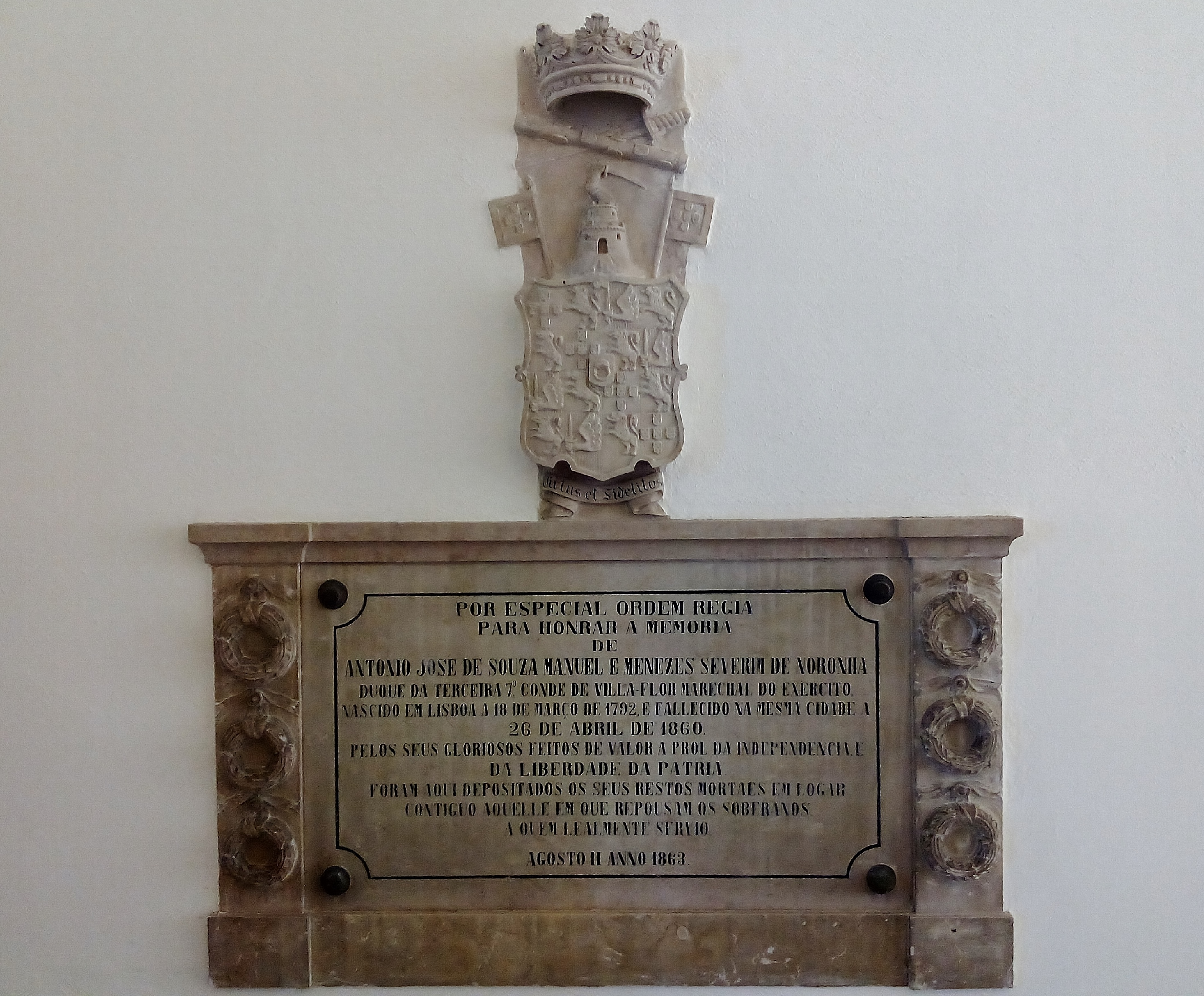
Tomb of the 1st Duke of Terceira, 7th Count of Vila Flor, in the Pantheon of São Vicente de Fora

== See also ==
- Count of Vila Flor
- Count of Alpedrinha
- Count of Azarujinha
- List of dukedoms in Portugal
