= Ficus mucuso =

Conservation status
- Least Concern (IUCN 3.1)

Scientific classification
- Kingdom: Plantae
- Clade: Tracheophytes
- Clade: Angiosperms
- Clade: Eudicots
- Clade: Rosids
- Order: Rosales
- Family: Moraceae
- Genus: Ficus
- Species: F. mucuso

Binomial name
- Ficus mucuso Welw. ex Ficalho

Synonyms
- Ficus corylifolia Warb.; Ficus corylifolia var. glabrescens Warb.; Ficus sidifolia Welw. ex Hiern

Species of plant

Ficus mucuso is a medium to large sized tree within the family Moraceae. It is native to tropical Africa, ranging from Guinea Bissau in the west to Ethiopia in the east, and south to Angola and Tanzania. It grows in lowland tropical moist forest.

== Description ==
A medium-sized to tall sized tree, Ficus mucuso can reach an height of 30 m, sometimes up to 40m; the plant commonly has prominent plank-like buttressed roots that sometimes extend for about 4 meters up the trunk. The bark is smooth, cinnamon brown in color and rarely scaly. Leaves have stipules and petiole, stipules tend to be caducous while petiole is hairy, up to and 10 cm long. Surface of leaves can be rough or sometimes smooth, with a cordate base and acuminate apex. Figs can be found on branches of the species, they are globular in shape, and are commonly green when young becoming yellow to orange when ripe.

== Ecology ==
The figs of the species are eaten by avian wildlife that includes the black-billed turcaco.

== Uses ==
Among the Baganda people of Uganda, wood obtained from Ficus mucuso are carved to make drums.
