= Carlos Lobo de Ávila =

Portuguese academic, writer, journalist and politician

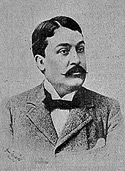
- Born: Carlos de Orta Lobo de Ávila; 17 April 1860; Lisbon, Portugal
- Died: 9 September 1895 (aged 35); Sintra, Portugal
- Occupations: Journalist and politician
- Known for: Two ministerial positions between 1893 and 1895; member of Life's Vanquished

Carlos de Orta Lobo de Ávila (17 March 1860 – 9 September 1895), often referred to as Lobo d'Ávila, was an aristocrat, writer, journalist and politician who was also a parliamentary deputy and minister. He became famous in Portuguese intellectual circles at the time as being a member of the group that called themselves Life's Vanquished (Portuguese: Vencidos da Vida).

== Background ==
Lobo de Ávila was born in Lisbon on 17 March 1860, the son of Joaquim Tomás Lobo de Ávila, 1st Count of Valbom, and his wife, Maria Francisca de Paula de Orta, daughter of António José de Orta, 1st Viscount of Orta, and his wife Manuela de Jesús Thoronjo. He was thus linked by birth to the Portuguese aristocracy, and to its financial and political circles.

== Writing ==
With a penchant for writing, Lobo de Ávila first published in 1878, at the age of 18, when he was a law student at the University of Coimbra. This was a travel book entitled A Traveller's Portfolio: Pencil Notes, which was intended to be published as a serial in a Portuguese newspaper, Diário da Manhã. During that time, he also wrote for the periodical Revista Literária in Coimbra, publishing, with Luís de Magalhães, a set of pamphlets of social and political criticism that appeared under the title of Zumbidos. He also wrote for several other publications in Coimbra, often using pseudonyms.

Lobo de Ávila published in Ilustrado a set of much-appreciated articles of analysis and criticism about a proposed draft revision of the Constitutional Charter of the Portuguese Monarchy. However, in 1889 he founded and edited the daily O Tempo, which later became the organ of those supporting such proposals.

Lobo de Ávila was responsible for finalising the historical book, O Príncipe Perfeito, on the subject of King João II of Portugal, by fellow member of the Vencidos da Vida, Oliveira Martins, which the author could not complete before his death.

== Politics ==
Lobo de Ávila obtained a Bachelor of Law degree with distinction from the Faculty of Law of the University of Coimbra, but in June 1884, even before obtaining graduation, he had already been elected as a Deputy to Portugal’s parliament, known as the Cortes, representing the Progressive Party. In December 1893, he became the Minister for Public Works, Commerce and Industry in the first government presided over by Ernesto Hintze Ribeiro. In September 1894, he was transferred to the Ministry of Foreign Affairs, a position he held when he died.

== Life’s Vanquished ==
Life's Vanquished (Portuguese: Vencidos da Vida) was the name given by the members to an informal group of intellectuals in Lisbon in the last two decades of the 19th century. Among the Vanquished were some of the writers, politicians, and aristocrats that had strived to modernise the country in their youth. Their perceived failure led them to channel their disenchantment into an ironic decadent dilettantism. They met weekly for champagne suppers, and Lobo de Ávila’s newspaper, O Tempo, was the unofficial organ of the group. Apart from Lobo de Ávila, members included the novelist José Maria de Eça de Queirós; the diplomat, the Marquis of Soveral; the writer Ramalho Ortigão;he aristocratic botanist, the Count of Ficalho; and Oliveira Martins. Others, including King Carlos, were occasionally invited to join their dinners.
