= Count of Alpedrinha =

- Coronet of a Portuguese count
- Creation date: 30 August 1854
- Created by: Pedro V of Portugal
- Peerage: Kingdom of Portugal
- First holder: José Sebastião de Saldanha de Oliveira e Daun
- Last holder: José Sebastião de Saldanha de Oliveira e Daun
- Present holder: Lourenço da Bandeira Manoel de Vilhena de Freitas (claimant)
- Remainder to: Two lives
- Extinction date: 1910 (monarchy abolished)
- Former seats: Arroios Palace, Lisbon

Count of Alpedrinha (in portuguese: Conde de Alpedrinha) was a Portuguese title of nobility created for two lives by King Pedro V by decree of 30 August 1854 and royal letter of 26 December 1860 in favour of José Sebastião de Saldanha de Oliveira e Daun.

== History ==
The 1st Count, José Sebastião de Saldanha Oliveira e Daun (1778–1855), was the son of the 1st Counts of Rio Maior and a maternal grandson of the Marquis of Pombal. A law graduate of the University of Coimbra, he was a member of the Overseas Council and a judge of the Supreme Court of Justice, from which he retired with the honours of a Councillor of State, and vedor (steward) to Infanta Isabel Maria. He lived at his palace of Arroios in Lisbon, where he hosted the Duke of Sussex during the Peninsular War.

In 1799 he married his first cousin Maria Leonor Carolina da Conceição Manuel de Vilhena da Costa Freire Martins da Fonseca (1781–1855), also a granddaughter of the Marquis of Pombal, who had succeeded to the lordship of Pancas and was lady of the town of Zibreira, alcaidessa-mor (governor) of Alegrete and administrator of the entails of Pancas, Alpedrinha and Tapada da Cubeira. Through this marriage the 1st Count became lord of Zibreira and of those entails and alcaide-mor of Alegrete.

The title was granted for two lives, but the second life was not taken up until the 20th century. On the death of the 1st Count, the house passed to his eldest son, Cristóvão Manuel de Vilhena (1799–1876), a cavalry captain and aide-de-camp to King Miguel, and on his death to his grandson Salvador Manuel de Vilhena (1830–1907), who became representative of the title of Count of Alpedrinha and died without issue. The 1st Count's second son, João Manuel de Vilhena e Saldanha, married in 1834 Francisca Xavier Teles da Silva, widow of the 1st Marquis of Chaves, from whom he was judicially separated in 1839; they had no children.

The title was later renewed among the descendants of Salvador's sister, Maria Benedita da Conceição Correia de Sá Manuel de Vilhena (1826–1896), who married Martinho Lourenço de Almeida, of the house of the Marquises of Lavradio, and was the mother of Tomás Maria de Almeida Manuel de Vilhena, 8th Count of Vila Flor.

== Coat of arms ==
The 1st Count used the arms of the Costa family, lords of Pancas, surmounted by a count's coronet.

On the family tomb in Alto de São João Cemetery, Lisbon, the following arrangement is carved. The shield is per pale. The dexter half is divided into eight quarters: the 1st, 2nd, 7th and 8th bear the arms of Manuel (the wing grasping a sword in the 1st, the lion in the 2nd, and the same charges alternated in the 7th and 8th); the 3rd bears the arms of Saldanha; the 4th and 5th bear the royal arms of the Kingdom in the form used by the Sousa family, but without their alternating quarters; and the 6th bears the arms of Oliveira, whose olive tree appears transformed into a palm tree. The sinister half, azure (shown by hatching), bears on the dexter side eight ribs palewise in pairs, facing alternately to dexter and sinister, and on the sinister side the wheel of Saint Catherine crossed bendwise sinister by a sword point downwards, an altered form of the arms of the Costa family of Alpedrinha. Above the shield is a count's coronet.

== Counts of Alpedrinha (1854) ==
#	Holder	Dates	Titles	Notes	Ref.
1	José Sebastião de Saldanha de Oliveira e Daun	1778–1855	1st Count of Alpedrinha	Title granted for two lives by decree of 30 August 1854 and royal letter of 26 December 1860. Member of the Overseas Council, retired judge of the Supreme Court of Justice with the honours of a Councillor of State, and colonel of militia. Married in 1799 his first cousin Maria Leonor Carolina da Conceição Manuel de Vilhena da Costa Freire Martins da Fonseca, lady of Pancas, daughter of Cristóvão Manuel de Vilhena and of Maria Francisca Xavier Eva Anselma de Carvalho e Daun.	

== Claimants under the Republic ==
After the establishment of the Republic in 1910, the state ceased to grant titles of nobility. Since then, the following members of the family have claimed to represent the title:

#	Name	Dates	Titles claimed	Notes	Ref.
2	Francisco Maria Martinho de Almeida Manuel de Vilhena	b. 1898	2nd Count of Alpedrinha (9th Count of Vila Flor)	Eldest son of the 8th Count of Vila Flor and great-great-grandson of the 1st Count of Alpedrinha; born in Porto. Married in 1925 Maria de Lourdes Correia de Sampaio de Melo e Castro, daughter of the Viscounts of Castelo Novo, and in 1947 Maria Josefina de Magalhães Wandschneider, daughter of Guilherme Augusto Wandschneider, consul of Russia and Denmark in Porto.	
3	Maria Luísa da Conceição de Almeida Manoel de Vilhena	1926–1998	3rd Countess of Alpedrinha (2nd Duchess of Terceira; 10th Countess of Vila Flor)	Eldest daughter of the preceding, by his first marriage; born in Lisbon; writer. Married in 1946, in Lisbon, Jaime Augusto Lasso de la Vega Dias de Freitas.	
4	Lourenço da Bandeira Manoel de Vilhena de Freitas	b. 1973	4th Count of Alpedrinha (3rd Duke of Terceira; 12th Count of Vila Flor; 6th Count of Azarujinha)	Eldest son of the preceding. Lawyer and associate professor at the Institute of Legal and Political Sciences (ICJP) of the Faculty of Law of the University of Lisbon.	

== See also ==
- Count of Vila Flor
- Duke of Terceira
- Count of Azarujinha
- Count of Rio Maior
