= Count of Azarujinha =

- Coronet of a Portuguese count
- Creation date: 23 September 1890
- Created by: Carlos I of Portugal
- Peerage: Kingdom of Portugal
- First holder: António Augusto Dias de Freitas
- Last holder: Libânio Augusto Severo Dias de Freitas (monarchy abolished)
- Present holder: Lourenço da Bandeira Manoel de Vilhena de Freitas (claimant)
- Remainder to: Life grant
- Subsidiary titles: Viscount of Azarujinha (1870)
- Extinction date: 1910 (monarchy abolished)

Count of Azarujinha (in portuguese: Conde de Azarujinha) was a Portuguese title of nobility created as a life title by King Carlos I by decree of 23 September 1890 in favour of António Augusto Dias de Freitas, until then Viscount of Azarujinha.

The countship arose from the elevation of the title of Viscount of Azarujinha, granted to the same holder by King Luís I in 1870, which had only one holder. The title of count was renewed for life to the 1st Count's son in 1904.

== History ==
The title of Count of Azarujinha originated in that of Viscount of Azarujinha, which King Luís I granted for life to António Augusto Dias de Freitas by decree of 11 August 1870. By decree of King Carlos I of 23 September 1890, the same holder was raised to the rank of Grandee with the title of Count of Azarujinha, also for life. The 1870 decree was not registered in the Torre do Tombo archive.

António Augusto Dias de Freitas was born on 15 February 1830 and died on 13 February 1904. He was the son of Captain António Dias de Freitas, knight of the Order of the Tower and Sword, and of Libânia Carlota Gonçalves. His father, an honorary captain in the Army, was a landowner and wholesale merchant in Lisbon.

He studied at the Military College and went on to the Polytechnic School, which he had to leave at the end of his second year because of serious illness. After his father's death he took over, together with Jorge Croft, later 1st Viscount of Graça, the management of the glassworks at Marinha Grande, whose reputation he succeeded in restoring. A relapse forced him to seek treatment abroad for several years; on his return to Portugal he began a political career, was elected deputy for the Regenerator Party in several legislatures and was appointed a peer of the Realm by royal letter of 29 December 1881.

He received the rank of fidalgo-cavaleiro of the Royal Household by charter of 30 September 1862, was a commander of the Order of Our Lady of the Conception of Vila Viçosa and a councillor of Lisbon City Council. He was also a director of the Companhia do Mercado da Praça da Figueira (Praça da Figueira Market Company) and a member of the supervisory boards of other companies. In the glass industry, he held the concession of the Royal Glass Factory of Marinha Grande.

In 1855 he married Joana Amália Correia de Sequeira Pinto, born on 26 October 1825. She was the daughter of Diogo António Correia de Sequeira Pinto, fidalgo-cavaleiro of the Royal Household, member of His Majesty's Council, judge of the Supreme Court of Justice, enfermeiro-mor (chief administrator) of São José Hospital in Lisbon, and peer of the Realm by royal letter of 5 March 1853, who died on 4 August 1872, and of Maria José da Rocha Ferreira de Sequeira Pinto.

His son, Libânio Augusto Severo Dias de Freitas, was born on 16 September 1871 and died on 27 February 1930. A fidalgo-cavaleiro of the Royal Household, commander of the Order of Our Lady of the Conception of Vila Viçosa and a major landowner, he received the title of Count of Azarujinha, for life, by decree of King Carlos I of 27 May 1904.

=== Properties ===
The 1st Count assembled a landed estate, mainly in the Alentejo, with properties at Azaruja, at São Miguel de Machede (Herdade da Azarujinha), and in Campo Maior, Alandroal, Montemor, Benavente, Vila Franca, Cartaxo and Sintra. He also owned the Palace of the Count of Azarujinha and the Coelheiros estate, near Igrejinha, with its adjoining estates.

In Alcochete, he owned several salt pans. In Lisbon he lived at Campo de Santana, in a house he later leased to the Ophthalmological Institute. He bought the Pombeiro Palace, now the Italian Embassy, from the Duchess of Saldanha. He also owned a chalet in Estoril, which gave its name to Azarujinha Beach, another in Paço de Arcos, a palace at Azaruja, the Quinta do Porto in Massamá, and an estate at São João da Coidiceira, Loures. The chalet at São João do Estoril, known as the Chalé Azarujinha, was still the family's residence in the mid-1980s.

== Viscounts of Azarujinha (1870) ==
#	Holder	Dates	Titles	Notes	Ref.
1	António Augusto Dias de Freitas	1830–1904	1st Viscount of Azarujinha (1st Count of Azarujinha)	Title granted for life by decree of 11 August 1870 from King Luís I; raised to count in 1890. Married in 1855 Joana Amália Correia de Sequeira Pinto, daughter of Diogo António Correia de Sequeira Pinto, peer of the Realm and judge of the Supreme Court of Justice.	

== Counts of Azarujinha (1890) ==
#	Holder	Dates	Titles	Notes	Ref.
1	António Augusto Dias de Freitas	1830–1904	1st Count of Azarujinha (1st Viscount of Azarujinha)	Title granted for life by decree of 23 September 1890 from King Carlos I. Peer of the Realm, deputy and councillor of Lisbon City Council.	
2	Libânio Augusto Severo Dias de Freitas	1871–1930	2nd Count of Azarujinha	Son of the preceding. Title renewed for life by decree of 27 May 1904 from King Carlos I. Fidalgo-cavaleiro of the Royal Household and commander of the Order of Our Lady of the Conception of Vila Viçosa. Married in 1893 Antónia Paiva de Albuquerque de Lemos, daughter of Cavalry Colonel Jaime Malaquias de Lemos, commander-general of the Municipal Guards; the marriage ended in divorce.	

== Claimants under the Republic ==
After the establishment of the Republic in 1910, the state ceased to grant titles of nobility. Since then, the following members of the family have claimed to represent the title:

#	Name	Dates	Titles claimed	Notes	Ref.
3	Jaime Augusto de Albuquerque de Lemos Dias de Freitas	1894–1974	3rd Count of Azarujinha	Eldest son of the 2nd Count; born and died in Lisbon. Married on 7 April 1920, in Lisbon, María Aurora Lasso de la Vega y Jiménez (b. 1896), daughter of Javier Lasso de la Vega y Cortezo, doctor of law, and of María de Jesús Jiménez y Placer Álvarez Cabral, daughter of the Marquises of Bejarano.	
4	Jaime Augusto Lasso de la Vega Dias de Freitas	1922–1978	4th Count of Azarujinha	Only son of the preceding; born in São João do Estoril and died in Lisbon. Married in 1946, in Lisbon, Maria Luísa da Conceição de Almeida Manoel de Vilhena (b. 1926), a writer, eldest daughter of the 9th Count of Vila Flor and 2nd Count of Alpedrinha by his first marriage.	
5	Francisco Xavier Manoel de Vilhena Dias de Freitas	1947–2007	5th Count of Azarujinha (11th Count of Vila Flor)	Eldest son of the preceding; born in São João do Estoril. Mounted bullfighter (cavaleiro tauromáquico) and landowner. Married Cristina Freire da Bandeira Barata (b. 1951).	
6	Lourenço da Bandeira Manoel de Vilhena de Freitas	b. 1973	6th Count of Azarujinha (3rd Duke of Terceira; 12th Count of Vila Flor; 4th Count of Alpedrinha)	Eldest son of the preceding. Lawyer and associate professor at the Institute of Legal and Political Sciences (ICJP) of the Faculty of Law of the University of Lisbon.	

== Gallery ==
António Augusto Dias de Freitas, 1st Count of Azarujinha

== See also ==
- Count of Alpedrinha
- Count of Vila Flor
- Duke of Terceira
- List of countships in Portugal
- List of dukedoms in Portugal
