= Marquis of Sabugosa =

- Coronet of a Portuguese marquis and arms of the Marquises of Sabugosa
- Creation date: 13 May 1804
- Created by: Maria I of Portugal
- Peerage: Kingdom of Portugal
- First holder: António Maria de Melo da Silva César de Meneses
- Last holder: António Maria José de Melo da Silva César e Meneses
- Present holder: António Vasco de Mello Silva César e Menezes (claimant)
- Subsidiary titles: Count of Sabugosa; Count of São Lourenço
- Extinction date: 1910 (monarchy abolished)
- Seats: Sabugosa Palace, Lisbon

Marquis of Sabugosa (in portuguese: Marquês de Sabugosa) was a Portuguese title of nobility created by royal letter of 13 May 1804 issued by the Prince Regent John, the future King John VI, in the name of Queen Maria I, in favour of António Maria de Melo da Silva César de Meneses, 7th Count of São Lourenço and 5th Count of Sabugosa.

The title was renewed in 1815 and in 1862 and always remained in the same house, which also held the titles of Count of Sabugosa and Count of São Lourenço, as well as the offices of alcaide-mor (governor) of Elvas and alferes-mor of the Realm.

== History ==
The title of marquis was granted to a holder who had already inherited the houses of Sabugosa and São Lourenço, which had been united since the marriage in 1720 of Mariana Rosa de Lencastre, heiress of the Counts of Sabugosa, to Rodrigo de Melo da Silva, 5th Count of São Lourenço. António Maria de Melo da Silva César de Meneses, their grandson, pursued a military career, which he ended with the rank of lieutenant general, and was alferes-mor of the Realm and a gentleman of the bedchamber to Queen Maria I.

His son, José António de Melo da Silva César de Meneses, was governor and captain-general of the Azores from 1805 to 1806, commanded a division against the French invasions during the Peninsular War, rose to the rank of lieutenant general, and was a peer of the Realm and president of the Overseas Council. The title of marquis was renewed for him by decree of 12 October 1815, the same day on which he was promoted to lieutenant general. He had been a member of Freemasonry since 1808; in 1828 he sat in the noble estate of the Cortes of Lisbon as proxy for his son, the 9th Count of São Lourenço. His son and successor, António José de Melo da Silva César de Meneses, never became marquis, having been a supporter of King Miguel, and the title was never renewed for him under the constitutional monarchy.

The 3rd Marquis, António Maria José de Melo da Silva César e Meneses, for whom the title was renewed by decree of 30 April 1862 was a figure in the Historic Party and later in the Progressive Party. As a peer of the Realm, in 1869 he tabled a motion that brought down the government led by the Marquis of Sá da Bandeira. He was Minister of the Kingdom in 1873, in the government of the Duke of Loulé, and Minister of the Navy in 1879, in the government of Anselmo José Braamcamp, as well as civil governor of Lisbon and of Braga and oficial-mor of the Royal Household. Some years before his death in 1897, he sold off much of the former Quinta Cesária, the estate surrounding the Sabugosa Palace, for urban development.

The arms used by the marquises in the 20th century are quarterly, with the arms of Lencastre, César, Melo and Silva, and Guedes, the crest of the Césares and a marquis's coronet.

According to the family, the house's various titles were distributed across different generations and were traditionally conferred on the occasion of marriage.

The Sabugosa Palace, which remains in the family's ownership and is still their residence, was classified as a monument of public interest in 2012. In 2007 the family archive, kept at the palace, received the Vasco Vilalva Prize of the Calouste Gulbenkian Foundation.

== Marquises of Sabugosa (1804) ==
#	Holder	Dates	Titles	Notes	Ref.
1	António Maria de Melo da Silva César de Meneses	1743–1805	1st Marquis of Sabugosa (7th Count of São Lourenço; 5th Count of Sabugosa)	Lieutenant general; alferes-mor of the Realm. Raised to marquis by royal letter of 13 May 1804. Married twice: in 1760, Joaquina José Benta Maria de Meneses (1744–1783), daughter of the 4th Marquises of Marialva; and in 1791, Ana Francisca de Sousa (1758–1798), daughter of the 5th Counts of Vila Flor and widow of João de Melo Homem.	
2	José António de Melo da Silva César de Meneses	1763–1839	2nd Marquis of Sabugosa (8th Count of São Lourenço; 6th Count of Sabugosa)	Son of the preceding; governor and captain-general of the Azores. Title renewed by decree of 12 October 1815. Married in 1793 Leonor Maria José de Sampaio (1770–1816), daughter of the 1st Counts of Sampaio. In 1818 he secretly married Leonor Peregrina Vieira de Matos (1785–1843), with whom he had no issue.	
3	António Maria José de Melo da Silva César e Meneses	1825–1897	3rd Marquis of Sabugosa (10th Count of São Lourenço; 8th Count of Sabugosa)	Grandson of the preceding; son of António José de Melo da Silva César de Meneses, 9th Count of São Lourenço, to whom the title was not renewed. Minister of the Kingdom and of the Navy. Title renewed by decree of 30 April 1862. Married in 1852 Maria do Carmo da Cunha Portugal e Meneses (1832–1910), honorary lady-in-waiting to Queen Maria Pia.	

== Claimants under the Republic ==
After the establishment of the Republic in 1910, the state ceased to grant titles of nobility. Since then, the following members of the family have claimed to represent the title:

#	Name	Dates	Titles claimed	Notes	Ref.
4	António Vasco José de Mello Silva César e Menezes	1903–?	4th Marquis of Sabugosa (13th Count of São Lourenço; 11th Count of Sabugosa)	Great-grandson of the preceding and son of the 12th Counts of São Lourenço; born in Cascais; engineer. Married in 1929 Maria Isabel de Jesus O'Neill (b. 1910), daughter of Hugo O'Neill, a naval officer.	
5	António Vasco de Mello Silva César e Menezes	b. 1989	5th Marquis of Sabugosa	Son of António Maria de Mello Silva César e Menezes (b. 1959) and grandson of António Vasco de Mello Silva César e Menezes (b. 1931). In October 2026, the family was the subject of an episode of the television segment Sangue Azul on SIC.	

== Gallery ==
António Maria José de Melo da Silva César e Meneses, 3rd Marquis of Sabugosa (1825–1897)

King Manuel II with Infante Afonso, the Count of Arnoso and the Marquis of Sabugosa

== See also ==
- Count of Sabugosa
- Count of São Lourenço
- List of countships in Portugal
- List of marquisates in Portugal
- Sabugosa Palace
