= Carlos de Lima Mayer =

Portuguese doctor and intellectual (1846–1910)

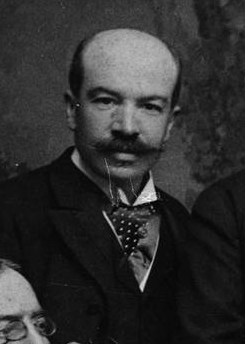
- Born: Carlos Félix de Lima Mayer; 11 February 1846; Santos-o-Velho, Lisbon, Portugal
- Died: 28 February 1910 (aged 64); Lisbon, Portugal
- Education: Medicine at University of Coimbra and at Lisbon
- Occupation: Physician
- Known for: Member of Life's Vanquished

Carlos de Lima Mayer (11 February 1846 – 28 February 1910) was a medical doctor, businessman and intellectual who belonged to the group of late 19th-century Portuguese, known as Life's Vanquished.

== Early life ==
Mayer was born on 11 February 1846, in Santos-o-Velho, Lisbon. His parents were António Mayer and Maria Clementina de Lima. His brother was Adolfo de Lima Mayer, who built the Palacete Mayer in the centre of Lisbon, which later became the Spanish Embassy, and whose land became a major entertainment centre in Lisbon, known as Parque Mayer. Carlos Mayer married Amélia da Veiga Araújo. Their daughter was Veva de Lima, an eccentric socialite who ran literary salons, and their granddaughter was Maria Ulrich, a pioneering educationalist in Portugal.

== Education ==
Mayer attended the Faculty of Medicine of the University of Coimbra, followed by the Medical-Surgical School of Lisbon, finishing his medical studies in Belgium and France.

== Life ==
After completing his studies, he then briefly left medicine to manage family companies in Mozambique, Angola, the Azores and the Algarve. Although not a writer himself, Mayer became a member of the group of intellectuals known as the Vencidos de Vida, that included people such as the writers José Maria de Eça de Queirós and Ramalho Ortigão, and the diplomat, Luís Pinto de Soveral, 1st Marquis of Soveral.

== Death ==
Mayer became progressively blind, and committed suicide by gunshot, on 28 February 1910, aged 64, in Lisbon. He is remembered by a street named after him in Lisbon. In 1945, his daughter published a book about him, entitled O único Vencido da Vida que também o foi da morte (The only member of Life's Vanquished who was also cheated of death).
