= José António de Melo da Silva César e Meneses =

5th Captain-General of the Azores
- In office 1804–1806
- Monarch: John VI
- Preceded by: Lourenço José Maria de Almada Cirne Peixoto
- Succeeded by: Miguel António de Melo
- Constituency: Azores

Personal details
- Born: José António de Melo da Silva César e Meneses; 19 November 1763 Lisbon
- Died: 10 December 1839 (aged 76) Lisbon
- Citizenship: Kingdom of Portugal
- Occupation: Governor General

José António de Melo da Silva César e Meneses (Lisbon, 19 November 1763 — Lisbon, 10 December 1839), the 8th Count of São Lourenço, 2nd Count of Sabugosa, alcaide-mor of Elvas, ensign-chief of Portugal, gentleman of Royal Household, holder of the Grand-Cross in the Order of Christ and Commander in the Order of the Tower and Sword, was a high noble and general in the Portuguese Army, who between 1804 and 1806 was the 4th Captain General of the Azores.

== Biography ==
Born in Ajuda, in the recently constructed Palace of Sabugosa, he was the son of D. António Maria de Melo da Silva César de Meneses, the 1st Marquis and 5th Count of Sabugosa, and his wife Joaquina José Benta de Meneses.

=== Captaincy-General ===
As a Portuguese aristocrat, he carried on his family's military tradition, beginning his career as a cadet in 1780. He became a colonel within a few years, leading to appointment on 29 August 1804 as Governor and Captain-General of the Azores. He disembarked in Angra do Heroísmo on September 12, and took up his post on 17 October. One of his earliest tasks was to report on the state of the Captaincy General for the Regency.

With his eldest son António José de Melo Silva César e Meneses as aide-de-camp, he remained in the Azores for almost a year and a half before returning to Lisbon after the death of his father, the 1st Marquess of Sabugosa, on 4 June 1805.

Since was he only in his position for a short time, the Count of São Lourenço did not receive any appreciation from the local population. There are also few records of his administrative style. The most important was an officio from 13 January 1805, transcribed in the tenth volume of the Arquivo dos Açores. José António concentrated on agriculture, and in particular the question of how to use uncultivated lands and the emigration problem, which was making it difficult to continue the agricultural tradition. The count was also involved in public education and help for foundlings abandoned at convents, at risk from the high child mortality rate. In addition, there was the need to concede the island of Graciosa emigration privileges to Brazil.

His tenure included the construction of a new pier in Praia, the establishment of a seminary in Angra and implementation of the military reorganization of the Azores that had been planned by his predecessors. Problems with agriculture came to affect the island of São Miguel; the lack of cereals in the largest island in the archipelago caused a famine, forcing the captain to distribute free corn.

Owing to the trauma on São Miguel, the Micaelense initiated a movement for emancipation from the Captains General, which would allow them to deal directly with Lisbon, rather than go through the King's representatives in the archipelago. This was an issue of individual islands' autonomy as much as a question of economic power, since most wealth created in the other islands at that time was sent to Angra.

=== Later life ===
With the death of his father, José António inherited the immense wealth of the House of Sabugosa, and upon his request, was replaced as the Captain-General of the Azores. Having terminated his post in the government of the Azores, years later he returned to service in his regiment, was promoted to the post of brigadier in 1808 and later, successively, major general in 1810, and lieutenant general in 1815. By the end of his military career he was a member of the Council of War.

Defender of the legitimist pretender Miguel I of Portugal, he was a deputy in the Junta dos Três Estados and president of the Overseas Council. In 1826 he was made a peer of the realm, and exercised this role until the dissolution of the Portuguese Cortes that preceded the beginning of the Portuguese Liberal Wars.
