= António Cândido (politician) =

Portuguese politician

António Cândido Ribeiro da Costa GCSE
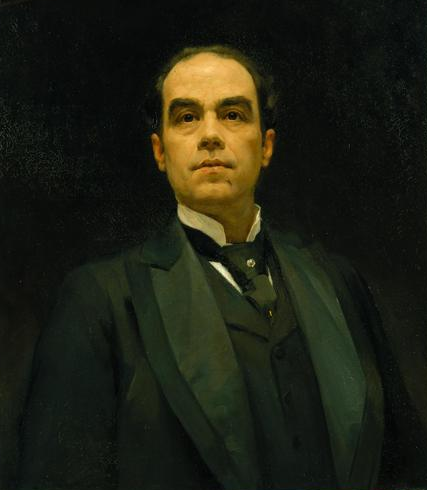

Attorney General of Portugal
- In office 1898–1910

Personal details
- Born: 29 March 1850 Amarante, Portugal
- Died: 9 November 1922 (aged 72) Amarante
- Party: Progressive Party
- Education: University of Coimbra
- Profession: University professor; politician

António Cândido Ribeiro da Costa (1850 – 1922), known as António Cândido or Tony Candy, was a Portuguese professor, intellectual and politician, who gained fame as an extraordinary parliamentary speaker.

== Early life ==
António Cândido was born in Amarante in northern Portugal on 29 March 1850 (some sources say 1852). He was the son of Ana Joaquina Ribeiro and Father José Joaquim da Costa Pinheiro, priest of the parish of Candemil in the Amarante municipality, who only acknowledged paternity legally in 1885 in the will published after his death. Due to his father's influence he seemed initially to be destined for an ecclesiastical life, attending a theology course in Braga from 1867 to 1871. He was not ordained as a priest, however, and instead enrolled at the Faculty of Law of Coimbra University. He graduated in law and theology and obtained a doctorate in law in 1878 on the topic of "Principles and questions of political philosophy: Scientific conditions of the right of suffrage", in which he promoted democracy, administrative decentralization and proportional representation and which was considered a foundation for political science in Portugal. Teaching at the university, he was made a full professor in 1891.

== Career ==
From an early age Cândido revealed himself as a distinguished orator. He became known for his funeral eulogies including those of the first Duke of Loulé in 1875 and the writer Alexandre Herculano in 1877. This reputation as an orator would become fully established when he became a member of the Portuguese parliament. He joined the Progressive Party, led by his close friend, Anselmo José Braamcamp, at its foundation in 1876, and was a deputy in parliament for that party in 1880-1881 (representing Amarante), 1884-1887 (representing Coimbra) and 1887-1889 (representing Aveiro). In 1888 he left the party due to political disagreements, but returned in 1890. His speaking skills led to the writer, Camilo Castelo Branco giving him the nickname of the "Sea Eagle".

He served as the minister of the interior in 1890-1891, being responsible for defeating the Revolt of January 31, 1891, which was the first attempt to install a republican government in Portugal. He was made a peer in 1891, taking a seat in the Chamber of Most Worthy Peers and being elected president of that chamber in 1905. One of his protégés was Sidónio Pais, who went on to become the fourth president of Portugal.

Cândido served as president of the Royal Academy of Sciences and is known also as a member of the Vencidos da Vida, a group of monarchist intellectuals that included the author Eça de Queiroz.

At the time of the 5 October 1910 revolution, which overthrew the monarchy, he was the Attorney General of the Crown and Treasury, a position that he had held since 1898. He was removed from the position after the revolution and then abandoned political life, contributing to the pro-monarchy press.

== Death ==
Cândido died in Amarante on 9 November 1922 (some sources say October 24, 1922). He is remembered by a bronze statue in Amarante. A street in Lisbon bears his name. A bust of Cândido was unveiled in the National Assembly in 1951. He had been awarded the Grand Cross of the Military Order of Saint James of the Sword in 1900.
