= Maria Ulrich =

Portuguese educationalist (1908–1988)

- Born: Maria de Lima Mayer Ulrich; 9 March 1908; Coimbra, Portugal
- Died: 25 November 1988 (aged 80); Lisbon
- Citizenship: Portuguese
- Known for: Educationalist who established one of the first schools for teachers in Portugal

Maria Ulrich was a Portuguese educationalist who founded one of the first colleges for teachers in Portugal.

== Early life ==
Maria de Lima Mayer Ulrich was born in Coimbra, Portugal on 9 March 1908. She was the daughter of Genoveva de Lima Mayer, better known as Veva de Lima, and Rui Ulrich, at that time a professor at the University of Coimbra. After the overthrow of the Portuguese monarchy in 1910, the family left Portugal and went to live in Biarritz in France, where she was brought up, studying in France and England. In 1934, her father was appointed as Portuguese ambassador to London and, at the age of 26, she accompanied her family there. Returning to Portugal when her father's assignment was completed, she found living there difficult and contemplated emigrating to France.

== An educationalist ==
In Lisbon Ulrich worked with the Juventude Independente Catolica Feminina (Independent Catholic Women's Youth). However, in 1950 her father was appointed for a second term as ambassador to London and she again accompanied him. Having decided that she should work in the field of education, which in Portugal at that time was very poor, she took advantage of her stay in London to prepare for her project of establishing a school for kindergarten teachers. She visited Montessori schools in London and other schools in Paris. She studied the history of education, reading works by pioneers such as Jean-Jacques Rousseau, Friedrich Fröbel, Johann Heinrich Pestalozzi, Ovide Decroly, Édouard Claparède and Célestin Freinet. She maintained regular contact with the Mouvement Chrétien de l'Enfance (Christian Children's Movement) in Paris. Returning to Portugal, Ulrich opened in Lisbon one of the first schools for teachers in Portugal with, initially, just 13 student teachers. In 1957, she founded the Associação de Pedagogia Infantil (Association of childhood teaching). In 1957-58, she established O Nosso Jardim (Our Garden), where children, together with the trainee teachers and in close relationship with the parents, studied in an open environment.

== Later life ==
As the only surviving child, she inherited her parents' estate, much of which she donated to Lisbon City Council in 1986, turning the Casa Veva de Lima (Veva de Lima House), the house where her parents lived and where her mother held famous literary salons, into a living museum. In her will she left funds to create the Maria Ulrich Foundation to support and develop actions in the field of education and culture within a Christian humanist perspective.

== Death ==
Ulrich died in Lisbon on 25 November 1988. A street is named after her in Lisbon, close to the family house.

== Biography ==
- Alves, Luisa Vian. Quem foi Maria Ulrich. Edições Tenacitas - Educação Século XXI; 1. ISBN 9789728758561.
