= Count of Vila Flor =

- Coronet of a Portuguese count and arms of the Manuel de Vilhena family
- Creation date: 14 July 1606 (first); 23 July 1661 (second)
- Created by: Philip II of Portugal (first); Afonso VI of Portugal (second)
- Peerage: Kingdom of Portugal
- First holder: Inácia Quaresma and Luís Enríquez (first); Sancho Manuel de Vilhena (second)
- Last holder: António José de Sousa Manuel de Meneses Severim de Noronha
- Present holder: Lourenço da Bandeira Manoel de Vilhena de Freitas (claimant)
- Remainder to: Life grant (first); hereditary, de juro e herdade (second)
- Extinction date: 1910 (monarchy abolished)
- Seats: Costa do Castelo, Lisbon
- Former seats: Palace of São João da Praça, Lisbon

Count of Vila Flor (in portuguese: Conde de Vila Flor) was a Portuguese title of nobility that was created twice. The first creation was granted by Philip II of Portugal (Philip III of Spain), by royal letter of 14 July 1606, to Inácia Quaresma and her husband, Luís Enríquez; the second, hereditary (de juro e herdade), was granted in the name of King Afonso VI, by dispatch of 29 September 1659 and royal letter of 23 July 1661, to Sancho Manuel de Vilhena. The title refers to Vila Flor, now a locality in the parish of Amieira, in the municipality of Nisa.

The 7th Count was also the only Marquis of Vila Flor and the only Duke of Terceira. After his death without issue in 1860, the representation of the house passed to a line descended from a natural son of the 2nd Count, the lords of Zibreira, which had by then merged with that of the Counts of Alpedrinha.

== History ==
=== First creation (1606) ===
By royal letter of 14 July 1606, Philip II of Portugal granted Inácia Quaresma, lady-in-waiting to Queen Anne and daughter of Manuel Quaresma Barreto, vedor da Fazenda (overseer of the Treasury) to King Sebastian, the title of Countess of Vila Flor for her lifetime, also making her husband, Luís Enríquez, his steward, a count. Their son, also named Luís Enríquez, was 2nd Count of Vila Flor and later Count of Alba de Liste; he died without issue in 1667.

=== Second creation (1661) ===
Sancho Manuel de Vilhena (d. 1677), lord proprietor of Vila Flor, distinguished himself in the Portuguese Restoration War. As governor of Elvas, he withstood the Spanish siege until the victory at the Lines of Elvas on 14 January 1659, for which he was made a Grandee of the Realm with the title of Count of Vila Flor. He later commanded the army at the Battle of Ameixial and was given the governorship of Belém Tower and the office of alcaide-mor (governor) of Alegrete; he was appointed Viceroy of Brazil but died before taking office. A member of the Council of War, he was also appointed governor of the Relação e Casa do Porto (the high court of Porto) for three years, by a provision of 20 December 1668; he took office on 1 June 1670, assuming the military governorship of the district as well, but left the city on 20 December of the same year. He died on 3 February 1677. He was the father of António Manoel de Vilhena, Grand Master of the Order of Malta.

His son, Cristóvão Manuel de Vilhena, received the title by royal letter of 1677 and died unmarried in 1704, leaving only natural children; the eldest, Sancho Manuel de Vilhena, inherited the lordship of Zibreira and the governorship of Alegrete, but not the title. The title passed to the 2nd Count's nephew, Martim Severim de Noronha de Sousa e Meneses, the son of his sister, who was confirmed in 1709, and remained in his line for four more generations. The counts of this line were also copeiro-mor (chief cupbearer) of the Royal Household.

The 7th Count, António José de Sousa Manuel de Meneses Severim de Noronha, who succeeded his father at the age of two in 1795, was raised to Marquis of Vila Flor in 1827, a grant confirmed by royal letter of 14 January 1833, and created Duke of Terceira, with the honours of a Relative of the Crown, in 1832. He died without issue on 26 April 1860.

==== Succession after 1860 ====
On the death of the Duke of Terceira, the representation of the Manuel de Vilhena family passed to the descendants of Sancho Manuel de Vilhena, lord of Zibreira, natural son of the 2nd Count. This line, which had by then merged with that of the lords of Pancas and Counts of Alpedrinha, came to be represented by Maria Benedita Manuel de Vilhena, granddaughter of the 1st Counts of Alpedrinha, whose brother, Salvador, died without issue in 1907. In 1862 Maria Benedita married Martinho Lourenço de Almeida, of the house of the Marquises of Lavradio.

==== Property ====
Among other entailed properties, the 7th Count administered the houses of São João da Praça in Lisbon, where he lived in 1838, and an estate at Sobral, in Alverca. The 8th Count was born at the Arroios Palace, a house of the lords of Pancas that had belonged to the 1st Count of Alpedrinha; in the 20th century the family moved to the Costa do Castelo in Lisbon, where the 8th Count died in 1932.

== Coat of arms ==
The title of the first creation used the arms of the Quaresma family.

The arms of the Manuel family, Counts of Vila Flor, were: quarterly, first and fourth gules, a wing Or ending in a hand proper grasping a sword argent hilted Or; second and third argent, a lion azure (or sable), armed and langued gules. Crest: the charges of the first quarter.

== Counts of Vila Flor (first creation; 1606) ==
| # | Holder | Dates | Titles | Notes | Ref. |
|---|---|---|---|---|---|
| 1 | Inácia Quaresma and Luís Enríquez | — | Countess and Count of Vila Flor | Title granted by royal letter of 14 July 1606 from Philip II of Portugal to Inácia for her lifetime, and to her husband, the king's steward. Inácia was the daughter of Manuel Quaresma Barreto, vedor da Fazenda, and of Filipa Pessanha. | |
| 2 | Luís Enríquez | ?–1667 | 2nd Count of Vila Flor (Count of Alba de Liste) | Son of the preceding. Viceroy of Peru. Died without issue. | |

== Counts of Vila Flor (second creation; 1661) ==
| # | Holder | Dates | Titles | Notes | Ref. |
|---|---|---|---|---|---|
| 1 | Sancho Manuel de Vilhena | c. 1607–1677 | 1st Count of Vila Flor | Made a Grandee of the Realm by dispatch of 29 September 1659 and royal letter of 23 July 1661, after the victory at the Lines of Elvas. Commander of the army at Ameixial; governor of the Relação e Casa do Porto (1668–1670); appointed Viceroy of Brazil. Died 3 February 1677. Married first Ana de Noronha, daughter of Gaspar de Faria Severim, and secondly his niece Joana Manuel, daughter of António Álvares da Cunha, lord of Tábua. | |
| 2 | Cristóvão Manuel de Vilhena | c. 1650–1704 | 2nd Count of Vila Flor | Son of the preceding by his first marriage. Title renewed by royal letter of 11 September 1677 from the Regent Peter. Alcaide-mor of Alegrete. Died unmarried, without legitimate issue. | |
| 3 | Martim Severim de Noronha de Sousa e Meneses | 1673–1733 | 3rd Count of Vila Flor | Nephew of the preceding. Title confirmed by royal letter of 26 January 1709 from King John V. Copeiro-mor and alcaide-mor of Guarda. Married first Maria Antónia da Silva de Melo, daughter of the 1st Viscounts of Asseca, and secondly Luísa Maria de Mendonça, daughter of Tristão da Cunha, governor of Angola. | |
| 4 | Luís Manuel de Sousa e Meneses | 1702–1752 | 4th Count of Vila Flor | Son of the preceding. Title confirmed during his father's lifetime by royal letter of 29 November 1723. Copeiro-mor. Married in 1724 Antónia Caetana Henriques, daughter of Jorge Henriques, 7th lord of Alcáçovas. | |
| 5 | António Francisco de Paula Manuel de Sousa e Meneses | 1725–1791 | 5th Count of Vila Flor | Son of the preceding. Title confirmed by royal letter of 9 November 1753 from King Joseph. Field marshal and governor of Pernambuco. Married in 1741 his aunt Joana Maria Josefa Manuel, daughter of the 3rd Count, and in 1757 his cousin Maria Tomásia Xavier da Silveira. | |
| 6 | António do Pópulo Severim de Noronha de Sousa Manuel e Meneses | 1765–1795 | 6th Count of Vila Flor | Son of the preceding by his second marriage. Title confirmed by royal letter of 15 May 1777 from Queen Maria I. Married in 1792 Maria José de Mendoça, daughter of the 6th Counts of Vale de Reis. | |
| 7 | António José de Sousa Manuel de Meneses Severim de Noronha | 1792–1860 | 7th Count of Vila Flor (1st Duke of Terceira; 1st Marquis of Vila Flor) | Son of the preceding. Title confirmed by royal letter of 21 April 1795; Marquis in 1827 (royal letter of 14 January 1833) and Duke of Terceira in 1832. Married in 1811 Maria José do Livramento de Melo, daughter of the 1st Marquises of Sabugosa, and in 1821 Maria Ana Luísa Filomena de Mendonça, daughter of the 1st Marquises of Loulé; no issue. | |

== Claimants under the Republic ==
After the establishment of the Republic in 1910, the state ceased to grant titles of nobility. Since then, the following members of the family have claimed to represent the title:

| # | Name | Dates | Titles claimed | Notes | Ref. |
|---|---|---|---|---|---|
| 8 | Tomás Maria de Almeida Manuel de Vilhena | 1864–1932 | 8th Count of Vila Flor | Son of Maria Benedita Manuel de Vilhena and Martinho Lourenço de Almeida. Civil governor of Braga and of Funchal, deputy and senator. Married in 1897 Maria José de Azeredo Teixeira de Aguilar, daughter of the 2nd Counts of Samodães. | |
| 9 | Francisco Maria Martinho de Almeida Manuel de Vilhena | b. 1898 | 9th Count of Vila Flor (2nd Count of Alpedrinha) | Son of the preceding. Married in 1925 Maria de Lourdes Correia de Sampaio de Melo e Castro, daughter of the Viscounts of Castelo Novo, and in 1947 Maria Josefina de Magalhães Wandschneider, daughter of Guilherme Augusto Wandschneider, consul of Russia and Denmark in Porto. | |
| 10 | Maria Luísa da Conceição de Almeida Manuel de Vilhena | 1926–1998 | 10th Countess of Vila Flor (2nd Duchess of Terceira; 3rd Countess of Alpedrinha) | Eldest daughter of the preceding, by his first marriage; writer. Married in 1946 Jaime Augusto Lasso de la Vega Dias de Freitas, only son of the 3rd Counts of Azarujinha. | |
| 11 | Francisco Xavier Manoel de Vilhena Dias de Freitas | 1947–2007 | 11th Count of Vila Flor (5th Count of Azarujinha) | Eldest son of the preceding. Mounted bullfighter (cavaleiro tauromáquico) and landowner. Married Cristina Freire da Bandeira Barata. | |
| 12 | Lourenço da Bandeira Manoel de Vilhena de Freitas | b. 1973 | 12th Count of Vila Flor (3rd Duke of Terceira; 6th Count of Azarujinha; 4th Count of Alpedrinha) | Eldest son of the preceding. Lawyer and associate professor at the Institute of Legal and Political Sciences (ICJP) of the Faculty of Law of the University of Lisbon. | |

== Gallery ==
Tomás de Almeida Manuel de Vilhena, 8th Count of Vila Flor (1864–1932)

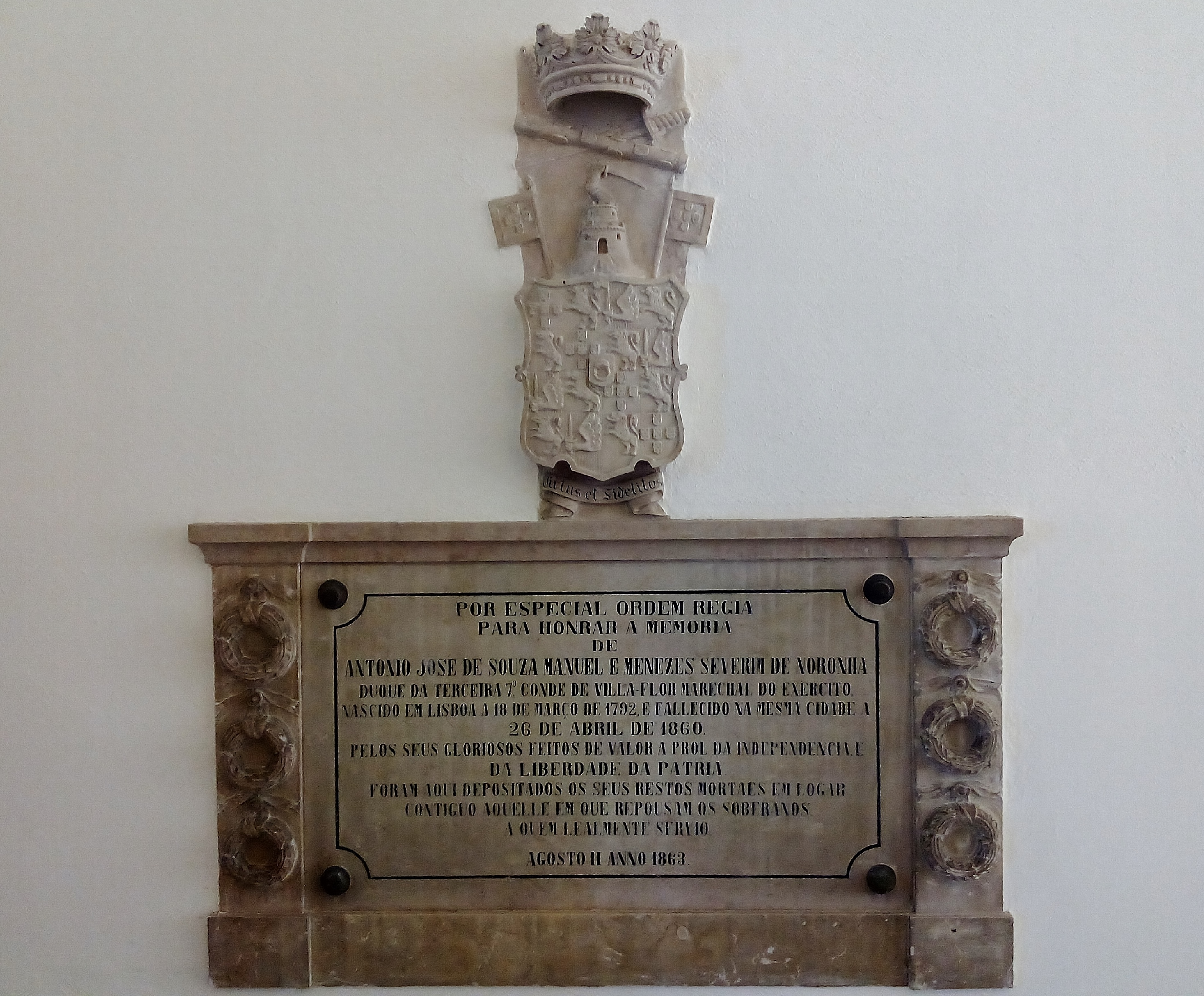
Tomb of the 7th Count of Vila Flor, 1st Duke of Terceira, in the Pantheon of São Vicente de Fora

Portrait of Sancho Manuel de Vilhena, 1st Count of Vila Flor

== See also ==
- Duke of Terceira
- Count of Alpedrinha
- Count of Azarujinha
- List of dukedoms in Portugal
- List of countships in Portugal
