= Life's Vanquished =

Group of Portuguese intellectuals in late 19th century

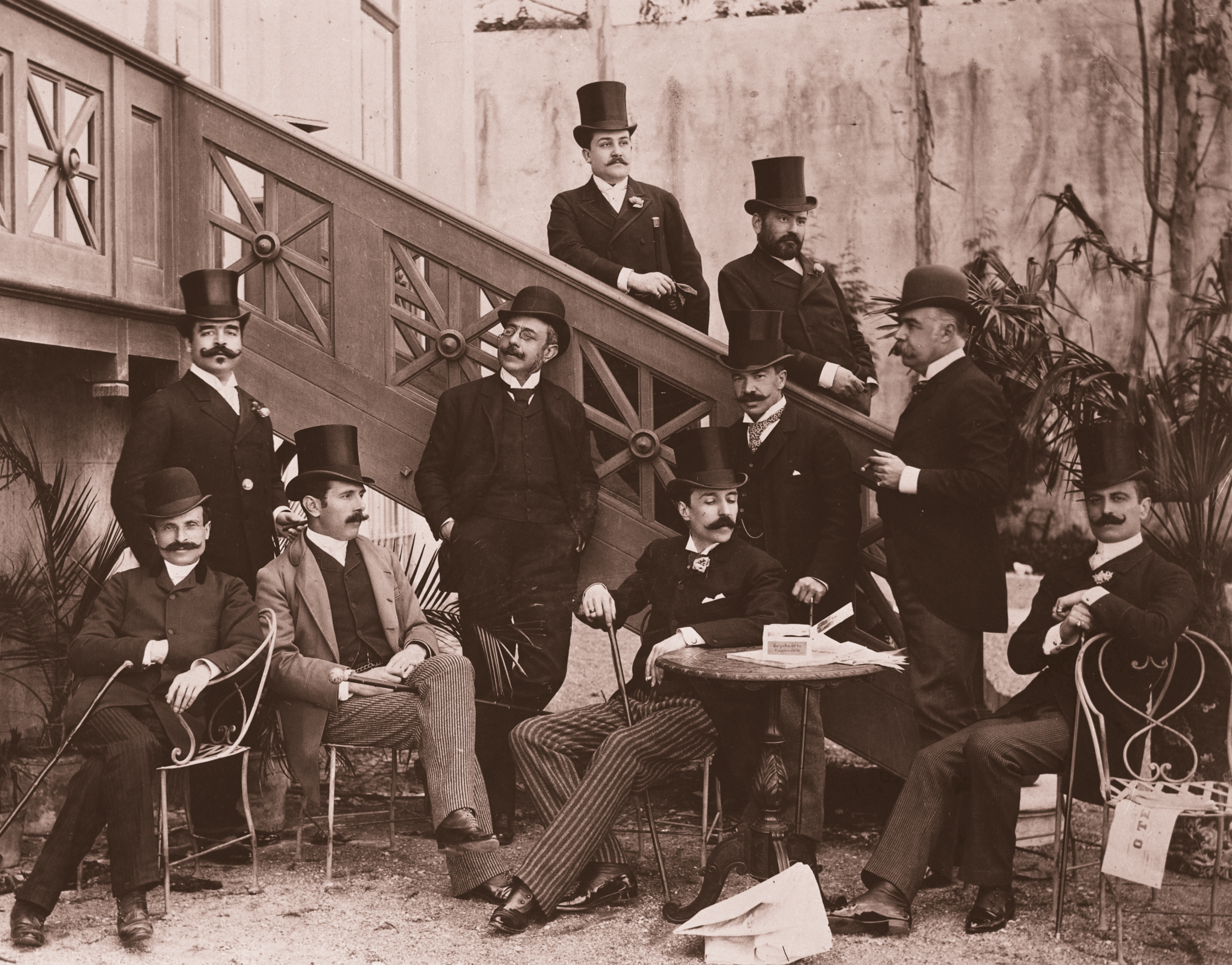
Life's Vanquished, 1888. Left to right: sitting, Guerra Junqueiro, The Count of Sabugosa, José Maria de Eça de Queirós, The Count of Arnoso; standing, The Marquis of Soveral, Ramalho Ortigão, Carlos de Lima Mayer, The Count of Ficalho; on the stairs, Carlos Lobo de Ávila, and Oliveira Martins (António Cândido is missing)

Life's Vanquished (Portuguese: Vencidos da Vida) was an informal group of intellectuals who influenced the culture of Portugal in the last three decades of the 19th century. Among the Vanquished were some of the writers, politicians, and aristocrats that had strived to modernise the country in their youth during the Regeneration — and whose perceived failure had led them to channel their disenchantment into an elegant and ironic decadent dilettantism.

Notable member José Maria de Eça de Queirós explained the perverse name of the group in 1889:

If a fellow walks through existence with the career of hairdresser his supreme ideal in life, that individual is a victor, a great victor, from the moment he holds in his hands a tangled mane and a pair of scissors to shear it with, even though you might find him walking across Chiado looking crestfallen and in ragtag boots. If, on the other hand, a young man of twenty, the age one has to choose a career, decides to become a millionaire, a sublime poet, an undefeated general, a tamer of men (or women, depending on the circumstance) and after the most strenuous effort reaches only halfway toward the vaunted million, poem, or cocked hat, then he is, for all intents and purposes, someone who has been vanquished, a dead man alive, even though you might find him strutting across the Baixa shrouded in a Poole frock coat, the luster of resignation on his top hat.

— Eça de Queirós, O Tempo (29 March 1889)

== See also ==
- History of Portugal (1834–1910)
- Portuguese literature
