= Francisco Manuel de Melo Breyner, 4th Count of Ficalho =

Portuguese botanist (1837–1903)

His Excellency The Count of Ficalho ComNSC
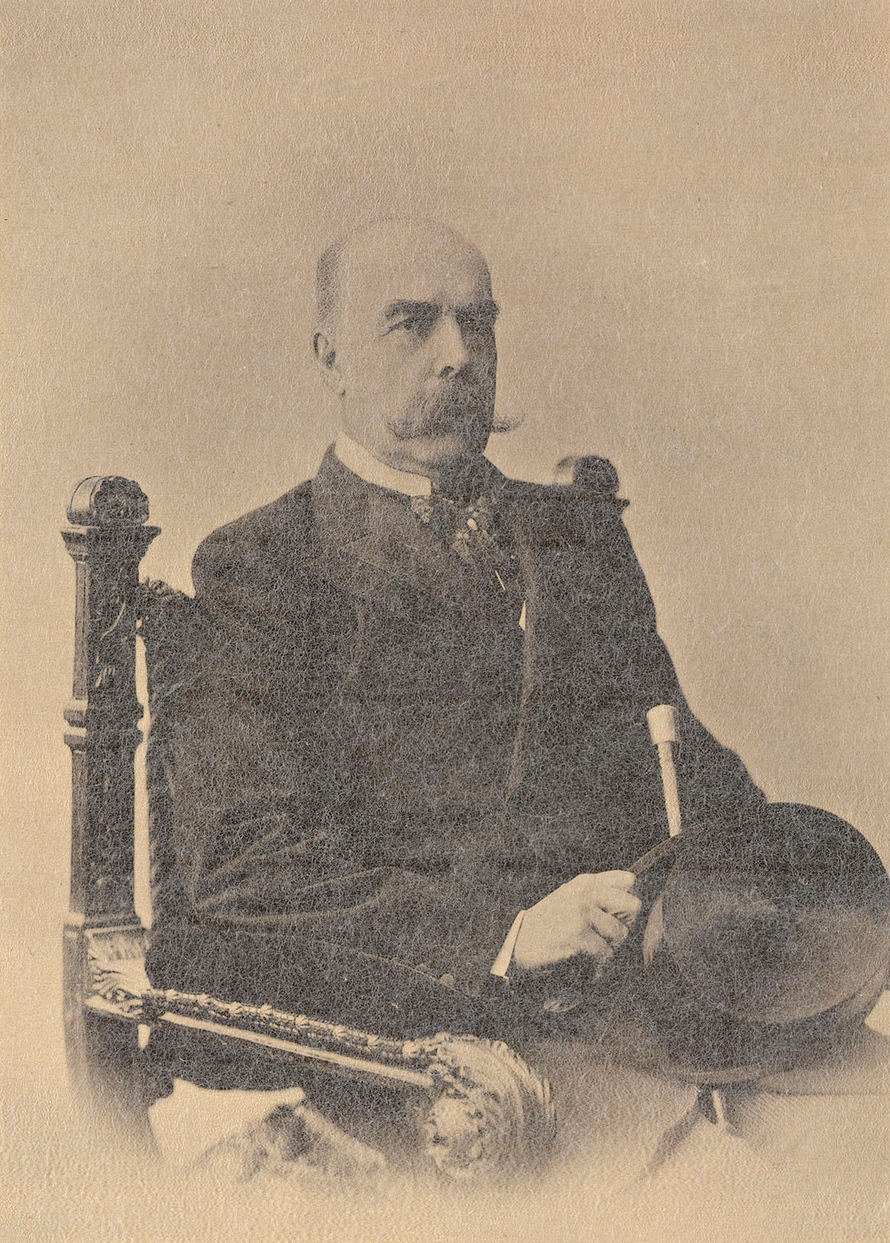

Peer of the Realm
- In office 4 February 1882 – 19 April 1903
- Monarch: Luís I

Civil Governor of the Autonomous District of Funchal
- In office 16 January 1868 – 25 January 1868
- Monarch: Luís I
- Prime Minister: The Count of Ávila
- Preceded by: Jacinto António Perdigão
- Succeeded by: João Frederico da Câmara Leme

Personal details
- Born: 27 July 1837 Santos-o-Velho, Lisbon, Portugal
- Died: 19 April 1903 (aged 65) Mercês, Lisbon, Portugal
- Spouse: Josefa de Meneses Brito do Rio (m. 1862)
- Occupation: Botanist, professor

D. Francisco Manuel de Melo Breyner, 4th Count of Ficalho (27 July 1837 – 19 April 1903), was a Portuguese aristocrat, noted botanist, intellectual and amateur arabist.

== Biography ==
Francisco Manuel de Melo Breyner was the only child of António de Melo Breyner Teles da Silva, 2nd Marquis of Ficalho (1806–1893), and his wife, Maria Luísa Braamcamp de Almeida Castelo Branco. He studied at the Lisbon Polytechnic School from 1855 to 1860, earning brilliant marks; soon after, on 2 January 1864, he became a substitute professor of Botany there; following the death of João de Andrade Corvo in 1890, he became the full professor of the chair.

A member of the Royal Academy of Sciences, he was the founder of the Lisbon Botanical Garden, established in 1878; Ficalho worked closely with German botanist Edmund Goeze, and later the French Jules Daveau in the selection of plants and trees and in the development of the arboretum, and was deeply committed to the scientific transaction with foreign peers. As a botanist and taxonomist, Francisco Manuel de Melo Breyner was especially interested in the study of the African flora, namely the Angolan herbarium of Friedrich Welwitsch.

Intimately acquainted with the History of Portugal, one of his main interests was the Portuguese overseas, namely Portuguese India: he published publishing several important works on the subject, among them Viagens de Pêro da Covilhã (1898) on about the travels of Renaissance explorer Pêro da Covilhã; Garcia de Orta e o Seu Tempo (1886), preparatory work for his two-volume critical edition of Garcia de Orta's Colóquios dos Simples, published in 1891 and 1895; and Plantas Úteis da Africa Portugueza (1884), on the medicinal flora of the African coast. He also wrote Flora dos Lusíadas, published in 1880 to commemorate the tricentennial of the death of Luís de Camões, an account of the plants mentioned in the national epic The Lusiads.

He was made Count of Ficalho by royal decree of King Luís I, on 16 June 1862. The Count of Ficalho was made a member of the Chamber of the Most Worthy Peers of the Realm by royal charter on 29 December 1881; he was formally sworn in on 4 February 1882. The Count of Ficalho was also put in charge of several diplomatic commissions, most notably as Ambassador Extraordinary to the coronation ceremonies of Tsar Nicholas II of Russia in 1896. He was several times considered to head the Ministry of Foreign Affairs, but he never did accept a government post or political party affiliation.

Alongside Ramalho Ortigão, Guerra Junqueiro, Eça de Queirós, and others, the Count of Ficalho was also a member of the "Life's Vanquished", an informal group of the most important personalities of late 19th-century Portuguese intellectual and cultural life.

The Count of Ficalho died in his palace in Rua dos Caetanos, parish of Mercês, around half-past four a.m. on 19 April 1903; King Carlos I went there personally that afternoon to pay his respects. He was interred in the family mausoleum in Prazeres Cemetery the following day.

== Distinctions ==
=== National orders ===
- Commander of the Order of the Immaculate Conception of Vila Viçosa

=== Foreign orders ===
- Grand Cross of the Order of Charles III (Spain)
- Knight of the Order of Leopold (Belgium)
- Knight of the Order of the Netherlands Lion (The Netherlands)
- Knight of the Order of the Red Eagle (Prussia)
- Knight of the Legion of Honour (France)
- Knight of the Order of Saints Maurice and Lazarus (Italy)
- Knight of the Order of Ernest the Pious (Ernestine duchies)
