= List of baronies in Portugal =

Noble titles of Portugal
Dukedoms of Portugal
Marquisates of Portugal
Countships of Portugal
Viscountcies of Portugal
Baronies of Portugal

This is a list of baronies in Portugal:

1. Baron of Água-Izé
2. Baron of Aguiar
3. Baron of Alagoa
4. Baron of Albufeira
5. Baron of Alcantarilha
6. Baron of Alcobaça
7. Baron of Alcochete
8. Baron of Aldenberg
9. Baron of Alenquer
10. Baron of Almargem
11. Baron of Almeda
12. Baron of Almeida
13. Baron of Almeida Santos
14. Baron of Almeidinha
15. Baron of Almeirim
16. Baron of Almofala
17. Baron of Alpendurada
18. Baron of Alquerubim
19. Baron of Alvaiázere
20. Baron of Alverca
21. Baron of Alves da Conceição
22. Baron of Alvito
23. Baron of Alvoco da Serra
24. Baron of Ancede
25. Baron of Andaluz
26. Baron of Anciães
27. Baron of Antas
28. Baron of Aquino
29. Baron of Arcossó
30. Baron of Arede Coelho
31. Baron of Areia Larga
32. Baron of Areias de Cambra
33. Baron of Argamassa
34. Baron of Arruda
35. Baron of Assunção
36. Baron of A-Ver-o-Mar
37. Baron of Balsemão
38. Baron of Bamberg
39. Baron of Barbosa Rodrigues
40. Baron of Barcel
41. Baron of Barcelinhos
42. Baron of Barreto
43. Baron of Barroil
44. Baron of Barry
45. Baron of Basto
46. Baron of Bastos
47. Baron of Beyet de Valmont
48. Baron of Beduíno
49. Baron of Belém
50. Baron of Berger
51. Baron of Bernardo Pinto
52. Baron of Bernheim
53. Baron of Bertelinho
54. Baron of Bliss
55. Baron of Bolhão
56. Baron of Bonfim
57. Baron of Brissos
58. Baron of Burchardt
59. Baron of Burgal
60. Baron of Cabinda
61. Baron of Cabo da Praia
62. Baron of Cacela
63. Baron of Cacilhas
64. Baron of Cadoro
65. Baron of Calapor
66. Baron of Calvário
67. Baron of Camocim
68. Baron of Campanhã
69. Baron of Campolide
70. Baron of Candal
71. Baron of Capelinha
72. Baron of Caria
73. Baron of Casais do Douro
74. Baron of Casal
75. Baron of Casalinho
76. Baron of Castelo
77. Baron of Castelo de Paiva
78. Baron of Castelo Novo
79. Baron of Castro Daire
80. Baron of Castro Silveira
81. Baron of Cercal
82. Baron of Chanceleiros
83. Baron of Claros
84. Baron of Coche de La Ferté
85. Baron of Colaço e Macnamara
86. Baron of Combarjua
87. Baron of Conceição
88. Baron of Condeixa
89. Baron of Corticeira
90. Baron of Corvo
91. Baron of Costa Noronha
92. Baron of Costa Ricci
93. Baron of Costa Veiga
94. Baron of Costeado
95. Baron of Costeira
96. Baron of Cruzeiro
97. Baron of Danvers
98. Baron of Dempó
99. Baron of Dinis Samuel
100. Baron of Duparchy
101. Baron of Eisemann
102. Baron of Erlanger
103. Baron of Ermida
104. Baron of Esposende
105. Baron of Estrela
106. Baron of Estremoz
107. Baron of Eugène Grosos
108. Baron of Ezpeleta
109. Baron of Famalicão
110. Baron of Faria
111. Baron of Faro
112. Baron of Fermil
113. Baron of Ferreira
114. Baron of Ferreira dos Santos
115. Baron of Folgosa
116. Baron of Fonte Bela
117. Baron of Fonte Boa
118. Baron of Fonte do Mato
119. Baron of Fonte Nova
120. Baron of Fornelos
121. Baron of Fornos de Algodres
122. Baron of Forrester
123. Baron of Forster
124. Baron of Foz
125. Baron of Fragosela
126. Baron of Francos
127. Baron of Frantzenstein
128. Baron of Freitas Henriques
129. Baron of Freixo
130. Baron of Gabe de Massarelos
131. Baron of Gáfete
132. Baron of Glória
133. Baron of Goiana
134. Baron of Goldsmith da Palmeira
135. Baron of Gondoriz
136. Baron of Gouvinhas
137. Baron of Gramosa
138. Baron of Granjão
139. Baron of Grimancelos
140. Baron of Guadalupe
141. Baron of Guarda
142. Baron of Hortega
143. Baron of Hospital
144. Baron of Howorth de Sacavém
145. Baron of Ilha Grande de Joanes
146. Baron of Inhaca
147. Baron of Itanhaém
148. Baron of Jardim do Mar
149. Baron of Joane
150. Baron of Jozan
151. Baron of Jugueiros
152. Baron of Junqueira
153. Baron of Kessler
154. Baron of Knowles
155. Baron of Koenigswarter
156. Baron of Lages
157. Baron of Lagoa
158. Baron of Lagos
159. Baron of Laguna
160. Baron of Lamberg
161. Baron of Laranjeiras
162. Baron of Laranjeiras
163. Baron of Lazarim
164. Baron of Le Chin de Barlaimont
165. Baron of Leiria
166. Baron of Linhó
167. Baron of Lobata
168. Baron of Lopez de Torreguay
169. Baron of Lordelo
170. Baron of Louredo
171. Baron of Lourenço Martins
172. Baron of Luso
173. Baron of Löwenstein
174. Baron of Madalena
175. Baron of Magalhães
176. Baron of Magé
177. Baron of Manique do Intendente
178. Baron of Marinho
179. Baron of Massarelos
180. Baron of Mata Bacelar
181. Baron of Matalha
182. Baron of Matosinhos
183. Baron of Matoso
184. Baron of Maurício de Matias
185. Baron of Maxial
186. Baron of Mendonça
187. Baron of Merk
188. Baron of Mesquita
189. Baron of Miranda do Corvo
190. Baron of Mirandela
191. Baron of Mogadouro
192. Baron of Mogofores
193. Baron of Moimenta da Beira
194. Baron of Molelos
195. Baron of Mondim
196. Baron of Monte Brasil
197. Baron of Monte Castedo
198. Baron of Monte Córdova
199. Baron of Monte Pedral
200. Baron of Moreira
201. Baron of Mossâmedes
202. Baron of Nelas
203. Baron of Nevogilde
204. Baron of Nora
205. Baron of Noronha
206. Baron of Nossa Senhora da Luz
207. Baron of Nossa Senhora da Oliveira
208. Baron of Nossa Senhora da Saúde
209. Baron of Nossa Senhora da Vitória na Batalha
210. Baron of Nossa Senhora das Mercês
211. Baron of Nova Sinta
212. Baron of O'Fard de La Grange
213. Baron of Oleiros
214. Baron of Oliveira
215. Baron of Oliveira Castro
216. Baron of Oliveira do Conde
217. Baron of Oliveira Lima
218. Baron of Olocau
219. Baron of Ornelas
220. Baron of Ovar
221. Baron of Paço da Figueira
222. Baron of Paço de Couceiro
223. Baron of Paço de Sousa
224. Baron of Paçô Vieira
225. Baron of Paiva
226. Baron of Paiva Manso
227. Baron of Palença
228. Baron of Palma
229. Baron of Palme
230. Baron of Paranhos
231. Baron of Patterson
232. Baron of Paulo Cordeiro
233. Baron of Paúlos
234. Baron of Peixoto Serra
235. Baron of Perafita
236. Baron of Pereira Bastos
237. Baron of Pereira da Mota
238. Baron of Pereira Gonçalves
239. Baron of Pereira Marinho
240. Baron of Peres da Silva
241. Baron of Perném
242. Baron of Pernes
243. Baron of Perquel
244. Baron of Picard
245. Baron of Pico do Celeiro
246. Baron of Picoas
247. Baron of Pomarão
248. Baron of Pomarinho
249. Baron of Pombalinho
250. Baron of Pombeiro de Riba Vizela
251. Baron of Ponte da Barca
252. Baron of Ponte da Quarteira
253. Baron of Ponte de Marxil
254. Baron of Ponte de Santa Maria
255. Baron of Portela
256. Baron of Porto Covo da Bandeira
257. Baron of Porto de Mós
258. Baron of Póvoa de Santo Adrião
259. Baron of Póvoa de Varzim
260. Baron of Prime
261. Baron of Proença-a-Velha
262. Baron of Provezende
263. Baron of Queluz
264. Baron of Quinta da Costeira
265. Baron of Quinta do Ferro
266. Baron of Quintela
267. Baron of Ramalde
268. Baron of Ramalho
269. Baron of Ramalho
270. Baron of Real Agrado
271. Baron of Reboredo
272. Baron of Recardães
273. Baron of Recosta
274. Baron of Regaleira
275. Baron of Rendufe
276. Baron of Resende
277. Baron of Resgate
278. Baron of Retorta
279. Baron of Riba Tâmega
280. Baron of Ribeira de Pena
281. Baron of Ribeira de Sabrosa
282. Baron of Ribeirinha
283. Baron of Ribeirinho
284. Baron of Ribeiro
285. Baron of Ribeiro Barbosa
286. Baron of Rilvas
287. Baron of Rio Ave
288. Baron of Rio de Moinhos
289. Baron of Rio Seco
290. Baron of Rio Tinto
291. Baron of Rio Torto
292. Baron of Rio Zêzere
293. Baron of Roches
294. Baron of Rodrigues Mendes
295. Baron of Roeda
296. Baron of Rosenthal
297. Baron of Roussado
298. Baron of Ruffer
299. Baron of Ruivoz
300. Baron of Sá da Bandeira
301. Baron of Saavedra
302. Baron of Sabroso
303. Baron of Salgado Zenha
304. Baron of Salgueiro
305. Baron of Salvaterra de Magos
306. Baron of Sameiro
307. Baron of Samões
308. Baron of Samora Correia
309. Baron of Samuel Vahl
310. Baron of Sande
311. Baron of Sandeman
312. Baron of Sanhoane
313. Baron of Santa Ana Nery
314. Baron of Santa Bárbara
315. Baron of Santa Cândida
316. Baron of Santa Comba Dão
317. Baron of Santa Cruz
318. Baron of Santa Engrácia
319. Baron of Santa Leocádia
320. Baron of Santa Quitéria
321. Baron of Santana
322. Baron of Santiago de Lordelo
323. Baron of Santo Amaro
324. Baron of Santo Ambrósio
325. Baron of Santo António
326. Baron of Santos
327. Baron of Santos Abreu
328. Baron of São Clemente
329. Baron of São Cosme
330. Baron of São Dinis
331. Baron of São Domingos
332. Baron of São Francisco
333. Baron of São George
334. Baron of São Geraldo
335. Baron of Sâo Januário
336. Baron of Sâo Jerónimo de Real
337. Baron of São João de Areias
338. Baron of São João de Canelas
339. Baron of São João de Loureiro
340. Baron of São João Marcos
341. Baron of São Joaquim
342. Baron of São Jorge
343. Baron of São José
344. Baron of São José de Porto Alegre
345. Baron of São Lázaro
346. Baron of São Leonardo
347. Baron of São Lourenço
348. Baron of São Marcos
349. Baron of São Martinho de Dume
350. Baron of São Miguel
351. Baron of São Miguel dos Campos
352. Baron of São Nicolau
353. Baron of São Pedro
354. Baron of São Pedro do Rego da Murta
355. Baron of São Raimundo
356. Baron of São Roque
357. Baron of São Salvador de Campos de Goitacazes
358. Baron of São Simão
359. Baron of São Torquato
360. Baron of Sarmento
361. Baron of Schweitzer
362. Baron of Seisal
363. Baron of Seixas
364. Baron of Seixo
365. Baron of Sena Fernandes
366. Baron of Sendal
367. Baron of Sernache
368. Baron of Serra da Estrela
369. Baron of Setúbal
370. Baron of Silva
371. Baron of Silva Gameiro
372. Baron of Silva Nunes
373. Baron of Silveira
374. Barão of Silveiras
375. Baron of Sobral
376. Baron of Socorro
377. Baron of Sousa
378. Baron of Sousa Deiró
379. Baron of Sousa Lajes
380. Baron of Sousa Mesquita
381. Baron of Soutelinho
382. Baron of Soutelo
383. Baron of Souto do Rio
384. Baron of Stern
385. Baron of Stockler
386. Baron of Tavarede
387. Baron of Tavares Leite
388. Baron of Teixeira
389. Baron of Teixoso
390. Baron of Telheiras
391. Baron of Tojal
392. Baron of Tondela
393. Baron of Torre
394. Baron of Torre de Moncorvo
395. Baron of Torre de Pero Palha
396. Baron of Torre de Vila Cova da Lixa
397. Baron of Trovisqueira
398. Baron of Urgueira
399. Baron of Uzel
400. Baron of Valado
401. Baron of Vale
402. Baron of Vale da Mata
403. Baron of Vale da Rica
404. Baron of Vale de Estêvão
405. Baron of Vale Formoso
406. Baron of Valongo
407. Baron of Vargem da Ordem
408. Baron of Várzea do Douro
409. Baron of Vascões
410. Baron of Vasconcelos
411. Baron of Venda da Cruz
412. Baron of Verberckmoes
413. Baron of Viamonte da Boa Vista
414. Baron of Vila Cova
415. Baron of Vila da Praia
416. Baron of Vila Franca da Restauração
417. Baron of Vila Franca de Xira
418. Baron of Vila Gião
419. Baron of Vila Nova da Rainha
420. Baron of Vila Nova de Foz Coa
421. Baron of Vila Nova de Gaia
422. Baron of Vila Nova de Ourém
423. Baron of Vila Nova do Minho
424. Baron of Vila Pouca
425. Baron of Vila Pouca de Aguiar
426. Baron of Vila Seca
427. Baron of Vila Verde
428. Baron of Vilalva Guimarães
429. Baron of Vilar
430. Baron of Vilar Torpim
431. Baron of Vinhais
432. Baron of Wadenstierna
433. Baron of Welten
434. Baron of Wendel
435. Baron of Wildik
436. Baron of Zambujal

== See also ==
- Portuguese nobility
- Dukedoms in Portugal
- List of countships in Portugal
- List of marquisates in Portugal
- List of viscountcies in Portugal
