= Leco (sporting director) =

Brazilian lawyer and sports director

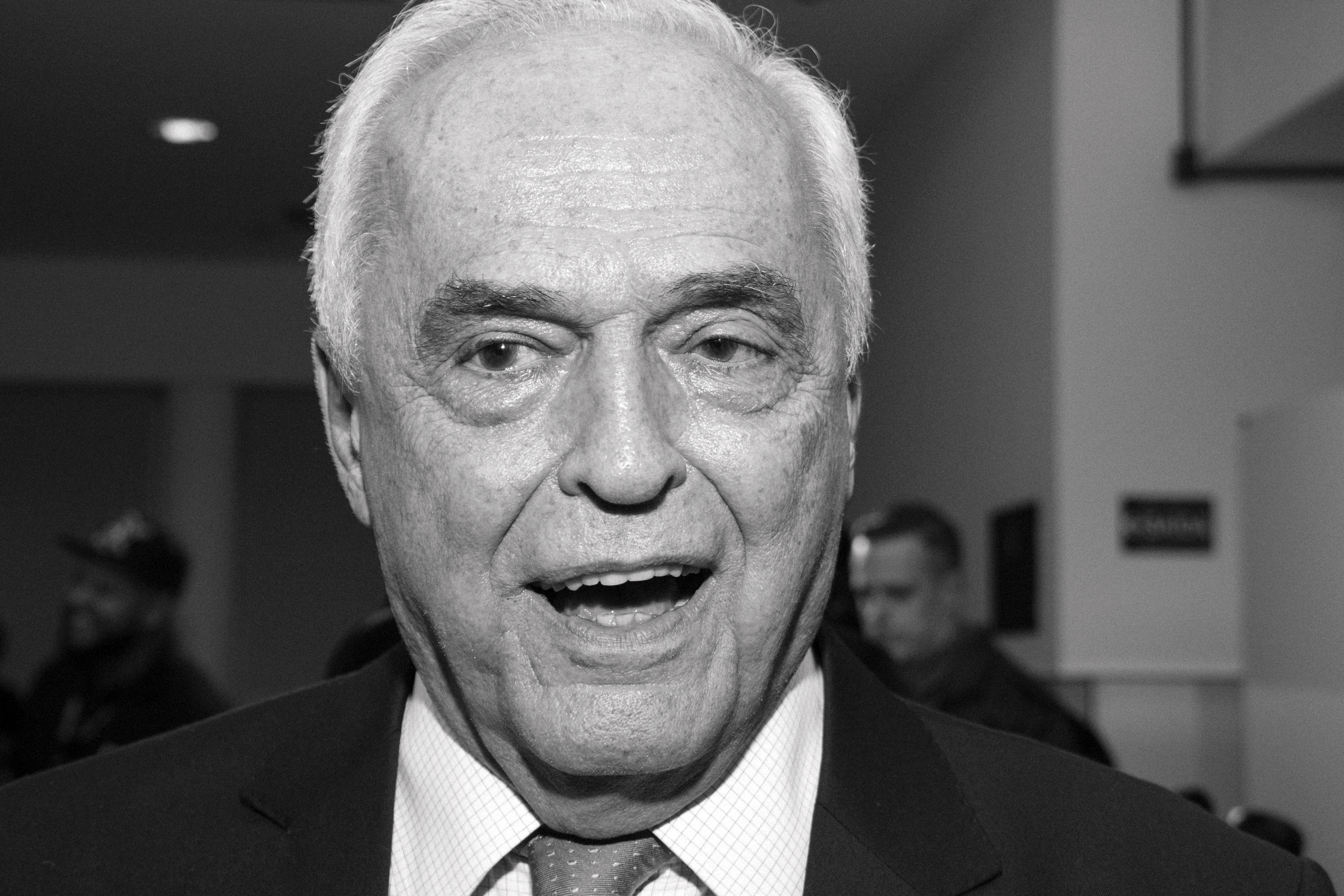
- Leco in 2017
- Born: Carlos Augusto de Barros e Silva; January 13, 1938 (age 88); São Paulo, São Paulo, Brazil
- Other name: Leco
- Occupations: Lawyer, sports administrator
- Known for: 28th president of São Paulo FC
- Term: October 27, 2015 – December 31, 2020 (Note: As president of the Deliberative Council, he assumed the interim presidency from October 13 to 27, 2015, due to the resignation of the incumbent.)
- Predecessor: Carlos Miguel Aidar
- Successor: Julio Casares
- Children: Fernando de Barros e Silva

Carlos Augusto de Barros e Silva (January 13, 1938), also known as Leco, is a Brazilian lawyer and sports executive who served as president of São Paulo FC between 2015 and 2020. He is the father of journalist Fernando de Barros e Silva, contributor to Piauí magazine and host of the Foro de Teresina podcast.

== Biography ==
Carlos Augusto de Barros e Silva was born in Brás, a São Paulo neighborhood of Italian immigrants, in 1938. He graduated in law from Pontifical Catholic University of São Paulo (PUC-SP) in 1963. He is multilingual, speaking English, French, and Spanish in addition to his native language, Portuguese. He worked in law firms in the city of São Paulo and was president of the São Paulo Lawyers Association (AASP).

At São Paulo FC, Leco worked in the club's youth divisions in the 1980s, then became the club's legal director between 1988 and 1990, during Juvenal Juvêncio's first term. In 2000, he ran for president for the first time, losing to Paulo Amaral Vasconcelos by five votes. Two years later, with Marcelo Portugal Gouvêa as president, he became São Paulo's soccer director, a position he held until 2003, being responsible for the much-talked-about signing of Ricardinho. Still in management, during the 2002 Brazilian Championship, he consoled the young player Kaká, who was in tears, at the door of one of the elevators at Morumbi, when the team was eliminated by Santos in the quarterfinals of the Brazilian Championship.

In 2007, during Juvenal Juvêncio's second term, he was appointed vice president of soccer. In April 2014, Leco was elected president of the club's deliberative council. In October 2015, following the resignation of President Carlos Miguel Aidar, who had been elected with the support of former club president Juvenal Juvêncio, Leco was elected. In April 2017, he was re-elected, after receiving 124 votes, against 101 for his opponent, José Eduardo Mesquita Pimenta. Leco is one of the few presidents who did not win any major titles while in charge of the club. Of the thirteen presidents who did not win a title for São Paulo FC, seven resigned. During his tenure, the only title won by the club was the 2017 Florida Cup, an unofficial friendly tournament held in January in the United States.

He remained president of the São Paulo club until December 2020, leaving his successor to be Julio Casares. After leaving office, he joined the club's advisory board, which includes important figures within the institutional policy of São Paulo FC.

== Controversies ==
Leco collected controversies throughout his time in power. Among them, the following stand out:

=== Rogério Ceni case ===
Considered by most fans and the press to be the greatest idol in the history of São Paulo, former goalkeeper Rogério Ceni was dismissed from his position as the club's coach in 2017 and publicly criticized by Leco. On his Facebook account, Ceni quoted a phrase by Ruy Barbosa to refer to the president: "Don't be fooled by white hair, scoundrels also grow old."

=== #Somos18MilhõesForaLeco ===
On November 21, 2019, Leco, who was watching the São Paulo basketball team play against Pinheiros in the Novo Basquete Brasil (NBB) league, was met with protests from a group of fans who were also at the game. During an interview with ESPN Brasil, the president of São Paulo criticized these protests, calling them "orchestrated" by a "small group" of fans who were against his management.

The interview had a negative impact on most of the fans, who responded by creating the hashtag #Somos18MilhõesForaLeco (We are 18 million against Leco) on Twitter (and also its variant, #Somos18MilhõesdeForaLeco), in reference to the number of fans of the club. The hashtag reached the top of the most talked about topics on Twitter in Brazil during the early hours of November 22 and remained there throughout the day.

=== Impeachment request ===
On December 3, 2019, the club's board filed an impeachment request against Leco. In a statement, the president responded: "The request is debatable and misguided, the work of a group of board members motivated by the desire to create false rumors and disrupt the club's environment. The maneuver comes, not coincidentally, on the eve of a decisive match against SC Internacional in the Brasileirão — which should be a moment of unity among São Paulo forces — serving as a window of opportunity for these gentlemen against the management."
