= Baron of Água-Izé =

Barony Água-Izé
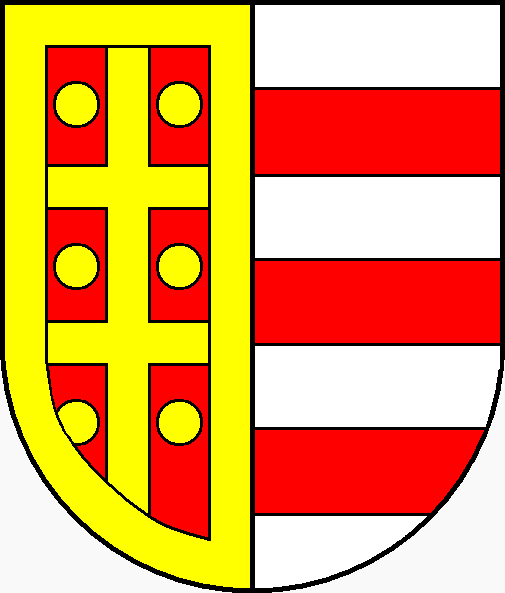
- Coat of arms of the Barons of Água-Izé
- Creation date: 16 April 1868
- Created by: Luís I of Portugal
- First holder: João de Sousa de Almeida, 1st Baron of Água-Izé
- Last holder: Manuel Cruz de Almeida, 2nd Baron of Água-Izé
- Status: Extinct
- Extinction date: 17 July 1889

Baron of Água-Izé is a noble title created by King Luís I of Portugal, by decree of 16 April and Royal Charter of 18 May 1868, in favour of João Maria de Sousa de Almeida, a wealthy landowner in São Tomé and Príncipe.

Without legitimate issue from the marriage to Mariana António de Carvalho, the title passed to a legitimised son of the 1st Baron. The decree of legitimation is dated 12 May 1869. The title was renewed by decree of King Luís I on 28 December 1871.

== Barons of Água-Izé (1868) ==
| # | Name | Dates | Spouse | Notes |
|---|---|---|---|---|
| 1 | João Maria de Sousa de Almeida | 1816 - 1869 | Mariana António de Carvalho | 1st Baron of Água-Izé. |
| 2 | Manuel da Vera Cruz de Almeida | ? | ? | Legitimised son of the 1st Baron. 2nd Baron of Água-Izé. |

== Coat of arms ==
The coat of arms combines the heraldic bearings of the Almeida and Leitão families.

Coat of arms of Baron of Água-Izé
| Shield The shield is parted per pale (vertically divided) Dexter side—Arms of the House of Almeida Gules, six bezants arranged around a double cross or gold, within a bordure of the same metal, with a green brisure charged with a silver arrowhead, indicating a cadet branch Sinister side—Arms of the House of Leitão Argent, three fesses gules (red horizontal bands) Symbolism Combined arms of the Almeida and Leitão families |

== See also ==
- List of baronies in Portugal
