= Nathalia Urban =

Brazilian journalist and migrant rights activist (1987–2024)

- Born: 24 December 1987; Santos, São Paulo, Brazil
- Died: 27 September 2024 (aged 36); Edinburgh, Scotland
- Body discovered: South Queensferry, Scotland
- Occupations: Journalist, campaigner and activist
- Known for: Human rights activist

Nathalia Urban (25 December 1987 – 27 September 2024) was a Brazilian journalist, activist and human rights campaigner.

== Early life and education ==
Urban was born in Santos, São Paulo, Brazil. She was the daughter of a single mother and grew up in João Pessoa, Paraíba. She would go on to study women's rights and social movements in Latin America, themes that would later inspire her journalistic work. Urban pursued studies in anthropology, social sciences and journalism at Federal University of Paraíba, PUC São Paulo, and the Catholic University of Santos.

== Career ==
=== Journalism ===
Urban moved to the United Kingdom in 2013 and was a presenter on the Brasil 247 online news channel. She was a regular presenter on programmes including Opera Mundi and Revista Fórum, focusing on Latin American politics and international politics. Urban's written work featured in outlets including Brasil Wire, Brasil 247, and Jacobin.

As a journalist, she interviewed Brazilian president Lula da Silva and minister Celso Amorim.

=== Activism ===
Urban moved to Scotland in 2014. While living in Scotland, she remained committed to political developments in her native country, speaking out against the presidency of Jair Bolsonaro and deforestation in the Amazon. In Scotland, she co-founded The Resist Brazil Scotland, a political group of Brazilian women dedicated to improving conditions in Brazil, and raising awareness of Latin Americans in Scotland.

Her experience as a migrant in the United Kingdom further encouraged her commitment to advocate for marginalized groups. She described an experience while working in a beauty salon when a client made fun of her accent. When defended by another client, she was encouraged to continue her life in the country. She was a founding trustee of Migrant Women Press (MWP), which trained migrant women to become journalists and writers. In 2023, she became a board member of MWP. Urban also worked for National Ugly Mugs (NUM), a charity advocating for safety and human rights for sex workers. At NUM, she launched a wellbeing centre in Scotland and established a framework of support services for sex workers in the country.

In Scotland, Urban advocated for Scottish independence, participating in Yes campaigns including All Under One Banner. She served as a member of the Scottish National Party's Black, Asian and Minority Ethnic (BAME) network.

== Death ==
On 23 September 2024, Urban was scheduled to speak in Liverpool, England, at an event for a conference hosted by the Labour Party. When she didn't attend, concerns were raised about her safety after she posted concerning messages on her X account. She additionally did not return to work at Brasil 247, despite being scheduled to do so.

At 18:10 on 23 September, Urban was found after falling from the Forth Road bridge. She was still alive and rushed to Edinburgh's Royal Infirmary. On 27 September, Urban's life support was turned off after she was found to have irreparable brain damage. Her organs were later donated.

After Urban's death, Brazilian president Lula da Silva called on Police Scotland to investigate the circumstances surrounding her death. Jeremy Corbyn, former UK-Labour party leader, similarly called for an inquiry.

"Nathalia was a fearless journalist. Her passing is a tragedy and saddens me greatly. I echo the call from President Lula for clarity."

Police Scotland later indicated they were investigating evidence of domestic violence in relation to Urban's death.
