= Baron of Koenigswarter =

Noble title

Barony Koenigswarter
- Creation date: 27 November 1867
- Created by: Luís I of Portugal
- First holder: Maximilian Julius Koenigswarter, 1st Baron of Koenigswarter
- Status: Extinct

Baron of Koenigswarter was a noble title created by King Luís I of Portugal, by Decree of 27 November and Royal Charter of 7 December 1867, in favour of Maximilian Julius Koenigswarter.

== Barons of Koenigswarter (1867) ==
#	Name	Notes
1	Maximilian Julius Koenigswarter	1st Baron of Koenigswarter

== Notes ==
- This article was initially translated, in whole or in part, from the Portuguese Wikipedia article titled “Barão de Koenigswarter”.
