= Baron of Miranda do Corvo =

Noble title

Barony Miranda do Corvo
- Creation date: 21 August 1840
- Created by: Maria II of Portugal
- First holder: Joaquim Vitorino da Silva, 1st Baron of Miranda do Corvo
- Status: Extinct

Baron of Miranda do Corvo was a noble title created by Queen Maria II of Portugal, by decree of 21 August 1840, in favour of Joaquim Vitorino da Silva.

== Barons of Miranda do Corvo (1840) ==
#	Name	Notes
1	Joaquim Vitorino da Silva	1st Baron of Miranda do Corvo

== Notes ==
- This article was initially translated, in whole or in part, from the Portuguese Wikipedia article titled “Barão de Miranda do Corvo”.
