= Baron of Fonte Bela =

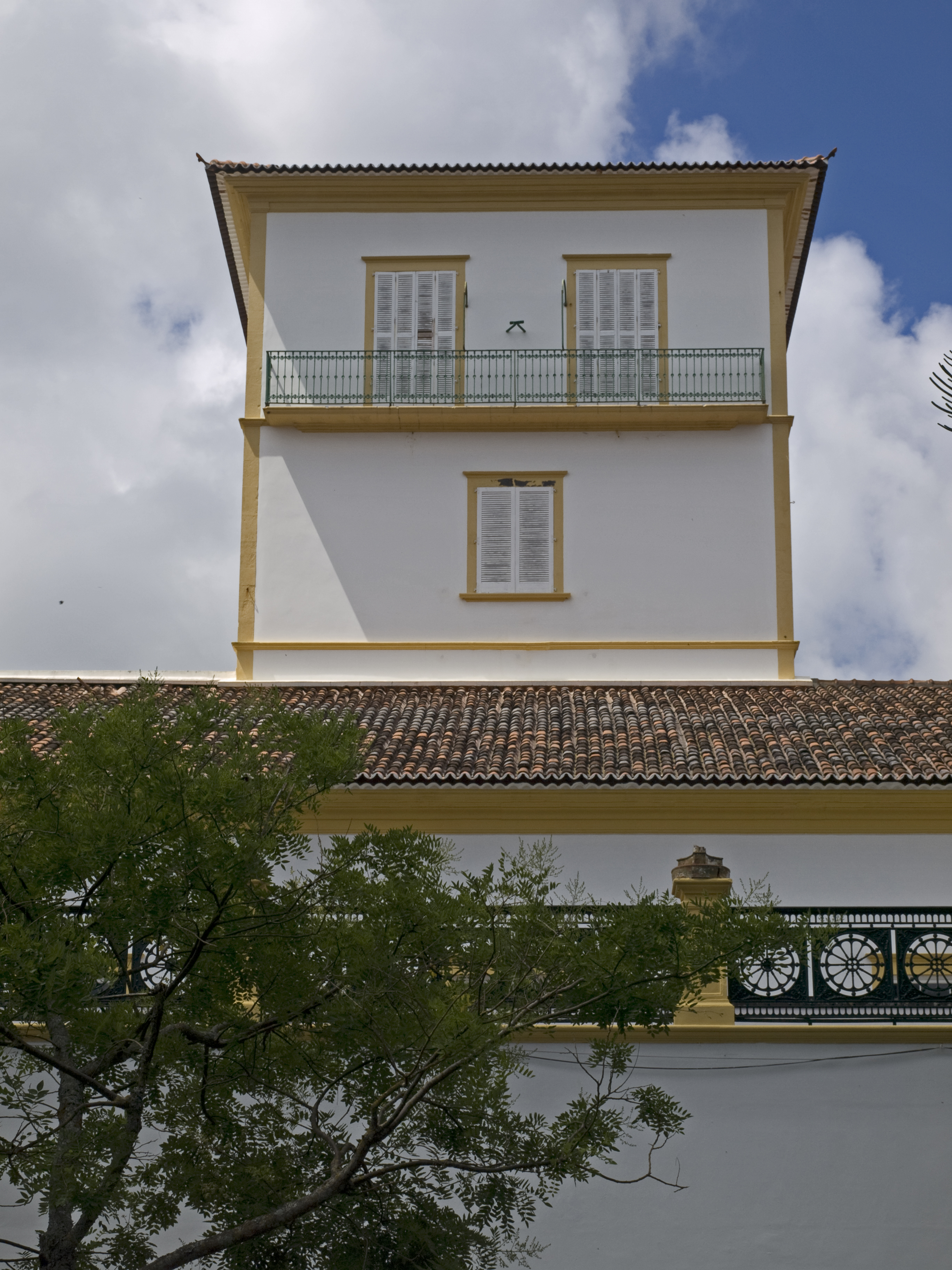
Fonte Bela Palace in Ponta Delgada

The Baron of Fonte Bela (Portuguese: Barão da Fonte Bela) was a title created by decree on 3 March 1836, confirmed by letter on 12 March 1836, by Queen Maria II, in favour of Jacinto Inácio Rodrigues da Silveira, a rich merchant and liberal politician from Ponta Delgada, in the Portuguese archipelago of the Azores.

== List of barons ==
1. Jacinto Inácio Rodrigues da Silveira, 1st Baron of Fonte Bela;
2. Amâncio Gago da Câmara, 2nd Baron and 1st Count of Fonte Bela;
3. Jacinto da Silveira Gago da Câmara, 2nd Count of Fonte Bela;
4. Jacinto Inácio da Silveira de Andrade Albuquerque Gago da Câmara, 3rd Count of Fonte Bela.

After the installation of the Portuguese Republic, the monarchy was abolished, resulting in the transformation of Estevão Gago da Câmara, into pretender to this title.
