= Baron of Massarelos =

Noble title

Barony Massarelos
- Creation date: 21 May 1847
- Created by: Maria II of Portugal
- First holder: Joaquim Augusto Kopke Schwerin de Sousa, 1st Baron of Massarelos
- Status: Extinct

Baron of Massarelos was a noble title created by Queen Maria II of Portugal, by decree of 21 May 1847, in favour of Joaquim Augusto Kopke Schwerin de Sousa.

== Barons of Massarelos (1847) ==
#	Name	Notes
1	Joaquim Augusto Kopke Schwerin de Sousa	1st Baron of Massarelos

== Coat of arms ==
A shield with a blue field, featuring three silver crescents arranged in a triangle and a star of the same metal in the centre.

== Notes ==
- This article was initially translated, in whole or in part, from the Portuguese Wikipedia article titled “Barão de Massarelos”.
