= Baron of Linhó =

Noble title

Barony Linhó
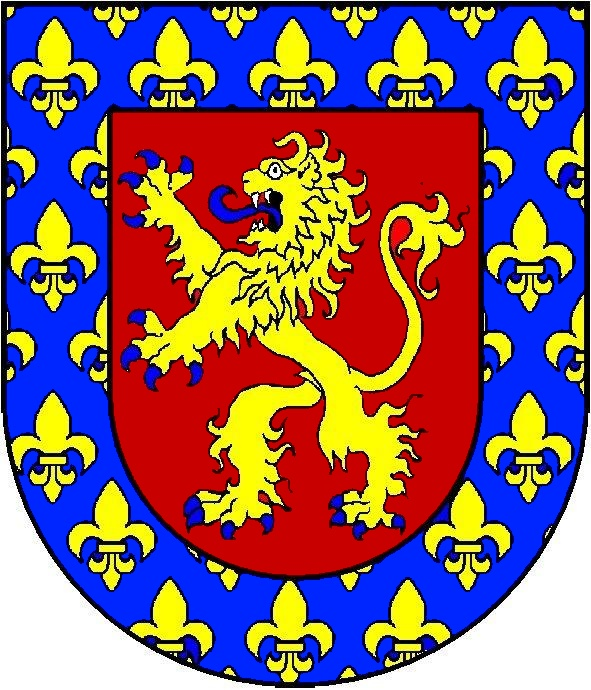
- Creation date: 4 February 1910
- Created by: Manuel II of Portugal
- First holder: António Sousa Dias da Câmara, 1st Baron of Linhó
- Status: Extinct

Baron of Linhó was a noble title created by King Manuel II of Portugal, by decree of 4 February 1910, in favour of António Borges Coutinho de Medeiros de Sousa Dias da Câmara.

== Barons of Linhó (1910) ==
#	Name	Dates	Notes
1	António Borges Coutinho de Medeiros de Sousa Dias da Câmara	1871–1941	1st Baron of Linhó

== Coat of arms ==
A shield bearing the arms of the Borges family.

== Notes ==
- This article was initially translated, in whole or in part, from the Portuguese Wikipedia article titled “Barão do Linhó".
