= Baron of Monte Córdova =

Noble title

Barony Monte Córdova
- Creation date: 22 September 1887
- Created by: Luís I of Portugal
- First holder: José António Martins, 1st Baron of Monte Córdova
- Status: Extinct

Baron of Monte Córdova was a noble title created by King Luís I of Portugal, by decree of 22 September 1887, in favour of José António Martins.

== Barons of Monte Córdova (1887) ==
#	Name	Notes
1	José António Martins	1st Baron of Monte Córdova

== Notes ==
- This article was initially translated, in whole or in part, from the Portuguese Wikipedia article titled “Barão de Monte Córdova”.
