= Baron of Alcantarilha =

Barony Alcantarilha
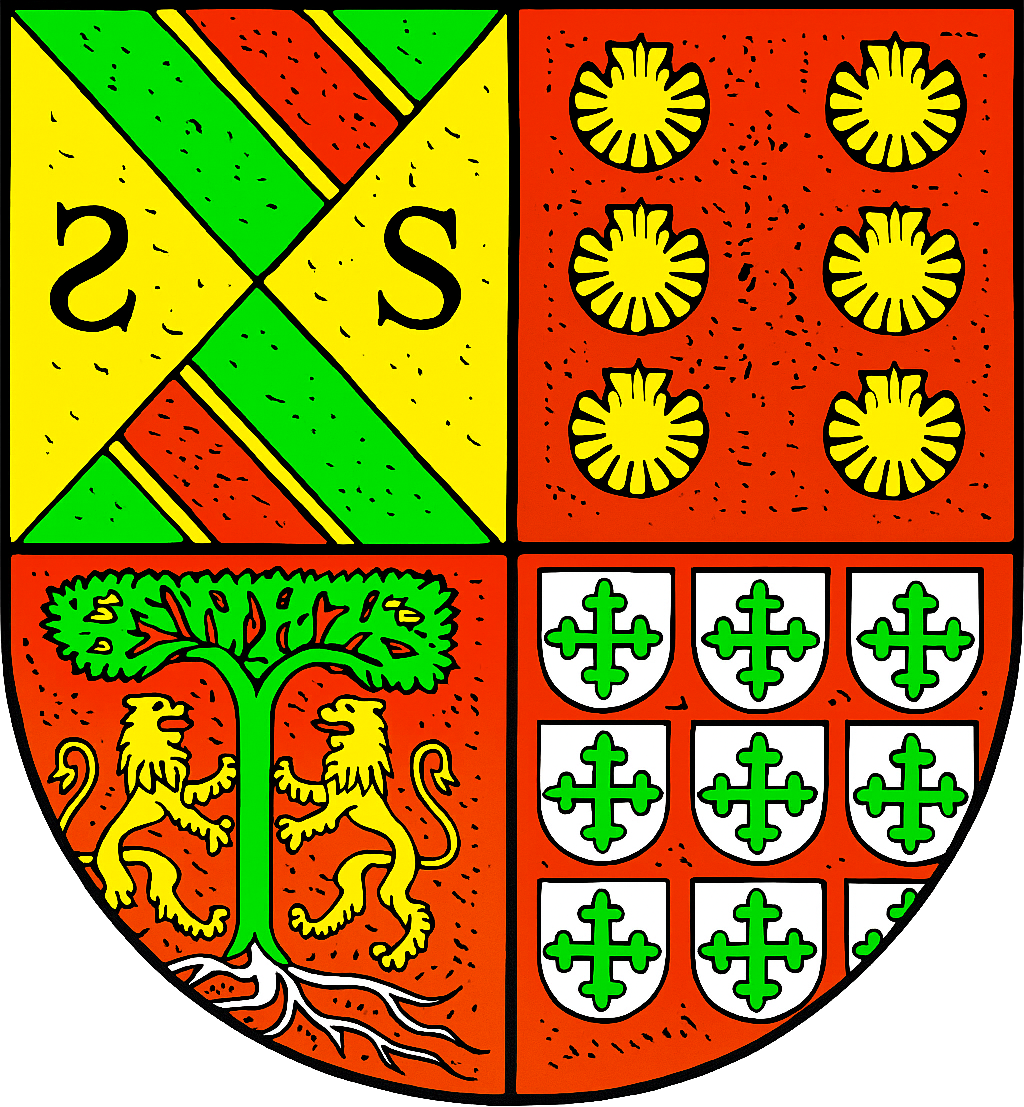
- Coat of Arms of the Baron of Alcantarilha
- Creation date: 17 June 1869
- Created by: Luís I of Portugal
- First holder: Sebastião José de Mendonça, 1st Baron of Alcantarilha
- Status: Extinct

Baron of Alcantarilha was a noble title instituted by His Majesty King Luís I of Portugal, by decree dated 17 June 1869, in favour of Sebastião José de Mendonça.

== Baron of Alcantarilha (1869) ==
| # | Name | Notes |
|---|---|---|
| 1 | Sebastião José de Mendonça | 1st Baron of Alcantarilha |

== Coat of arms ==
Use of the coat of arms granted in Brazil to his brother, the Baron of Jaraguá, by Royal Charter dated 22 August 1861.

The coat of arms is described as follows:

A quartered shield: in the first quarter, the arms of the Mendonça family, which are: a French-style shield—first, on a green field, a red bend cotised in gold; second, a black letter "S" on a gold field, and vice versa in the opposite quarters; in the second quarter, the arms of the Vieira family—on a red field, six gold scallop shells arranged in two vertical rows (pales); in the third quarter, the arms of the Mattos family—on a red field, a green pine tree bearing fruit, with gold outlines and roots, between two gold lions, armed in blue; in the fourth quarter, the arms of the Moreira family—on a red field, nine silver escutcheons, each bearing a green flory cross like those of the Order of Aviz, arranged in three pales.

Crest – a golden wing bearing a black letter "S" as in the shield, with a silver label charged with a black "S" as a mark of cadency.

== Notes ==
- This article was initially translated, in whole or in part, from the Portuguese Wikipedia article titled “Barão de Alcantarilha”.
