= Baron of Almofala =

Noble title of the Kingdom of Portugal

Barony Almofala
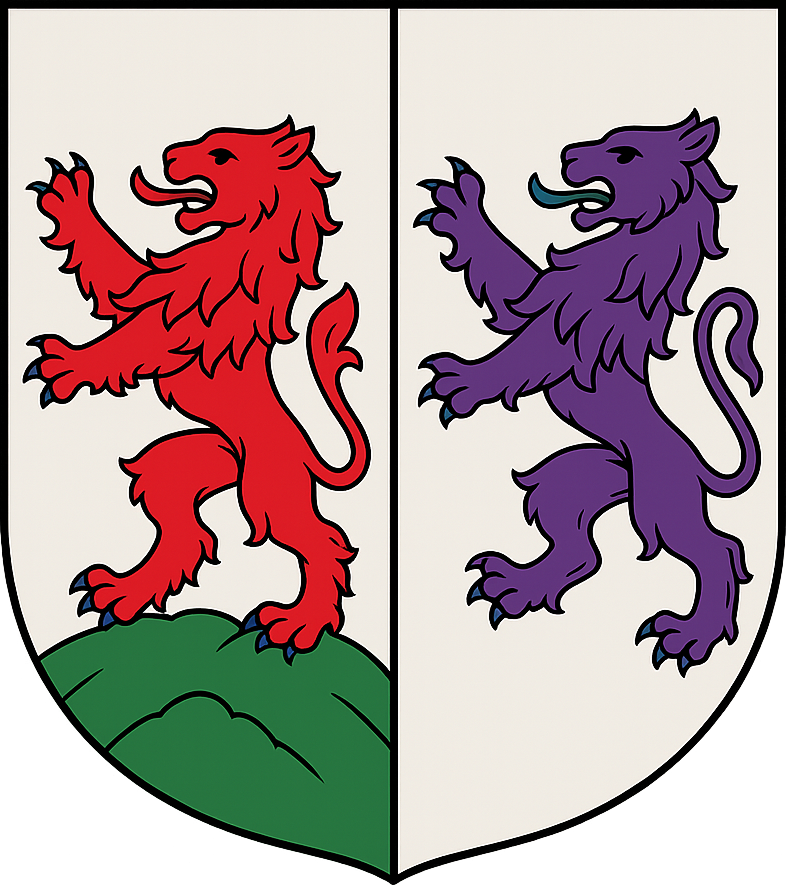
- Coat of Arms of the Baron of Almofala
- Creation date: 20 January 1847
- Created by: Maria II of Portugal
- First holder: António José da Silva Leão, 1st Baron of Almofala
- Last holder: Eduardo Correia de Leão, 2nd Baron of Almofala
- Status: Extinct

Baron of Almofala was a noble title created by Queen Maria II of Portugal, by a decree on 20 January 1847, and confirmed by Royal charter on 3 May 1847. The first holder of the title was General António José da Silva Leão, 1st Baron of Almofala.

== Barons of Almofala (1874) ==
#	Name	Notes
1	António José da Silva Leão	1st Baron of Almofala
2	Eduardo Augusto Possolo Correia de Leão	2nd Baron of Almofala

== Coat of arms ==
The coat of arms is a shield divided in two; the left side has a red lion on a hill, and the right side has a purple lion.

== See also ==
- List of baronies in Portugal
