= Baron of Lordelo =

Noble title

Barony Lordelo
- Creation date: 20 December 1836
- Created by: Maria II of Portugal
- First holder: José da Fonseca e Gouveia, 1st Baron of Lordelo
- Status: Extinct

Baron of Lordelo was a noble title created by Queen Maria II of Portugal, by decree of 20 December 1836, in favour of José da Fonseca e Gouveia, formerly 1st Baron of Vilar.

== Barons of Lordelo (1836) ==
#	Name	Notes
1	José da Fonseca e Gouveia	1st Baron of Vilar and 1st Baron of Lordelo

== Notes ==
- This article was initially translated, in whole or in part, from the Portuguese Wikipedia article titled “Barão de Lordelo”.
