= Baron of Joane =

Noble title

Barony Joane
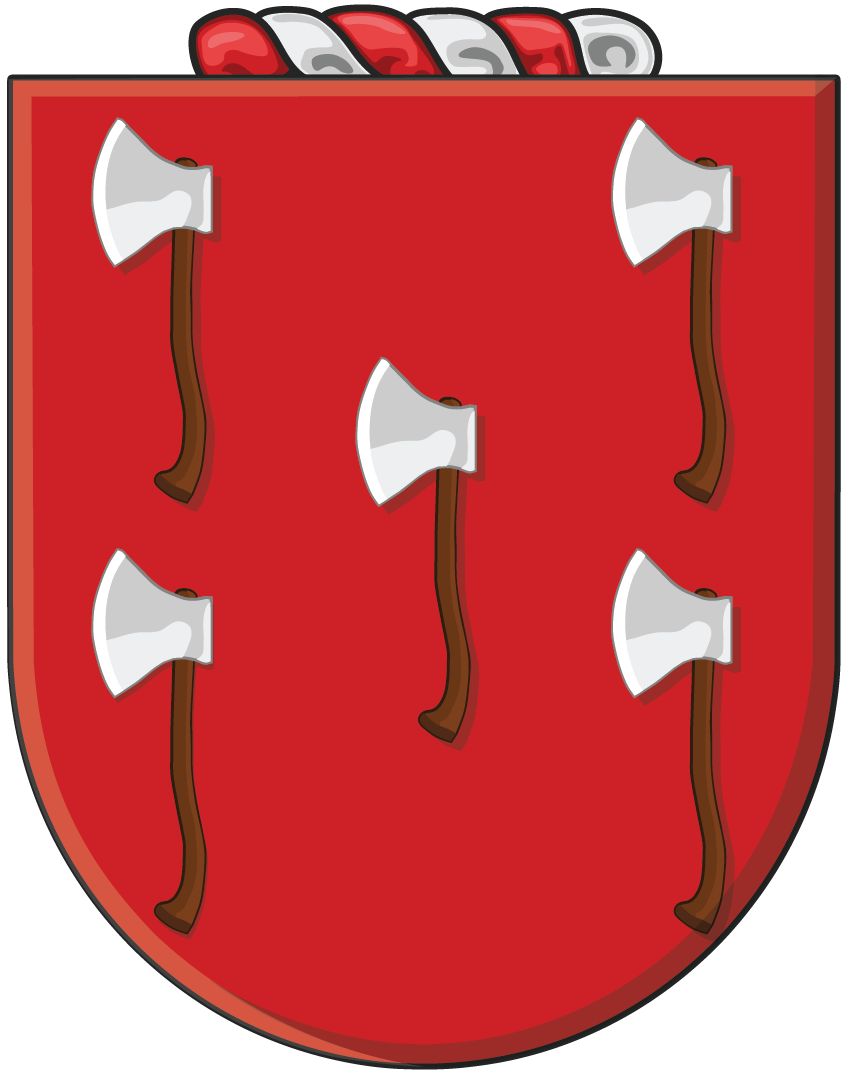
- Creation date: 16 July 1870
- Created by: Luís I of Portugal
- First holder: António Luís Machado Guimarães, 1st Baron of Joane
- Status: Extinct

Baron of Joane was a noble title created by King Luís I of Portugal, by Decree of 11 and Royal Charter of 16 July 1870, in favour of António Luís Machado Guimarães.

== Barons of Joane (1870) ==
#	Name	Notes
1	António Luís Machado Guimarães	1st Baron of Joane Father of Bernardino Machado (3rd and 8th President of Portugal)

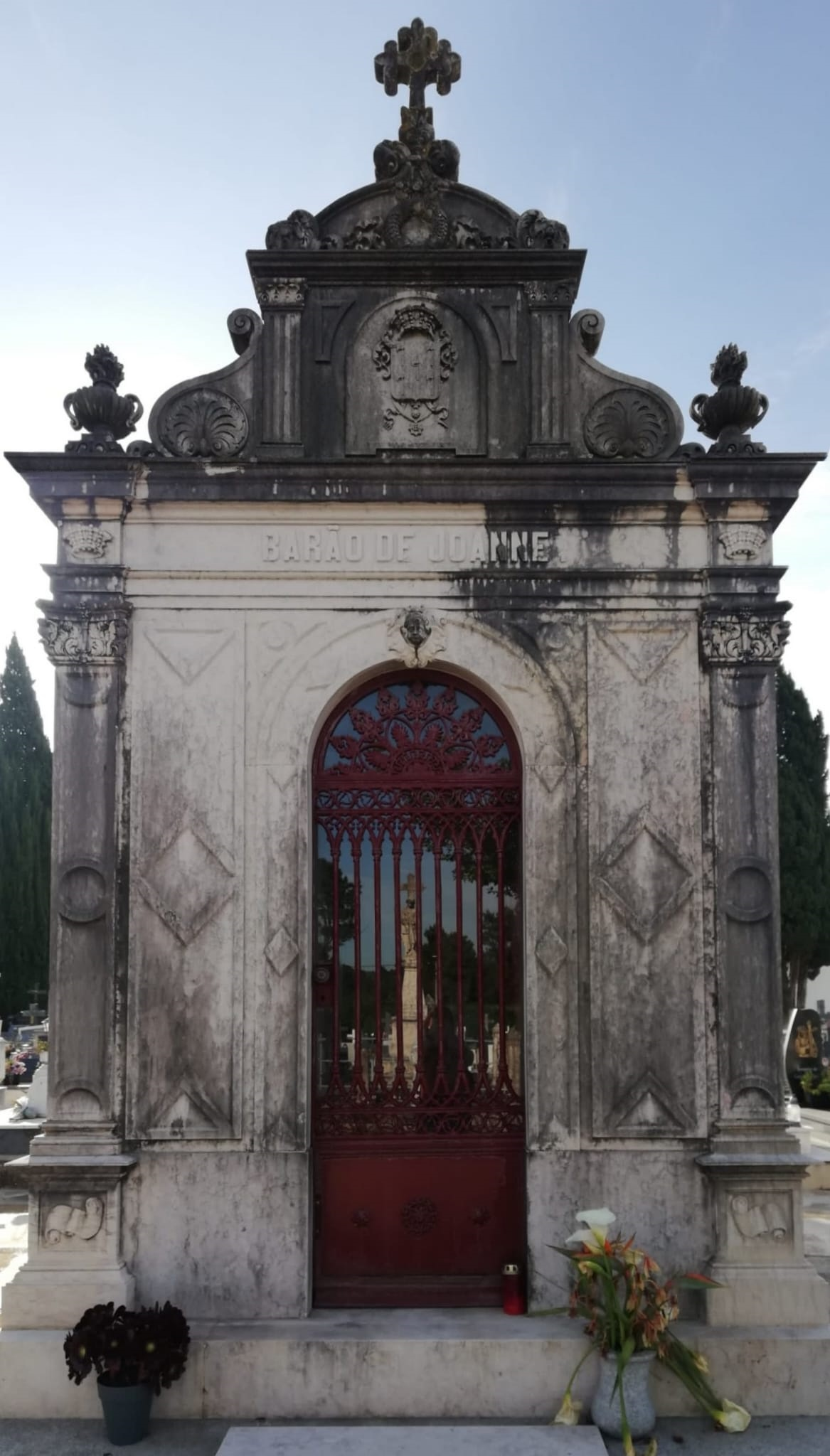
The mausoleum of the Baron of Joane, where his son, Bernardino Machado (3rd and 8th President of the First Portuguese Republic), and his family are buried, in the Municipal Cemetery of Vila Nova de Famalicão.

== Coat of arms ==
A shield bearing the arms of the Machado family.

== Notes ==
- This article was initially translated, in whole or in part, from the Portuguese Wikipedia article titled “Barão de Joane”.
