= Viscount of Santana =

Viscountship Santana
- Creation date: 16 August 1870
- Created by: Luís I of Portugal
- First holder: Manuel Alves Guerra, 1st Viscount of Santana
- Last holder: Manuel de Melsbroeck Alves Guerra, 3rd Viscount of Santana
- Extinction date: 1910 (Monarchy abolished)
- Former seats: Palacete de Santana, Horta

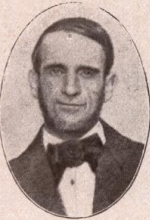
Manuel Alves Guerra, 1st Viscount of Santana (1814–1895)

Viscount of Santana is a noble title created by decree of 16 August 1870, by King Luís I of Portugal, in favour of Manuel Alves Guerra, who was already 1st Baron of Santana, a title previously granted by decree of 20 July 1863.

== History ==
The designation of the title derives from the Palacete de Santana, a large property located in the upper part of the city of Horta, then owned by the 1st Baron. The building is currently owned by the Santa Casa da Misericórdia da Horta and presently houses the Escola Profissional da Horta.

The title of Baron of Santana was thus the direct precursor of the Viscountcy, having also been granted, by decree of 10 February 1870, to the nephew of the 1st Baron and 1st Viscount, likewise named Manuel Alves Guerra, a diplomat and politician. He would later succeed as the 2nd Viscount.

== Barons of Santana (1863) ==
#	Name	Dates	Title	Notes
1	Manuel Alves Guerra	1815–1895	1st Baron of Santana	Later 1st Viscount of Santana
2	Rodrigo Alves Guerra	1833–1901	2nd Baron of Santana	Paternal nephew of the former; Brother of the 2nd Viscount of Santana

== Viscounts of Santana (1870) ==
#	Name	Dates	Title	Notes
1	Manuel Alves Guerra	1815–1895	1st Viscount of Santana	Previously 1st Baron of Santana
2	Manuel Alves Guerra	1834–1910	2nd Viscount of Santana	Paternal nephew of the former (son of Rodrigo Alves Guerra, brother of the 1st Viscount of Santana); Brother of the 2nd Baron of Santana
3	Manuel de Melsbroeck Alves Guerra	1864–1946	3rd Viscount of Santana	Son of the former

== Notes ==
- This article was originally translated, in whole or in part, from the Portuguese Wikipedia article titled "Visconde de Santana".
