= Baron of Howorth de Sacavém =

Noble title

Barony Howorth de Sacavém
- Creation date: 16 July 1885
- Created by: Luís I of Portugal
- First holder: John Stott Howorth, 1st Baron of Howorth de Sacavém
- Status: Extinct

Baron of Howorth de Sacavém, sometimes simplified to Baron of Sacavém, was a noble title created by King Luís I of Portugal, by decree of 16 July 1885, in favour of John Stott Howorth.

== Barons of Howorth de Sacavém (1885) ==
#	Name	Notes
1	John Stott Howorth	1st Baron of Howorth de Sacavém

== Notes ==
- This article was initially translated, in whole or in part, from the Portuguese Wikipedia article titled “Barão de Howorth de Sacavém”.
