= Baron of Albufeira =

Noble title in the Kingdom of Portugal

Barony Albufeira
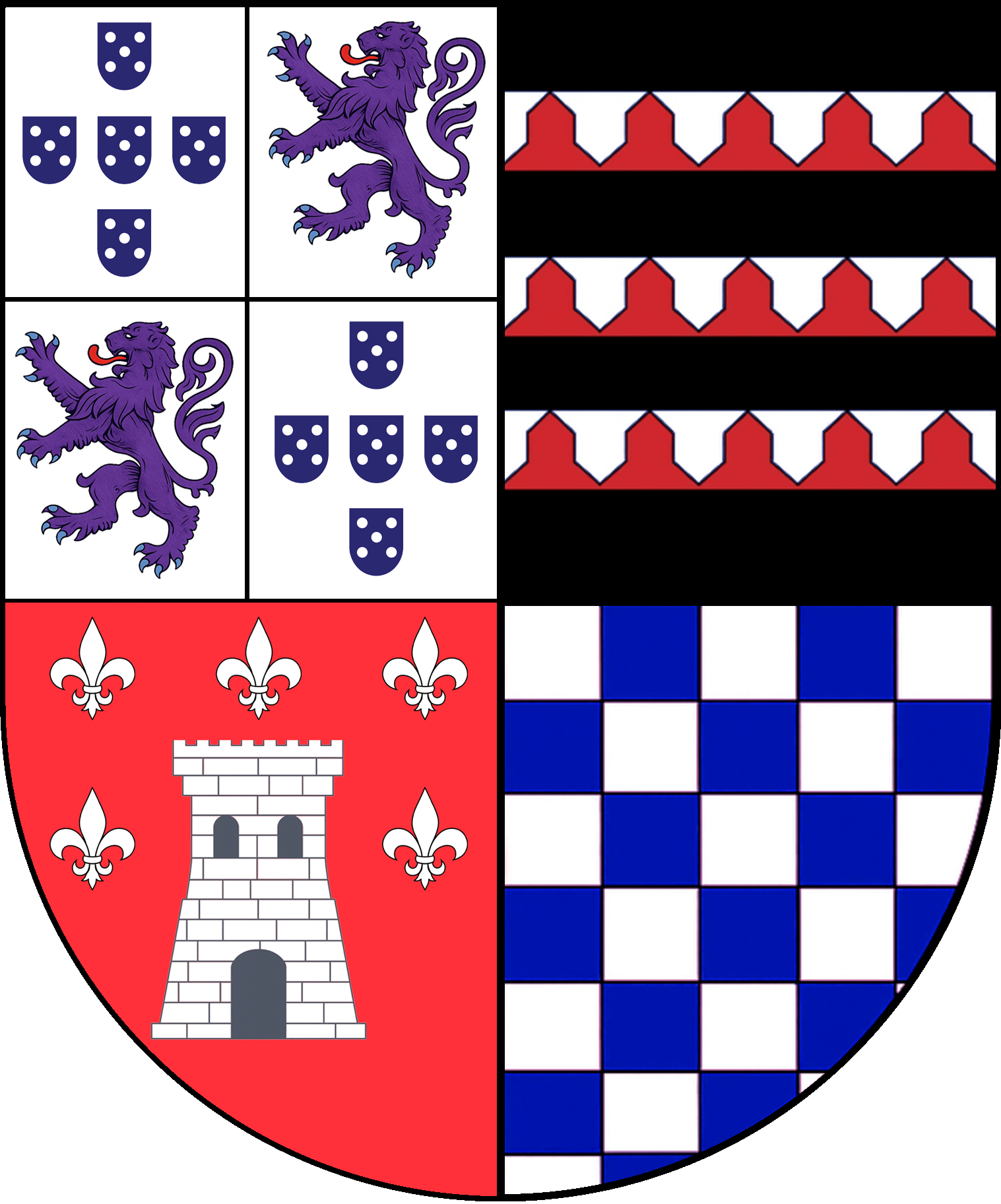
- Creation date: 26 October 1823
- Created by: João VI of Portugal
- First holder: José de Vasconcelos e Sá, 1st Baron of Albufeira
- Last holder: Henrique Manuel Salvador de Vasconcelos e Sá, 3rd Baron of Albufeira
- Status: Extinct

Baron of Albufeira was a noble title created by King João VI of Portugal, by decree of 26 October 1823 and by Royal Charter of 24 February 1824, in favour of José de Vasconcelos e Sá, Lieutenant-General of the Portuguese Army and a Deputy. The title was granted as a reward for deeds achieved during the Peninsular War (French invasions).

== Barons of Albufeira (1823) ==
#	Name	Notes
1	José de Vasconcelos e Sá	1st Baron of Albufeira
2	José Maria de Vasconcelos e Sá	2nd Baron of Albufeira
3	Henrique Manuel Salvador de Vasconcelos e Sá	3rd Baron of Albufeira

== Coat of arms ==
A quartered shield; in the first quarter, the arms of the Sousas do Prado — a quartered field: in the first quarter, the five escutcheons of the Kingdom, without the border of castles; in the second quarter, on a silver field, a sanguine lion — in the second quarter, the arms of the Vasconcelos — on a black field, three bars counter-compony of silver and red, the silver on top, the red below; in the third quarter, the arms of the Farias — on a red field, a silver castle, with black doors and windows, between two silver fleurs-de-lis, and three in chief; in the fourth quarter, the arms of the Sás — a field chequered silver and blue, six pieces in fess and seven in pale.

== Notes ==
- This article was initially translated, in whole or in part, from the Portuguese Wikipedia article titled “Barão de Albufeira”.
