= Foro de Teresina =

Podcast about Brazilian politics

- Genre: Brazilian politics
- Country of origin: Brazil
- Language: Portuguese

Cast and voices
- Hosted by: Fernando de Barros e Silva; Ana Clara Costa; Celso Rocha de Barros

Production
- Production: Rádio Novelo; Piauí
- Length: approx. 55 minutes

Publication
- No. of episodes: 507 (March 2026)
- Original release: 14 May 2018 – 3 November 2023; 15 March 2024
- Provider: Piauí
- Updates: Weekly

Related
- Website: piaui.folha.uol.com.br/radio-piaui/foro-de-teresina/

Foro de Teresina is a Brazilian podcast launched in May 2018.; Presented by journalists Fernando de Barros e Silva, Ana Clara Costa, and Celso Rocha de Barros, it is a co-production of Piauí magazine and Rádio Novelo production company about Brazilian politics.

== History ==
The Foro de Teresina podcast was originally launched by Piauí magazine in May 2018; from the outset, its content has focused on discussing Brazilian politics. Originally released on Thursdays, episodes are now aired on Fridays at 11 a.m. Popularly known as Foro, the podcast quickly gained popularity in the country, becoming one of the most listened to programs. The original podcast team included journalists Malu Gaspar, Fernando de Barros e Silva, and José Roberto de Toledo. Malu Gaspar remained on the program until January 2021, when she moved to work for the Rio de Janeiro newspaper O Globo. In her place, journalist Thais Bilenky was added to the podcast panel. .

In October 2023, journalist Thais Bilenky announced her resignation from Piauí magazine and the program. The dismissal was perceived as a form of censorship and suppression of public opinion. In solidarity with the dismissal of journalist Thais Bilenky, José Roberto Toledo requested to leave the podcast, stating that he was “very sad” about his colleague's dismissal.

The journalist posted on his Twitter account, “No one heard it, but yesterday I recorded my farewell to the Foro de Teresina. There's no point looking for it in the episode published this Friday. It's gone. To anyone listening, it seems that I'm still at the Foro as if nothing had happened,” where he stated that the excerpt from his farewell was not aired in the Foro de Teresina edition", accusing the publication of censoring his comment. The magazine's editor, journalist André Petry, published an editorial note denying the case of censorship, stating that as editor, he chose to exclude this surprise excerpt from the episode, arguing that the announcement, made without prior notice and during recording, used the magazine's platform against itself, in addition to overshadowing Thais' farewell, which should have been the main focus. The magazine defended its editorial prerogative not to publish content that constituted an outrage against itself, distinguishing this from fair criticism, which would be welcome. With the departures and the assessment that the conditions for maintaining the format no longer existed, the magazine decided to close the Foro de Teresina, with a final episode presented by journalist Fernando de Barros e Silva, who continued working at the magazine.

However, on March 15, 2024, the podcast returned with a new lineup, journalist Ana Clara Costa, who worked occasionally at the Foro de Teresina, and political scientist Celso Rocha de Barros, in addition to Fernando de Barros e Silva, who remained on the show.

== Audience ==
Since its launch, Foro de Teresina has frequently been among the most listened to podcasts in Brazil. Since its debut, Foro de Teresina has been on the annual list of the most listened to programs on the Apple Podcasts platform.

== Members ==
=== Current composition ===
- Fernando de Barros e Silva (2018–present);
- Ana Clara Costa (recurring member 2021–2023; permanent judge 2024–present);
- Celso Rocha de Barros (2024–present);

=== Recurring participations ===
- Bernardo Esteves (2020–present);

=== Former members ===
- Malu Gaspar (2018–2021);
- José Roberto de Toledo (2018–2023)
- Thais Bilenky (2021–2023).
