= Bernardo Esteves =

Brazilian journalist

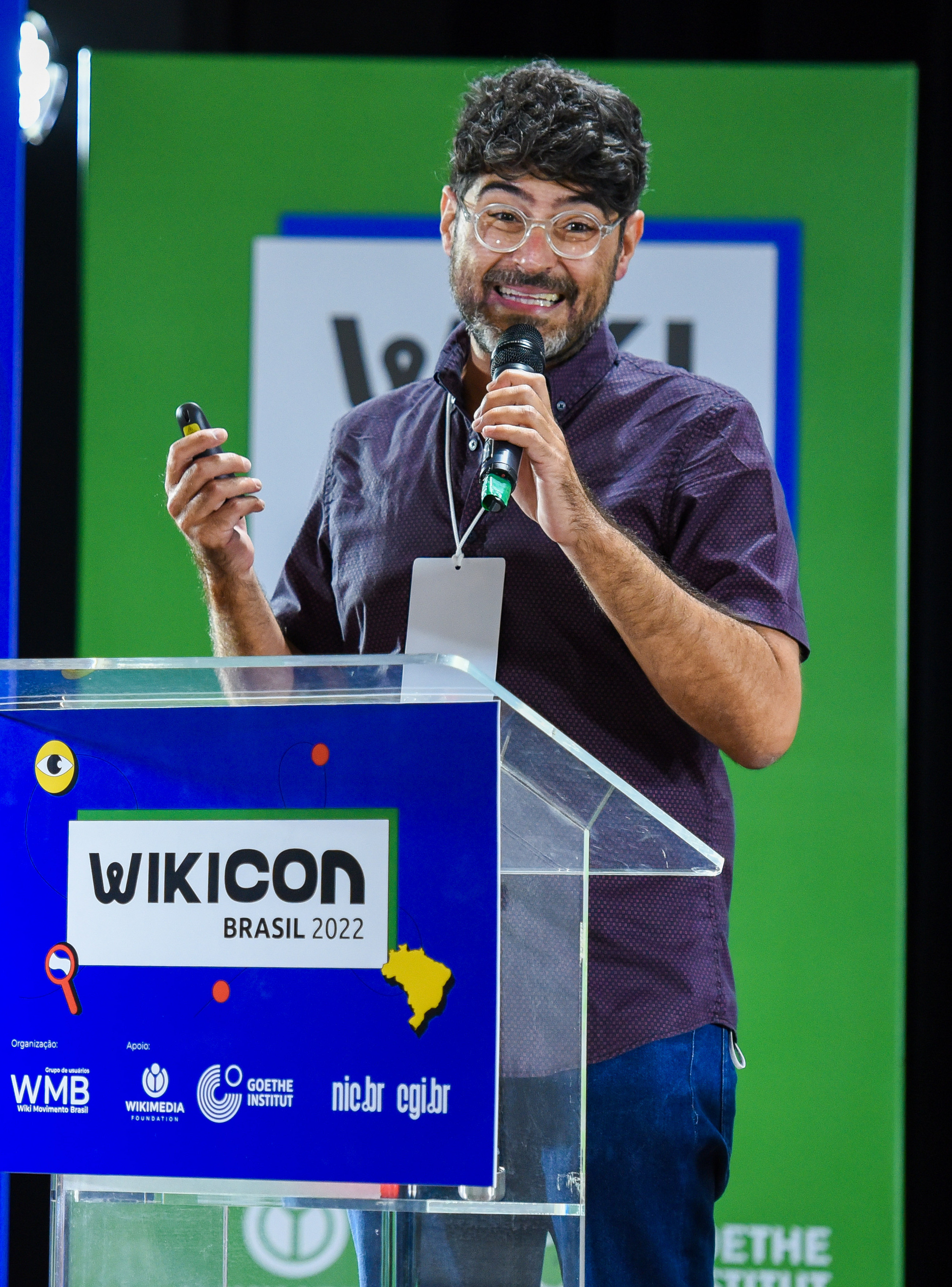
Esteves in 2022

Bernardo Esteves Gonçalves da Costa is a Brazilian journalist who works primarily in the field of environment and science. He is a contributor to Piauí Magazine and coordinates the podcast A Terra É Redonda (lit. 'The Earth Is Round').

== Career ==
Esteves completed his Ph.D. investigating controversy and denialism on the Portuguese-language Wikipedia, with a special focus on the topic of climate change denial. He has also published an article on contribution dynamics in entries related to the 2009 swine flu pandemic. In 2018, he was awarded the IMPA Journalism Prize for his piece on the particle accelerator Sirius. In 2020, Esteves was a finalist for the Vladimir Herzog Journalism Award for his podcast A Terra É Redonda. In 2022, he spoke at the invitation of the first Brazilian conference on Wikimedia projects on the topic of disinformation on Wikipedia.
