= Baron of Mogadouro =

Noble title

Barony Mogadouro
- Creation date: 12 October 1839
- Created by: Maria II of Portugal
- First holder: João António Ferreira de Moura, 1st Baron of Mogadouro
- Last holder: João António Ferreira de Moura, 3rd Baron of Mogadouro
- Status: Extinct

Baron of Mogadouro was a noble title created by a decree of Queen Maria II of Portugal, signed on 12 October 1839 and granted for two lifetimes, in favour of the magistrate João António Ferreira de Moura.

== Barons of Mogadouro (1839) ==
#	Name	Notes
1	João António Ferreira de Moura	1st Baron of Mogadouro
2	Ana Isabel Maria de Moura Pegado	Daughter of the 1st Baron; born on 10 October 1824; married on 5 October 1844 to António Saraiva de Albuquerque Vilhena, Baron of Mogadouro by marriage, honorary lieutenant colonel of the National Rifle Battalion of Guarda
3	João António Ferreira de Moura	3rd Baron of Mogadouro, son of the previous couple; title renewed by decree on 24 August 1852

== Notes ==
- This article was initially translated, in whole or in part, from the Portuguese Wikipedia article titled “Barão do Mogadouro”.
