= Jacinto Inácio Rodrigues da Silveira =

Jacinto Inácio Rodrigues da Silveira (Ponta Delgada, 13 October 1785 — Ponta Delgada, 20 December 1869), was a politician, rich merchant and landowner and first Baron of Fonte Bela, from the island of São Miguel, in the Portuguese archipelago of the Azores, who undertook the function of interim general administrator of the District of Ponta Delgada. He was nominated as Peer of the Realm, but died before taking his post.

== Biography ==
Jacinto Inácio Rodrigues da Silveira was born in Ponta Delgada on 13 October 1785, son of Jacinta Rosa de Medeiros Miranda Araújo and Jacinto Inácio da Silveira, a rich merchant linked to the orange industry in the 18th century.

He married on 8 October 1815 to Mariana Isabel de Meneses Amorim who, upon his death, was made first Countess of Fonte Bela. They had not children.

In 1836 he was made Baron of Laranjeiras and was given a peerage by letter dated 3 May 1842, but there is no indication that he ever went to Court.

One of the marks of the Baron of Fonte Bela was his large palace, today occupied by the Antero de Quental Secondary School.
