= Baron of Almeirim =

Barony Almeirim
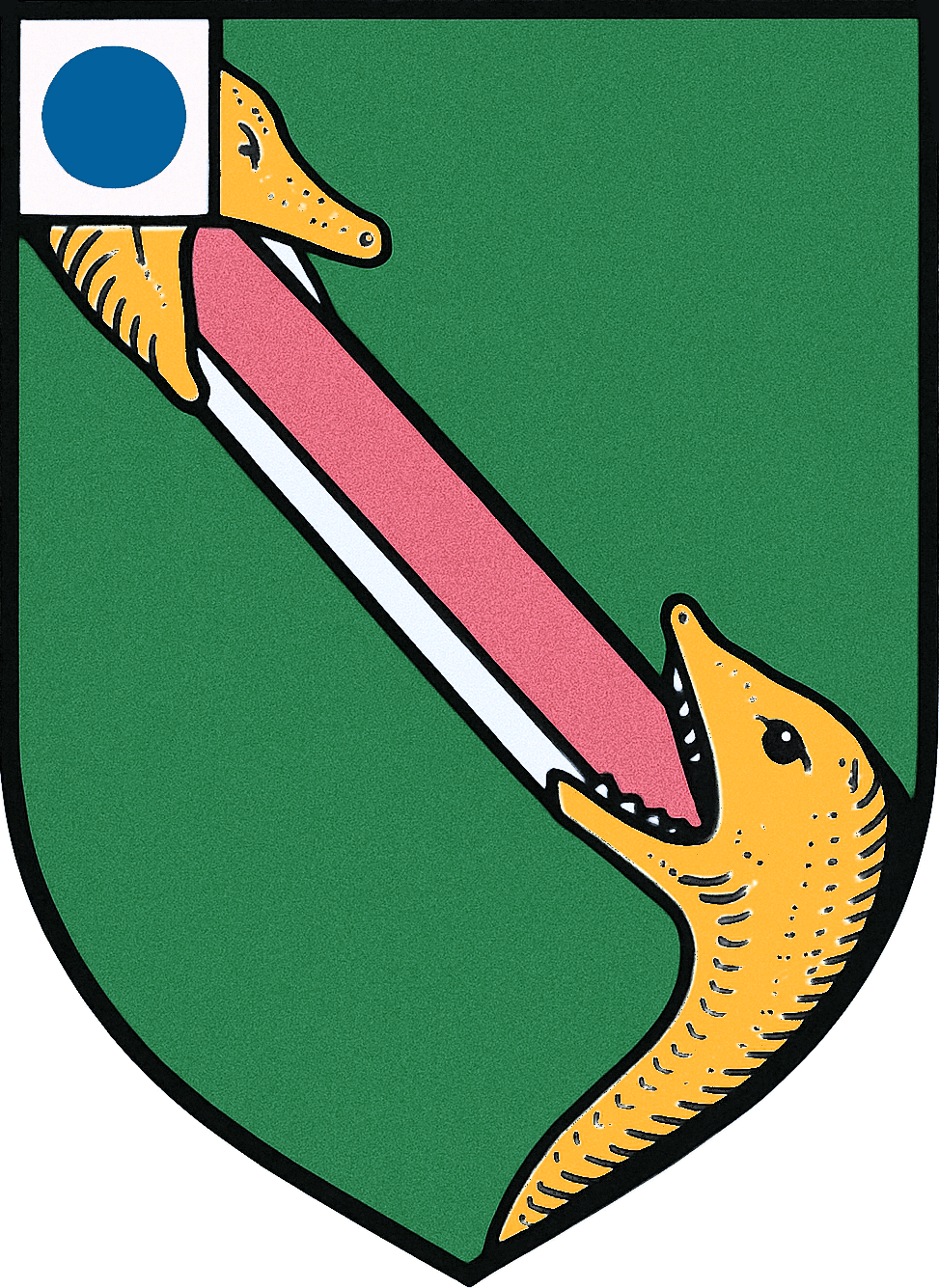
- Coat of Arms of the Baron of Almeirim
- Creation date: 23 October 1837
- Created by: Maria II of Portugal
- First holder: Manuel Nunes Freire da Rocha, 1st Baron of Almeirim
- Last holder: Manuel Braamcamp Freire, 3rd Baron of Almeirim
- Status: Extinct

Baron of Almeirim was a noble title created by Queen Maria II of Portugal, by decree dated 23 October 1837, in favour of Manuel Nunes Freire da Rocha.

== Barons of Almeirim (1837) ==
#	Name	Notes
1	Manuel Nunes Freire da Rocha	1st Baron of Almeirim
2	Manuel Nunes Braamcamp Freire	2nd Baron of Almeirim
3	Manuel Braamcamp Freire	3rd Baron of Almeirim

== Post-Monarchy claimants ==
#	Name	Notes
4	Carlos Braamcamp Freire	4th Baron of Almeirim

== Coat of arms ==
Arms: A shield bearing the arms of the Freire family — on a green field, a red bend cottised in gold, issuing from the mouths of two serpents of the same metal, armed gules.

Crest: Two gold serpent necks, entwined and turned back to back, also armed gules, and as a mark of cadency, a silver roundel bearing a blue bezant.

== Notes ==
- This article was initially translated, in whole or in part, from the Portuguese Wikipedia article titled “Barão de Almeirim”.
