= Baron of Serra da Estrela =

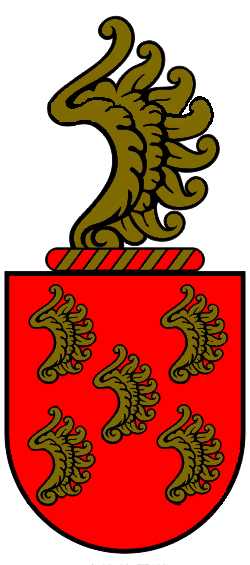
Coat-of-arms of the Baron of Serra da Estrela

The Baron of Serra da Estrela (Portuguese: Barão da Serra da Estrela) was a noble title created by decree of King John VI on 5 February 1818, in favor Gracia Eça Telles de Abreu.

== List of barons ==
1. Gracia Eça Telles de Abreu, 1st (and only) Baron of Serra da Estrela.
