= Baron of Barreto =

Barony Barreto
- Creation date: 6 June 1855
- Created by: Fernando II of Portugal on behalf of Pedro V of Portugal
- First holder: Henrique Bliss e Barreto, 1st Baron of Barreto
- Last holder: Henrique Eduardo Vítor Barreto, 2nd Baron of Barreto
- Status: Extinct
- Motto: Deus nobiscum quis contra

Baron of Barreto was a noble title created by the Regent Dom Fernando II, on behalf of Dom Pedro V, by Decree of 6 June 1855, in favour of Henrique Bliss e Barreto, a British subject.

== History ==
The title was originally created as Baron of Bliss, but its designation was altered to Baron of Barreto by Decree of 3 July 1873, following the grantee’s inheritance of a significant estate in Spain, bequeathed to him by Colonel Carlos António Barreto, which imposed upon him the obligation to adopt the surname Barreto.

== Barons of Barreto (1855) ==
#	Name	Notes
1	Henrique Bliss e Barreto (1818–1890)	1st Baron of Barreto
2	Henrique Eduardo Vítor Barreto	2nd Baron of Barreto

== Coat of arms ==
A truncated shield with the right field in black and the left field in red; with a silver bend running across it, charged with two blue enamelled lozenges, having in each of the shield’s fields two gold fleurs-de-lis arranged in saltire.

At the bottom of the same shield, the Motto: DEUS NOBISCUM QUIS CONTRA.

Crest: an upright arm, holding in its hand two darts and an arrow.

== Notes ==
- This article was initially translated, in whole or in part, from the Portuguese Wikipedia article titled “Barão de Barreto”.
