= Leitão (disambiguation) =

Coat of Arms of House of Almeida, Portugal

Leitão, sometimes Anglicized Leitao (literally meaning suckling pig), is a traditional Portuguese (and Pan-Iberian) dish made of a suckling pig, known more commonly under its Spanish name Lechón. Notable people with the surname include:

- Alexandre Filipe Clemente Leitão (born 1979), Portuguese footballer
- António Leitão (1960–2012), Portuguese athlete
- Ashley Leitão (born 1986), Canadian singer
- Cândido Firmino de Mello-Leitão (1886–1948), Brazilian zoologist
- Carlos Leitão, (born 1959), Canadian politician from Quebec
- Dave Leitao (born 1960), American basketball coach
- João Baptista da Silva Leitão de Almeida Garrett (1799-1854), Portuguese poet, playwright, novelist and politician
- Joaquim Leitão (born 1956), Portuguese film director
- Jorge Leitão (born 1974), Portuguese football player
- José Leitão de Barros (1896–1967), Portuguese film director and playwright
- Maria Luisa Leitao, Hong Kong television host and actress
- Miriam Leitão (born 1953), Brazilian journalist and television presenter
- Rafael Leitão (born 1979), Brazilian chess grandmaster
- Roberto Leitão (1937–2020), Brazilian wrestler
- Teresa Leitão (born 1951), Brazilian politician

== See also ==
- George N. Leighton (1912–2018), United States District Court judge; his original surname was Leitão
- Leitão & Irmão, a Portuguese luxury jewelry colloquially known as Leitão House
