= Baron of Alvaiázere =

Noble title in the Kingdom of Portugal

Barony Alvaiázere
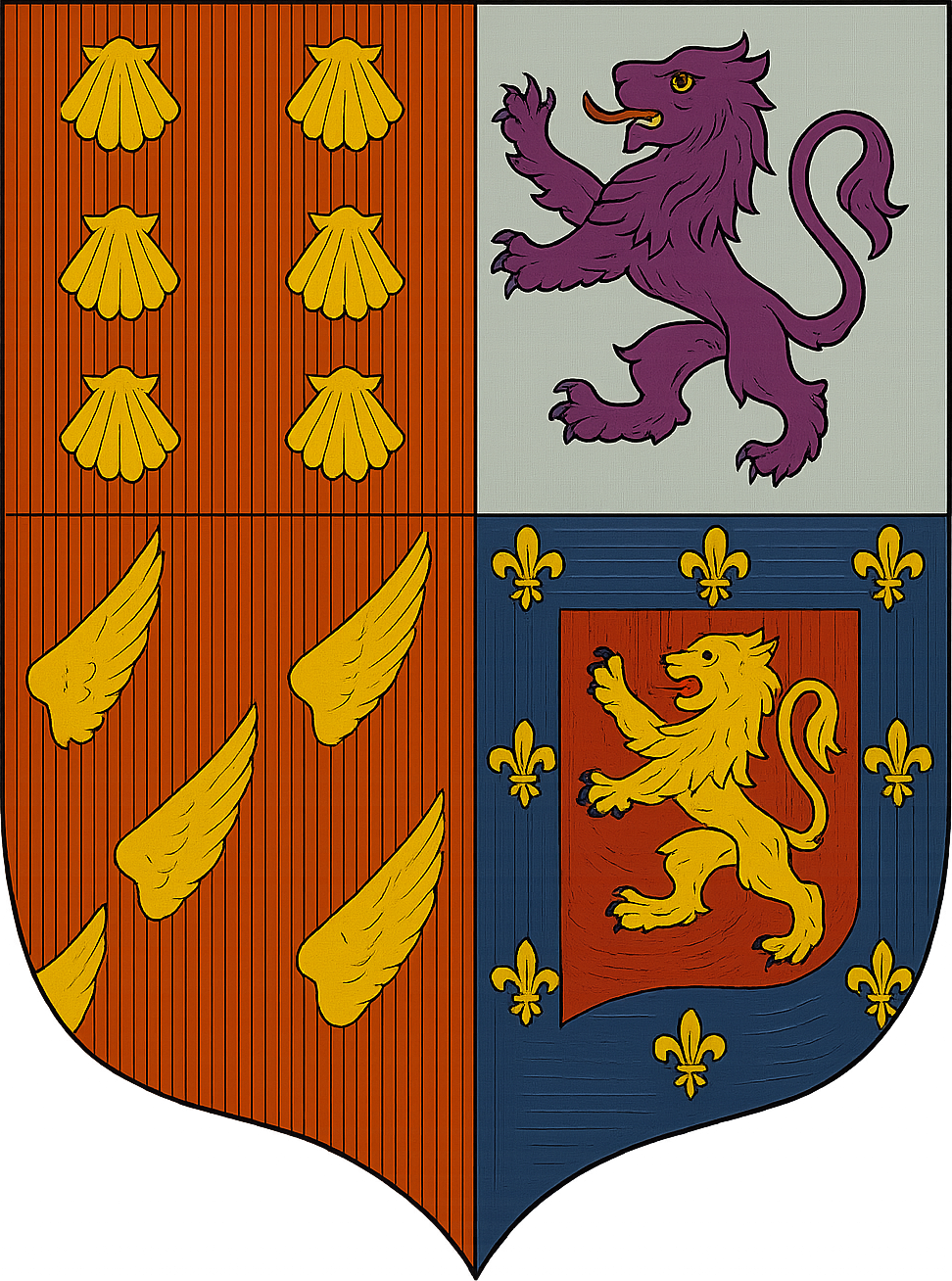
- Coat of Arms of the Baron of Alvaiázere
- Creation date: 6 February 1818
- Created by: John VI of Portugal
- First holder: Manuel Vieira da Silva, 1st Baron of Alvaiázere
- Last holder: Miguel Sousa e Almeida, 3rd Baron of Alvaiázere
- Status: Extinct

Baron of Alvaiázere is a noble title created by King John VI of Portugal, by decree dated 6 February 1818, in favour of Manuel Vieira da Silva Borges e Abreu.

== Barons of Alvaiázere (1818) ==
#	Name	Notes
1	Manuel Vieira da Silva	1st Baron of Alvaiázere
2	João Vieira da Silva de Vasconcelos Sousa e Almeida	2nd Baron of Alvaiázere
3	Miguel Portocarrero de Sotomaior Vieira da Silva de Vasconcelos Sousa e Almeida	3rd Baron of Alvaiázere

== Post-Monarchy claimants ==
#	Name	Notes
4	Luís António Vieira de Magalhães e Vasconcelos	4th Baron of Alvaiázere
5	Luís Miguel do Rego da Câmara de Magalhães Vieira e Vasconcelos	5th Baron of Alvaiázere

== Notes ==
- This article was initially translated, in whole or in part, from the Portuguese Wikipedia article titled “Barão de Alvaiázere”.
