= Brasil 247 =

Political News Media

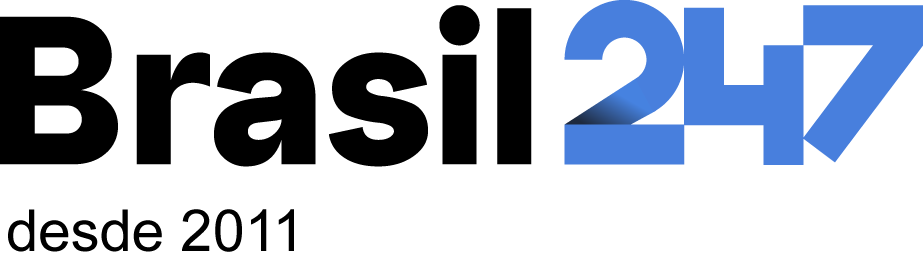
- Owner: Editora 247
- Founder: Leonardo Attuch
- Founded: 2011
- Political alignment: Left
- Language: Portuguese
- Country: Brazil
- Website: www.brasil247.com

Brasil 247 is a Brazilian news and political analysis website with an editorial line identified with the political left. It was founded in March 2011 by journalist Leonardo Attuch, who currently holds the position of CEO and member of the editorial board. It was created to serve a watchdog function that aimed to break the link between corporations and governments, modeling it on American political blogs like AlterNet and Daily Kos. The website is managed by Editora 247, which also controls the YouTube channel TV 247.

Its stated mission is to "empower the public through information and knowledge, and to promote the uncompromising defense of a full democracy." The website is seen as pro-Workers' Party, with opponents accusing it of being funded by that party.

In March 2022, Brasil 247 was included in the list of unreliable sources on the Portuguese Wikipedia.

== Attempted assassination of Jair Bolsonaro ==
On 12 September 2021, Brasil 247 posted on its YouTube channel a documentary by investigative reporter Joaquim de Carvalho entitled Bolsonaro e Adélio – Uma Fakeada no Coração do Brasil (lit. 'Bolsonaro and Adélio – A Fake Stabbing in the Heart of Brazil'). The documentary argues that then-presidential candidate Jair Bolsonaro faked his own attack to avoid presidential debates before the second round during the 2018 elections. The documentary originates from the assumption that the Federal Police did not investigate how the attack could have been faked. The film was analyzed and classified as a conspiracy theory by newspapers such as Folha de S.Paulo, Gazeta do Povo, CartaCapital and the Observatório da Imprensa, and contradicts the opinions of the Federal Police.

IThe video was taken down from the YouTube platform on 10 August 2022. YouTube claims that its hate speech policy did not allow denial, trivialization, or minimization of historical events, including the stabbing of Jair Bolsonaro. The Workers' Cause Party repudiated the act, classifying it as censorship.
