= Baron of Areia Larga =

Barony Areia Larga
- Creation date: 12 March 1854
- Created by: Fernando II of Portugal (as Regent during the minority of Pedro V of Portugal)
- First holder: António Garcia da Rosa, 1st Baron of Areia Larga
- Last holder: Manuel Maria Garcia da Rosa, 2nd Baron of Areia Larga
- Status: Extinct

Baron of Areia Larga was a noble title created by King Ferdinand II of Portugal, acting as Regent during the minority of King Pedro V of Portugal, by Decree dated 22 February 1854 and Royal Charter of 12 March 1857, in favour of António Garcia da Rosa.

== Barons of Areia Larga (1854) ==
#	Name	Notes
1	António Garcia da Rosa	1st Baron of Areia Larga
2	Manuel Maria Garcia da Rosa	2nd Baron of Areia Larga

== Notes ==
- This article was initially translated, in whole or in part, from the Portuguese Wikipedia article titled “Barão de Areia Larga”.
