= Baron of Areias de Cambra =

Barony Areias de Cambra
- Creation date: 13 August 1874
- Created by: Luís I of Portugal
- First holder: António Soares Leite Ferraz de Albergaria, 1st Baron of Areias de Cambra
- Status: Extinct

Baron of Areias de Cambra was a noble title created by King Luís I of Portugal, by Decree of 7 July and Royal Charter of 13 August 1874, in favour of António Soares Leite Ferraz de Albergaria.

== Barons of Areias de Cambra (1874) ==
#	Name	Notes
1	António Soares Leite Ferraz de Albergaria	1st Baron of Areias de Cambra

== Coat of arms ==
A quartered shield: in the first quarter, the arms of the Pereiras — on a red field, a silver cross, flory and voided of the field; in the second, the arms of the Sás — a field chequy argent and azure, with six pieces in fess and seven in pale, and the same in the opposite quarters.

Crest: a red cross, flory and voided, between two gold wing stumps.

== Notes ==
- This article was initially translated, in whole or in part, from the Portuguese Wikipedia article titled “Barão de Areias de Cambra”.
