= Baron of Alvoco da Serra =

Barony Alvoco da Serra
- Creation date: 27 July 1894
- Created by: Carlos I of Portugal
- First holder: António Luís Monteiro de Pina, 1st Baron of Alvoco da Serra
- Last holder: Joaquim Monteiro de Pina, 2nd Baron of Alvoco da Serra
- Status: Extinct

Baron of Alvoco da Serra was a noble title created by King Carlos I of Portugal, by decree dated 27 July 1894, in favour of António Luís Monteiro de Pina, whose title was changed from 1st Baron of São Domingos.

== Barons of Alvoco da Serra (1894) ==
#	Name	Notes
1	António Luís Monteiro de Pina	1st Baron of São Domingos, later 1st Baron of Alvoco da Serra
2	Joaquim Monteiro de Pina	2nd Baron of Alvoco da Serra

== Notes ==
- This article was initially translated, in whole or in part, from the Portuguese Wikipedia article titled “Barão de Alvoco da Serra”.
