= Baron of Alverca =

Barony Alverca
- Creation date: 4 April 1795
- Created by: Prince Regent Dom João on behalf of Queen Maria I of Portugal
- First holder: João António de Sá Pereira, 1st Baron of Alverca
- Status: Extinct

Baron of Alverca was a Portuguese noble title created by Prince Regent Dom João, acting on behalf of Queen Maria I of Portugal, by decree dated 4 April 1795, in favour of João António de Sá Pereira.

== Barons of Alverca (1795) ==
#	Name	Notes
1	João António de Sá Pereira	1st Baron of Alverca

== Notes ==
- This article was initially translated, in whole or in part, from the Portuguese Wikipedia article titled “Barão de Alverca”.
