= Baron of Folgosa =

Barony Folgosa
- Creation date: 8 November 1843
- Created by: Maria II of Portugal
- First holder: Jerónimo de Almeida Brandão e Sousa, 1st Baron of Folgosa
- Status: Extinct

Baron of Folgosa was a noble title created by Queen Maria II of Portugal, by Decree of 8 November 1843, in favour of Jerónimo de Almeida Brandão e Sousa.

== Barons of Folgosa (1843) ==
#	Name	Notes
1	Jerónimo de Almeida Brandão e Sousa	1st Baron of Folgosa

== Notas ==
- This article was initially translated, in whole or in part, from the Portuguese Wikipedia article titled “Barão da Folgosa”.
