= Baron of Aguiar =

Barony Aguiar
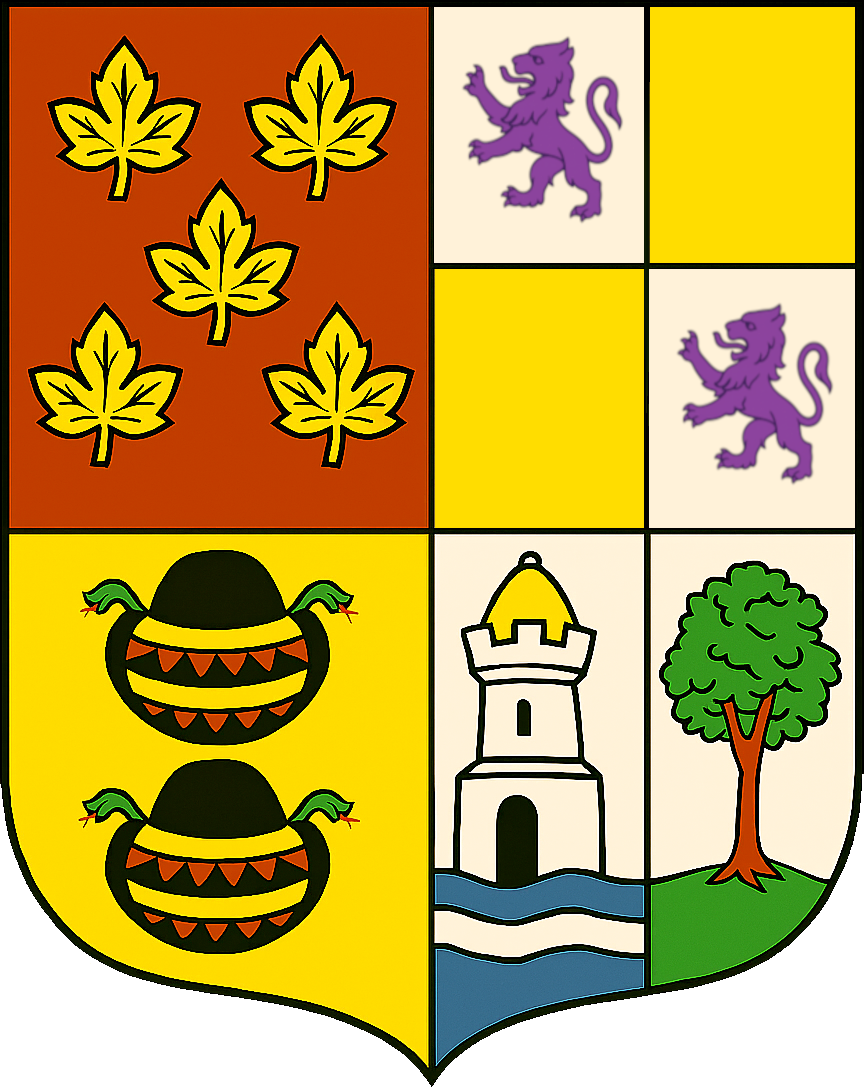
- Coat of Arms of the Baron of Aguiar
- Creation date: 17 June 1854
- Created by: Regent Ferdinand II of Portugal in the name of Pedro V of Portugal
- First holder: Silvino Luís Teixeira de Aguiar e Vasconcelos, 1st Baron of Aguiar
- Status: Extinct
- Extinction date: 12 September 1862

Baron of Aguiar was a title created by King Pedro V of Portugal, by decree of 17 June 1854 and by Royal Charter of 19 July 1854, in favour of Silvino Luís Teixeira de Aguiar e Vasconcelos, a Knight Nobleman of the Royal Household, who served as a deputy, a Judge of the Supreme Council of Military Justice, and President of the Court of Appeal of Goa.

The title became extinct in 12 September 1862 with the death, without issue, of the 1st holder.

== Barons of Aguiar (1854) ==
1. Silvino Luís Teixeira de Aguiar e Vasconcelos, 1st Baron of Aguiar.

== Coat of arms ==
A quartered shield; in the first quarter, the arms of the Figueiredos — five fig leaves, veined and edged in gold, on a red field; in the second quarter, the arms of the Telles — a quartered shield, in the first quarter, a purple lion armed in blue on a silver field; in the second, a field of gold, alternating accordingly; in the third quarter, the arms of the Pachecos — on a field of gold, two black cauldrons banded with three fesses of gold and red, and at each junction of the handles four green serpent heads; and in the fourth quarter, the arms of the Moraes — a quarter parted per pale, on the first, on a red field, a silver tower roofed in gold, above a river of silver and blue, on the second, on a silver field, a green mulberry tree — Crest of the Figueiredos — two red lion’s arms in saltire, each holding a fig leaf in its claw.
