= Baron of Arede Coelho =

Barony Arede Coelho
- Creation date: 24 November 1898
- Created by: Carlos I of Portugal
- First holder: José Inácio Coelho, 1st Baron of Arede Coelho
- Status: Extinct

The title of Baron of Arede Coelho (Portuguese: Barão de Arêde Coelho) was created by King Carlos I on 24 November 1898 for José Inácio Coelho.

== Barons of Arede Coelho (1898) ==
#	Name	Notes
1	José Inácio Coelho	1st Baron of Arede Coelho

== Notes ==
- This article was initially translated, in whole or in part, from the Portuguese Wikipedia article titled “Barão de Arede Coelho”.
