= Piauí (magazine) =

Brazilian culture magazine

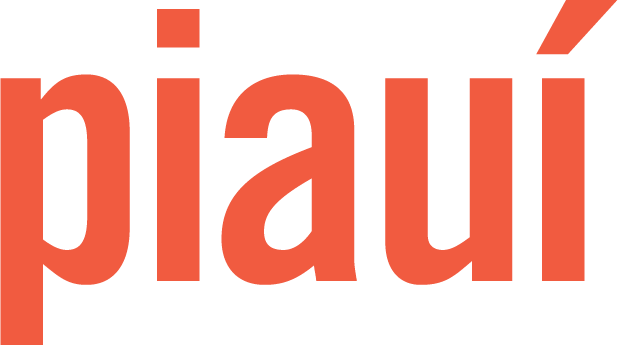
- piauí (magazine)
- Editor: André Petry
- Categories: Cultural magazine
- Frequency: Monthly
- Circulation: 60,000
- Publisher: Editora Alvinegra
- First issue: October 2006
- Country: Brazil
- Based in: Rio de Janeiro
- Language: Portuguese
- Website: piaui.uol.com.br

Piauí, stylized as piauí, is a Brazilian monthly magazine of journalism, essays and culture created by the documentarian João Moreira Salles. First published in October 2006, piauí is edited by Editora Alvinegra and printed and distributed by Editora Abril. piaui was inspired by the magazines Senhor, Realidade and The New Yorker.

== Sections ==
These are the main sections in piauí nowadays:

- Chegada (Arrival)
- Colaboradores (Collaborators)
- Esquina (Corner)
- Diário (Journal)
- Poesia (Poetry)
- Cartas (Letters)
- Perfil (Profile)
- Quadrinhos (Comics)
- Ficção (Fiction)
- Concurso (Literary contest)
- Tipos brasileiros (Brazilian characters)
- Despedida (Farewell)

The magazine also produces a podcast called Foro de Teresina, which discusses politics on a weekly basis and is one of the most popular of its kind in the country.
