= Portuguese Wikipedia =

Portuguese-language edition of Wikipedia

- Logo of the Portuguese Wikipedia

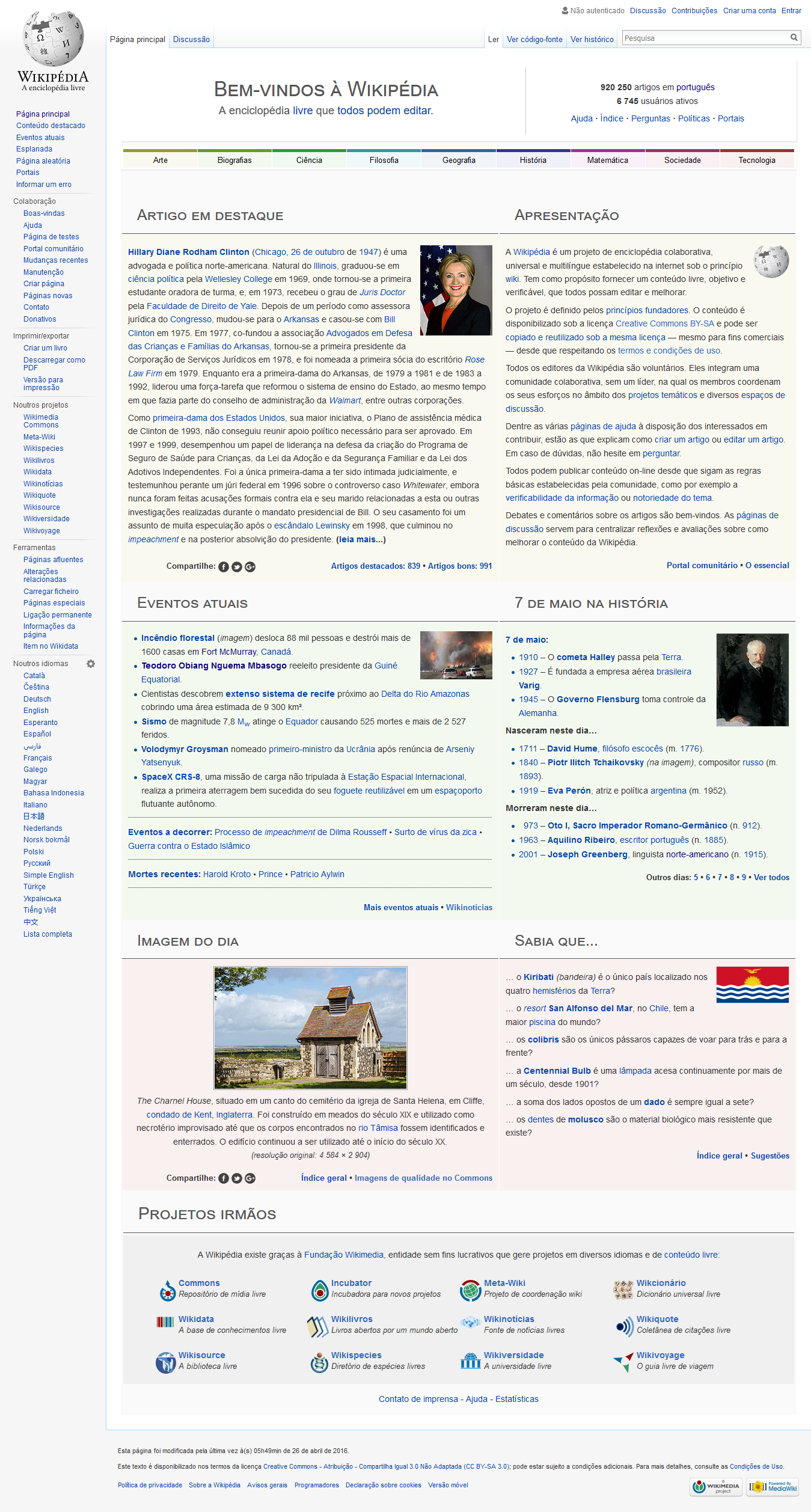
- Screenshot Main Page of the Portuguese Wikipedia in May 2016
- Website type: Internet encyclopedia project
- Available in: Portuguese
- Owner: Wikimedia Foundation
- Website: pt.wikipedia.org
- Commercial: No
- Registration: Required except for reading articles
- Users: 3.49 million (as of 19 September 2026)
- Launched: 11 May 2001; 25 years ago
- Content license: Creative Commons Attribution/ Share-Alike 4.0 (most text also dual-licensed under GFDL); Media licensing varies

The Portuguese Wikipedia (Portuguese: Wikipédia em português) is the Portuguese-language edition of Wikipedia, the free encyclopedia. It was started on 11 May 2001.

Wikipedia is the 19th most accessed website in Brazil and the 10th most accessed in Portugal. As of September 2026, it is the 18th largest Wikipedia by article count, containing 1,182,550 articles, 3,490,545 registered users, and 68,540 files. The Portuguese edition is one of the Wikipedias that does not allow edits from unregistered users. It disabled edits from IP editors in 2020.

== History ==
The Portuguese Wikipedia was the third edition of Wikipedia to be created, simultaneously with other languages. It started its activities on 11 May 2001, having reached the mark of one hundred thousand articles on 26 January 2006.

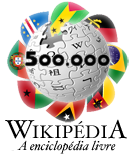
Logo commemorating 500,000 articles

Logo commemorating one million articles

From late 2004, the edition grew rapidly. In May 2005, it overtook both the Spanish and Italian language Wikipedias. By comparison, in May 2004 it was only the 17th Wikipedia by the number of articles.

Portuguese articles can contain variations of writing, as European Portuguese and Brazilian Portuguese have differences in vocabulary and usage. Articles can contain written characteristics of one or the other variant depending on who wrote the article.

The Portuguese Wikipedia community decided not to split a separate Brazilian Portuguese version off from the Portuguese Wikipedia. In 2005, a proposal to fork Portuguese Wikipedia and create a Brazilian Portuguese (pt-br) version was voted down by the Wikimedia community. In 2007 another one to create a European Portuguese version was rejected too by the Wikimedia community. In 2009 another one to create in Brazilian Portuguese was rejected, but this time by the language committee, according to new policies to create new Wikipedia editions, with the following explanation: "Brazilian Portuguese is not a separate language.. this is a requirement."

Beginning in January 2007, the project experienced a decrease of the share of edits by unregistered users (from around 20 to around 15%) and an increase of the share of such edits being reverted, from about 15% to a peak of 25% in late 2008, which suggests an increase in disruptive editing. In the same month, JavaScript was added that forced all unregistered users to preview their edit before saving it.

In December 2010, the Portuguese Wikipedia overtook the Dutch language Wikipedia in number of articles, but in the first quarter of 2011, it was surpassed by the Russian and Dutch language Wikipedias, ranking in the tenth position. In April 2016, the project had 1388 active editors who made at least five edits in that month.

In August 2012, Brazilian Supreme Court Justice Gilmar Mendes accused the Portuguese Wikipedia of being "partisan and highly controlled." According to him, his article was being targeted by an "ideological attack" and, as an encyclopedia, the entry should only be informative about the subject, without incorporating third-party opinions or journalistic denunciations. This criticism was motivated by the reaction to the article about him containing accusations from CartaCapital magazine, which Gilmar Mendes is contesting in court.

On 8 August 2014, an article on the O Globo website stated that a device connected to the internet via the wireless network of the Planalto Palace altered information on Miriam Leitão and Carlos Alberto Sardenberg's Portuguese Wikipedia pages in May 2013, with the aim of defaming them. The information inserted into Miriam's article described her economic analyses and forecasts as "disastrous," and accused her of having "passionately" defended banker Daniel Dantas when he was arrested by the Federal Police.

Faced with the controversy generated by the episode, the government initially claimed that it was "impossible" to identify those responsible for the criticism. Later, President Dilma Rousseff ordered an investigation to try to identify those responsible for the editing. After a month of investigations, the Civil House reported that the investigation committee established to investigate the critical changes to journalists concluded that the edits were made by civil servant Luiz Alberto Marques Vieira Filho, from the Secretariat of Institutional Relations. The civil servant admitted authorship of the changes and requested resignation from the leadership position he held in the Ministry of Planning. There was a record at the Superior Electoral Court (TSE) of a person with the same name affiliated with the Workers' Party (PT) in Ourinhos, since October 1999. The party's press office reported having located the membership form of Luiz Alberto Marques Vieira, but not that of Luiz Alberto Marques Vieira Filho.

In a video posted to his official Facebook page in June 2018, Brazilian politician Levy Fidelix criticized Wikipedia for disapproving of the content in the entry about his biography. He stated that the encyclopedia should be "banned by national laws" and that the volunteer editors who contribute to the project are "scoundrels, bandits, and fakes." According to him, his biography includes "false" versions about the lawsuit against him for gender discrimination. "In the second [lawsuit], I won, and Wikipedia didn't put it there."

On 25 March 2022, the Brazilian Press Association (ABI), in a statement signed by its president, journalist Paulo Jerônimo, condemned "Wikipédia Brasil [sic]" for classifying the news websites Brasil 247 and Diário do Centro do Mundo, which it classified as "progressive portals," as unreliable sources of information, expressing solidarity with these websites. According to the ABI, this decision was an attack on freedom of information and on "the importance of the diversity of viewpoints in a democratic regime," which it considered especially important in Brazil.

=== Abraham Weintraub ===
On 8 April 2019, President Jair Bolsonaro announced on his X account that Abraham Weintraub would succeed Ricardo Vélez Rodríguez as Brazil's Minister of Education. A Portuguese Wikipedia page for Weintraub was created about three hours later. After multiple incidents of vandalism, the administrator of the Portuguese Wikipedia, Chronus, protected the page against edits by inexperienced users for 45 days.

Up to June 27, the article listed several controversies in which the minister was involved, notably Weintraub and his brother's failed attempt to have their father declared legally incompetent in court and the budget cuts imposed by Weintraub on federal universities and institutes. Other controversies included accusations of nepotism due to his family's positions at the Federal University of São Paulo, his claim that there was "chaos" on federal university campuses, a video on XWeintraub claims that the Ministry of Education is a victim of fake news to the tune of "Singin' in the Rain", his stance on student protests against the government, and his encouragement for teachers and students who supported the protests to be reported. The article also mentioned that Weintraub's father was persecuted by the military dictatorship in Brazil and wrote a book defending the decriminalization of cannabis, a progressive position opposed to Weintraub's conservative views in the Bolsonaro government. All information in the article was supported by reliable sources, as required by Wikipedia's policies.

== Characteristics ==
The countries in which the Portuguese Wikipedia is the most popular language version of Wikipedia are shown in violet.

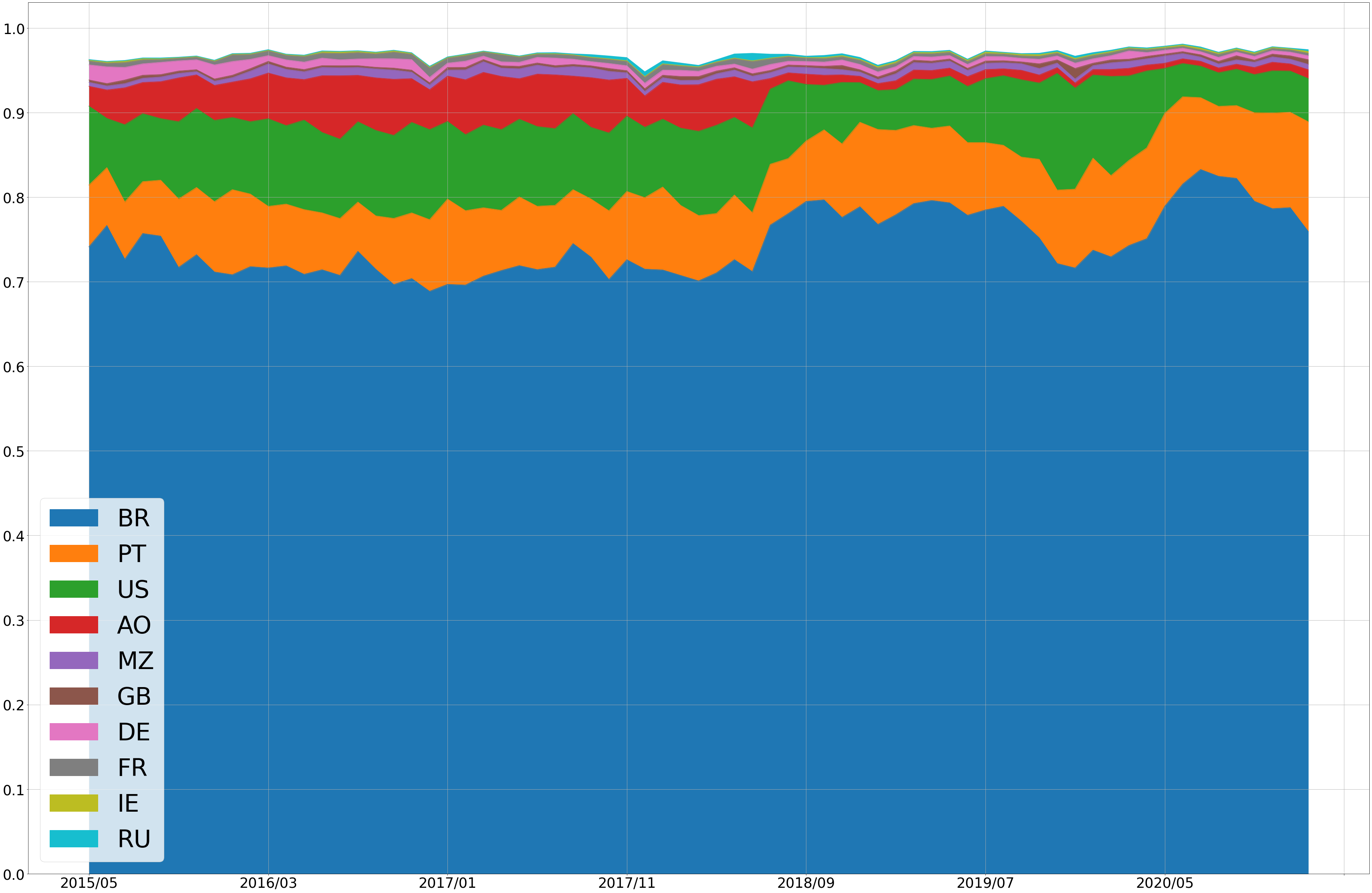
Origin of viewers on the Portuguese Wikipedia

The Portuguese language Wikipedia is different from the English one in a number of aspects.

- Until 2009, fair use was not allowed on Portuguese Wikipedia. Debates have been raised before concerning the fair use policy, all of them failing to have the uploading of such images allowed. Uploading pictures at the Portuguese Wikipedia was even fully disabled until then. In August 2009, though, a new debate was raised in order for users to approve or deny the creation of a policy of uploading fair use media (named "Uso Restrito de Conteúdo" there, which translates as Restricted Use of Contents). This debate resulted in 142 votes for "yes" against 120 votes for "no", which means the policy was approved and implemented. Nowadays, fair use files are labeled as "Conteúdo restrito", meaning restricted content.
- Like English, Portuguese has regional differences in vocabulary, grammar, and spelling. It is widely accepted that an article written in Brazilian Portuguese should be kept as it is, and the same applies to articles in European Portuguese. However, if one rewrites the article in another variant (provided content was changed, not merely the language), but leaves some words in the former variant, these words should be rewritten in accordance with the new version's variant of the article.
- In order to hinder spamming and trolling, completion of a CAPTCHA image was required for all unregistered users to make any edit. It was disabled on 1 January 2014.
- Since 2020, after a community vote that lasted from 4 September to 4 October, the Portuguese Wikipedia no longer allows edits from unregistered users (IP addresses).

As of 2019, the Portuguese Wikipedia had 316,000 unique categories, 3.57% of them lacking an appropriate page in the category namespace. The average article in this language version has nine categories, while the ratio of unique categories per article is 0.314. The largest number of articles belong to Arts (16%) and Geography (14%) categories. Articles related to Crime and Events have the highest average quality. Those related to Health are read more often, and articles in the Business category have the highest average author interest.

In April 2022, the European Union's East StratCom Task Force published its findings that four pro-Russian disinformation outlets (SouthFront, NewsFront, InfoRos and Strategic Culture Foundation) were referenced in 45 articles of the Portuguese Wikipedia. This made it the Wikipedia edition that was the fourth most-affected by such disinformation, after the Russian, Arabic and Spanish Wikipedias. The Task Force wrote:

On the English version of Wikipedia, there seems to be a consensus that state-sponsored disinformation sites aren't legitimate sources [...]. One can only guess whether other language versions will follow suit, but there is nothing stopping anyone from launching that debate, pointing out the English Wikipedia example as a best practice.

== Notes ==
- Lih, Andrew. The Wikipedia Revolution: How a Bunch of Nobodies Created the World's Greatest Encyclopedia. Hyperion, New York City. 2009. First Edition. ISBN 978-1-4013-0371-6 (alkaline paper).

== Bibliography ==
- Costa, Bernardo Esteves Gonçalves da (2014). As controvérsias da ciência na Wikipédia em português: o caso do aquecimento global [The controversies of science on Wikipedia in Portuguese: the case of global warming] (PDF) (in Portuguese). Rio de Janeiro: Centro de Ciências Matemáticas e da Natureza da Universidade Federal do Rio de Janeiro. Archived (PDF) from the original on 29 November 2023.
- Costa, Pedro Rodrigues; Martins, Moisés de Lemos; Perneta, Paulo Santos (2021). "Wikipédia em língua portuguesa: dinâmicas, estruturas e dilemas na colaboração para o conhecimento" [Wikipedia in Portuguese language: dynamics, structures, and dilemmas in collaboration for knowledge]. Revista Ciências Humanas (in Portuguese). 14 (30). Taubaté: Universidade de Taubaté. doi:10.32813/2179-1120.2121.v14.n2.a747. hdl:1822/73855. ISSN 2179-1120. Archived from the original on 13 August 2023.
- Esteves, Bernardo (July 2012). "Cooperação conturbada" [Turbulent cooperation]. revista piauí (in Portuguese). Archived from the original on 20 July 2023.
- Machuy, Camilla Cavalcante de Souza (2016). Wikipédia midiática: cotidianidades, compilação de saberes e lutas de poder nos bastidores da Enciclopédia Livre [Media Wikipedia: daily life, compilation of knowledge, and power struggles behind the scenes of the Free Encyclopedia] (in Portuguese). Instituto de Arte e Comunicação Social da Universidade Federal Fluminense. Archived from the original on 18 November 2022.
