= Duarte, Duke of Guimarães (1541–1576) =

Duarte
- Constable of Portugal
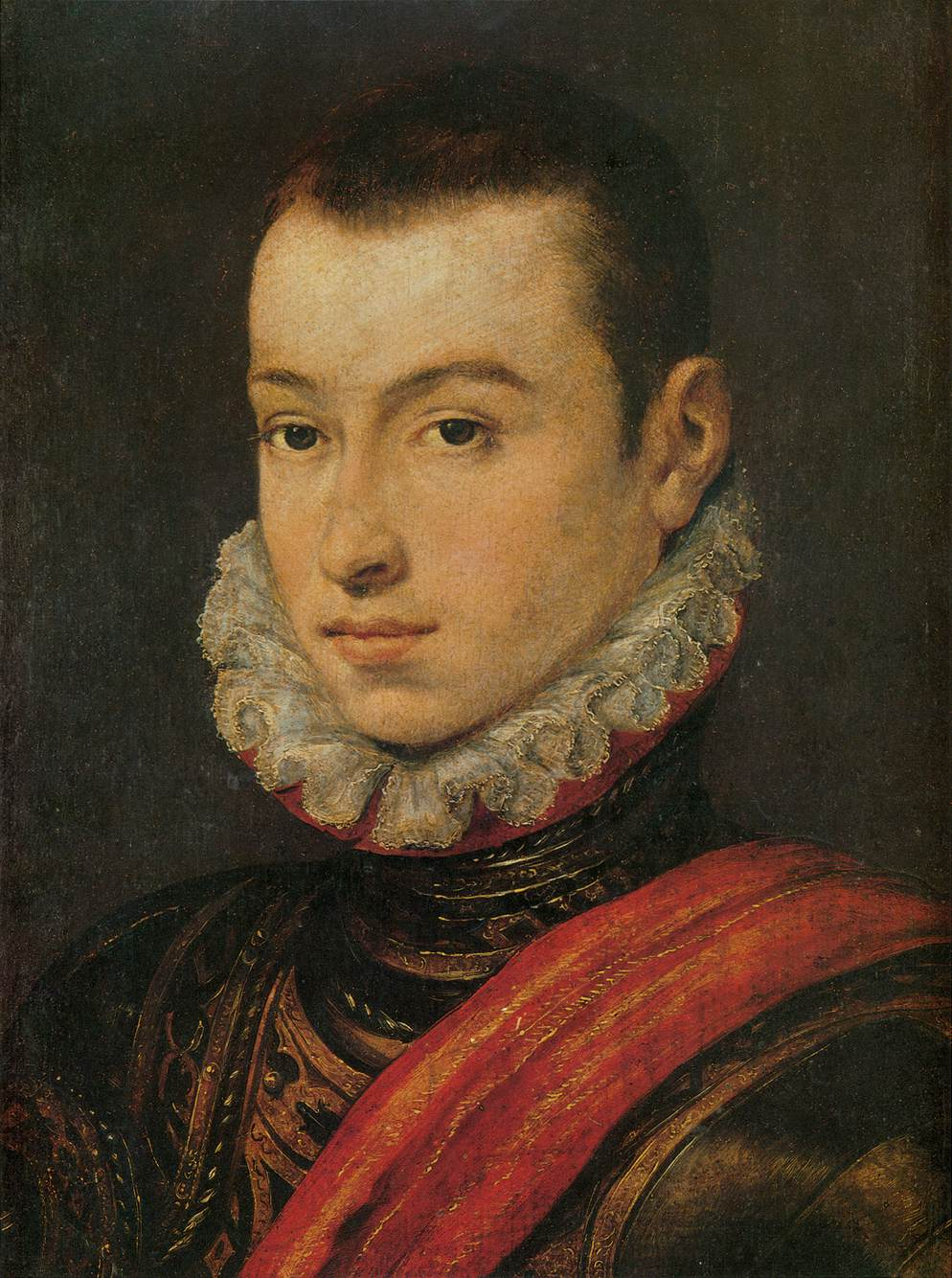
- Unidentified portrait considered to possibly depict the 5th Duke of Guimarães.

5th Duke of Guimarães
- Tenure: 1541 - 1576
- Predecessor: Duarte of Portugal
- Successor: Title abolished later John IV of Portugal
- Born: March 1541; Almeirim
- Died: 28 November 1576 (aged 35); Évora
- House: Aviz
- Father: Duarte of Portugal, 4th Duke of Guimarães
- Mother: Isabel of Braganza, Duchess of Guimarães

Duarte, Duke of Guimarães (March 1541, in Almeirim – 28 November 1576, in Évora) was a Portuguese infante (prince), son of Duarte of Portugal, 4th Duke of Guimarães and his wife, Isabel of Braganza. He served as Constable of the Kingdom, the highest military authority in the Portuguese Empire, second only to the monarch.

== Early life ==
Arms used by the Duke of Guimarães.

Through his father, he was a grandson of King Manuel I of Portugal; through his mother, he was a grandson of James, 4th Duke of Braganza.

He was born posthumously and he inherited his father's titles and estates: the Dukedom of Guimarães. He was one of the most influential nobles during the reigns of Kings John III and Sebastian.

== Political career ==
As member of the State Council he voted, in 1569, for the marriage of King Sebastian to Margaret of Valois (who later became Henry IV's first wife) and, in 1574, he escorted King Sebastian in his first trip to Tangiers, in north Africa.

In 1557, when King John III died, Duarte was one of the three legitimate surviving male descendants of King Manuel I of Portugal (together with King Sebastian and Cardinal-Infante Henry).

== Personal life ==
King Sebastian was jealous of this and several times showed disrespect for Duarte's rank. When the King didn't invite Duarte to a royal bullfight, in Xabregas (Lisbon), Duarte was quite upset and, finally, he retired to Évora where, some months later, he died single and without issue.

Duarte had two sisters, both married to remarkable Renaissance princes:

- Infanta Maria of Guimarães (1538–1577), also known as Maria de Portugal, married to the Italian prince Alessandro Farnese, Duke of Parma and Piacenza;
- Infanta Catherine of Guimarães (1540–1614), also known as Catarina de Portugal, married to the Portuguese prince John, 6th Duke of Braganza.

After she married the portuguese prince, Infanta Catherine of Guimarães inherited her brother estates and rights to the Dukedom of Guimarães. During the 1580 Portuguese succession crisis, Catherine and her husband, John I of Braganza, were important claimants to the Portuguese throne.

== Ancestry ==
Ancestors of Duarte, Duke of Guimarães (1541–1576)

8. Ferdinand, Duke of Viseu
4. Manuel I of Portugal
9. Beatrice of Portugal
2. Edward, Duke of Guimarães
10. Ferdinand II of Aragon
5. Maria of Aragon
11. Isabella I of Castile
1. Edward, Duke of Guimarães
12. Fernando, 3rd Duke of Braganza
6. Jaime, 4th Duke of Braganza
13. Isabel of Viseu
3. Isabel of Braganza
14. Juan Alonso, 3rd Duke of Medina Sidonia
7. Leonor de Guzmán y Velasco
15. Isabel de Velasco y Mendoza

== See also ==
- Duke of Guimarães
- Dukedoms in Portugal

== Bibliography ==
"Nobreza de Portugal e do Brasil" – Vol. II, page 651. Published by Zairol Lda., Lisbon 1989.

Portuguese nobility
Preceded by Duarte I, 4th Duke of Guimarães	Duke of Guimarães; 1541–1576	Succeeded by John II of Braganza, 6th Duke of Guimarães
