= Margherita Farnese =

- Hereditary Princess of Mantua
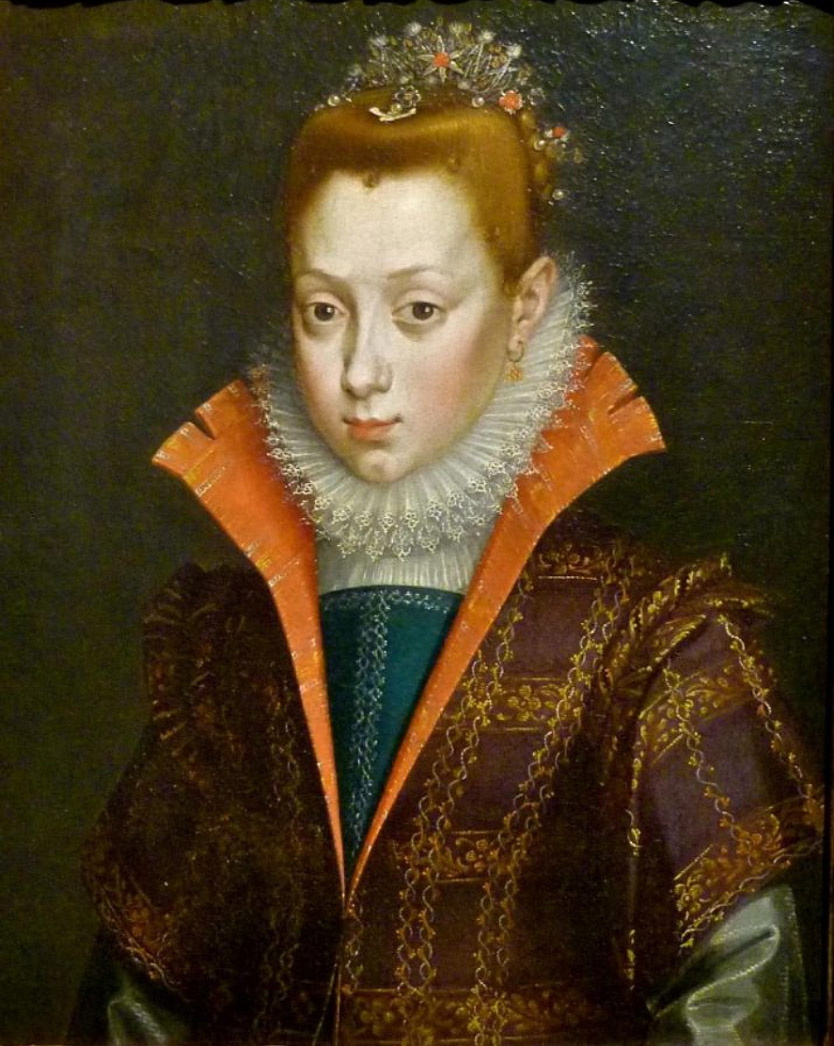
- Born: 7 November 1567; Parma, Duchy of Parma and Piacenza
- Died: 13 April 1643 (aged 75); Monastery of Sant'Alessandro, Parma, Duchy of Parma and Piacenza
- Burial: Sanctuary of Santa Maria della Steccata, Parma
- Spouse: Vincenzo Gonzaga, Hereditary Prince of Mantua (m. 1581; ann. 1583)
- Father: Alexander Farnese, Duke of Parma
- Mother: Infanta Maria of Portugal

Margherita Farnese (7 November 1567 – 13 April 1643), was an Italian noblewoman member of the House of Farnese and by marriage Hereditary Princess of Mantua between 1581–1583.

Her marriage to Vincenzo Gonzaga, Hereditary Prince of Mantua was dissolved after two years due to Margherita's inability to consummate it. After annulment, the princess took monastic vows with the name of Sister Maura Lucenia and became abbess of the monastery of Sant'Alessandro, Parma.

== Life ==
=== Early years ===
Born on 7 November 1567 in Parma, Margherita was the eldest child and only daughter of Alexander Farnese, Hereditary Prince of Parma (since 1586 was ruling Duke of Parma) and Infanta Maria of Portugal. On the paternal side, the princess was the granddaughter of Ottavio Farnese, Duke of Parma and Margaret of Austria (in turn an illegitimate daughter of Charles V, Holy Roman Emperor); on the maternal side, she was the granddaughter of the Infante Duarte of Portugal, Duke of Guimarães and Isabel of Braganza. Named after her paternal grandmother, Margherita was baptized on 11 January 1568 with her godparents being Pope Pius V (represented by Bishop Ferdinando (Ferrante) Farnese –a distant cousin of the Latera branch of the Ducal family) and her paternal great-grandmother Gerolama Orsini, Dowager Duchess of Parma (represented by Caterina De Nobili Sforza).

In 1577, Margherita's mother died; in her will, she entrusted to her mother-in-law the guardianship of her 13-year-old daughter. In March 1580, the princess and her grandmother Margaret of Austria left Piacenza for the Netherlands; there Margaret of Austria was going to support her son, Hereditary Prince Alessandro of Parma, who became a Governor after the death of John of Austria. In Namur Margherita was in frequent contact with her father, despite the fact that there was friction between him and her grandmother over their co-Governonship of the Netherlands. As a child, Margherita was ill with smallpox, which disfigured her face. The princess didn't receive a good education; she did not even learn Latin. At the same time, she had a kind and modest character. She was fond of poetry and music.

=== Marriage and annulment ===
Matrimonial negotiations between the Houses of Farnese and Gonzaga ended in November 1580. Despite a long-standing feud between both families (since 1547, when Ferrante Gonzaga had organised a plot against Pier Luigi Farnese, first Duke of Parma and Margherita's paternal grandfather), the parties came to a mutually beneficial agreement on the marriage of Margherita and Vincenzo Gonzaga, Hereditary Prince of Mantua. The initiator of the conclusion of the alliance between both houses was Cardinal Alessandro Farnese, Margherita's paternal grand-uncle. Negotiations on behalf of the groom were led by his father, Guglielmo Gonzaga, Duke of Mantua. The marriage was not only dynastic, but also pursued political goals: it was to become the basis of an alliance between the Duchies of Parma and Mantua against the Grand Duchy of Tuscany. The parties agreed on the demarcation of the border between their states and on the bride's dowry, which amounted to 300,000 ducats. The marriage contract also determined the immediate return of Margherita to her homeland. On 10 December 1580, the princess, accompanied by her relative Girolama Farnese, left Namur. On 17 February 1581 their cortege arrived in Piacenza, where a couple of weeks later the bride and groom met for the first time.

On 2 March 1581, at Piacenza Cathedral, the Bishop of Parma Ferrante Farnese held the wedding ceremony of Margherita Farnese and the Hereditary Prince of Mantua. A few days after the wedding, it turned out that the marriage was still unconsummated. The Crown Prince's secretary, Dr. Marcello Donati, reported this to Duke Guglielmo of Mantua, citing a congenital "obstruction" [narrow vagina] in his son's wife as the cause of the problem. In this regard, the famous physiologist Girolamo Fabrici d'Acquapendente was invited to Parma from Padua. After examining Margherita, he advised to expand her vagina with a cone-shaped object the size of her husband's penis.

In Mantua, where the newlyweds solemnly entered on 30 April 1581, the princess was examined by another doctor, Giulio Cesare Aranzio, and also proposed to remove the obstacle by artificial means. Margherita's grandmother, Margaret of Austria, categorically opposed this, fearing for the health of her granddaughter. Carnival of 1582 was held by the Hereditary Prince and Princess in Ferrara, where they stayed with Duke Alfonso II d'Este and his wife Margherita Gonzaga, Vincenzo's older sister. A year after the wedding, their marriage was still unconsummated. Duke Guglielmo of Mantua, wishing to continue the dynasty, began to insist on the artificial intervention, otherwise, he threatened with divorce. In June 1582, despite the protests of her father-in-law, by order of Duke Ottavio of Parma, Margherita's grandfather, the Hereditary Princess was taken away from Mantua. In Parma, she was examined by doctors again, including Andrea Marcolini da Fano, personal physician to Cardinal Alessandro Farnese. All of them excluded the possibility of risking Margherita's life in case of surgery.

However, the relationship between the Houses of Farnese and Gonzaga was ruined. In December 1582, Dukes Ottavio of Parma and Guglielmo of Mantua appealed to Pope Gregory XIII. The pontiff entrusted this delicate mission to Cardinal Carlo Borromeo. In February 1583, the Cardinal arrived in Parma, where, after listening to the opinions of doctors and interested parties, he persuaded the Hereditary Princess to abandon the operation and follow him to Milan. On 26 May 1583, Margherita entered in the Benedictine monastery in Milan as a novice, from where she soon moved to the Monastery of San Paolo in Parma. On 9 October 1583, Cardinal Carlo Borromeo declared the marriage of Margherita and Vincenzo annulled on the basis of the canonical rule, which allows the separation of the spouses, if within three years after the marriage their union remained without being consummated.

=== Service as Benedictine nun ===
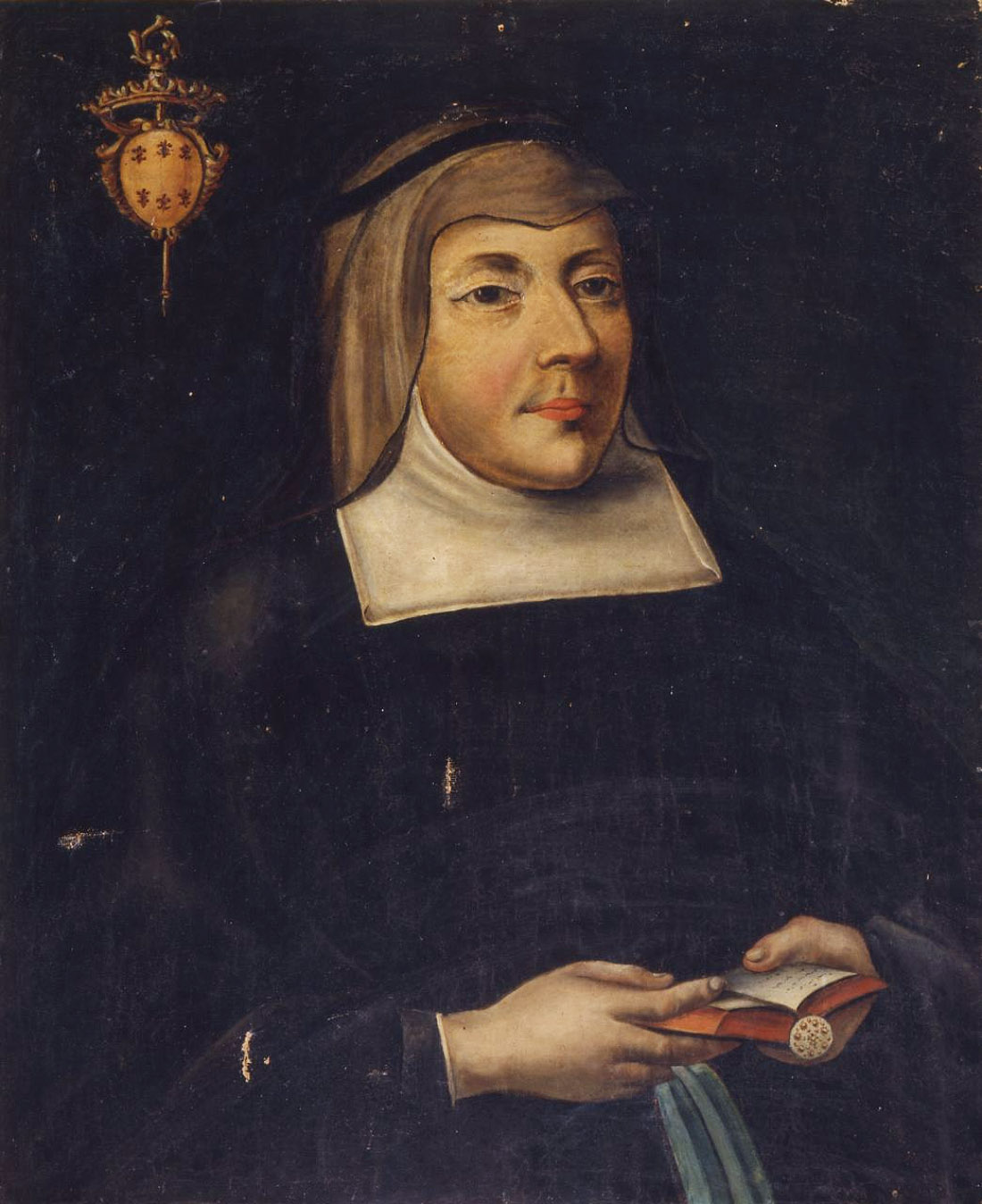
Margherita as Sister Maura Lucenia.

On 30 October 1583, Cardinal Carlo Borromeo veiled Margherita as a nun; she also adopted a new name - Sister Maura Lucenia. From the dowry of the former hereditary princess of Mantua, Duke Guglielmo withheld 100,000 ducats as compensation for the “fault” of his daughter-in-law. The House of Gonzaga returned jewelry and paid 12,000 scudi for the wardrobe that they donated to Margherita. Even before the official divorce, Duke Guglielmo of Mantua began negotiations with Francesco I de' Medici, Grand Duke of Tuscany for the marriage of his daughter Eleonora and Hereditary Prince Vincenzo. Before agreeing to the marriage, the House of Medici humiliated Margherita's ex-husband: Vincenzo had to prove his virility in front of witnesses by having sexual intercourse with a virgin maid. After that, on 28 April 1584, he entered into his second marriage.

Having become a nun, Margherita didn't abandon her passion for music. She secretly invited the young court musician Giulio Cima, nicknamed Giulino, to her cell. In June 1585, Duke Ottavio of Parma learned about these meetings, and ordered the musician arrested and interrogated. It turned out that the princess was having fun listening to secular music of a sentimental nature, which was unacceptable for a nun. Probably, there was an intimate relationship between her and the musician. To avoid the scandal, the duke of Parma has tightened the life conditions of his granddaughter in the monastery. These conditions didn't soften even after the accession to the ducal throne of Margherita's father in 1586; she was only allowed one visit per year. Her monthly allowance of 150,000 gold scudi was paid irregularly so that she couldn't use it to bribes in order to establish communication with her alleged lover, who was imprisoned at that time. From January 1586, she was also not paid the monthly 30 ducats bequeathed by her grandmother Margaret of Austria.

In December 1592, Margherita's brother Ranuccio I Farnese became in the new duke of Parma; he immediately transferred her to the monastery of Sant'Alessandro and hardened the conditions of her detention. In April 1595, Cardinal Odoardo Farnese, Margherita's younger brother, wrote to Duke Ranuccio I that the Pope intended to move their sister to a convent in Rome if the duke didn't change his attitude towards Margherita; only after this warning, and after it became known that Margherita wrote a letter to Pope Clement VIII, in which she asked the pontiff for protection, the Duke of Parma lessened the life conditions of his sister. In the following years, Margherita indirectly participated in the court life in Parma, speaking in defense of her two nephews, the illegitimate children of Duke Ranuccio I: a daughter, whom she accepted in her monastery and veiled into a nun with the name of Sister Maura Margherita, and Ottavio Farnese, whom she tried to rescue from the prison in which he was imprisoned by his own father because of his participation in a conspiracy. Another of her illegitimate nieces, Caterina, also entered in the monastery of Sant'Alessandro as a nun under her protection.

In 1616 she intervened, supported by financial aid offered by the devotees, in order to complete the Franciscan church of Santi Gervaso e Protaso, now dedicated to the Santissima Annunziata, according to the plans by Giambattista Fornovo.

Margherita was elected abbess of the monastery of Sant'Alessandro nine times, dying there on 13 April 1643 aged 75. At first, she was buried in the monastery grounds like the other nuns, until 14 December 1853, when Charles III, Duke of Parma ordered to transfer her remains to the Sanctuary of Santa Maria della Steccata and to bury her remains in the necropolis of the Farnese and Bourbon dynasties. The Margherita's tomb is located next to her father's; on the tombstone are carved the coat of arms of the House of Farnese and an epitaph with a summary of her life.

== In culture ==
- The story of the princess's marriage served as the basis for the 1965 film A Maiden for a Prince, with Vittorio Gassman, Virna Lisi and Anna Maria Guarnieri, who played Margherita.

== Ancestry ==
Ancestors of Margherita Farnese

8. Pier Luigi Farnese, Duke of Parma
4. Ottavio Farnese, Duke of Parma
9. Gerolama Orsini
2. Alessandro Farnese, Duke of Parma
10. Charles V, Holy Roman Emperor
5. Margaret of Parma
11. Johanna van der Gheynst
1. Margherita Farnese
12. Manuel I of Portugal
6. Edward, Duke of Guimarães
13. Maria of Aragon
3. Maria of Portugal
14. Jaime, Duke of Braganza
7. Isabel of Braganza
15. Leonor de Guzmán y Velasco

== Bibliography ==
- Chiusole, Antonio (1743). "La genealogia delle case più illustri di tutto il mondo" (in Italian). Venezia: Appresso Giambattista Recurti. p. 665.
- Giurleo, Francesca (2014). La famiglia Farnese (in Italian). Viterbo: Archeoares. p. 253. ISBN 9788896889473. ISBN 889-688-947-2 ISBN 978-8-89-688947-3
- Moscatelli, Giuseppe (2015). "Margherita Farnese, la sposa inviolata". giornale (in Italian). La Loggetta. p. 104.
