= Descendants of Manuel I of Portugal =

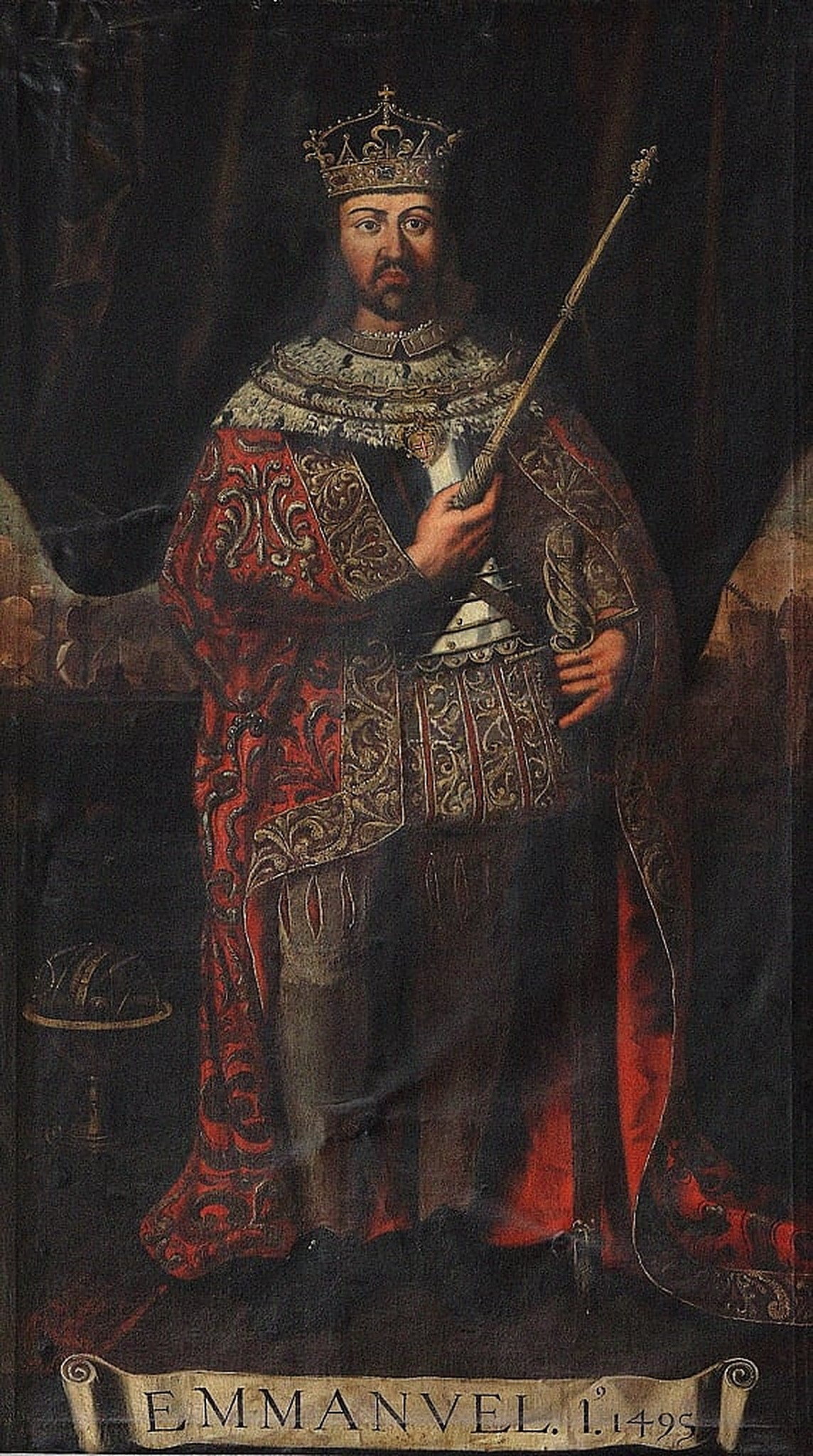
King Manuel I of Portugal and the Algarves.

The descendants of Manuel I of Portugal, of the House of Aviz, left a lasting mark on Portuguese history and royalty, and European history and royalty as a whole. Manuel married three times, each time providing children. He first married Isabella of Aragon, Princess of Asturias, followed by her sister, Maria of Aragon, and lastly their niece, Eleanor of Austria.

His descendants can be found in both reigning and non-reigning royal families all over Europe.

This article deals with the children of Manuel I and in turn their senior heirs.

== Background on Manuel I ==
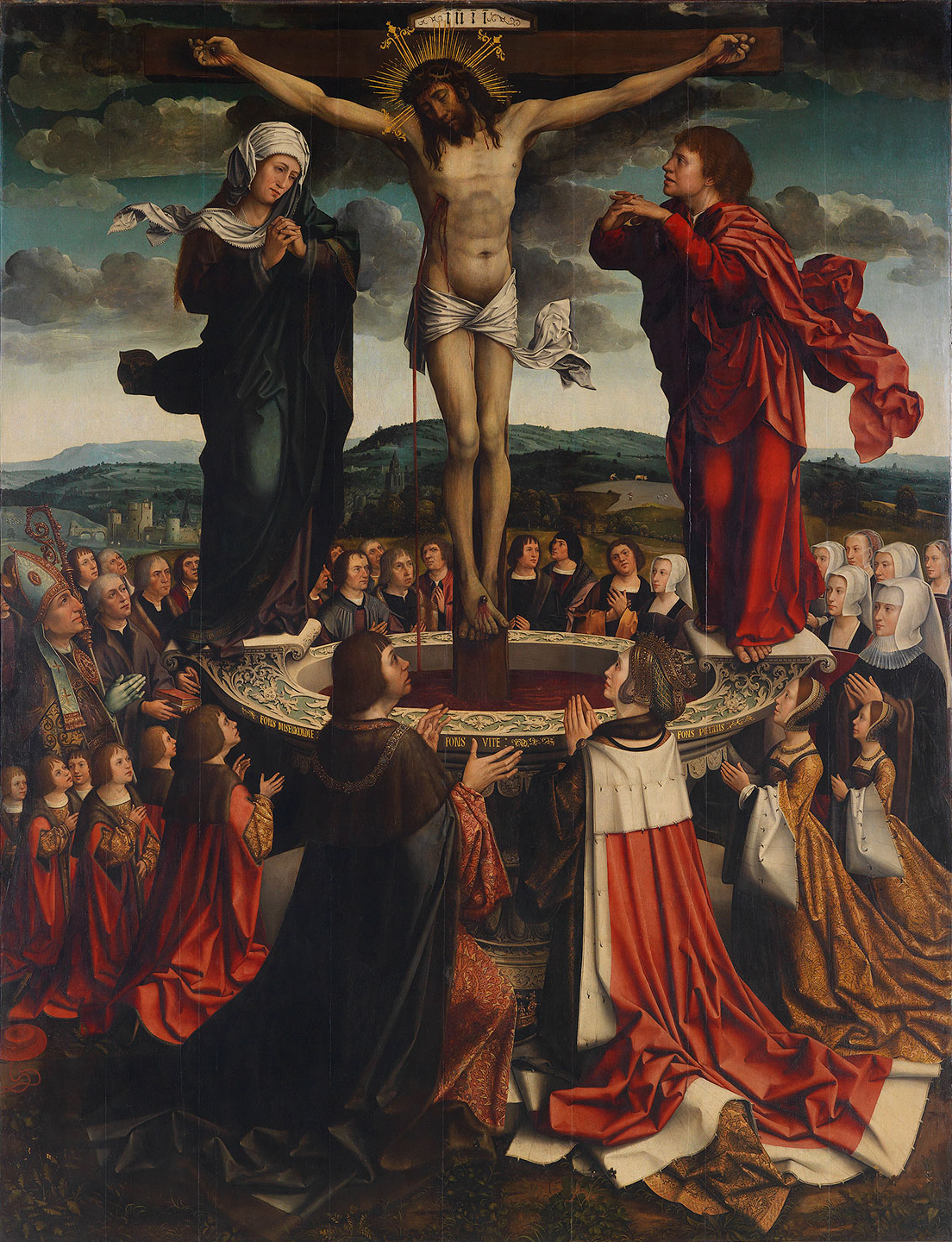
Family of D. Manuel I at the Fons Vitae; 1518

Manuel, born on 31 May 1469 at the Royal Palace at Alcochete, was the second son of Duke Ferdinand I of Viseu and Beja and Infanta Beatriz of Reguengos.

=== Throne of Portugal ===
During Manuel's youth, his cousin John II of Portugal was King. John II went through a large process trying to eliminate the powers and wealth of the Portuguese nobility, of which Manuel was a prominent part. John II had both Duke Diogo I of Viseu and Beja and Duke Fernando II of Braganza put on trial and executed. After Diogo's death, the Dukedoms of Viseu and Beja passed to Manuel, causing Manuel to fear for his own life.

In 1491, Afonso, Prince of Portugal was killed in a horse riding accident. John II only had one other child, Jorge, Duke of Coimbra, but he was illegitimate. After countless failed efforts to legitimize Jorge, John II finally sent a royal order to Manuel in 1493.

When Manuel heard a royal order was on its way to him, he worried that it might be a summons for a trial, likely resulting in execution. Upon receiving the order, however, he was relieved in hearing that he was made the heir to John II's throne.

John II died on 25 October 1495 and Manuel became monarch of Portugal. During his reign, Manuel expanded the Portuguese Empire, making it the most formidable power in all of Europe at the time.

Resulting from the establishment of a direct sea route to India during his reign, Manuel became enormously wealthy. As a result, he facilitated the construction of many notable, Manueline style architectural works throughout Portugal. This wealth made his children candidates for royal marriages across Europe.

Almost all of Manuel's descendants would become crucial in the Portuguese succession crisis of 1580, the Iberian Union, and later the Portuguese Restoration War, as all claims to the Portuguese throne during these events originated from descendancy from Manuel I.

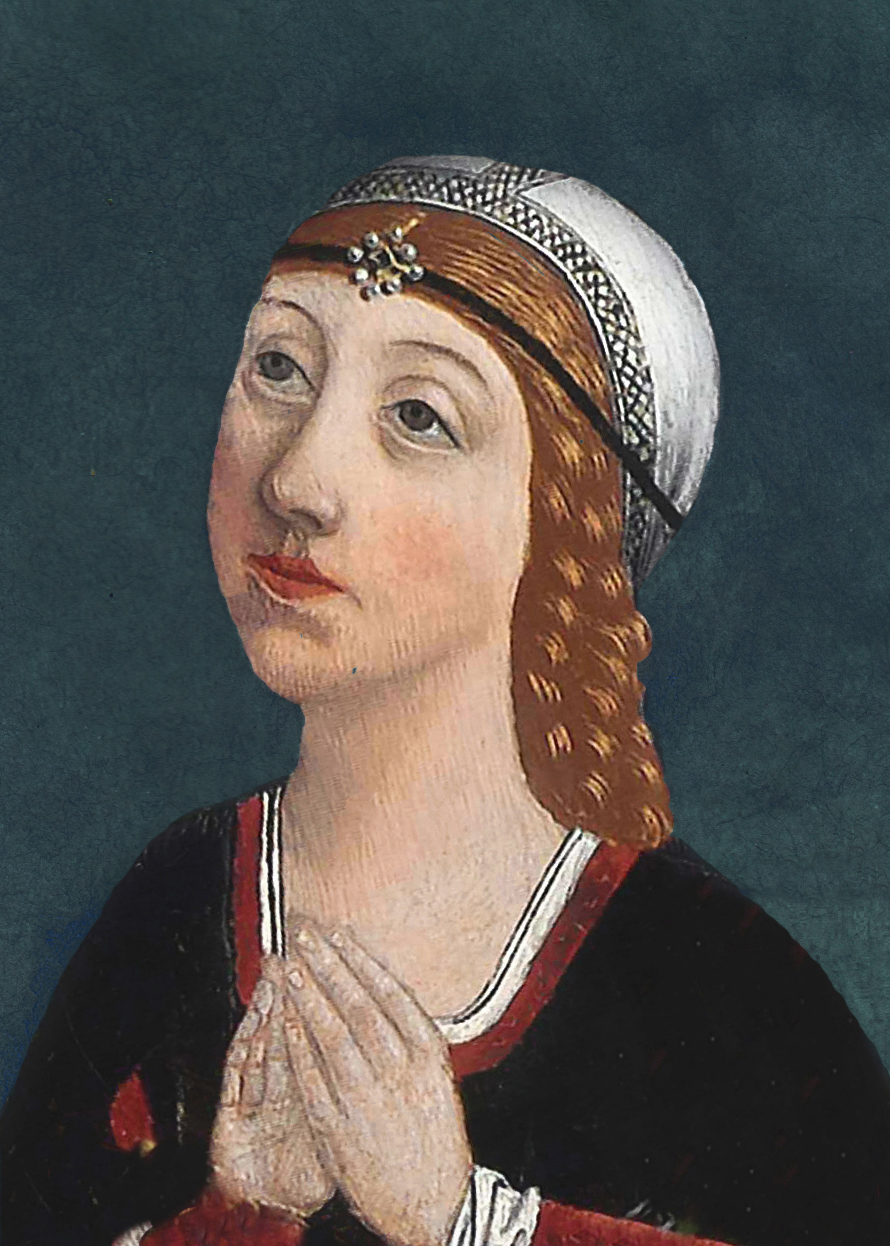
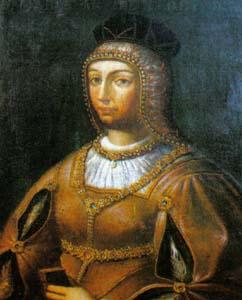
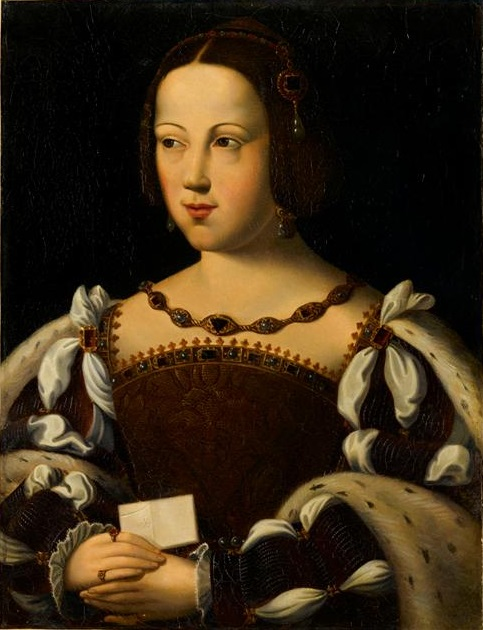
Manuel I's wives:Isabel of Aragon and Castile, Maria of Castile and Aragon, Eleanor of Austria

== Descendants by Isabel of Aragon and Castile ==
On 13 September 1497, Manuel I married Isabel of Aragon and Castile, Princess of Asturias. The couple had 1 child:

=== Miguel, Prince of Asturias and Portugal ===
| Descendant | Image | Birth | Marriages | Death |
|---|---|---|---|---|
| Miguel da Paz, Prince of Asturias and Portugal; 1498–1500 | | 23 August 1498; Zaragoza son of Manuel I and Isabella of Aragon and Castile | never married | 19 July 1500; Granada aged 1 |

== Descendants by Maria of Aragon and Castile ==
On 30 October 1501, Manuel I married Maria of Aragon and Castile. The couple had 8 children:

=== John III of Portugal ===
| Descendant | Image | Birth | Marriages | Death |
|---|---|---|---|---|
| John III of Portugal; 1502–1557 | | 7 June 1502; São Jorge Castle son of Manuel I and Maria of Aragon and Castile | Catherine of Austria; 10 February 1525; 7 children | 14 February 1557; Ribeira Palace aged 55 |
| Afonso, Prince of Portugal; 1526 | | 24 February 1526; Lisbon son of John III and Catherine of Austria | never married | 12 April 1526; Lisbon aged 2 months |
| João Manuel, Prince of Portugal; 1537–1554 | | 3 June 1537; Lisbon son of John III and Catherine of Austria | Joanna of Austria; 11 January 1552, 1 child | 2 January 1554; Lisbon aged 16 |
| Sebastian I of Portugal; 1554–1578 | | 20 January 1554; Ribeira Palace son of João Manuel, Prince of Portugal and Joanna of Austria | never married | 4 August 1578; Alcácer-Quibir aged 24 |

=== Infanta Isabel of Portugal ===
| Descendant | Image | Birth | Marriages | Death |
|---|---|---|---|---|
| Infanta Isabel; 1503–1539 | | 24 October 1503; Lisbon daughter of Manuel I and Maria of Aragon and Castile | Charles V, Holy Roman Emperor; 10 March 1526; 5 children | 1 May 1539; Toledo aged 35 |
| Philip I of Portugal, II of Spain; 1527–1598 | | 21 May 1527; Valladolid son of Isabella of Portugal and Charles V, Holy Roman Emperor | Maria Manuel of Portugal; 14 November 1543; 1 child Mary I of England; 25 July 1554 no children Elisabeth of Valois; 22 June 1559; 2 children Anna of Austria; 24 January 1570; 4 children | 13 September 1598; El Escorial aged 71 |
| Carlos, Prince of Asturias; 1545–1568 | | 8 July 1545; Valladolid son of Philip I of Portugal, II of Spain and Maria Manuel of Portugal | never married | 24 July 1568; Madrid aged 23 |
| Philip II of Portugal, III of Spain; 1578–1621 | | 14 April 1578; Madrid son of Philip I of Portugal, II of Spain and Anna of Austria | Margaret of Austria; 18 April 1599; 8 children | 31 March 1621; Madrid aged 42 |
| Philip III of Portugal, IV of Spain; 1605–1665 | | 8 April 1605; Valladolid son of Philip II of Portugal, III of Spain and Margaret of Austria | Elisabeth of France; 25 November 1615; 7 children Mariana of Austria; 7 Octobre 1649; 5 children | 17 September 1665; Madrid aged 60 |
| Baltasar Carlos, Prince of Asturias and Portugal; 1629–1646 | | 17 October 1629; Madrid son of Philip III of Portugal, IV of Spain and Elisabeth of France | never married | 9 October 1646; Zaragoza aged 16 |
| Philip Prospero, Prince of Asturias; 1657–1661 | | November 28, 1657; Madrid son of Philip III of Portugal, IV of Spain and Mariana of Austria | never married | November 1, 1661; Madrid aged 3 |
| Charles II of Spain; 1661–1700 | | 6 November 1661; Madrid son of Philip III of Portugal, IV of Spain and Mariana of Austria | Marie Louise of Orléans; 30 August 1679 no children Maria Anna of Neuburg; 28 August 1689 no children | 1 November 1700; Madrid aged 38 |
| John of Austria; 1629–1679 | | 7 April 1629; Madrid son of Philip III of Portugal, IV of Spain and María Calderón | never married | 17 September 1679; Madrid aged 50 |
| Maria Theresa of Spain; 1638–1683 | | 10 September 1638; Madrid daughter of Philip III of Portugal, IV of Spain and Elisabeth of France | Louis XIV of France; 9 June 1660; 6 children | 30 July 1683; Versailles aged 44 |
| Louis, Dauphin of France; 1661–1711 | | 1 November 1661; Fontainebleau son of Maria Theresa of Spain and Louis XIV of France | Maria Anna of Bavaria; 28 January 1680; 3 children Marie Émilie of Choin; 1695 no children | 14 April 1711; Meudon aged 49 |
| Louis, Duke of Burgundy; 1682–1712 | | 16 August 1682; Versailles son of Louis, Dauphin of France and Maria Anna of Bavaria | Marie Adélaïde of Savoy; 6 December 1697; 3 children | 18 February 1712; Marly-le-Roi aged 29 |
| Louis, Duke of Brittany; 1707–1712 | | 8 January 1707; Versailles son of Louis, Duke of Burgundy and Marie Adélaïde of Savoy | never married | 8 March 1712; Versailles aged 5 |
| Louis XV of France; 1710–1774 | | 15 February 1710; Versailles son of Louis, Duke of Burgundy and Marie Adélaïde of Savoy | Marie Leszczyńska; 5 September 1725; 10 children | 10 May 1774; Versailles aged 64 |
| Louis, Dauphin of France; 1729–1765 | | 4 September 1729; Versailles son of Louis XV and Marie Leszczyńska | Maria Teresa of Spain; 18 December 1744; 1 child Maria Josepha of Saxony; 9 February 1747; 8 children | 20 December 1765; Fontainebleau aged 36 |
| Louis XVI of France; 1754–1793 | | 23 August 1754; Versailles son of Louis, Dauphin of France and Maria Josepha of Saxony | Marie Antoinette of Austria; 16 May 1770; 4 children | 21 January 1793; Paris aged 38 |
| Louis, Dauphin of France; 1781–1789 | | 22 October 1781; Versailles son of Louis XVI and Marie Antoinette of Austria | never married | 4 June 1789; Meudon aged 7 |
| Louis XVII of France; 1785–1795 | | 27 March 1785; Versailles son of Louis XVI and Marie Antoinette of Austria | never married | 8 June 1795; Paris aged 10 |
| Marie Thérèse of France; 1778–1851 | | 19 December 1778; Versailles daughter of Louis XVI and Marie Antoinette of Austria | Louis, Duke of Angoulême; 10 June 1799 no children | 19 October 1851; Nova Gorica aged 72 |

=== Infanta Beatriz of Portugal ===
| Descendant | Image | Birth | Marriages | Death |
|---|---|---|---|---|
| Infanta Beatriz of Portugal; 1504–1538 | | 31 December 1504; Lisbon daughter of Manuel I and Maria of Aragon and Castile | Charles III, Duke of Savoy; 29 September 1521; 1 child | January 8, 1538; Nice aged 33 |
| Emmanuel Philibert, Duke of Savoy; 1528–1580 | | 8 July 1528; Chambéry son of Beatrice of Portugal and Charles III, Duke of Savoy | Margaret of France, Duchess of Berry; 10 July 1559; 1 child | 30 August 1580; Turin aged 52 |
| Charles Emmanuel I, Duke of Savoy; 1562–1630 | | 12 January 1562; Castle of Rivoli son of Emmanuel Philibert, Duke of Savoy and Margaret of France, Duchess of Berry | Catalina Micaela of Spain; 18 March 1585; 10 children | 30 August 1580; Savigliano aged 68 |
| Victor Amadeus I, Duke of Savoy; 1587–1637 | | 8 May 1587; Turin son of Charles Emmanuel I, Duke of Savoy and Infanta Catherine Michelle of Spain | Christine Marie of France; 10 February 1619; 7 children | 7 October 1637; Turin aged 50 |
| Francis Hyacinth, Duke of Savoy; 1632–1638 | | 14 September 1632; Castello del Valentino son of Victor Amadeus I, Duke of Savoy and Christine Marie of France | never married | 4 October 1638; Castello del Valentino aged 6 |
| Charles Emmanuel II, Duke of Savoy; 1634–1675 | | 20 June 1634; Turin son of Victor Amadeus I, Duke of Savoy and Christine Marie of France | Françoise Madeleine d'Orléans; 4 March 1663 no children Marie Jeanne of Savoy; 10 May 1665; 1 child | 12 June 1675; Turin aged 40 |
| Victor Amadeus II of Sardinia; 1666–1732 | | 14 May 1666; Turin son of Charles Emmanuel II, Duke of Savoy and Marie Jeanne of Savoy | Anne Marie d'Orléans; 10 April 1684; 6 children Anna Canalis di Cumiana; 12 August 1730; 1 child | 31 October 1732; Turin aged 66 |
| Charles Emmanuel III of Sardinia; 1701–1773 | | 27 April 1701; Turin son of Victor Amadeus II of Sardinia and Anne Marie d'Orléans | Countess Palatine Anne Christine of Sulzbach; 15 March 1722; 1 child Elisabeth Therese of Lorraine; 5 March 1737; 1 child Polyxena of Hesse-Rotenburg; 23 July 1724; 6 children | 20 February 1773; Turin aged 71 |
| Victor Amadeus III of Sardinia; 1726–1796 | | 26 June 1726; Turin son of Charles Emmanuel III of Sardinia and Polyxena of Hesse-Rotenburg | Maria Antonia Ferdinanda of Spain; 12 April 1750; 9 children | 16 October 1796; Turin aged 70 |
| Charles Emmanuel IV of Sardinia; 1751–1819 | | 24 May 1751; Turin son of Victor Amadeus III of Sardinia and Maria Antonia Ferdinanda of Spain | Marie Clotilde of France; 27 August 1775; 1 child | 6 October 1819; Rome aged 68 |
| Victor Emmanuel I of Sardinia; 1759–1824 | | 24 July 1759; Turin son of Victor Amadeus III of Sardinia and Maria Antonia Ferdinanda of Spain | Maria Theresa of Austria-Este; 25 April 1789; 4 children | 10 January 1824; Turin aged 64 |
| Princess Maria Beatrice of Savoy; 1792–1840 | | 6 December 1792 daughter of Victor Emmanuel I of Sardinia and Archduchess Maria Teresa of Austria-Este | Francis IV, Duke of Modena; 20 June 1812; 4 children | 15 September 1840 aged 48 |
| Francis V, Duke of Modena; 1819–1875 | | 1 June 1819; Modena son of Princess Maria Beatrice of Savoy and Francis IV, Duke of Modena | Princess Adelgunde of Bavaria; 30 March 1842; 1 child | 20 November 1875; Vienna aged 56 |
| Archduke Ferdinand Karl Viktor of Austria-Este; 1821–1849 | | 20 July 1821; Modena son of Princess Maria Beatrice of Savoy and Francis IV, Duke of Modena | Archduchess Elisabeth Franziska of Austria; 4 December 1846; 1 child | 15 December 1849; Brno aged 28 |
| Maria Theresia of Austria-Este; 1849–1919 | | 2 July 1849; Brno daughter of Ferdinand of Austria-Este and Archduchess Elisabeth Franziska of Austria | Ludwig III of Bavaria; 13 children | 7 November 1919; Chiemgau aged 69 |
| Rupprecht, Crown Prince of Bavaria; 1869–1955 | | 18 May 1869; Munich son of Archduchess Maria Theresia of Austria-Este and Ludwig III of Bavaria | Maria Gabrielle in Bavaria; 10 July 1900; 4 children Princess Antonia of Luxembourg; 7 April 1921; 6 children | 2 August 1955; Schloß Leutstetten aged 86 |
| Albrecht, Duke of Bavaria; 1905–1996 | | 3 May 1905; Munich son of Rupprecht, Crown Prince of Bavaria and Maria Gabrielle in Bavaria | Countess Maria Draskovich von Trakostjan; 1930; 4 children Countess Marie-Jenke Keglevich von Buzin; 1971; No children | 8 July 1996; Castle Berg aged 91 |
| Franz, Duke of Bavaria; 1933–present | Franz | 14 July 1933; Munich son of Albrecht, Duke of Bavaria and Countess Maria Draskovich von Traskotjan | not married | |

=== Infante Luís, Duke of Beja ===
| Descendant | Image | Birth | Marriages | Death |
|---|---|---|---|---|
| Infante Luís, Duke of Beja; 1506–1555 | | 3 March 1506; Abrantes son of Manuel I and Maria of Aragon and Castile | Violante Gomes; March 3, 1531; 3 children | 27 November 1555; Lisbon aged 49 |
| António, Prior of Crato (António I of Portugal); 1531–1595 | | 1531; Lisbon son of Infante Louis, Duke of Beja and Violante Gomes | Ana Barbosa; 10 children | 26 August 1595; Paris aged 64 |
| Manuel, Prince of Portugal; 1568–1638 | | 1568; Tangiers son of António, Prior of Crato and Ana Barbosa | Countess Emilia of Nassau; 17 November 1597; 9 children Luisa Osorio; 3 April 1630 no issue | 22 June 1638; Brussels aged 70 |
| Manuel António of Portugal; 1600–1666 | | 11 February 1600; Delft son of Manuel, Prince of Portugal and Emilia of Nassau | Countess Johanna of Hanau-Münzenberg; 11 July 1646; 4 children | 27 October 1666; Schagen aged 66 |
| Isabel Maria of Portugal; 1648–1717 | | 20 November 1648; Delft daughter of Manuel António of Portugal and Johanna of Hanau-Münzenberg | Baron Adrian van Gendt; 11 April 1678; 9 children | 15 October 1717; Vianen aged 69 |

=== Infante Fernando, Duke of Guarda and Trancoso ===
| Descendant | Image | Birth | Marriages | Death |
|---|---|---|---|---|
| Infante Fernando, Duke of Guarda and Trancoso; 1507–1534 | | 5 June 1507; Abrantes son of Manuel I and Maria of Aragon and Castile | Guiomar, Countess of Loulé and Marialva; 1530; 2 children | 7 November 1534; Abrantes aged 27 |

=== Cardinal-Infante Afonso of Portugal ===
| Descendant | Image | Birth | Marriages | Death |
|---|---|---|---|---|
| Cardinal-Infante Afonso of Portugal; 1509–1544 | | April 23, 1509; Évora son of Manuel I and Maria of Aragon and Castile | never married | April 21, 1540; Lisbon aged 35 |

=== Henrique I of Portugal ===
| Descendant | Image | Birth | Marriages | Death |
|---|---|---|---|---|
| Henrique I of Portugal; 1512–1580 | | 31 January 1512; Lisbon son of Manuel I and Maria of Aragon and Castile | never married | 31 January 1580; Almeirim aged 68 |

=== Infante Duarte I, Duke of Guimarães ===
| Descendant | Image | Birth | Marriages | Death |
|---|---|---|---|---|
| Infante Duarte I, Duke of Guimarães; 1515–1540 | | October 7, 1515; Lisbon son of Manuel I and Maria of Aragon and Castile | Isabel of Braganza; 1537; 3 children | September 20, 1540; Lisbon aged 24 |
| Infante Duarte II, Duke of Guimarães; 1542–1576 | | March 1541; Almeirim son of Infante Duarte I, Duke of Guimarães I and Isabel of Braganza | never married | 28 November 1576; Évora aged 34 |
| Maria of Guimarães; 1538–1577 | | 12 August 1538; Ribeira Palace daughter of Infante Duarte I, Duke of Guimarães I and Isabel of Braganza | Alexander Farnese, Duke of Parma; 11 November 1565; 3 children | 7 September 1577; Parma aged 39 |
| Ranuccio I Farnese, Duke of Parma; 1569–1622 | | 28 March 1569; Parma son of Maria of Guimarães and Alexander Farnese, Duke of Parma | Margherita Aldobrandini; 7 May 1600; 5 children | 5 March 1622; Parma aged 52 |
| Odoardo Farnese, Duke of Parma; 1612–1646 | | 28 April 1612; Parma son of Ranuccio I Farnese, Duke of Parma and Margherita Aldobrandini | Margherita de' Medici; 11 October 1628; 4 children | 11 September 1646; Parma aged 34 |
| Ranuccio II Farnese, Duke of Parma; 1630–1694 | | 17 September 1630; Parma son of Odoardo Farnese, Duke of Parma and Margherita de' Medici | Princess Margaret Yolande of Savoy; 29 April 1660; 2 children Isabella d'Este; 18 February 1664; 3 children Maria d'Este; 1 October 1668; 9 children | 11 December 1694; Parma aged 64 |
| Odoardo Farnese, Hereditary Prince of Parma; 1666–1693 | | 12 August 1666; Parma son of Ranuccio II Farnese, Duke of Parma and Isabella d'Este | Countess Palatine Dorothea Sophie of Neuburg; 3 April 1690 two children | 6 September 1693; Parma aged 27 |
| Elisabeth Farnese; 1692–1766 | | 25 October 1692; Parma daughter of Odoardo Farnese, Hereditary Prince of Parma and Dorothea Sophie of Neuburg | Philip V of Spain; 24 December 1714; 7 children | 11 July 1766; Aranjuez aged 73 |
| Charles III of Spain; 1716–1788 | Charles VI | 20 January 1716; Madrid son of Elisabeth Farnese and Philip V of Spain | Maria Amalia of Saxony; 1738; 13 children | 14 December 1788; Madrid aged 72 |
| Charles IV of Spain; 1748–1819 | | 11 November 1748; Portici son of Charles III of Spain and Maria Amalia of Saxony | Maria Luisa of Parma; 10 October 1846; 14 children | 20 January 1819; Paris aged 70 |
| Ferdinand VII of Spain; 1784–1833 | | 14 October 1784; El Escorial son of Charles IV of Spain and Maria Luisa of Parma | Maria Antonia of the Two Sicilies; 4 October 1802; No children Maria Isabel of Portugal; 1816; 1 child Maria Josepha Amalia of Saxony; 20 October 1819; No children Maria Christina of the Two Sicilies; 11 December 1829; 2 children | 29 September 1833; Madrid aged 48 |
| Isabella II of Spain; 1830–1904 | | 10 October 1830; Madrid daughter of Ferdinand VII of Spain and Maria Christina of the Two Sicilies | Francis of Spain; 10 October 1846; 12 children | 10 April 1904; Paris aged 73 |
| Alfonso XII of Spain; 1857–1885 | | 28 November 1857; Madrid son of Isabella II of Spain and Francis, Duke of Cádiz | Mercedes of Orléans; 23 January 1878; No children Maria Christina of Austria; 29 November 1879; 3 children | 25 November 1885; El Pardo aged 27 |
| Alfonso XIII of Spain; 1886–1941 | | 17 May 1886; Madrid son of Alfonso XII of Spain and Maria Christina of Austria | Victoria Eugenie of Battenberg; 31 May 1906; 7 children | 28 February 1941; Rome aged 54 |
| Infante Jaime, Duke of Segovia; 1908–1975 | | 23 June 1908; Segovia son of Alfonso XIII of Spain and Victoria Eugenie of Battenberg | Emmanuelle de Dampierre; 4 March 1935; 2 children | 20 March 1975; St. Gallen aged 67 |
| Alfonso, Duke of Cádiz; 1936–1989 | | 20 April 1936; Rome son of Infante Jaime, Duke of Segovia and Emmanuelle de Dampierre | María del Carmen Martínez-Bordiú y Franco; 8 March 1972; 2 children | 30 January 1989; Beaver Creek aged 53 |
| Louis Alphonse, Duke of Anjou; 1974–present | | 25 April 1974; Madrid son of Alfonso, Duke of Anjou and Cádiz and María del Carmen Martínez-Bordiú y Franco | Maria Margarita, Duchess of Anjou; 5 November 2004; 3 children | |

== Descendants by Eleanor of Austria ==
On 16 July 1518, Manuel I married Eleanor of Austria. The couple had 2 children:

=== Infante Carlos ===
| Descendant | Image | Birth | Marriages | Death |
|---|---|---|---|---|
| Infante Carlos; 1520–1521 | | 18 February 1520; Lisbon son of Manuel I and Eleanor of Austria | never married | 14 April 1521; Lisbon aged 1 |

=== Infanta Maria, Duchess of Viseu ===
| Descendant | Image | Birth | Marriages | Death |
|---|---|---|---|---|
| Infanta Maria, Duchess of Viseu; 1521–1577 | | 6 June 1521; Lisbon daughter of Manuel I and Eleanor of Austria | never married | 10 October 1577; Lisbon aged 58 |

== See also ==
- Descendants of Miguel I of Portugal
- Descendants of John VI of Portugal
