= War of the Portuguese Succession =

European conflict from 1580 to 1583

- Part of the Portuguese succession crisis of 1580
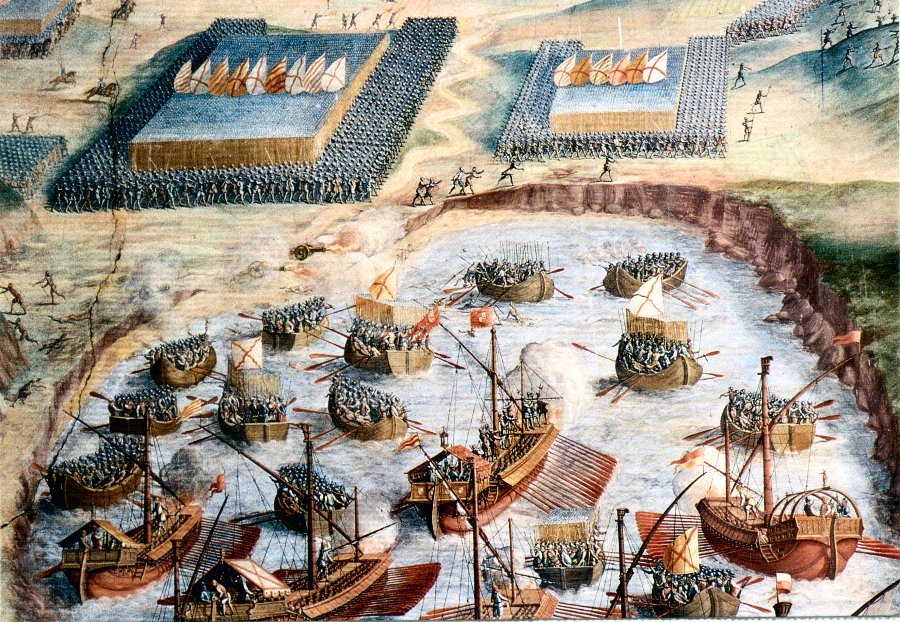
- Habsburg tercios landing at the Battle of Ponta Delgada
Date	1580–1583
Location	Portugal, Atlantic Ocean, and the Azores Islands
Result	Victory for Phillip II
Territorial changes	Establishment of the Iberian Union

Belligerents
Spain; Pro-Philip Portugal	Pro-Crato Portugal; France; England

Commanders and leaders
(Spain) Philip II; (Spain) Duke of Alba; (Spain) Sancho d'Avila (DOW); (Spain) Álvaro de Bazán; (Portugal) Duke of Braganza	(Portugal) Prior of Crato; (Portugal) Count of Vimioso; (Kingdom of France) Henry III of France; (Kingdom of France) Piero Strozzi (executed); (Kingdom of England) Francis Drake; (Kingdom of England) Francis Walsingham; (Kingdom of England) Charles Howard

The War of the Portuguese Succession, a result of the impending extinction of the Portuguese royal line after the Battle of Alcácer Quibir and the ensuing Portuguese succession crisis of 1580, was fought from 1580 to 1583 between the two main claimants to the Portuguese throne: António, Prior of Crato, proclaimed in several towns as King of Portugal, and his first cousin Philip II of Spain, who eventually succeeded in claiming the crown, reigning as Philip I of Portugal.

== Cardinal-King ==
The Cardinal Henry, great-uncle of Sebastian I of Portugal, became ruler in the immediate wake of Sebastian's death. Henry had served as regent for Sebastian after 1557, and succeeded him as King after the disastrous Battle of Alcácer Quibir in 1578. Henry renounced his clerical offices and sought to take a bride for the continuation of the Aviz dynasty, but Pope Gregory XIII, affiliated with the Habsburgs, did not release him from his vows. The Cardinal-King died two years later, without having appointed a Council of Regency to choose a successor.

== Claimants to the throne ==
Portuguese nobility was worried about the maintenance of their independence and sought help to find a new King. By this time the Portuguese throne was disputed by several claimants; among them were Catherine, Duchess of Braganza (1540–1614), her nephew Ranuccio I Farnese, Duke of Parma, Philip II of Spain, and António, Prior of Crato. The Duchess was later acknowledged by the Habsburgs as the legitimate heir, after her descendants obtained the throne in 1640 (in the person of John IV of Portugal), but at that time, she was only one of several possible heirs. According to the feudal custom, her late older sister's son Ranuccio, an Italian, was the closest heir, then the Duchess herself, and only after them, King Philip. Philip II of Spain was a foreigner (although his mother was Portuguese) and descended from Manuel I by a female line; as for António, although he was Manuel I's grandson in the male line, he was an illegitimate grandson.

Ranuccio Farnese (1569–1622), the hereditary Duke of Parma and Piacenza, was the son of the late elder daughter of Duarte of Portugal, Duke of Guimarães, the only son of Manuel I whose legitimate descendants survived at that time, Ranuccio was according to the feudal custom the first heir to the throne of Portugal. He was the son of Don Alexander Farnese, Duke of Parma and Piacenza and of Maria of Portugal. His great-uncle Henry I of Portugal's death triggered the struggle for the throne of Portugal when Ranuccio was 11 years old. However, his father was an ally and even a subject of the Spanish King, another contender, so Ranuccio's rights were not forcibly claimed at that time. Ranuccio became reigning Duke of Parma in 1592.

Instead, Ranuccio's aunt Catherine, Duchess of Braganza, claimed the throne but failed. Catherine, Duchess of Braganza was married to Duke John I of Braganza (descendant in male line from Afonso, 1st Duke of Braganza, an illegitimate son of John I of Portugal), who himself was grandson of the late Duke James of Braganza, also a legitimate heir of Portugal, being the son of infanta Isabella of Portugal, sister of Manuel I and daughter of infante Ferdinand, Duke of Viseu, second son of King Duarte I. The Duchess also had a son, Dom Teodósio of Braganza, who would be her royal heir and successor to the throne. The Duchess's claim was relatively strong, as it was reinforced by her husband's position as one of the legitimate heirs; thus they would both be entitled to hold the Kingship. Moreover, the Duchess was living in Portugal, not abroad, and was not underage, but 40 years old. Her weaknesses were her sex (Portugal had not had a generally recognized reigning queen) and her being the second daughter, there thus existed a genealogically senior claimant.

Coat of Arms of Philip II of Spain as King of Portugal.

According to the old feudal custom, the line of succession of the Portuguese throne would have been:

- Ranuccio I Farnese, Duke of Parma and his siblings (son of Infanta Maria of Guimarães, eldest daughter of Infante Duarte, Duke of Guimarães, the youngest son of Manuel I and the only one who had living descendants).
- Catherine, Duchess of Braganza and her children (youngest daughter of Duarte of Portugal, Maria's younger sister).
- Philip II of Spain and his children (son of Isabella of Portugal, the eldest daughter of Manuel I).
- Maria of Spain, Holy Roman Empress, and her children (daughter of Isabella of Portugal, Philip's sister).
- Emmanuel Philibert, Duke of Savoy and his children (son of Beatrice of Portugal, the youngest daughter of Manuel I).
- John I of Braganza and children (great-grandson of Isabella of Portugal, Manuel I's younger sister and married to Catherine).

== Succession ==
Both António and Philip were the grandchildren of King Manuel I of Portugal :

- António was known for having wider support in Portugal and throughout the nascent Portuguese Empire. This was in part due to his lifetime in Portugal. However he was a claimant through a bastard line (an illegitimate grandchild through his father Infante Louis, 5th Duke of Beja).
- Philip, in contrast, was the eldest grandchild, but he descended from a legitimate (albeit female) line, through his mother, Infanta Isabella of Portugal. Although he spent most of his life in Spain, the Portuguese high nobility and high clergy supported Philip of Spain's claim.

== War ==
On July 24, 1580, António proclaimed himself as King of Portugal and of the Algarves, in Santarém, which was followed by popular acclamation in several locations of the country. However, he governed in Continental Portugal for only 33 days, culminating in his defeat at the Battle of Alcântara by the Spanish armies led by Fernando Álvarez de Toledo, Duke of Alba on August 25. The Battle ended in a decisive victory for the Spanish Habsburgs, both on land and sea. Two days later, the Duke of Alba captured Lisbon.

In early 1581, António fled to France and, as Philip's armies had not yet occupied the Azores, he sailed there with French adventurers under Filippo Strozzi, a Florentine exile in the service of France, but was utterly defeated at sea by a Spanish fleet commanded by Don Álvaro de Bazán, 1st Marquis of Santa Cruz at the Battle of Ponta Delgada off Terceira Island on July 26, 1582 and off São Miguel Island on July 27, 1582. António's attempt to rule Portugal from Terceira Island, in the Azores (where he even minted coins) came to an end in 1583.

== Consequences ==
The combined Spanish-Portuguese navy's victory resulted in the rapid conquest of the Azores, completing the dynastic union of the Portuguese and Spanish empires. The King Philip II of Spain was recognized as King Philip I of Portugal and of the Algarves by the Portuguese Cortes of Tomar (1581). In 1589, António made an attempt on Lisbon supported by English forces under the command of Sir Francis Drake and Sir John Norreys. When the people failed to rise and yield the city to Dom António, the attempt was abandoned. Spain and Portugal would remain united in a dynastic union of the crowns (remaining formally independent and with autonomous administrations) for the next 60 years, until 1640. This union is called the Iberian Union.
