= Odoardo Farnese (cardinal) =

Italian nobleman and Catholic Cardinal

His Eminence Odoardo Farnese
- Cardinal-Bishop of Frascati
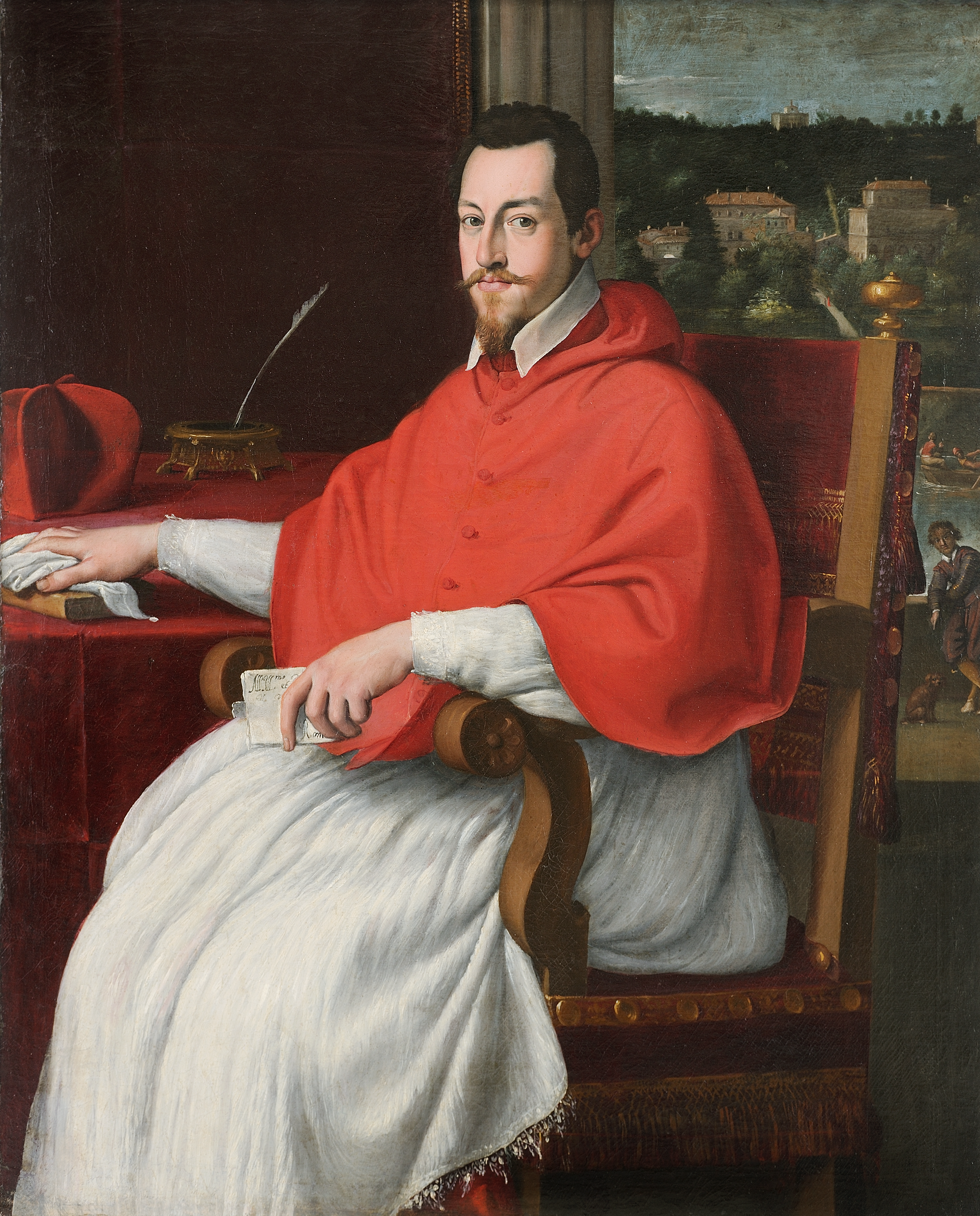
- Portrait by Domenichino, c. 1602-03
- Church: Catholic Church
- Appointed: 27 September 1623
- Term ended: 21 February 1626
- Predecessor: Francesco Sforza
- Successor: Giovanni Battista Deti
- Previous posts: Cardinal-Deacon of Sant'Adriano al Foro (1591–1595); Cardinal-Deacon of Sant'Eustachio (1595–1617); Cardinal-Bishop of Sabina (1621–1623)

Orders
- Consecration: 2 July 1621 by Robert Bellarmine
- Created cardinal: 6 March 1591 by Pope Gregory XIV
- Rank: Cardinal-Bishop

Personal details
- Born: 6 December 1573 Rome, Papal States
- Died: 21 February 1626 (aged 52) Parma, Duchy of Parma
- Parents: Alessandro Farnese, Duke of Parma (Father); Maria of Portugal (Mother)

Odoardo Farnese (6 December 1573 – 21 February 1626) was an Italian nobleman, the second son of Alessandro Farnese, Duke of Parma and Maria of Portugal, known for his patronage of the arts. He became a Cardinal of the Catholic Church in 1591, and briefly acted as regent of the Duchy of Parma and Piacenza for his nephew Odoardo from 1622 to 1626.

Cardinal Odoardo is probably best known today for commissioning the Bolognese artist Annibale Carracci to fresco the Camerino in the Palazzo Farnese in Rome. Carracci undertook this from 1595 to 1597, just prior to starting his decoration of the more famous and elaborate Farnese Gallery in the same palace. It was on Carracci's recommendation that Farnese commissioned Domenichino for the Chapel of St Nilo in the abbey at Badia di Grottaferrata, of which both architecture and fresco's were executed 1608-1610. The cardinal also commissioned the decoration of the Camerino degli Eremiti in the Palazzetto Farnese to Giovanni Lanfranco. This artificial hermitage was decorated ca. 1616-1617 and served both the devotional practice of the cardinal, and provided him a private way of participating in the activities of the Archconfraternity of the Orazione e Morte of which he was cardinal protector.

== The Camerino ==
The Camerino was Farnese's private study. The subject of the central scene in the ceiling is The Choice of Hercules. The scene is surrounded by a painted frame, an example of quadro riportato, which gives the illusion of a framed oil painting hung on the ceiling when in reality both the scene and its frame were frescoed. This quadro riportato device was brought to fruition by Carracci in the Farnese Gallery a few years later.

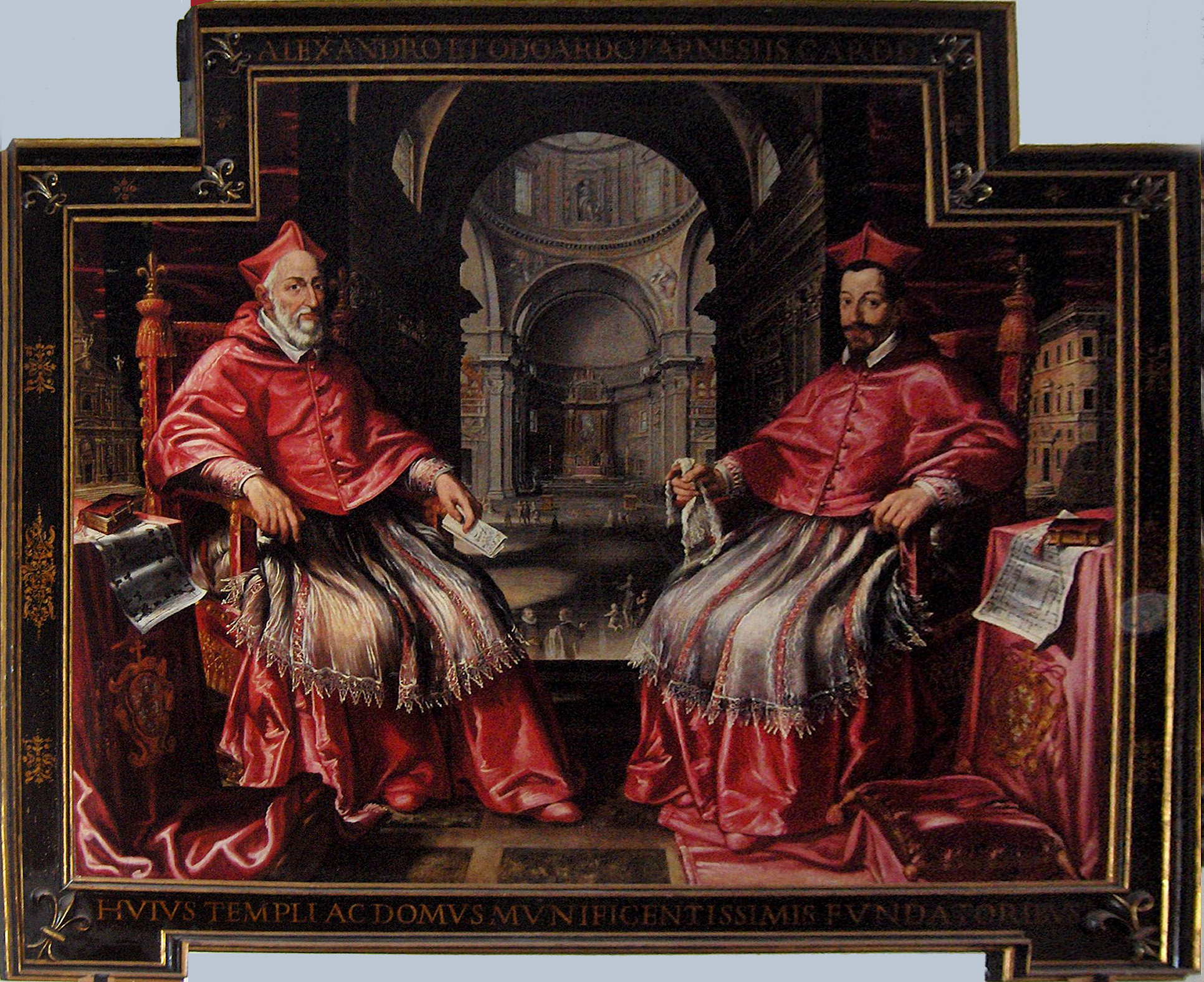
Cardinals Alessandro and Odoardo Farnese

In addition, Farnese commissioned various oil paintings from Carracci, including his Rinaldo and Armida now in the Capodimonte Museum in Naples and Christ in Glory with Saints and Odoardo Farnese now in the Galleria Palatina in Florence. Farnese also commissioned Carracci's Sleeping Venus.

His patronage of architecture was less extensive but included the Casa Professa, the Jesuit house adjacent to the church of the Gesu in Rome, by the architect Girolamo Rainaldi.

== Ancestry ==
Ancestors of Odoardo Farnese (cardinal)

8. Pier Luigi Farnese, Duke of Parma
4. Ottavio Farnese, Duke of Parma
9. Girolama Orsini
2. Alexander Farnese, Duke of Parma
10. Charles V, Holy Roman Emperor
5. Margaret of Parma
11. Johanna Maria van der Gheynst
1. Cardinal Odoardo Farnese
12. Manuel I of Portugal
6. Duarte, Duke of Guimarães
13. Maria of Aragon
3. Maria of Portugal
14. Jaime I, Duke of Braganza
7. Isabel of Braganza
15. Leonor de Guzmán y Velasco

== Bibliography ==
- van Gastel, Joris (2013). Il Marmo Spirante: Sculpture and Experience in Seventeenth-Century Rome. Walter de Gruyter. ISBN 978-3050059488.
- Denunzio, Antonio Ernesto (2009). "Nuove proposte per il cardinale Odoardo Farnese collezionista e mecenate: notizie sulle raccolte botaniche, su incarichi ad artisti e artigiani", Commentari d’arte, 42-43, 54-81.
- Witte, Arnold (2000). "A New Date for Lanfranco's Decoration of the Camerino Degli Eremiti", The Burlington Magazine 142, 423-428. https://www.jstor.org/stable/888798
- Witte, Arnold (2003). "Liturgy, History and Art: Domenichino's Cappella dei Santi Fondatori", The Burlington Magazine 145, 777-786. https://www.jstor.org/stable/20073283
- Witte, Arnold (2008). The Artful Hermitage: The Palazzetto Farnese as a Counter-reformation 'diaeta' , Rome (L'Erma di Bretschneider). ISBN 9788882654771.

== See also ==
- The Choice of Hercules (Carracci)
