= Catarina of Portugal, Duchess of Braganza =

Claimant to the Portuguese throne in 1580

Catherine
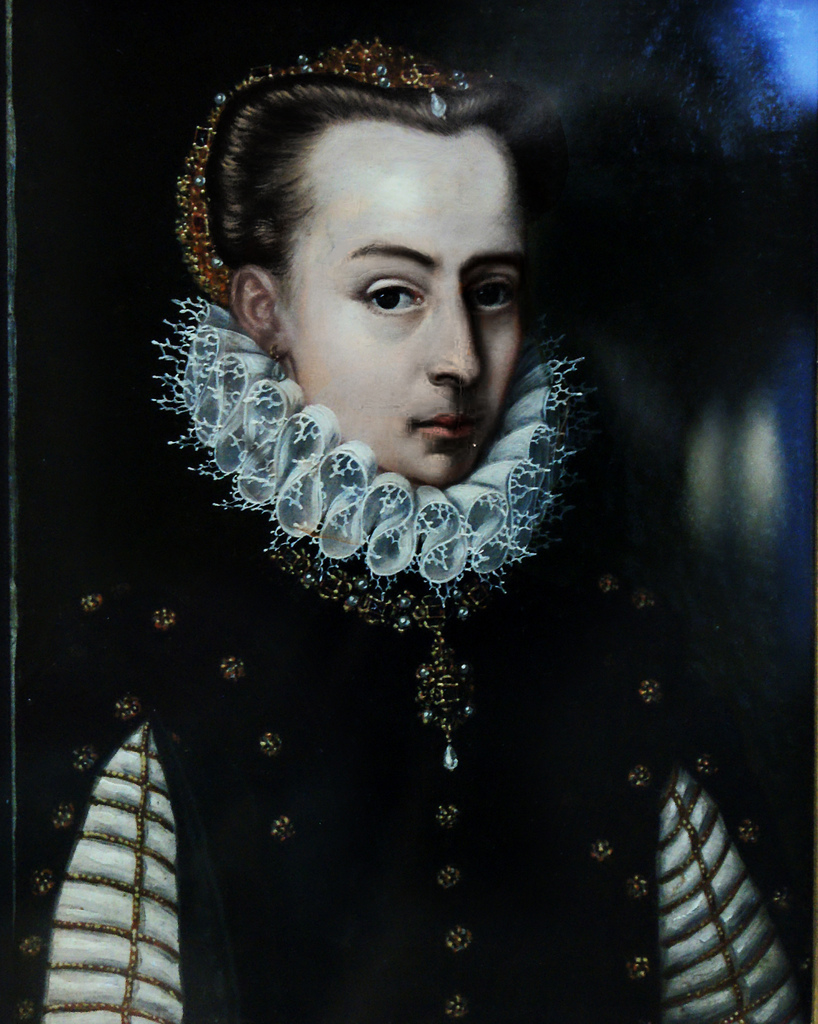
- Born: 18 January 1540; Lisbon, Portugal
- Died: 15 November 1614 (aged 74); Vila Viçosa, Portugal
- Spouse: João I, Duke of Braganza (m. 1563; died 1583)
- Issue among others...: Teodósio of Braganza
- House: Aviz
- Father: Duarte, Duke of Guimarães
- Mother: Isabel of Braganza
- Religion: Roman Catholicism

Infanta Catherine of Portugal, Duchess of Braganza (Portuguese: Catarina; Portuguese pronunciation: [kɐtɐˈɾinɐ], 18 January 1540 – 15 November 1614) was a Portuguese infanta (princess) claimant to the throne during the Portuguese succession crisis of 1580.

== Biography ==
=== Background ===
Catherine was the second daughter of Duarte, Duke of Guimarães (sixth son of Manuel I of Portugal) and Isabel of Braganza. Beginning in 1549, she was educated alongside her cousin Prince João Manuel by Diego Sigeo, father of the renowned humanist Luisa Sigea. On 6 December 1563, she married João I, Duke of Braganza, head of the most powerful aristocratic house in Portugal. The two were first cousins.

=== Succession crisis ===
Following the death of young King of Sebastian of Portugal in the Battle of Alcácer Quibir, his great-uncle Henry I of Portugal succeeded to the throne. Elderly and bound to ecclesiastical vows, Henry could not produce a direct heir, leading to much deliberation over his successor during his short reign. Catherine was Henry's preferred successor, but because of her sex, the powerful influence of Philip II, and the unpopularity of her husband, she failed to garner popular support. Her main rivals were António, Prior of Crato, the male-line but illegitimate grandson of Manuel I, and Philip II of Spain, the son of Manuel's eldest daughter.

In February 1579, King Henry summoned the candidates to submit their claims to a panel of jurists. António's swift dismissal as a result of illegitimacy left only Philip II and Catherine in formal contention. Catherine’s descent through a male line, as the daughter of Manuel's youngest son, Duarte, offered her precedence over Philip. The heir by primogeniture was Catherine’s nephew Ranuccio Farnese, (Note: Rannucio's claim was not pressed because his father, Alessandro Farnese, Duke of Parma, was an ally of Philip II.) being the son of her late older sister Maria, followed by his siblings; then the Duchess herself and her children; and only after them, King Philip. Although Philip lacked legal arguments, he wielded immense power and influence over the Portuguese aristocracy, securing their support through bribery and coercion.

Philip even tried to bribe Catherine's husband, the Duke of Braganza, to abandon his wife's pretensions, offering him the Vice-Kingdom of Brazil, the post of Grand-Master of the Order of Christ, a license to send a personal ship to India every year, and the marriage of one of his daughters to Diego, Prince of Asturias, Philip's heir at that time. The Duke of Braganza, influenced by Catherine, refused the proposal.

Despite António being formally eliminated, his popularity overshadowed Catherine's. Portugal had not yet seen an undisputed queen regnant and there were doubts about a woman's ability to effectively rule. In this regard, her prospects should have been bolstered by having a husband with direct royal lineage with whom she could share sovereignty and a son, Teodósio, that would serve as heir and successor to the throne. However, the Duke of Braganza's perceived weak leadership and widespread unpopularity compounded by Teodósio's absence (Note: Following his participation in the Battle of Alcácer Quibir alongside King Sebastian, young Teodósio's return home was intentionally delayed by Philip during the succession crisis.) only weakened Catherine's candidacy further.

And so, Henry gradually came to view Philip as the only viable option to secure a smooth succession. In an attempt to spare his people a civil war or an invasion from Castile, the two began unofficial negotiations. Philip now believed an agreement in principle existed, desptie Henry's failure to state so in his will. On January 28 Henry fell into a coma. The same night, Antonio appeared in Almeirim, seat the cortes, followed by Catherine the next day.

King Henry died on 31 January 1580 without having appointed a successor, leaving a regency of five governors to assume power while the panel continued to deliberate. António promptly sought to claim the throne through popular acclamation in Lisbon, while Catherine and her husband adopted a more cautious stance, awaiting the findings of Henry's panel of jurists. In the interim, Philip grew impatient and initiated military preparations, dispatching the Duke of Alba in June to secure Portugal by force. Catherine and her husband submitted to Philip's military pressure and paid him homage by proxy in December 1580, together with other nobles and ecclesiastics. After defeating António in the brief War of the Portuguese Succession, Philip was recognized as King of Portugal by the Cortes of Tomar in 1581.

=== Legacy ===
In 1640, Catherine's grandson and direct heir, the then 8th Duke of Braganza, was proclaimed King John IV of Portugal by the Portuguese nobility, marking the end of the 60-year-old Iberian Union and establishing the House of Braganza on the Portuguese throne. The 'laws of Lamego' were used to justify his accession and designate the Spanish Habsburg king, Philip III of Portugal, a usurper.

These laws, purportedly enacted by the Cortes of Lamego in 1143 but now widely accepted to be fictitious, asserted that no woman that married a foreign prince could inherit the Portuguese crown or transfer succession rights. This excluded both Philip II and Ranuccio Farnese from the succession, rendering Catherine the legitimate heiress.

== Issue ==
Catherine and her husband had the following children:

- Maria of Braganza (1565–1592).
- Seraphina of Braganza (1566–1604), married Juan Fernandez Pacheco, 5th Duke of Escalona, and had issue.
- Teodósio of Braganza (1568–1630), succeeded his father as Duke of Braganza; father of King John IV of Portugal.
- Edward of Braganza, 1st Marquis of Frechilla.
- Alexander of Braganza, Archbishop of Évora.
- Cherubina of Braganza (1572–1580).
- Angelica of Braganza (1573–1576).
- Isabella of Braganza (1578–1582).
- Philip of Braganza (1581–1608).

== Ancestry ==
Ancestors of Catarina of Portugal, Duchess of Braganza

8. Ferdinand, Duke of Viseu
4. Manuel I of Portugal
9. Beatrice of Portugal
2. Edward, Duke of Guimarães
10. Ferdinand II of Aragon
5. Maria of Aragon
11. Isabella I of Castile
1. Catherine of Portugal
12. Fernando, 3rd Duke of Braganza
6. Jaime, 4th Duke of Braganza
13. Isabel of Viseu
3. Isabel of Braganza
14. Juan Alonso, 3rd Duke of Medina Sidonia
7. Leonor de Guzmán y Velasco
15. Isabel de Velasco y Mendoza

== Notes ==
Catarina of Portugal, Duchess of Braganza House of Aviz Cadet branch of the House of Burgundy Born: 18 January 1540 Died: 15 November 1614
Titles in pretence
Preceded by Henry	— TITULAR — Queen of Portugal and the Algarves; Beja claimant 1580–1614; Reason for succession failure: Habsburg conquest of Portugal	Succeeded by Teodósio
