= Miguel da Paz, Prince of Portugal =

Iberian heir apparent (1498–1500)

Miguel da Paz
- Hereditary Prince of Portugal, Prince of Asturias and Prince of Girona
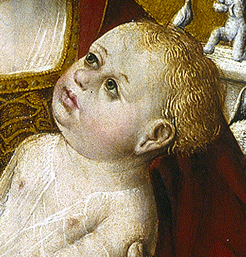
- Born: 23 August 1498; Zaragoza, Aragon
- Died: 19 July 1500 (aged 1); Granada, Castile
- Burial: Capilla Real de Granada, Andalusia, Spain
- House: Aviz
- Father: Manuel I of Portugal
- Mother: Isabella, Princess of Asturias

Iberian kingdoms during Miguel da Paz's lifetime. Had he survived, he would have united the three kingdoms (Castile and León, Aragon, and Portugal) and brought about an Iberian Union.

Miguel da Paz, Hereditary Prince of Portugal and Prince of Asturias and Girona (Portuguese: Miguel da Paz de Trastâmara e Avis, Portuguese pronunciation: [miˈɣɛl dɐ ˈpaʃ]; Spanish: Miguel de la Paz de Avís y Trastámara, "Michael of Peace") (23 August 1498 – 19 July 1500) was a Portuguese royal prince, son of King Manuel I of Portugal and his first wife, Isabella of Aragon, Princess of Asturias.

== Life and death ==
Miguel da Paz was born in Zaragoza, Spain on 23 August 1498. His mother, Isabella of Aragon, died within an hour of his birth. He was shortly sworn heir to the various Iberian crowns by the courts of Portugal, Castile and Aragon. For the next two years, he was the recognized heir of his father's kingdom of Portugal and of the kingdoms of Castile, León and Aragon, which he would inherit from his maternal grandparents, Ferdinand II of Aragon and Isabella I of Castile. As such, he was styled Prince of Portugal, Prince of Asturias and Prince of Girona.

Miguel died in Granada on 19 July 1500, in his grandmother's arms. He was buried in the Capilla Real in Granada.

In October 1500, Miguel's father married Maria of Aragon, who was also the younger sister of Miguel's mother. Maria gave birth to Manuel's eventual successor, John III and to several other children.

The hopes of Isabella I and Ferdinand II to unite all of the Iberian kingdoms vanished with Miguel's death. His aunt Joanna inherited Castile, León and Aragon, and it was her grandson Philip II who established a short-lived Iberian Union.

== Bibliography ==
- Downey, Kirsten (2014). Isabella: the Warrior Queen. New York: Nan A. Talese/Doubleday. ISBN 9780385534116.
- Fernández Álvarez, Manuel (2003). Isabel la Católica (in Spanish). Madrid: Espasa-Calpe. ISBN 84-670-1260-9.

Miguel da Paz, Prince of Portugal House of Aviz Cadet branch of the House of Burgundy Born: 23 August 1498 Died: 19 July 1500
Preceded by James	Hereditary Prince of Portugal; 1498–1500	Succeeded by John
Preceded by Isabella	Prince of Asturias; 1498–1500	Vacant Title next held by Joanna
Preceded by John	Prince of Girona; 1498–1500	Vacant Title next held by Joanna
