= Jaime I =

Jaime I is Spanish for "James I", and may refer to:

- Jaime I de Aragón, (1208–1276), a Spanish king
- Jaime I of Braganza (1479–1532), a Portuguese duke
- Spanish battleship Jaime I (1921–1937)
