= João I, Duke of Braganza =

João I
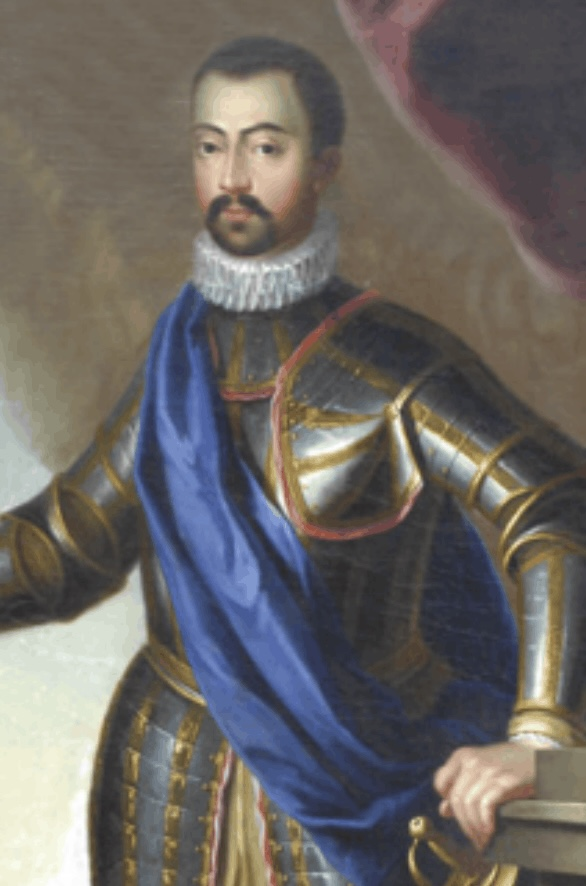
- D. João I; Palace of the Dukes of Braganza

Duke of Braganza
- Tenure: 22 September 1563 – 22 February 1583
- Predecessor: Teodósio I
- Successor: Teodósio II
- Born: 1543; Vila Viçosa, Alentejo, Kingdom of Portugal
- Died: 22 February 1583 (aged 39–40); Vila Viçosa, Vila Viçosa Municipality, Kingdom of Portugal
- Spouse: Infanta Catherine of Portugal (m. 1563)
- Issue among others...: Teodósio II, Duke of Braganza
- House: Braganza
- Father: Teodósio I
- Mother: Isabel of Lencastre

Dom João I of Braganza (1543 – 22 February 1583) was the 6th Duke of Braganza and 1st Duke of Barcelos, among other titles. He is known for pushing the claims of his wife, Infanta Catherine of Portugal, to the throne of Portugal.

== Life ==
In 1563 he married his first cousin Infanta Catherine, daughter of Infante Edward, Duke of Guimarães and Isabel of Braganza (João's aunt).

After the disaster of the Battle of Ksar El Kebir, where heirless King Sebastian of Portugal died, the aged Cardinal-Infante Henry became king. Because Henry was old and not allowed to have legitimate children, a dynastical crisis occurred even before his death.

The Duke of Braganza supported his wife's claim to the throne — she was a granddaughter of King Manuel I. Philip II of Spain, another grandson of Manuel I and also a claimant to the throne, tried to bribe him into abandoning his wife's pretensions, offering him the Viceroyalty of Brazil, the post of Grand Master of the Order of Christ, a license to send a personal ship to India every year, and the marriage of his eldest son Teodósio to one of his daughters (either Isabella Clara Eugenia or Catherine Michaela).

The Duke of Braganza, influenced by his wife, refused these overtures.

== Portuguese succession crisis ==
When the Cardinal-King died, the Duke accompanied the governors of the Kingdom to Lisbon and Setúbal, trying to assure recognition for his wife's claim, but ultimately gave up and accepted the rule of Philip II (future Philip I of Portugal). After the civil war that followed, Anthony, Prior of Crato was defeated at the Battle of Alcântara, and Philip II entered Portugal and was confirmed by the Cortes of Tomar, where João occupied the post of Constable.

When King Philip left to Spain, he endowed the post of Constable of the Kingdom to João's heir Teodósio, a marquessate (Flexilla-Xarandilla) to his second son, Dom Duarte, and a commandment and many concessions to the third, Dom Alexandre, who was destined to become an ecclesiastic. He confirmed João's title of His Excellency and his rights of chancellery.

He died at Vila Viçosa in 1583.

== Marriage and issue ==
Through his marriage with Infanta Catherine of Portugal were born:

- Maria (27 January 1565 – 30 April 1592)
- Serafina (20 May 1566 – 6 January 1604), married Juan Gaspar Fernández Pacheco y Álvarez de Toledo, 5th Duke of Escalona
- Teodósio II, 7th Duke of Braganza (28 April 1568 – 29 November 1630), father of the future king John IV of Portugal, married Ana de Velasco y Girón, daughter of the Duke of Frías
- Duarte (21 September 1569 – 27 May 1627), 1st Marquis of Frechilla and Villarramiel, married first Beatriz Álvarez de Toledo y Pimentel, and later Guiomar Pardo y Tavera, 1st Marquise of Malagón
- Alexandre (17 September 1570 – 11 September 1608), Archbishop of Évora
- Querubina (11 March 1572 – 11 March 1580)
- Angélica (8 June 1573 – 9 October 1576)
- Isabel (13 November 1578 – 12 January 1582)
- Filipe (17 November 1581 – 27 September 1608)

== Ancestry ==
Ancestors of João I, Duke of Braganza

8. Fernando II, Duke of Braganza
4. Jaime, Duke of Braganza
9. Isabel of Viseu
2. Teodósio I, Duke of Braganza
10. Juan Alonso, 3rd Duke of Medina Sidonia
5. Leonor de Guzmán y Velasco
11. Isabel de Velasco y Mendoza
1. João I, Duke of Braganza
12. Fernando II, Duke of Braganza (= 8)
6. Dinis of Braganza
13. Isabel of Viseu (= 9)
3. Isabel of Lencastre
14. Rodrigo, 2nd Count of Lemos
7. Beatriz, 3rd Countess of Lemos
15. Teresa Osorio y Enríquez

== Bibliography ==
- "Nobreza de Portugal e Brasil", Vol. II pages 445 to 448. Published by Zairol Lda., Lisbon 1989

João I, Duke of Braganza House of Braganza Cadet branch of the House of Aviz Born: 1543 Died: 1583
Portuguese nobility
Preceded by Teodósio I	Duke of Braganza; Marquis of Vila Viçosa; Count of Ourém, Neiva, and Arraiolos; 1563–1583	Succeeded by Teodósio II
New title	Duke of Barcelos; 1562–1563	Succeeded by Teodósio II
