= Maria of Portugal, Hereditary Princess of Parma =

Maria of Portugal
- Hereditary Princess of Parma
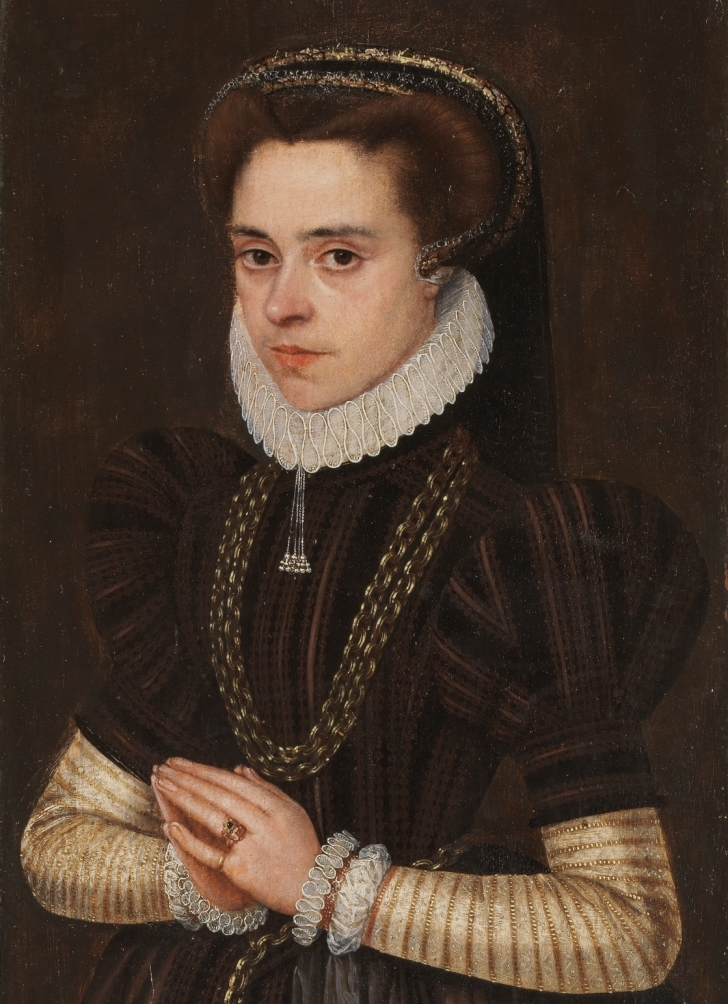
- Portrait by Antonis Mor
- Born: 8 December 1538; Ribeira Palace, Lisbon, Kingdom of Portugal
- Died: 8 July 1577 (aged 38); Parma, Duchy of Parma
- Spouse: Alexander Farnese, Duke of Parma (m. 1565)
- Issue Detail: Ranuccio I Farnese, Duke of Parma; Margherita, Hereditary Princess of Mantua; Cardinal Oddoardo
- House: Aviz (by birth); Farnese (by marriage)
- Father: Infante Duarte, Duke of Guimarães
- Mother: Isabel of Braganza

Infanta Maria of Guimarães (8 December 1538 – 8 July 1577) was a Portuguese infanta and the wife of Alessandro Farnese, heir to the Duchy of Parma and Piacenza. She was Hereditary Princess Consort of Parma from their marriage on 11 November 1565 until her death in 1577.

== Early life and background ==
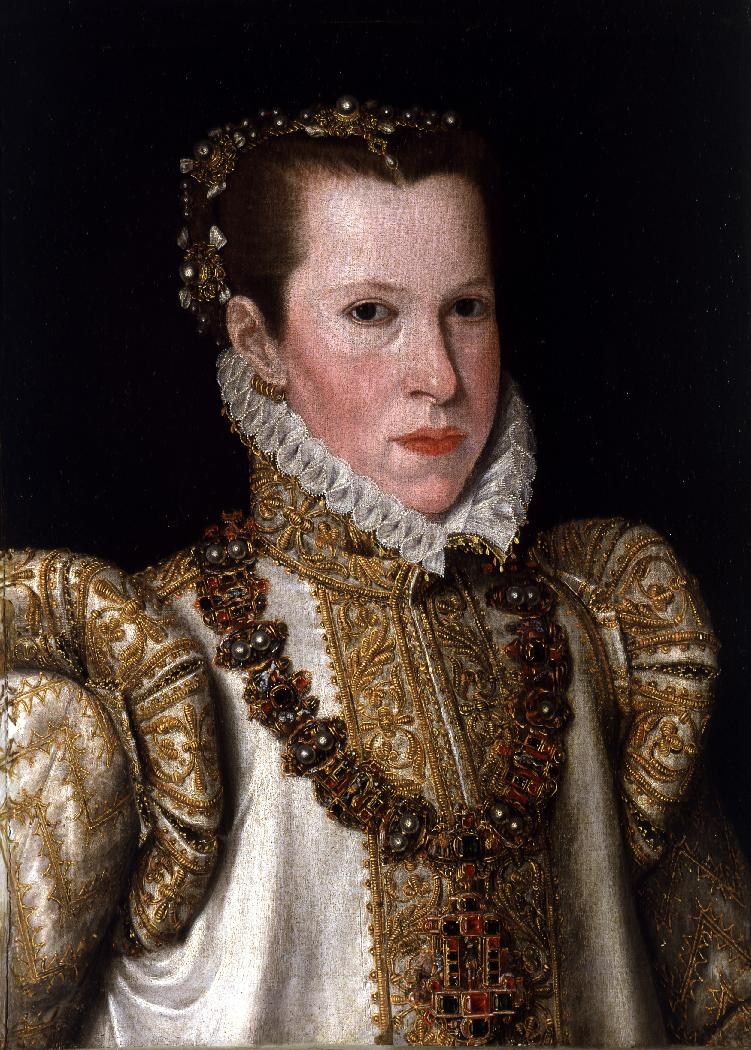
Presumed portrait of Maria at the age of sixteen, c. 1565

Born in Lisbon on 8 December 1538 during the reign of her uncle John III of Portugal, Maria was the eldest daughter of Infante Duarte, sixth son of Manuel I of Portugal, and Isabel of Braganza. (Note: Pietro Fea (1886) provides a different birthdate, 8 October 1538.) She lived in the Ribeira Palace with her mother and younger sister Catarina, not far from the chambers of her aunt, Queen Catherine.

Raised in a deeply religious atmosphere, Maria was a devout Catholic and interested in the study of theology. She was considered well-learned for a woman of her time: she studied mathematics and natural philosophy, could write in Latin, and knew some Greek.

Around 1562, Maria's first cousin, King Philip II of Spain, began lengthy negotiations in Madrid to arrange her marriage with Alessandro Farnese, only son of Ottavio Farnese, Duke of Parma. An agreement was finally reached in September 1564. Alessandro was dissatisfied with the match because Maria was seven years older.

== Princess of Parma ==
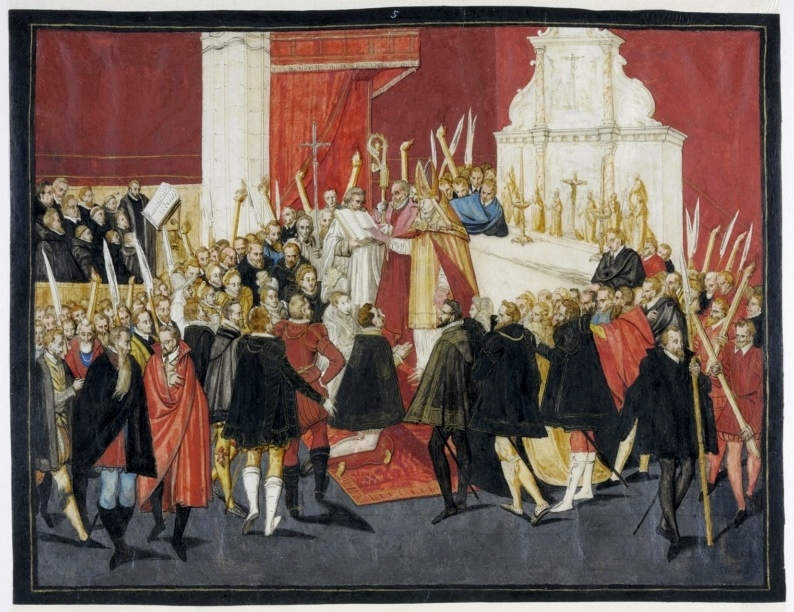
One of several miniatures in a small book depicting scenes of Maria's wedding in Brussels

In May 1565, the proxy wedding ceremony was celebrated in Lisbon, with the Spanish ambassador to Portugal representing Alessandro at the altar. Accompanied by a grand fleet, Maria left Portugal on 14 September 1565. After the Infanta arrived in Flanders, Italian ambassadors remarked that she was more beautiful than expected. The wedding ceremony took place on 11 November 1565 at the court of Alexander's mother, Margaret of Parma, in Brussels. Festivities continued until January 1566.

Maria finally embarked for Italy in May 1566. Fearful of contact with Protestants, she asked her confessor to preach a sermon to her Portuguese entourage warning of the countries "infested with heresy" they would travel through. The Protestant Flemish nobles on board pretended to be Catholic.

In June 1566, Maria made her solemn procession into Parma. Aside from visits to Piacenza, she lived in Parma with a small Portuguese court for the rest of her life. (Note: Before Maria's departure from Flanders, her father-in-law, Ottavio, sought to reduce the size of her Portuguese entourage, offering money to ladies that went back to Portugal.) Famed for her piety, Maria was an influential figure in the city, modeling the ideals of the Counter-Reformation. Her marriage proved mediocre; Maria loved Alessandro but was frustrated by his frequent affairs. The couple's first child, Margherita, was born in 1567, followed by Ranuccio in 1569, and finally Odoardo in 1573.

Besides religion, Maria was interested in food. She brought a collection of recipes, now referred to as O Livro de Cozinha da Infanta D. Maria de Portugal (Cookbook of the Infanta D. Maria), to Parma. The cookbook is believed to be the earliest compendium of Portuguese cuisine. The abundance of sugar in the recipes is noteworthy, appearing in various dishes featuring meat, eggs, and milk. Maria's sugar-rich diet contributed to her severe periodontitis.

== Death ==
After several miscarriages, Maria died at the age of 38 on 8 July 1577. She was first buried in the Church of Clarisse, but in 1593 her remains were moved to the Santa Maria Maddalena to rest beside Alessandro, in accordance with his will. In 1823, as a result of the efforts of Marie Louise, Duchess of Parma, the couple were interred in the Sanctuary of Santa Maria della Steccata.

== Issue ==
Name	Birth	Death	Notes
Margherita Farnese	7 November 1567	13 April 1643	married Vincenzo I, Duke of Mantua in 1581; no issue
Ranuccio Farnese	28 March 1569	5 March 1622	succeeded as Duke of Parma married Margherita Aldobrandini in 1600; had issue
Odoardo Farnese	7 December 1573	21 February 1626	became a Cardinal

=== Succession rights ===
Given that Maria was the eldest daughter of Manuel I of Portugal's only son with surviving legitimate issue, her son Rannucio was the heir by primogeniture to the throne of Portugal during the Portuguese succession crisis of 1580. However, because Alessandro was an ally of Philip II, another contender, Ranuccio's claim was not asserted. Philip ultimately succeeded as King of Portugal, uniting the Portuguese and Spanish Crowns in the Iberian Union.

== Ancestry ==
Ancestors of Maria of Portugal, Hereditary Princess of Parma

8. Ferdinand, Duke of Viseu
4. Manuel I of Portugal
9. Beatriz of Portugal
2. Edward, Duke of Guimarães
10. Ferdinand II of Aragon
5. Maria of Aragon
11. Isabella I of Castile
1. Maria of Portugal
12. Fernando, 3rd Duke of Braganza
6. Jaime, 4th Duke of Braganza
13. Isabel of Viseu
3. Isabel of Braganza
14. Juan Alonso, 3rd Duke of Medina Sidonia
7. Leonor de Guzmán y Velasco
15. Isabel de Velasco y Mendoza
