= Cardinal-Infante Afonso of Portugal =

Portuguese prince and cardinal

His Eminence Afonso of Portugal Archbishop of Lisbon
- Infante of Portugal
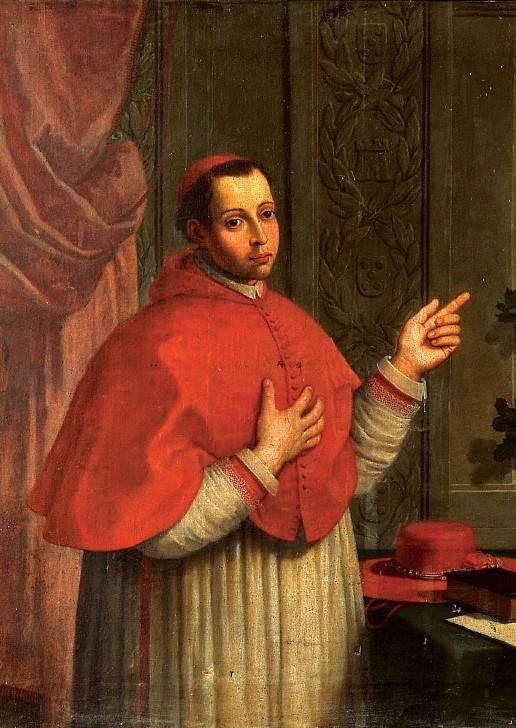
- Church: Catholic church
- Archdiocese: Archdiocese of Lisbon
- Appointed: 20 February 1523
- Term ended: 21 April 1540
- Predecessor: Martinho da Costa
- Successor: Fernando de Meneses
- Other post: Bishop of Évora (1523–1540)
- Previous posts: Bishop of Guarda (1516–1519); Bishop of Viseu (1519–1523)

Orders
- Created cardinal: 1 July 1517 by Pope Leo X
- Rank: Cardinal-Priest

Personal details
- Born: 23 April 1509 Évora
- Died: 21 April 1540 (aged 30) Lisbon
- Denomination: Roman Catholicism
- Parents: Manuel I of Portugal; Maria of Aragon

Cardinal-Infante Afonso (23 April 1509 – 21 April 1540; Portuguese pronunciation: [ɐˈfõsu]; English: Alphonzo) was a Portuguese infante (prince), son of King Manuel I of Portugal and his wife Maria of Aragon.

Because he was the fourth son, after the infantes John, Luís, and Ferdinand, he was assigned by his father to religious life, and he accumulated numerous ecclesiastical benefits even though he did not have the canonical age required to exercise these dignities. He was successively bishop of Guarda, cardinal, bishop of Viseu, bishop of Évora and finally archbishop of Lisbon.

== Life ==
Afonso was born in Évora on 23 April 1509. He was educated at the Portuguese court; he studied humanities, Greek and Latin directed by two masters Aires de Figueiredo Barbosa and André de Resende.

At only three years of age, in 1512, his father Manuel I tried to make him a cardinal; Pope Julius II refused because it was not in accordance with canonical laws, according to which one could not be created a cardinal under 30 years of age. He succeeded in having the pope appoint the young infante as apostolic protonotary in the kingdom of Portugal.

Manuel also succeeded in elevating him to bishop of Guarda, at only seven years of age, on September 9, 1516; he obtained papal dispensation for the exercise of the office because he did not yet have the canonical age for the prelature. Even if he did not carry out any pastoral work, he received the income of the bishopric.

== Cardinal ==
After the embassy led by Tristão da Cunha which Manuel I sent to Pope Leo X in 1514, and which left the Roman Curia very impressed, the Portuguese king again proposed his son for the cardinalship. The pope finally agreed to the request of the Portuguese monarch and created a cardinal Alfonso on July 1, 1517, with the title of cardinal-deacon of Santa Lucia in Septisolio. The title was granted on the condition that the cardinal's chapel would not be given to the young infante until the age of eighteen; however, in Portugal he was always treated and revered as a cardinal, before his title had been made official.

Meanwhile Alfonso was appointed by the monarch as abbot of Alcobaça, and abbot commendatory of the Monastery of Santa Cruz de Coimbra and of the Convent of San Juan de Tarouca.

== Archbishop ==
On February 23, 1519, he resigned from the seat of Guarda and on the same day was transferred to the diocese of Viseu, again with a dispensation because he was not yet of canonical age. On February 20, 1523, at the age of just fourteen, due to the death of Archbishop Martinho da Costa, he was promoted to Archbishop of Lisbon by Pope Adrian VI thanks to the supplications of John III, his brother; in the same way, he was offered the government of the bishopric of Évora (in a seat vacant since the previous year). Once again he was granted a special dispensation for not having the canonical age to preside over a diocese.

He appointed as his vicar in the Lisbon archdiocese the dean of the cathedral, Fernão Gonçalves, who conducted pastoral affairs during his minority. He established his habitual residence in the city of Évora, just as his younger brother, also dedicated to the ecclesiastical career, the cardinal-infante Dom Henrique, would later do.

He died on 21 April 1540, in Lisbon and was buried in Lisbon Cathedral before he was moved to the Jerónimos Monastery.

== See also ==
- Cardinal-Infante (disambiguation)
- Descendants of Manuel I of Portugal

== Ancestry ==
Ancestors of Cardinal-Infante Afonso of Portugal

8. Edward I of Portugal
4. Ferdinand, Duke of Viseu
9. Eleanor of Aragon
2. Manuel I of Portugal
10. John, Constable of Portugal
5. Beatrice of Portugal
11. Isabel of Barcelos
1. Cardinal-Infante Afonso of Portugal
12. John II of Aragon
6. Ferdinand II of Aragon
13. Juana Enríquez
3. Maria of Aragon
14. John II of Castile
7. Isabella I of Castile
15. Isabella of Portugal
