= Isabel of Braganza, Duchess of Guimarães =

16th-century Portuguese noblewoman

Isabel of Braganza
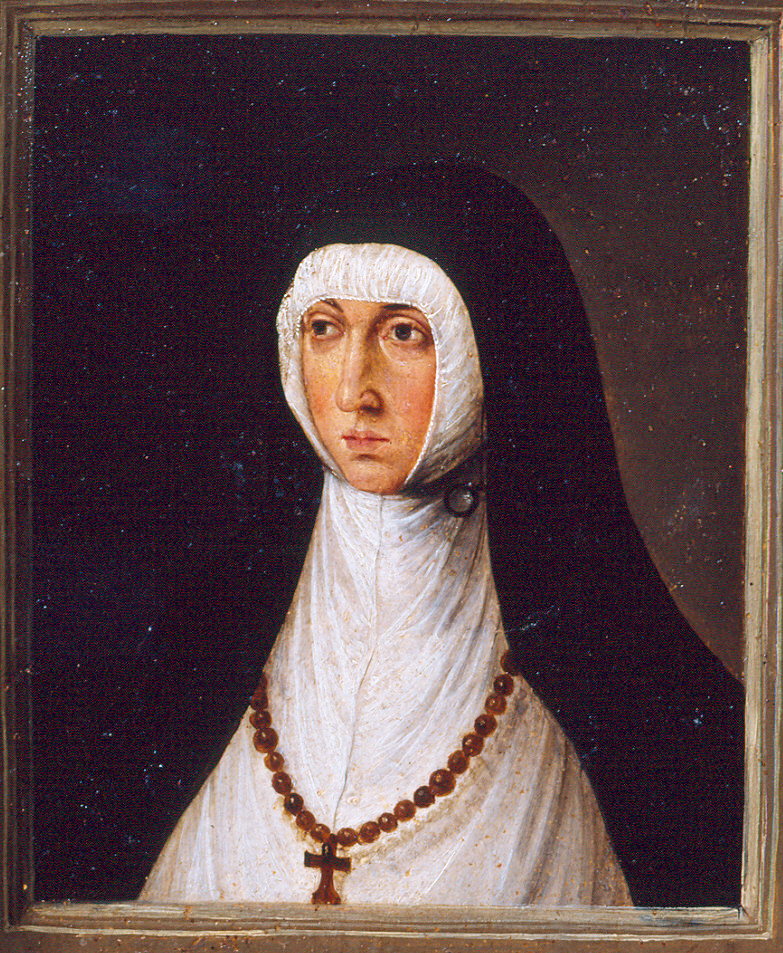
- Portrait by Francisco de Holanda, c. 1540–76.
- Born: 1514
- Died: 16 September 1576; Vila Viçosa
- Spouse: Duarte, Duke of Guimarães
- Issue: Maria of Portugal, Hereditary Princess of Parma; Catarina of Portugal, Duchess of Braganza; Duarte, Duke of Guimarães
- House: Braganza
- Father: Jaime, Duke of Braganza
- Mother: Leonor Pérez de Guzmán

Dona Isabel of Braganza (1514 – 16 September 1576) was a member of the House of Braganza, daughter of Jaime, Duke of Braganza (a nephew of Manuel I of Portugal) and Leonor Pérez de Guzmán.

== Marriage ==
Isabel married her cousin Infante Duarte a son of Manuel I and Maria of Aragon in 1537. Isabel was dowried with the Dukedom of Guimarães, which had belonged to her brother Teodósio I, Duke of Braganza. After the marriage, Infante Duarte became the 4th Duke of Guimarães.

Her younger daughter Catherine became the Duchess of Braganza and had a claim to the throne of Portugal. She was also part of the succession crisis.

== Issue ==
This marriage produced three children:

- Mary of Guimarães (1538–1577), married Alessandro Farnese, Duke of Parma and Piacenza.
- Infanta Catherine of Guimarães (1540–1614), Duchess of Braganza, married to John, 6th Duke of Braganza, she was a claimant of the throne of Portugal in 1580 (See: 1580 Portuguese succession crisis).
- Infante Duarte II, 5th Duke of Guimarães (1541–1576)

== Ancestry ==
Ancestors of Isabel of Braganza, Duchess of Guimarães

8. Fernando I, Duke of Braganza
4. Fernando II, Duke of Braganza
9. Joana de Castro
2. Jaime, Duke of Braganza
10. Ferdinand, Duke of Viseu
5. Isabel of Viseu
11. Beatrice of Portugal
1. Isabel of Braganza
12. Enrique, 2nd Duke of Medina Sidonia
6. Juan Alonso, 3rd Duke of Medina Sidonia
13. Leonor de Ribera y Mendoza
3. Leonor de Guzmán y Velasco
14. Pedro, 2nd Count of Haro
7. Isabel de Velasco y Mendoza
15. Mencía de Mendoza y Figueroa
