= Duke of Guimarães =

Hereditary title in the Peerage of Spain

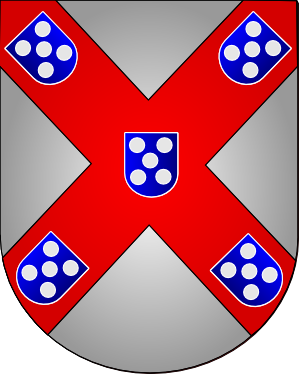
Original Coat of Arms of the Dukes of Braganza.

Personal Coat of Arms of Infante Duarte I, 4th Duke of Guimarães.

Duke of Guimarães was a Nobility title granted by King Afonso V of Portugal in 1475, to Ferdinand II, 3rd Duke of Braganza. The king just upgraded the previous title of count of Guimarães, that he granted to the same Duke of Braganza, some years before (in 1464).

When Isabel of Braganza married Infante Duarte, King Manuel I of Portugal's youngest son, her brother, Teodósio I, Duke of Braganza ceded the dukedom as her dowry, and Duarte became the 4th duke of Guimarães. As their son (Duarte II, 5th duke of Guimarães) died without issue, the dukedom returned to the crown, but was soon granted again to the House of Braganza, when king Philip III of Portugal, gave it to John II, 8th Duke of Braganza.

== List of dukes of Guimarães ==
1. Ferdinand II, Duke of Braganza (1430–1483). Count of Guimarães (1464), Duke of Guimarães (1475);
2. Jaime, Duke of Braganza (1479–1532);
3. Teodósio I, Duke of Braganza (1510–1563);
4. Infante Duarte, 4th Duke of Guimarães (1515–1540);
5. Infante Duarte, 5th Duke of Guimarães (1541–1576);
6. John II, 8th Duke of Braganza (1604–1656). Became King of Portugal in 1640;

=== Claimants ===
The following individuals have claimed the title of Duke of Guimarães:

1. Infanta Adelgundes, Duchess of Guimarães (1858–1946), daughter of King Miguel I of Portugal, married Prince Henry, Count of Bardi (son of Charles III of Parma);
2. Duarte Pio, Duke of Braganza (born 1945), current Duke of Braganza.

== See also ==
- Portuguese nobility
- Duke of Braganza
- Count of Guimarães
- Dukedoms in Portugal

== Bibliography ==
"Nobreza de Portugal e Brazil" - Vol. II, pages 651–652. Published by Zairol Lda., Lisbon 1989.
