= Henry, King of Portugal =

Cardinal; King of Portugal from 1578 to 1580

Henry
- Cardinal of the Catholic Church
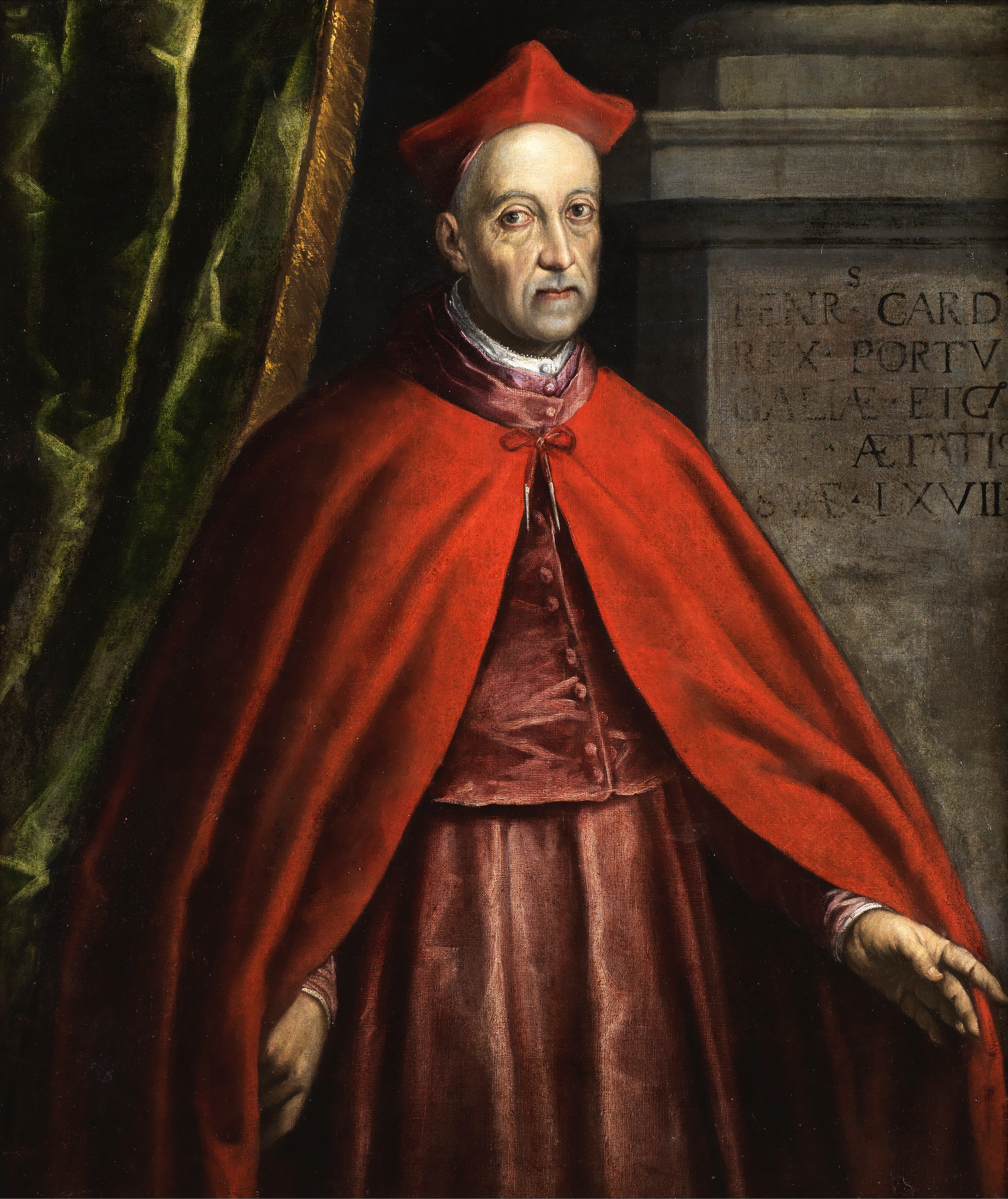
- Portrait, 1579

King of Portugal
- Reign: 4 August 1578 – 31 January 1580
- Coronation: 28 August 1578, Lisbon
- Predecessor: Sebastian
- Successor: Anthony (disputed) or Philip I
- Born: 31 January 1512; Lisbon, Portugal
- Died: 31 January 1580 (aged 68); Almeirim, Portugal
- Burial: Jerónimos Monastery
- Dynasty: Aviz
- Father: Manuel I of Portugal
- Mother: Maria of Aragon
- Religion: Catholicism

Henry (Portuguese: Henrique [ẽˈʁikɨ]; 31 January 1512 – 31 January 1580), dubbed the Chaste (Portuguese: o Casto) and the Cardinal-King (Portuguese: o Cardeal-Rei), was King of Portugal and an inquisitor and cardinal of the Catholic Church, who ruled Portugal between 1578 and 1580. As a clergyman, he was bound to celibacy, and as such, had no children to succeed him, and thus put an end to the reigning House of Aviz. His death led to the Portuguese succession crisis of 1580 and ultimately to the 60-year Iberian Union that saw Portugal share a monarch with Habsburg Spain. The next independent monarch of Portugal would be John IV, who restored the throne after 60 years of Spanish rule. He was the only cardinal to have served as a monarch.

== Life ==
Born in Lisbon, Henry was the fifth son of King Manuel I of Portugal and Maria of Aragon.

=== Cardinal ===
As the younger brother of King John III of Portugal and a younger son in the Royal Family, Henry was not expected to succeed to the Portuguese throne. Early in his life, Henry took Holy Orders to promote Portuguese interests within the Catholic Church, then dominated by Spain. In 1523, at the age of eleven, the Infante received his first ecclesiastical benefice. He rose rapidly through the Church hierarchy, becoming in quick succession Archbishop of Braga, Archbishop of Évora, and Grand Inquisitor before being made a cardinal on 16 December 1545, (Note: Henry's brother Alonso had also been made a cardinal, in 1517 at the age of eight.) with titular custodianship of Santi Quattro Coronati. From 1564 to 1570 he was Archbishop of Lisbon. Henry, more than anyone, endeavoured to bring the Jesuits to Portugal to encourage their activity in the colonial empire.

Styles of Henry of Portugal
- Reference style: His Royal Highness (Note: As King, Cardinal Henry deprecated the manner of address of "Your Majesty", considering it to be appropriate only when applied to God.)
- Spoken style: Your Royal Highness
- Religious style: His Eminence
- Informal style: Cardinal-King

=== Reign ===
Henry served as regent for his great-nephew King Sebastian, replacing his sister-in-law and Sebastian's grandmother Queen dowager Catherine, following her resignation from the role in 1562. King Sebastian died without an heir in the disastrous Battle of Alcácer Quibir that took place in 1578, and the elderly cardinal was proclaimed king soon after. Henry sought to be released from his ecclesiastical vows so he could take a bride and pursue the continuation of the Aviz dynasty, but Pope Gregory XIII, not wanting to antagonize Philip II of Spain, did not grant him that release.

==== Death and succession ====
The Cardinal-King died in the Royal Palace of Almeirim, on his 68th birthday, without having appointed a successor, leaving only a regency to care for the kingdom. One of the closest dynastic claimants was King Philip II of Spain who, in June 1580, sent the Duke of Alba to claim Portugal by force. Lisbon soon fell, and Philip was elected king of Portugal at the Portuguese Cortes of Tomar in 1581— on the condition that the kingdom and its overseas territories would retain their autonomy.

== Ancestry ==
Ancestors of Henry, King of Portugal

8. Edward, King of Portugal
4. Ferdinand, Duke of Viseu
9. Eleanor of Aragon
2. Manuel I of Portugal
10. John, Constable of Portugal
5. Beatrice of Portugal
11. Isabel of Barcelos
1. Henry, King of Portugal
12. John II of Aragon
6. Ferdinand II of Aragon
13. Juana Enríquez
3. Maria of Aragon
14. John II of Castile
7. Isabella I of Castile
15. Isabella of Portugal

== See also ==
- Struggle for the throne of Portugal
- War of the Portuguese Succession
- Descendants of Manuel I of Portugal

== Bibliography ==
- Disney, A. R. (2009). A History of Portugal and the Portuguese Empire. Vol. I. Cambridge University Press. ISBN 978-0-521-60397-3.
- MacKay, Ruth (2012). The Baker Who Pretended to Be King of Portugal. University of Chicago Press. ISBN 978-0226501086.
- McMurdo, Edward (1889). The History of Portugal, from the Commencement of the Monarchy to the Reign of Alfonso III. Vol. III. London: Sampson Low, Marston, Searle, & Rivington.
- Pacheco, Milton Pedro Dias (2017). "The Counter-Reformation, Diplomacy, and Art Patronage in Portugal under Cardinal-Infant D. Henrique of Portugal" (PDF). Royal Studies Journal. 4 (2). Winchester University Press.
- Stephens, Henry Morse (1903). The Story of Portugal. G.P. Putnam's Sons. ISBN 978-0722224731.

Henry, King of Portugal House of Aviz Cadet branch of the House of Burgundy Born: 31 January 1512 Died: 31 January 1580
Regnal titles
| Preceded by Sebastian | King of Portugal; 1578–1580 | Succeeded by Anthony or Philip I |
Catholic Church titles
| Preceded by Diogo de Sousa | Archbishop of Braga; 1533–1539 | Succeeded by Diego da Silva |
| Preceded by Cardinal-Infante Afonso of Portugal as Bishop of Evora | Archbishop of Evora; 1540–1564 | Succeeded by João de Melo |
| Preceded by Fernando de Menezes Coutinho e Vasconcellos | Archbishop of Lisboa; 1564–1569 | Succeeded by Jorge de Almeida |
| Preceded by João de Melo | Archbishop of Evora; 1574–1578 | Succeeded by Teotónio de Bragança |
