= Duarte, Duke of Guimarães (1515–1540) =

Duarte
- Duke of Guimarães
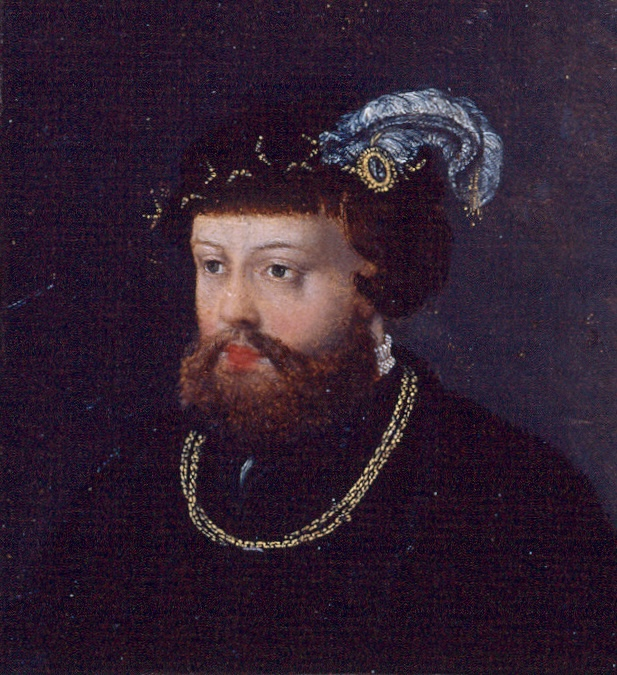
- Born: 7 October 1515; Lisbon, Kingdom of Portugal
- Died: 20 September 1540 (aged 24); Lisbon, Kingdom of Portugal
- Spouse: Isabel of Braganza (m. 1537)
- Issue: Maria, Hereditary Princess of Parma; Catarina, Duchess of Braganza; Duarte, Duke of Guimarães
- House: Aviz
- Father: Manuel I of Portugal
- Mother: Maria of Aragon

Duarte, Duke of Guimarães (7 October 1515 – 20 September 1540) was a Portuguese infante (prince); the sixth son of King Manuel I of Portugal and his second wife Maria of Aragon.

== Life ==
Personal Coat of Arms of Prince Duarte I, 4th Duke of Guimarães

Duarte was born in Lisbon on 7 October 1515. He was tutored by André de Resende, who later wrote his biography. The Infante loved hunting and was quite a good musician.

In 1537, Duarte married Isabella of Braganza, daughter of James, Duke of Braganza, who was dowried with the Dukedom of Guimarães in her own right. After the marriage, Infante Duarte became the 4th Duke of Guimarães.

This marriage produced three children:

- Infanta Maria of Guimarães (1538–1577), married Alessandro Farnese, Duke of Parma and Piacenza.
- Infanta Catarina, Duchess of Braganza (1540–1614), Duchess of Braganza, married to John, 6th Duke of Braganza, she was a claimant of the throne of Portugal in 1580 (See: 1580 Portuguese succession crisis).
- Infante Duarte, 5th Duke of Guimarães (1541–1576)

He is buried in the Monastery of Jerónimos in Lisbon.

== Ancestry ==
Ancestors of Duarte of Portugal

16. John I of Portugal (= 20)
8. Edward I of Portugal
17. Philippa of Lancaster (= 21)
4. Ferdinand, Duke of Viseu
18. Ferdinand I of Aragon (= 24)
9. Eleanor of Aragon
19. Eleanor of Alburquerque (= 25)
2. Manuel I of Portugal
20. John I of Portugal (= 16)
10. John, Constable of Portugal (= 30)
21. Philippa of Lancaster (= 17)
5. Beatrice of Portugal
22. Afonso I, Duke of Braganza
11. Isabel of Barcelos (= 31)
23. Beatriz Pereira de Alvim
1. Duarte, Duke of Guimarães
24. Ferdinand I of Aragon (= 18)
12. John II of Aragon
25. Eleanor of Alburquerque (= 19)
6. Ferdinand II of Aragon
26. Fadrique Enríquez de Mendoza
13. Juana Enríquez
27. Mariana Fernández de Córdoba
3. Maria of Aragon
28. Henry III of Castile
14. John II of Castile
29. Catherine of Lancaster
7. Isabella I of Castile
30. John, Constable of Portugal (= 10)
15. Isabella of Portugal
31. Isabel of Barcelos (= 11)

== See also ==
- Descendants of Manuel I of Portugal
- Dukedoms in Portugal
- André de Resende

== Bibliography ==
- ”Nobreza de Portugal e do Brasil” – Vol. I, page 387. Published by Zairol Lda., Lisbon 1989.

Portuguese nobility
| Preceded by Teodósio I, Duke of Braganza | Duke of Guimarães; 1537–1540 | Succeeded by Duarte II, 5th Duke of Guimarães |
