= Maria of Aragon, Queen of Portugal =

Queen of Portugal from 1500 to 1517

Maria of Aragon
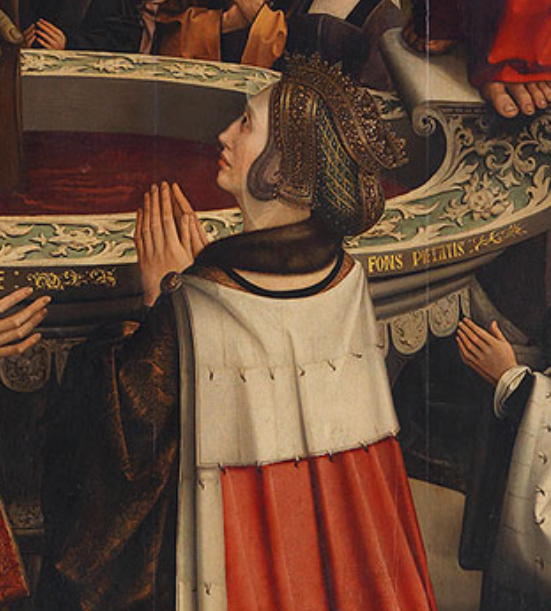
- Maria in a portrait by Colijn de Coter, c. 1515-1517.

Queen consort of Portugal
- Tenure: 30 October 1500 – 7 March 1517
- Born: 29 June 1482; Córdoba, Kingdom of Castile
- Died: 7 March 1517 (aged 34); Lisbon, Kingdom of Portugal
- Burial: Jerónimos Monastery, Lisbon, Kingdom of Portugal
- Spouse: Manuel I of Portugal (m. 1500)
- Issue see details...: John III, King of Portugal; Isabella, Holy Roman Empress; Beatrice, Duchess of Savoy; Luís, Duke of Beja; Ferdinand, Duke of Guarda; Infante Afonso; Henry, King of Portugal; Duarte, Duke of Guimarães
- House: Trastámara
- Father: Ferdinand II of Aragon
- Mother: Isabella I of Castile

Maria of Aragon (29 June 1482 – 7 March 1517) was Queen of Portugal from 30 October 1500 until her death in 1517 as the second wife of King Manuel I. Manuel was the widower of Maria's elder sister, Isabella.

== Life ==
=== Early life ===
Maria was born at Córdoba on 29 June 1482 as the third surviving daughter of Isabella I of Castile and Ferdinand II of Aragon (the Catholic monarchs). She was the fourth of their five surviving children, and had a stillborn twin (the sources differ on the gender of Maria's twin). Like her sisters, she was given a thorough education, not only in household tasks such us baking, cooking, embroidery, lace-making, needlepoint, sewing, spinning, and weaving but also in arithmetic, astronomy, Latin, several other languages, genealogy and heraldry, geography, grammar, history, philosophy and the classics as well as chess, court etiquette, dancing, drawing, equestrian skills, good manners, music, and singing.

=== Marriage ===
As an infanta of Spain, her hand in marriage was important in European politics. Before her marriage to Manuel I of Portugal, her parents entertained the idea of marrying her to King James IV of Scotland. This was at a time when her younger sister Catherine's marriage to Arthur, Prince of Wales, was being planned. Ferdinand and Isabella thought if Maria was Queen of Scotland, the two sisters could keep the peace between their husbands. These plans, however, came to nothing. Her eldest sister Isabella, Princess of Asturias, was the first wife of Manuel I, but her death in 1498 created a necessity for Manuel to remarry; Maria became the next bride of the Portuguese king, reaffirming dynastic links with Iberian royal houses.

Manuel and Maria were married in Alcácer do Sal on 30 October 1500, and Maria was granted Viseu and Torres Vedras as her dower. She had 10 children, eight of whom reached adulthood, including King John III of Portugal, Holy Roman Empress Isabella, and Beatrice, Duchess of Savoy.

=== Queen ===
Queen Maria was described as pale and thin to her exterior, with a retiring chin, and had a very serious character to her personality. Despite the fact that she was queen during a famous time period in Portuguese history, when the Portuguese court was one of the richest in Europe, she did not play any significant part as an individual. Serious and pious, she devoted her time to sewing, pious devotion and supervising the education of her children in accordance with the principles of her parents. She maintained a close correspondence with her parents, got along well with her sisters-in-law the duchess Isabella of Braganza and the queen dowager Eleanor, and her mother-in-law Beatrice, and hosted a large court with both Spanish and Portuguese ladies-in-waiting. King Manuel appreciated her pious nature, treated her with respect and awarded her with expensive clothes and jewelry during her pregnancies.

Queen Maria was not described as politically active, though chronicles praised her for occasionally persuading her husband to an act of mercy. She was, however, somewhat involved in religious politics. She supported King Manuel's religious-imperial project, including the plan to conquer the Mamluk's realm, destroy Mecca and Medina and reconquer Christian holy places such as Jerusalem. She co-founded the Jeronimos Monastery in Lisbon.

During her life in Portugal, Maria was almost continually pregnant. Normally, she had but a few months pause between a delivery and her next pregnancy. This state of affairs resulted in a continual deterioration of her health and after the delivery of 1516, she was reportedly exhausted to a point that she was also temporarily mentally confused before she recuperated. She died in Lisbon on 7 March 1517, and was buried at the Jerónimos Monastery of Belém.

== Legacy ==
In 1580, the dynastic links from the marriage led to a succession crisis in Portugal that made her grandson Philip II of Spain king of Portugal as Philip I of Portugal.

== Ancestry ==
Ancestors of Maria of Aragon

8. Ferdinand I of Aragon
4. John II of Aragon
9. Eleanor of Alburquerque
2. Ferdinand II of Aragon
10. Fadrique Enríquez de Mendoza
5. Juana Enríquez
11. Mariana Fernández de Córdoba
1. Maria of Aragon
12. Henry III of Castile
6. John II of Castile
13. Catherine of Lancaster
3. Isabella I of Castile
14. John, Constable of Portugal
7. Isabella of Portugal
15. Isabel of Barcelos

== Issue ==
Her marriage with Manuel produced the following children:

Name	Birth	Death	Notes
King John III	6 June 1502	11 June 1557	Succeeded Manuel as King of Portugal. Had issue.
Infanta Isabella	24 October 1503	1 May 1539	Married Charles V, Holy Roman Emperor. Had issue.
Infanta Beatrice	31 December 1504	8 January 1538	Married Charles III, Duke of Savoy. Had issue.
Infante Luis, Duke of Beja	3 March 1506	27 November 1555	Unmarried but had illegitimate descendants, one of them being António, Prior of Crato, a claimant of the throne of Portugal in 1580 (See: Struggle for the throne of Portugal).
Infante Ferdinand, Duke of Guarda	5 June 1507	7 November 1534	Married Guiomar Coutinho, Countess of Marialva. No surviving issue.
Infante Afonso	23 April 1509	21 April 1540	Cardinal of the Kingdom.
Infanta Maria	1511	1513	She died at the age of 2.
King Henry	31 January 1512	31 January 1580	Cardinal of the Kingdom who succeeded his grandnephew King Sebastian (Manuel's great-grandson) as 17th King of Portugal. His death triggered the struggle for the throne of Portugal.
Infante Duarte, Duke of Guimarães	7 October 1515	20 September 1540	Duke of Guimarães and great-grandfather of John IV of Portugal. Married Isabella of Braganza, daughter of Jaime, Duke of Braganza.
Infante António	8 September 1516	1 November 1516	He died less than two months later.

Her widowed husband later married a third time, in 1518, also this time from her family: Maria's niece Eleanor of Austria.

== Sources ==
- Bergenroth, G A, ed. (1862). "Spain: July 1498, 21–31". Calendar of State Papers, Spain, Volume 1, 1485–1509.
- Harris, Carolyn (2017). Raising Royalty: 1000 Years of Royal Parenting. Dundurn Press.
- Howe, Elizabeth Teresa (2008). Education and Women in the Early Modern Hispanic World. Ashgate Publishing Limited.
- Serrano, Joana Bouza. Maria de Castela (1482–1517): uma rainha do Renascimento. In: As avis: as grandes rainhas que partilharam o trono de Portugal na segunda dinastia. 2ª ed. Lisboa: A Esfera dos Livros, 2009
- Buescu, Ana Isabel (2019). D. Beatriz de Portugal (1504-1538). A Infanta Esquecida (in Portuguese). Lisbon: Manuscrito.
- Media related to Maria of Aragon, Queen of Portugal at Wikimedia Commons

Maria of Aragon, Queen of Portugal House of Trastámara Born: 29 June 1482 Died: 7 March 1517
Portuguese royalty
Vacant Title last held by Isabella of Aragon	Queen consort of Portugal; 30 October 1500 – 7 March 1517	Vacant Title next held by Eleanor of Austria
