= Jaime, Duke of Braganza =

Portuguese nobleman (1479–1532)

Jaime I
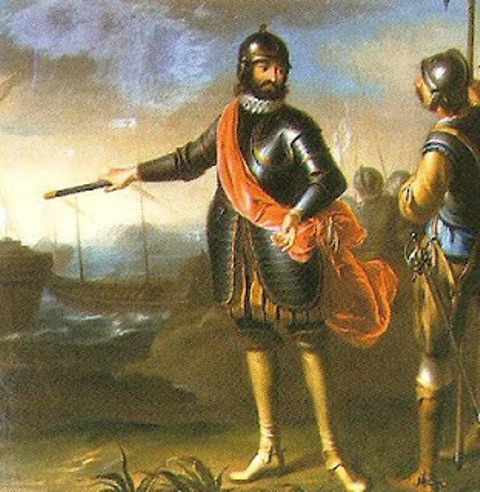
- D. Jaime I; Ducal Palace of Vila Viçosa

Duke of Braganza
- Tenure: 20 June 1483 – 20 September 1532
- Predecessor: Fernando II
- Successor: Teodósio I
- Born: 1479; Castle of Vila Viçosa, Vila Viçosa, Portugal
- Died: 20 September 1532 (aged 52–53); Ducal Palace of Vila Viçosa, Vila Viçosa, Portugal
- Spouse: Leonor de Guzmán (m. 1502; died 1512) Joana de Mendoça (m. 1520)
- Issue: Isabel, Duchess of Guimarães; Teodósio I, 5th Duke of Braganza; Joana, Marquise of Elche; Jaime; Eugénia, Marquise of Ferreira; Maria; Constantino, 7th Viceroy of India; Fulgêncio; Teotónio, 3rd Archbishop of Évora; Vicência
- House: Braganza
- Father: Fernando II, Duke of Braganza
- Mother: Isabella of Viseu

Jaime of Braganza (1479 – 20 September 1532) was the 4th Duke of Braganza and the 2nd Duke of Guimarães, among other titles. He saw his father Fernando II executed for treason, and his family exiled. After King John II’s death, King Manuel I restored their wealth in 1498. Jaime built a new palace, was briefly heir presumptive, and later avoided punishment for killing his wife by conquering Azamor in Morocco.

== Life ==
Born in 1479, Jaime I of Braganza was young when he witnessed the arrest and execution of his father, Fernando II, Duke of Braganza, and of his uncle, Diogo, Duke of Viseu and Duke of Beja. They were both executed for treason when King John II discovered a plot among the nobility against the Crown. After his father's death, Jaime's family, the House of Braganza, were banished to Castile and their properties and vast wealth were seized by the Portuguese Crown.

After King John II's death in 1495, the throne passed to his first cousin, King Manuel I of Portugal. In 1498, King Manuel I, having been a powerful nobleman before his ascension to the throne, forgave the House of Braganza and welcomed them back to Portugal. He returned all their possessions and then some, but demanded devout loyalty from Duke Jaime of Braganza. Seeking to demonstrate the power of the House of Braganza after his wealth was returned, Jaime declined to live at Vila Viçosa Castle (owing to its association with his father's betrayal and murder) and built the Ducal Palace of Vila Viçosa as his seat. It was a sumptuous Portuguese Renaissance palace in the Alentejo province of Portugal.

== Royal favour ==
Later in 1498, King Manuel I was to go on a diplomatic journey to Castile. This was shortly after Portugal had witnessed a succession crisis, and the King, who had no heirs, saw to it that Parliament (the Cortes) named Jaime, son of his sister Isabella of Viseu, as heir presumptive to the throne of Portugal.

Duke Jaime married Leonor Pérez de Guzmán, daughter of Juan Alfonso Pérez de Guzmán, 3rd Duke of Medina Sidonia. She was murdered in 1512 by order of Jaime who suspected her of adultery. King Manuel I decided that his nephew Jaime, in order to escape imprisonment for this crime, would have to prepare and fully finance a fleet to conquer the city of Azamor, on the Moroccan Atlantic coast. The city was easily conquered by the Duke's forces and he returned to Portugal forgiven and a hero.

== Marriages and children ==
In 1500, Jaime of Braganza had married Leonor Pérez de Guzmán, daughter of Juan Alfonso Pérez de Guzmán, 3rd Duke of Medina Sidonia. They had two children before she was murdered in 1512.

Name	Birth	Death	Notes
Isabella of Braganza	1510	16 September 1576	Married Duarte I, Duke of Guimarães
Teodósio I of Braganza	1503	22 September 1563	12th Count of Barcelos, 9th Count of Ourém, 6th Count of Arraiolos and Neiva, 5th Duke of Braganza, 4th Marquis of Vila Viçosa

In 1520, Jaime I married Joana of Mendoça, daughter of Diogo of Mendonça, High-Alcaide of Mourão. They had eight children, most of whom lead successful lives.

Name	Birth	Death	Notes
Joana of Braganza	1521	1588	Married Bernardino de Cardenas, 3rd Marquis of Elche
Jaime of Braganza	1523	1562	Clergyman
Eugénia of Braganza	1525	1559	Married Francisco de Melo, 2nd Marquis of Ferreira
Maria of Braganza	1527	1586	Abbess at the Monastery of the Five Wounds of Vila Viçosa
Constantino of Braganza	1528	1575	7th Viceroy of India, 9th Captain of Ribeira Grande
Fulgêncio of Braganza	1529	1582	Grand-Prior of the Collegiate of Guimarães
Teotónio of Braganza	1530	1602	Archbishop of Évora, Bishop of Fez, parliamentary member of the Portuguese Cortes of Tomar (1581) and Lisbon (1583)
Vicência of Braganza	1532	1603	Abbess at the Monastery of the Five Wounds of Vila Viçosa

== Ancestry ==
Ancestors of Jaime, Duke of Braganza

8. Afonso, Duke of Braganza
4. Fernando I, Duke of Braganza
9. Beatriz Pereira de Alvim
2. Fernando II, Duke of Braganza
10. João de Castro, 2nd Lord of Cadaval
5. Joana de Castro, 3rd Lady of Cadaval
11. Leonor da Cunha
1. Jaime, Duke of Braganza
12. Edward, King of Portugal
6. Ferdinand, Duke of Viseu
13. Eleanor of Aragon
3. Isabel of Viseu
14. John, Constable of Portugal
7. Beatrice of Portugal
15. Isabel of Barcelos

== See also ==
- List of dukes of Braganza

Jaime, Duke of Braganza House of Braganza Cadet branch of the House of Aviz Born: 1479 Died: 1532
Portuguese nobility
Preceded by Fernando II	Duke of Braganza and Guimarães; Marquis of Vila Viçosa; Count of Barcelos, Ourém, Neiva, and Arraiolos; 1498–1532	Succeeded by Teodósio I
