= List of dukes of Braganza =

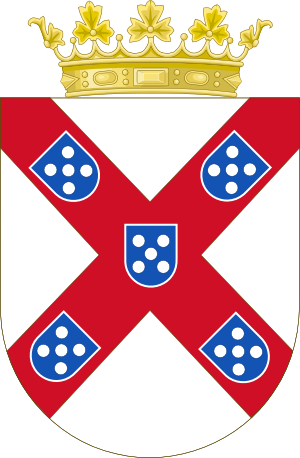
Coat of arms of the dukes of Braganza

The following is a list of dukes of Braganza, one of the most important noble titles, and later royal title, in the Kingdom of Portugal.

== List of dukes of Braganza ==
Note: The blue shade means that the person was not officially created Duke of Braganza, the person only claimed the title.

=== Before accession to the throne ===
Name	Picture	Birth	Became Duke	Ceased to be Duke	Death	Other titles	Marriages
Afonso, Duke of Braganza		4 August 1377; Illegitimate son of King John I	1443	15 December 1461		8th Count of Barcelos, 2nd Count of Neiva	Beatriz Pereira de Alvim; Constance de Noronha
Fernando I, Duke of Braganza		4 August 1403; Second son of Duke Afonso I	15 December 1461	1 April 1478		1st Marquis of Vila Viçosa, 5th Count of Ourém, 9th Count of Barcelos, 3rd Count of Arraiolos, 3rd Count of Neiva	Joana de Castro
Fernando II, Duke of Braganza		1430; Eldest son of Duke Fernando I	1 April 1478	20 June 1483		1st Duke of Guimarães, 2nd Marquis of Vila Viçosa, 10th Count of Barcelos, 6th Count of Ourém, 4th Count of Arraiolos, 4th Count of Neiva, 1st Count of Guimarães	Doña Leonor de Menezes; Infanta Isabella of Viseu
Jaime I, Duke of Braganza		1479; Eldest son of Duke Fernando II	20 June 1483	20 September 1532		Prince of Portugal, 2nd Duke of Guimarães, 3rd Marquis of Vila Viçosa, 11th Count of Barcelos, 8th Count of Ourém, 5th Count of Arraiolos, 5th Count of Neiva	Eleonor of Mendoza; Joana of Mendoza
Teodósio I, Duke of Braganza		1510; Eldest son of Duke Jaime I	20 September 1532	22 September 1563		3rd Duke of Guimarães, 4th Marquis of Vila Viçosa, 12th Count of Barcelos, 6th Count of Arraiolos, 9th Count of Ourém, 6th Count of Neiva	Isabel of Lencastre; Beatriz of Lencastre
João I, Duke of Braganza		1543; Eldest son of Duke Teodósio I	22 September 1563	1583		1st Duke of Barcelos, 5th Marquis of Vila Viçosa, 13th Count of Barcelos, 10th Count of Ourém, 7th Count of Arraiolos, 7th Count of Neiva	Infanta Catherine of Guimarães
Teodósio II, Duke of Braganza		28 April 1568; Eldest son of Duke John I	1583	29 November 1630		2nd Duke of Barcelos, 6th Marquis of Vila Viçosa, 14th Count of Barcelos, 11th Count of Ourém, 8th Count of Arraiolos, 8th Count of Neiva	Ana de Velasco y Girón
John IV of Portugal (João II as Duke)		18 March 1603; Eldest son of Duke Teodósio II	29 November 1630	1 December 1640 became King	6 November 1656	King of Portugal and the Algarves, 6th Duke of Guimarães, 3rd Duke of Barcelos, 7th Marquis of Vila Viçosa, 15th Count of Barcelos, 12th Count of Ourém, 9th Count of Arraiolos, 9th Count of Neiva	Luisa of Medina-Sidonia

=== As first in line to the throne of Portugal ===
Name	Picture	Birth	Became Duke	Ceased to be Duke	Death	Other titles	Marriages
Teodósio		8 February 1634 eldest son of King John IV	1 December 1640	13 May 1653		Prince of Portugal, Prince of Brazil, 4th Duke of Barcelos, 8th Marquis of Vila Viçosa, 16th Count of Barcelos, 13th Count of Ourém, 10th Count of Arraiolos, 10th Count of Neiva	none
Afonso		21 August 1643; 3rd son of King John IV	13 May 1653	6 November 1656 became King	12 September 1683	King of Portugal and the Algarves, Prince of Brazil, 5th Duke of Barcelos, 9th Marquis of Vila Viçosa, 17th Count of Barcelos, 14th Count of Ourém, 11th Count of Arraiolos, 11th Count of Neiva	Maria Francisca of Savoy
Isabel Luísa		6 January 1669 eldest child of King Peter II	12 September 1683	30 August 1688	21 October 1690	Princess of Brazil, Princess of Beira, Duchess of Barcelos, Marchioness of Vila Viçosa, Countess of Barcelos, Countess of Ourém, Countess of Arraiolos, Countess of Neiva	none
Isabel Luísa		6 January 1669 eldest child of King Peter II	17 September 1688	22 October 1689	21 October 1690	Princess of Brazil, Princess of Beira, Duchess of Barcelos, Marchioness of Vila Viçosa, Countess of Barcelos, Countess of Ourém, Countess of Arraiolos, Countess of Neiva	none
João		30 August 1688 eldest son of King Peter II		17 September 1688		Prince of Brazil, Marquis of Vila Viçosa, Count of Barcelos, Count of Ourém, Count of Arraiolos, Count of Neiva	none
João		22 October 1689; 2nd son of King Peter II		9 December 1706 became King	31 July 1750	King of Portugal and the Algarves, Prince of Brazil, Marquis of Vila Viçosa, Count of Barcelos, Count of Ourém, Count of Arraiolos, Count of Neiva	Maria Anna of Austria
Maria Bárbara		4 December 1711 eldest child of King John V	4 December 1711	19 October 1712	27 August 1758	Princess of Brazil, Duchess of Barcelos, Marchioness of Vila Viçosa, Countess of Barcelos, Countess of Ourém, Countess of Arraiolos, Countess of Neiva	Ferdinand VI of Spain
Pedro		19 October 1712 eldest son of King John V		29 October 1714		Prince of Brazil, Duke of Barcelos, Marquis of Vila Viçosa, Count of Barcelos, Count of Ourém, Count of Arraiolos, Count of Neiva	Maria Francisca of Savoy
José		6 June 1714; 2nd son of King John V	29 October 1714	31 July 1750 became King	24 February 1777	King of Portugal and the Algarves, Prince of Brazil, Duke of Barcelos, Marquis of Vila Viçosa, Count of Barcelos, Count of Ourém, Count of Arraiolos, Count of Neiva	Mariana Victoria of Spain
Maria Francisca		17 December 1734 eldest child of King Joseph I	31 July 1750	24 February 1777 became Queen	20 March 1816	Queen of Portugal and the Algarves, Princess of Brazil, Princess of Beira, Duchess of Barcelos, Marchioness of Vila Viçosa, Countess of Barcelos, Countess of Ourém, Countess of Arraiolos, Countess of Neiva	Peter III of Portugal
José		20 August 1761 eldest son of Queen Maria I	24 February 1777	11 September 1788		Prince of Brazil, Prince of Beira, Duke of Barcelos, Marquis of Vila Viçosa, Count of Barcelos, Count of Ourém, Count of Arraiolos, Count of Neiva	Infanta Benedita of Portugal
João		13 May 1767 youngest son of Queen Maria I	11 September 1788	20 March 1816 became King	10 March 1826	King of Portugal and the Algarves, Prince of Brazil, Marquis of Vila Viçosa, Count of Barcelos, Count of Ourém, Count of Arraiolos, Count of Neiva	Charlotte of Spain
Pedro de Alcântara		12 October 1798; 2nd son of King John VI	20 March 1816	October 12, 1822 became Emperor		Emperor of Brazil, King of Portugal and the Algarves, Prince Royal of the United Kingdom of Portugal, Brazil and the Algarves, Prince of Beira, Duke of Barcelos, Marquis of Vila Viçosa, Count of Barcelos, Count of Ourém, Count of Arraiolos, Count of Neiva	Maria Leopoldina of Austria; Amélia of Leuchtenberg
Pedro de Alcântara		12 October 1798; 2nd son of King John VI	7 April 1831 after abdication used as style	24 September 1834		Emperor of Brazil, King of Portugal and the Algarves, Prince Royal of the United Kingdom of Portugal, Brazil and the Algarves, Prince of Beira, Duke of Barcelos, Marquis of Vila Viçosa, Count of Barcelos, Count of Ourém, Count of Arraiolos, Count of Neiva	Maria Leopoldina of Austria; Amélia of Leuchtenberg
Maria da Glória		4 April 1819 eldest child of Emperor Pedro I	10 March 1826	2 May 1826; Became Queen	15 November 1853	Queen of Portugal and the Algarves, Princess of Grão-Pará, Princess Imperial of Brazil, Princes of Beira, Princess of Eichstätt, Princess of Saxe-Coburg and Gotha, Duchess of Porto, Duchess of Leuchtenberg, Duchess of Santa Cruz, Duchess of Barcelos, Marchioness of Vila Viçosa, Countess of Barcelos, Countess of Ourém, Countess of Arraiolos, Countess of Neiva	Miguel I of Portugal annulled Auguste, 2nd Duke of Leuchtenberg; Ferdinand II of Portugal
Miguel I of Portugal		26 October 1802 youngest son of King John VI	6 May 1834 never created duke, used as style during his exile	14 November 1866		King of Portugal and the Algarves, Duke of Beja	Princess Adelaide of Löwenstein-Wertheim-Rosenberg
Pedro		16 December 1837 eldest son of Queen Maria II		15 November 1853 became King	11 November 1861	King of Portugal and the Algarves, Prince Royal of Portugal, Duke of Saxe-Coburg-Gotha, Duke of Barcelos, Marquis of Vila Viçosa, Count of Barcelos, Count of Ourém, Count of Arraiolos, Count of Neiva	Stephanie of Hohenzollern-Sigmaringen
Carlos		28 September 1863 eldest son of King Louis I		19 October 1889 became King	1 February 1908 assassinated	King of Portugal and the Algarves, Prince Royal of Portugal, Duke of Barcelos, Marquis of Vila Viçosa, Count of Barcelos, Count of Ourém, Count of Arraiolos, Count of Neiva	Amélie of Orléans
Luís Filipe		21 March 1887 eldest son of King Carlos I	19 October 1889	1 February 1908 assassinated		Prince Royal of Portugal, Prince of Beira, Duke of Barcelos, Marquis of Vila Viçosa, Count of Barcelos, Count of Ourém, Count of Arraiolos, Count of Neiva	none

=== Post-monarchy use ===
Name	Picture	Birth	Claimed title	Ceased to be Duke	Death	Other titles claimed	Marriages
Miguel Januário of Braganza		19 September 1853 eldest son of King Miguel I of Portugal	4 October 1910 or 14 November 1866	31 July 1920	11 October 1927	Duke of Barcelos, Marquis of Vila Viçosa, Count of Barcelos, Count of Ourém, Count of Arraiolos, Count of Neiva	Princess Elisabeth of Thurn and Taxis; Princess Maria Theresa of Löwenstein-Wertheim-Rosenberg
Duarte Nuno of Braganza		23 September 1907; 3rd son of Miguel	31 July 1920 or 2 July 1932	24 December 1976		Duke of Barcelos, Marquis of Vila Viçosa, Count of Barcelos, Count of Ourém, Count of Arraiolos, Count of Neiva	Princess Francisca of Orléans-Braganza
Duarte Pio of Braganza		15 May 1945 eldest son of Duarte Nuno	24 December 1976	Incumbent	Living	Prince of Beira, Duke of Barcelos, Duke of Guimarães, Marquis of Vila Viçosa, Count of Barcelos, Count of Ourém, Count of Arraiolos, Count of Neiva	Isabel de Herédia

The Miguelist heir apparent, claiming the title of Prince of Beira, is Afonso de Santa Maria (b. 1996).

== See also ==
- Duke of Braganza
- Portuguese nobility
- Duke of Barcelos
- Duke of Guimarães
- List of Portuguese monarchs
- Dukedoms in Portugal
- Kings of Portugal family tree
- House of Braganza
- Timeline of Portuguese history
- Duchess of Braganza

== Bibliography ==
- "Nobreza de Portugal e Brasil", Vol. II, pages 433/449. Published by Zairol Lda., 1989, Lisbon.
