= List of titles and honours of the Portuguese Crown =

This list of titles and honours of the Portuguese Crown sets out the many titles of the monarchs of the Kingdom of Portugal while the monarchy was still in place.

== Titles held by the monarch of Kingdom of Portugal ==
Note: Titles marked with * are titles that were no longer used or held at the time of the deposition of the monarchy in Portugal in 1910. Titles marked with " are titles that were personally held by the Portuguese monarch:

=== Kingdoms ===
- King of the United Kingdom of Portugal, Brazil, and the Algarves*
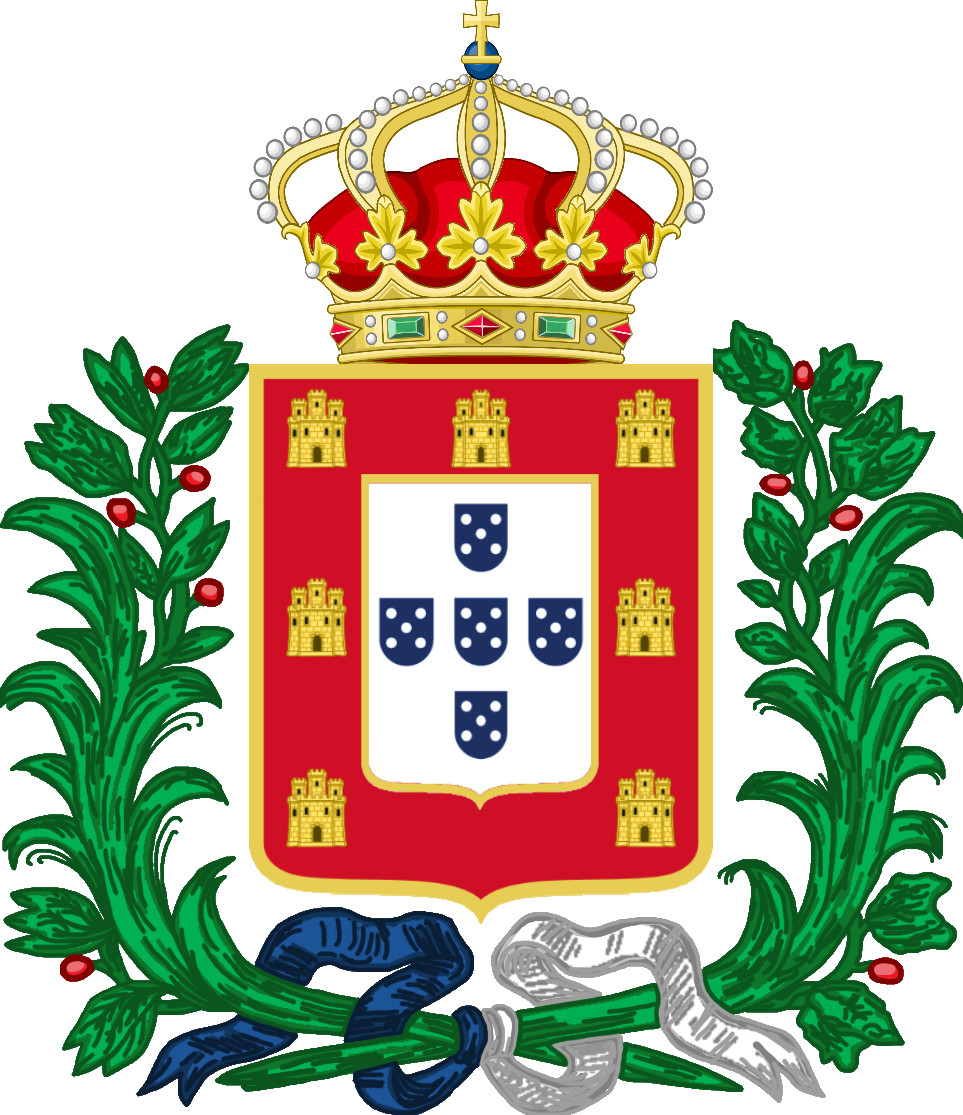
- King of Portugal
- King of the Algarves
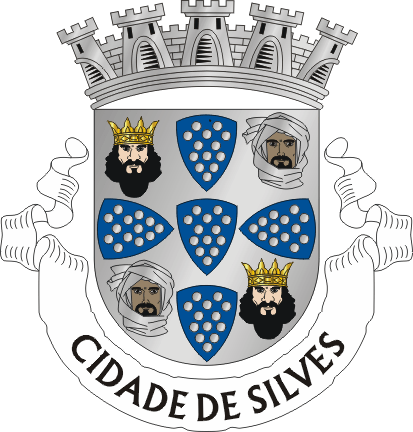
- King of Silves*

=== Principalities ===
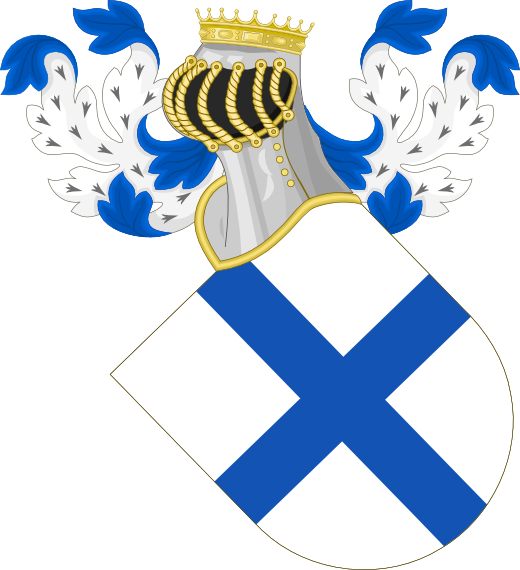
- Prince of the Portuguese*

=== Duchies ===
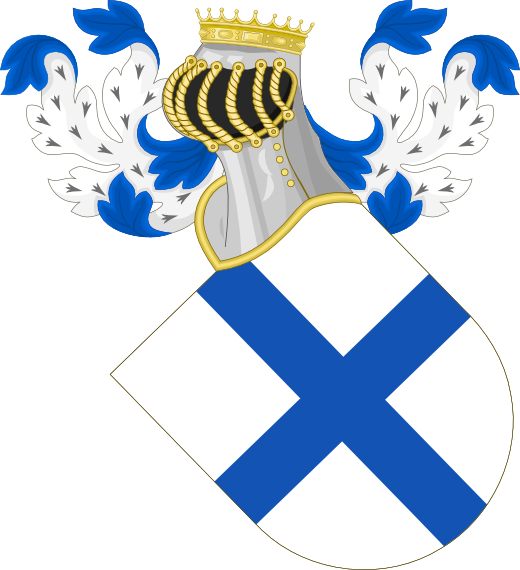
- Duke of Portugal*

=== Counties ===
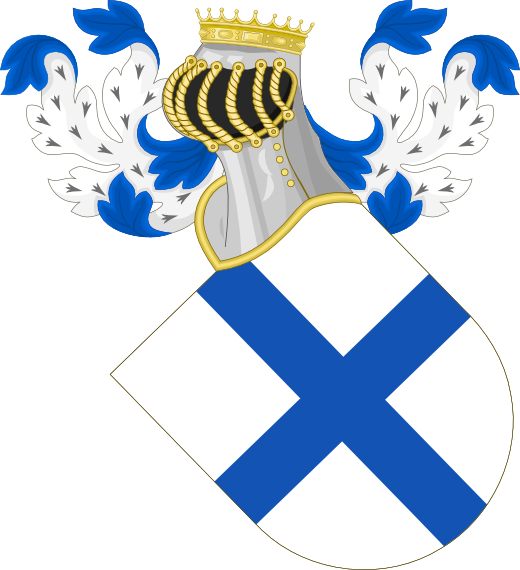
- Count of Portugal*

=== Lordships ===
- Lord of Ceuta*
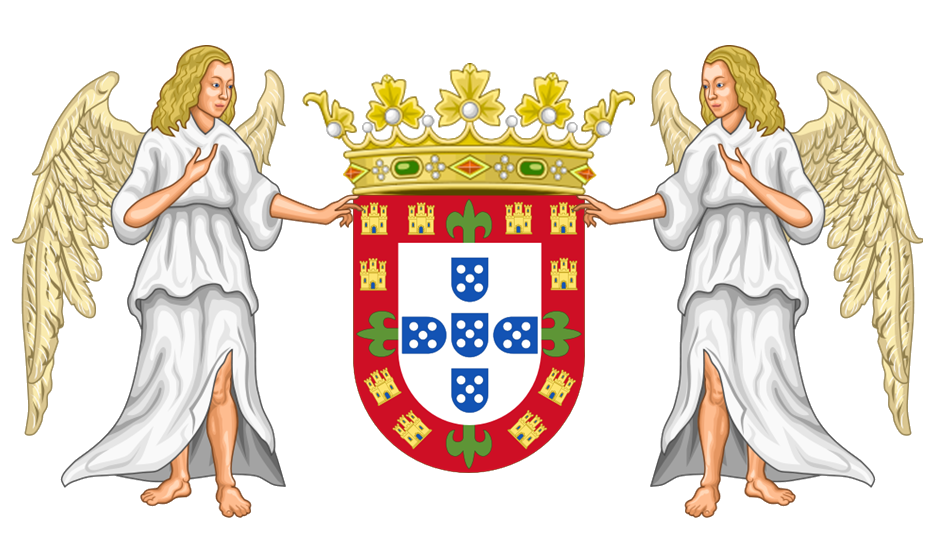
- Lord of Alcácer in Africa*
- Lord of Guinea

== Titles held by the heir apparent of the Kingdom of Portugal ==
Note: Titles marked with * are titles that were not still used or still held at the time of the deposition of the monarchy in Portugal in 1910.

=== Principalities ===
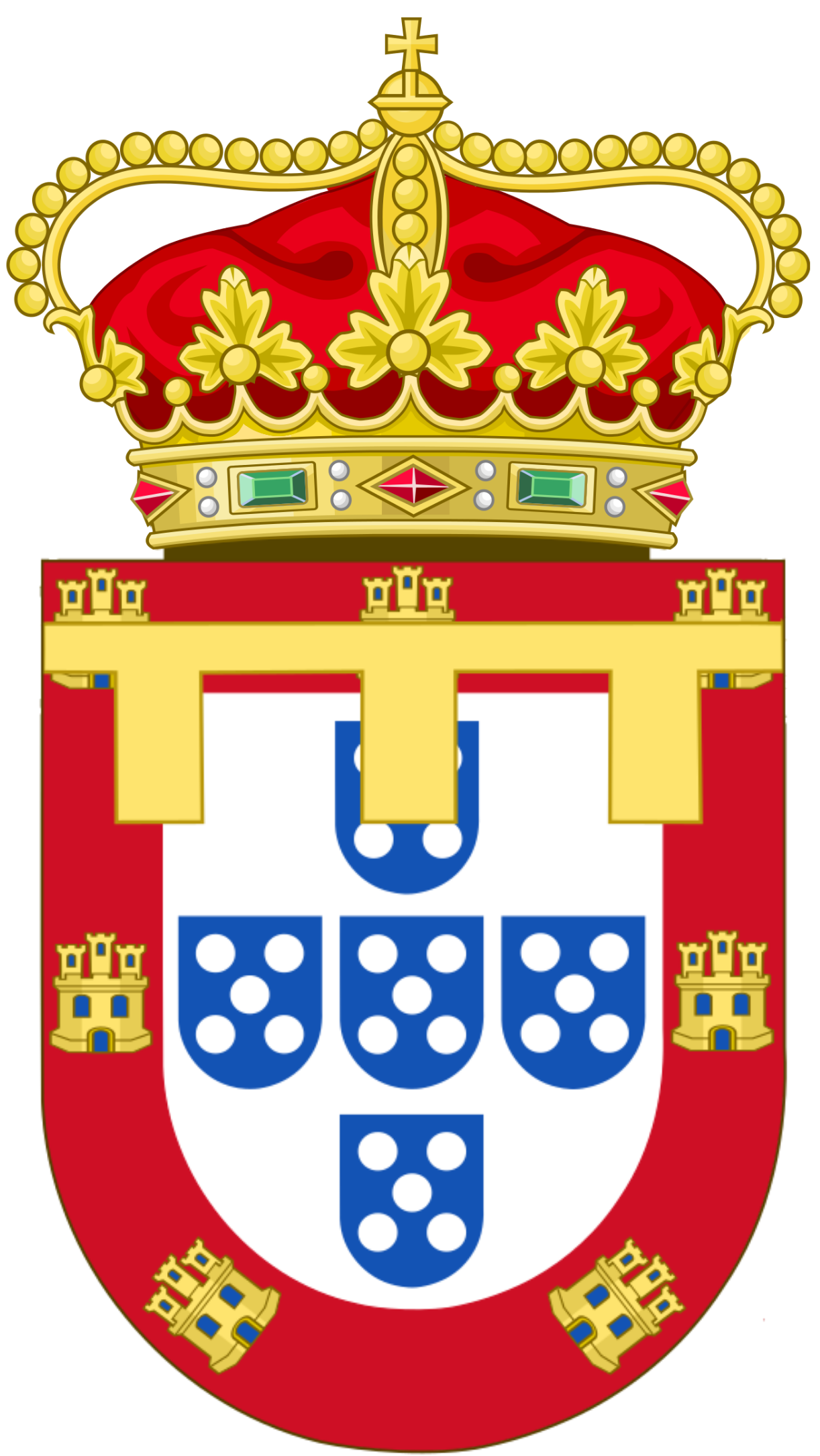
- Prince of Portugal*
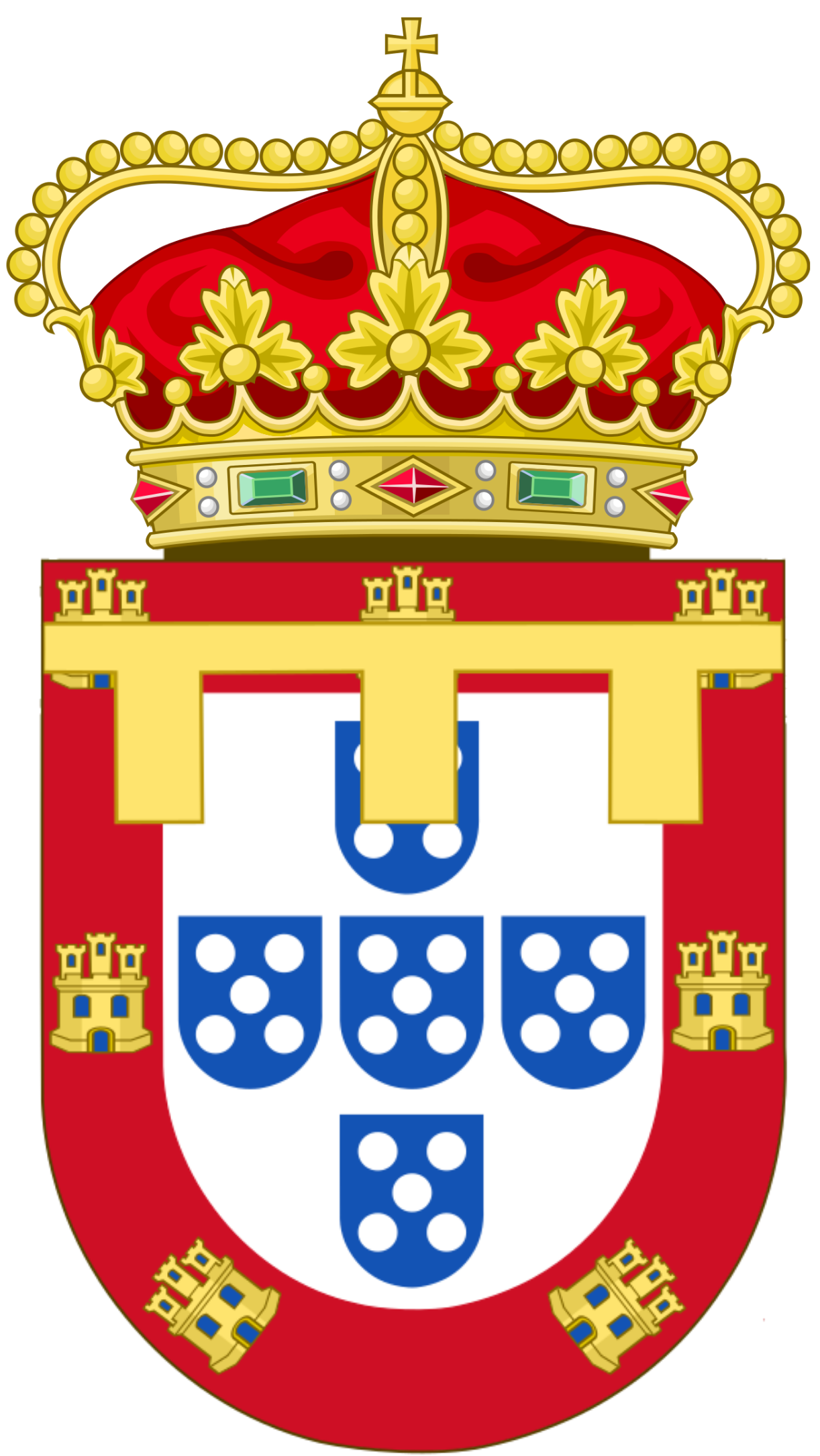
- Prince of Brazil*
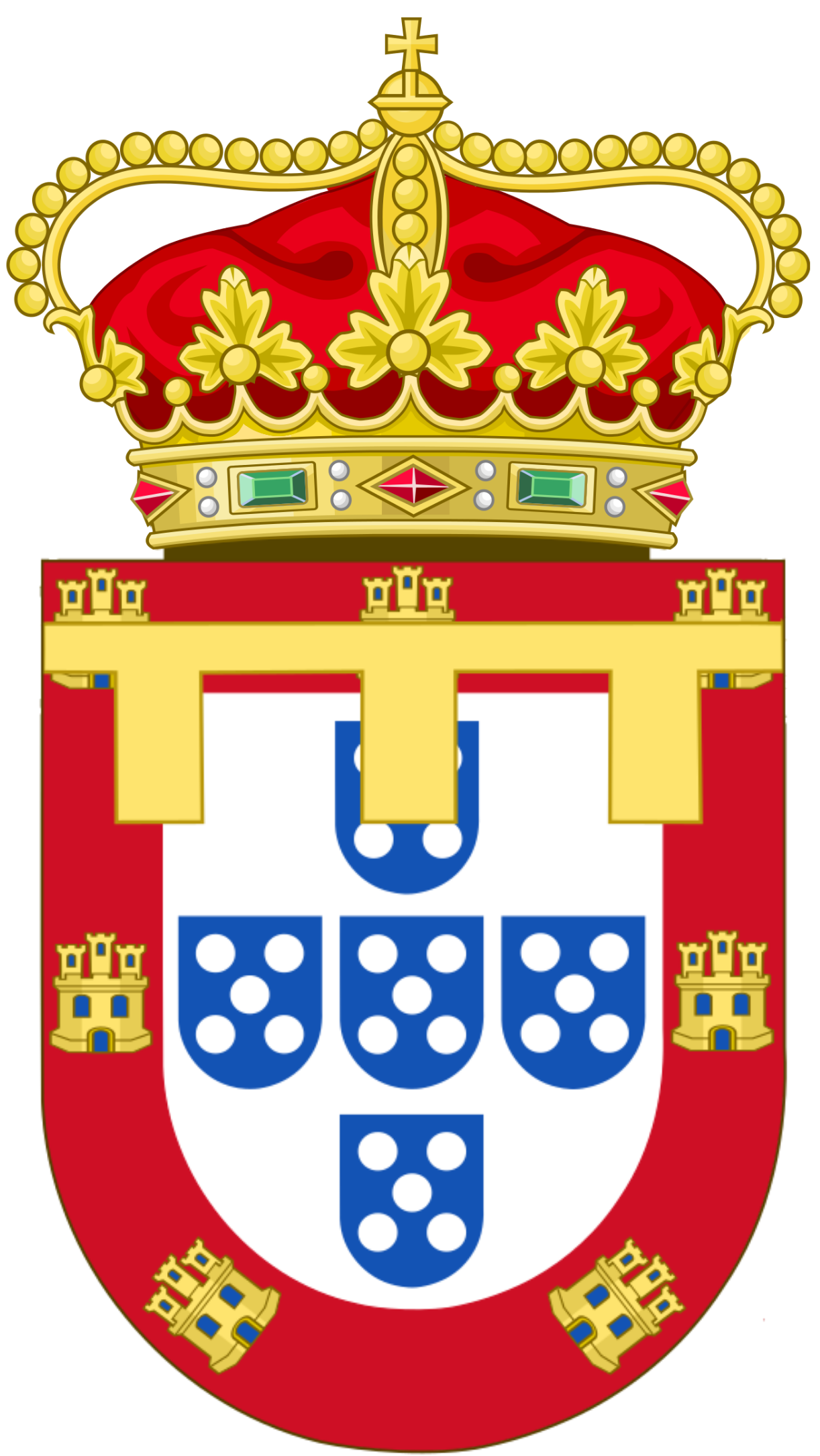
- Prince Royal of the United Kingdom of Portugal, Brazil, and the Algarves*
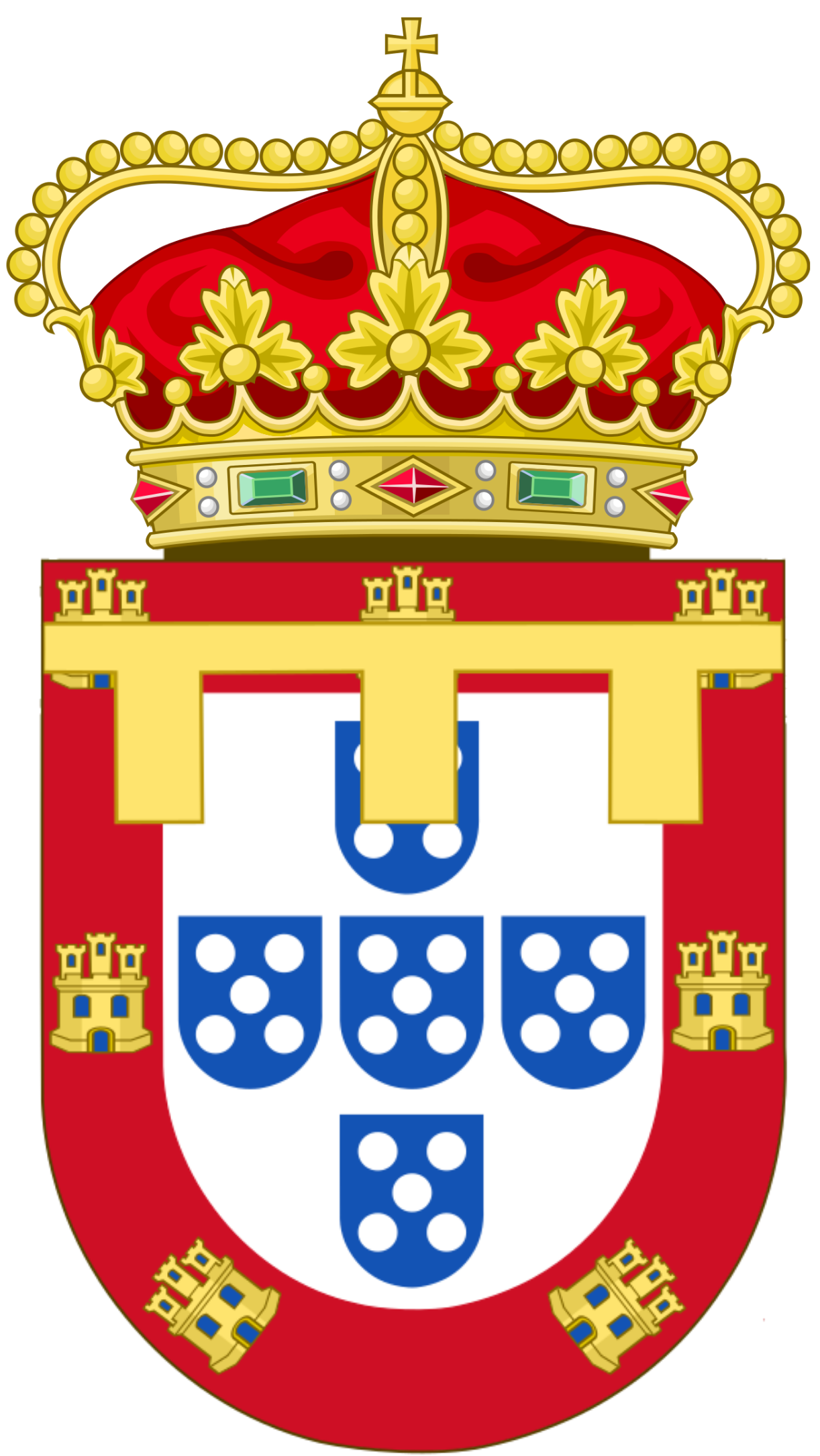
- Prince Royal of Portugal and the Algarves

=== Duchies ===
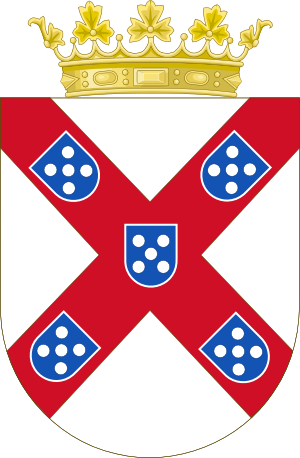
- Duke of Braganza
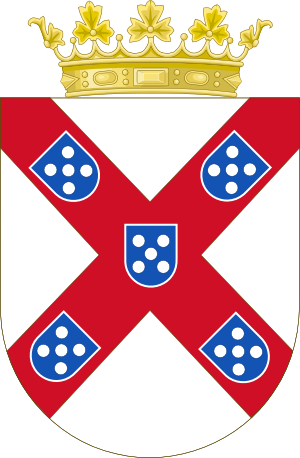
- Duke of Guimarães

=== Marquessates ===
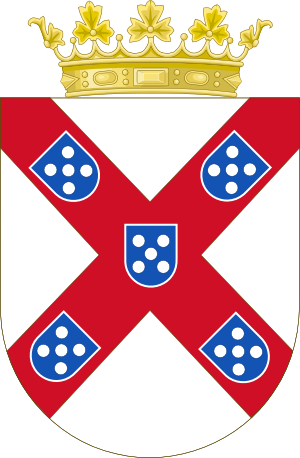
- Marquis of Vila Viçosa

=== Counties ===
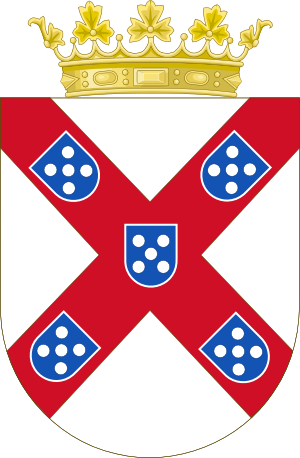
- Count of Guimarães
- Count of Arraiolos
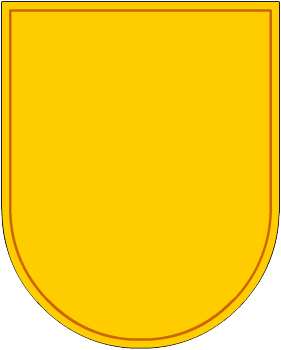
- Count of Ourém
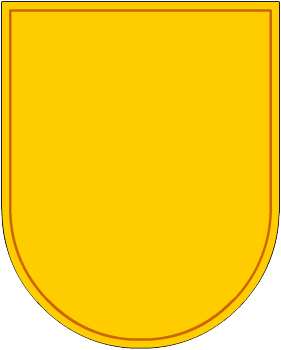
- Count of Neiva
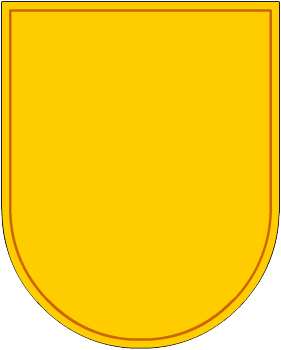
- Count of Faria

=== Hereditary Orders ===
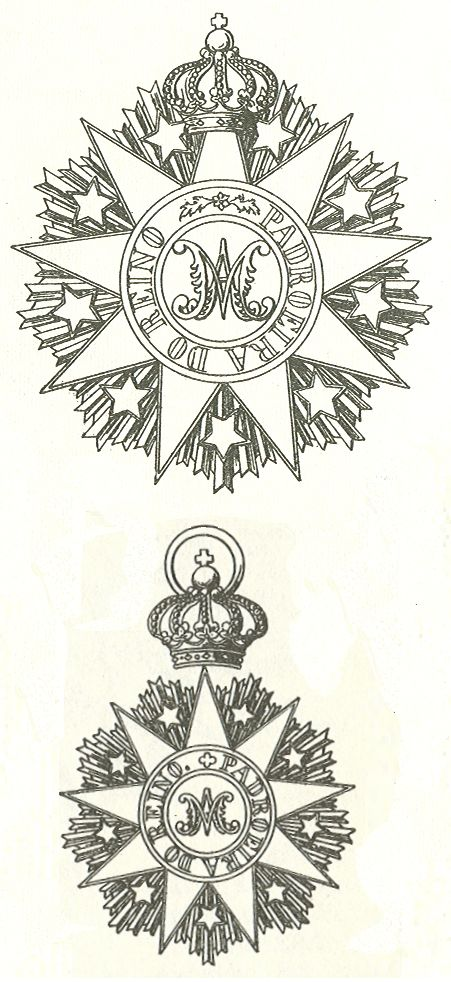
- Grand Master of the Order of the Immaculate Conception of Vila Viçosa
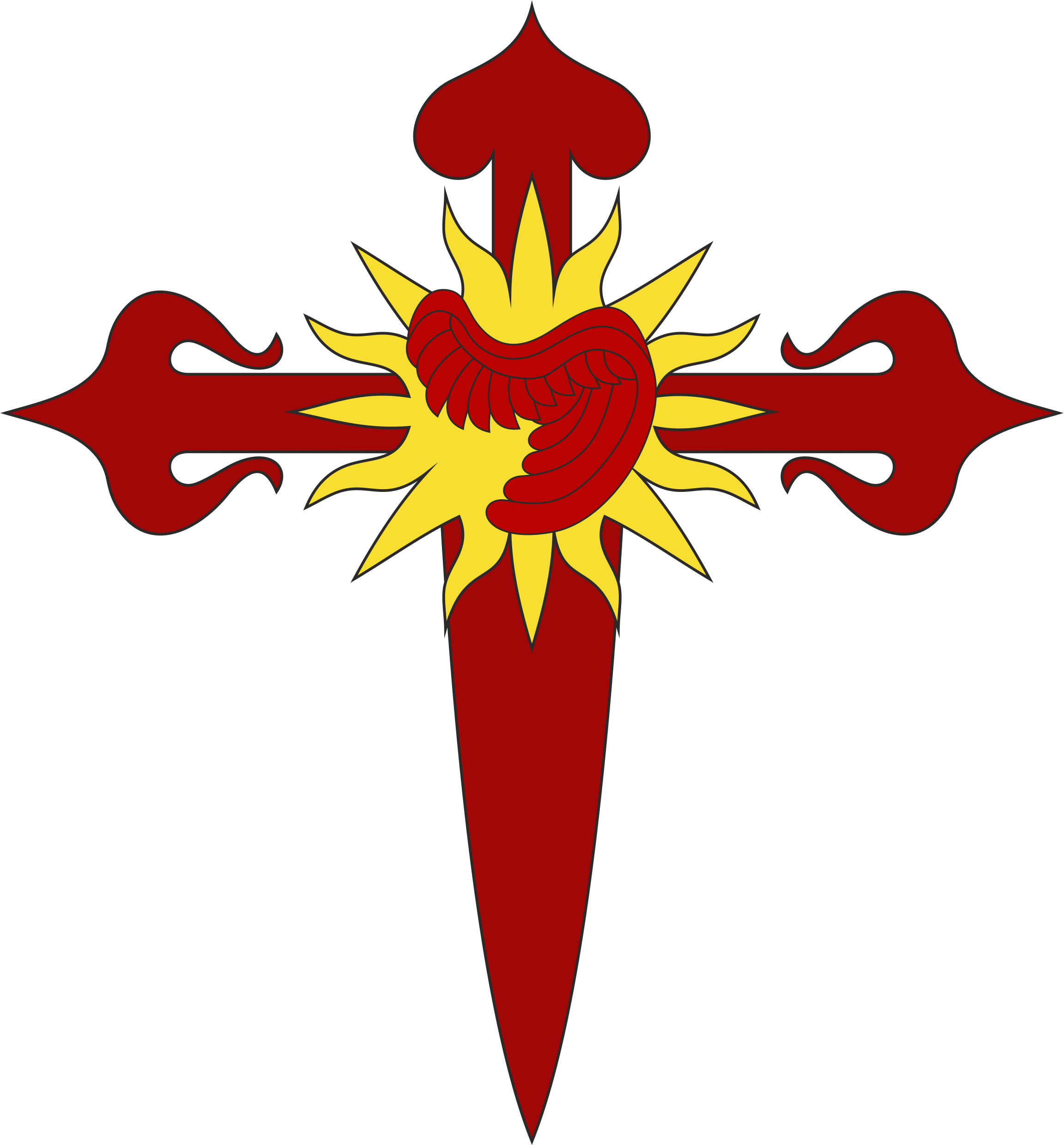
- Grand Master of the Order of Saint Michael of the Wing
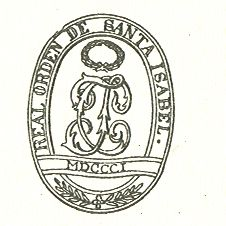
- Grand Mistress of the Order of Saint Isabel

== Titles held by the heir apparent to the heir apparent of the Kingdom of Portugal ==
=== Principalities ===
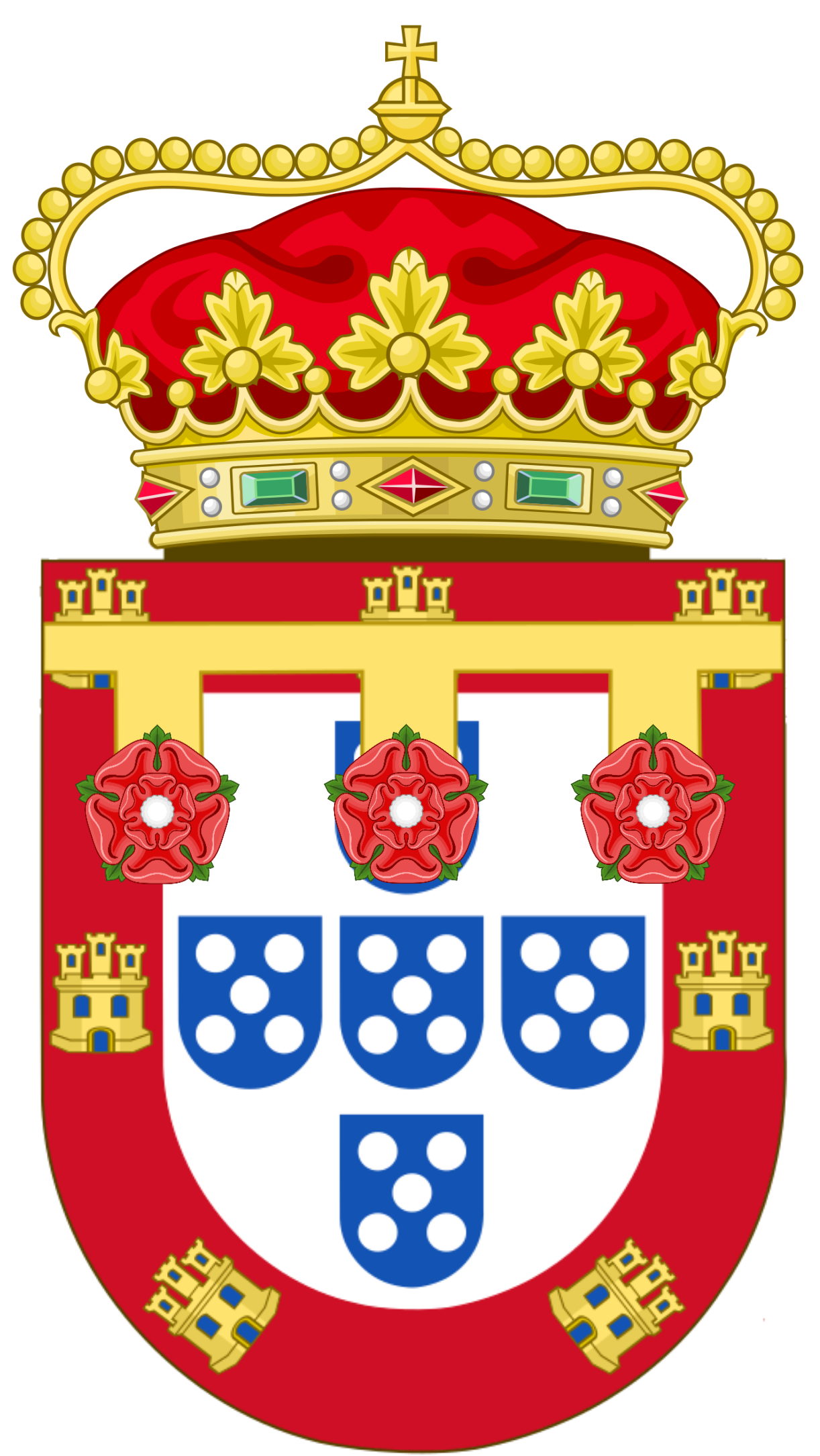
- Prince of Beira

=== Duchies ===
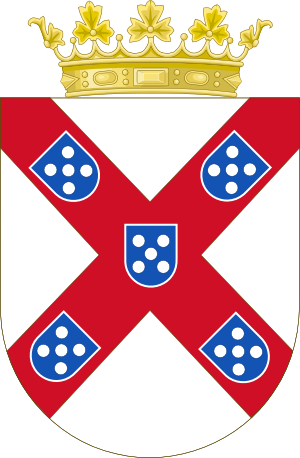
- Duke of Barcelos

=== Counties ===
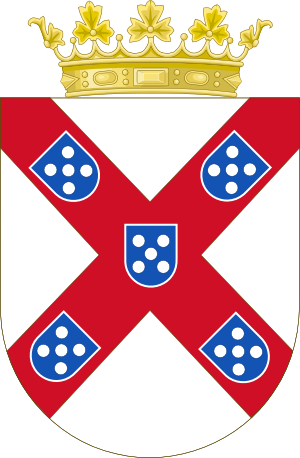
- Count of Barcelos

== See also ==
- Style of the Portuguese sovereign
- Kingdom of Portugal
- Portuguese Empire
- Portuguese nobility

== Sources ==
- Titles held by the heir to the throne of Portugal (In Portuguese)
- Titles held by the heir to the heir of the throne of Portugal (In Portuguese)
