= Princess Royal of Portugal =

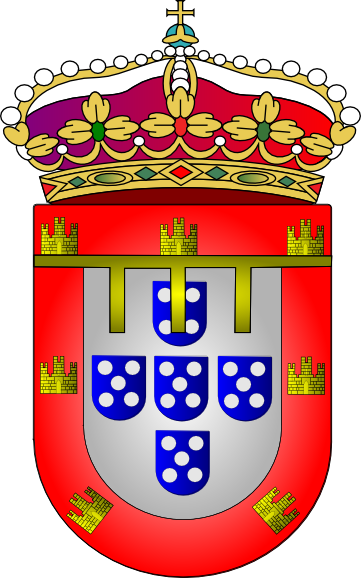

This is a list of Princesses Royal of Portugal (or more formally Princess Royal of the Kingdom of Portugal and the Algarves). The title is, since 1815, carried either in her own right by the heiress to the throne, as a substantive title, or by the wife of the heir to the throne, the Prince Royal of Portugal, as a courtesy title. It was preceded by the titles Princess of Brazil and Princess of Portugal.

The title was created in 1815 when John VI (at the time Prince-Regent) elevated colonial Brazil to the status of kingdom inside the United Kingdom of Portugal, Brazil and the Algarves (thus forcing the extinction of the until then used title Prince of Brazil). The heir became the Princess Royal of the United Kingdom of Portugal, Brazil and the Algarves. When Brazil declared its independence, the title was changed to the current state.

The holders of the title were styled Royal Highness (HRH) and were also Duchesses of Braganza, Duchesses of Guimarães, Duchesses of Barcelos, Marchioness of Vila Viçosa, Countess of Arraiolos, Countess of Ourém, Countess of Barcelos, Countess of Faria, Countess of Neiva and Countess of Guimarães.

== Princess Royal of Portugal ==
=== By birth ===
This is a list of Princess Royal of Portugal who held the title by their own rights:

Note: Lighter shade of blue means that the person was not titled Princess Royal, being only the first in the line of succession. After 1834, Princes Royal needed to be officially sworn as such in Parliament to legally bear the title.

Picture	Name	Heiress of	Birth	Became heiress to the throne	Ceased to be Princess Royal of Portugal	Death
	Princess Januária	Maria II	11 March 1822	2 May 1826 sister's accession as Queen regnant	23 June 1828 sister's deposition and uncle's accession as King	13 March 1901
	Princess Maria Teresa	Miguel I	29 April 1793	23 June 1828 brother's accession as King	26 May 1834 brother's deposition and niece's accession and restoration as Queen regnant	17 January 1874
	Princess Januária	Maria II	11 March 1822	26 May 1834 sister's restoration as Queen regnant	16 December 1837 nephew's birth	13 March 1901

=== By marriage ===
This is a list of Princess Royal of Portugal who held the title by their marriage to the Prince Royal of Portugal:

Note: Lighter shade of blue means that the person was not titled Princess Royal, being only wife of the person first in the line of succession.

Picture	Name	Father	Birth	Marriage	Became Princess	Ceased to be Princess	Death	Spouse
	Infanta Carlota of Spain	Charles IV of Spain (Bourbon)	25 April 1775	8 May 1785	16 December 1815 former title of Princess of Brazil dropped	20 March 1816 became Queen	7 December 1830	Prince João
	Archduchess Maria Leopoldina of Austria	Francis II, Holy Roman Emperor (Habsburg-Lorraine)	22 January 1797	6 November 1817		26 March 1826 became Queen	11 December 1826	Prince Pedro
	Princess Amélie of Orléans	Prince Philippe, Count of Paris (Bourbon-Orléans)	28 September 1865	22 May 1886		19 October 1889 became Queen	25 October 1951	Prince Carlos
In Pretense
	Nevada Stoody Hayes	Jacob Walter Stoody	21 October 1885	26 September 1917		21 February 1920; Husband's death	11 January 1941	Infante Afonso

== See also ==
- List of Portuguese consorts
- Princess of Portugal
- Princess of Brazil
- Princess of Beira
