= House of Braganza-Saxe-Coburg and Gotha =

Former Royal House of Portugal

House of Braganza-Saxe-Coburg and Gotha Casa de Bragança-Saxe-Coburgo-Gota
- Parent house: Saxe-Coburg and Gotha-Koháry (agnatic); Braganza (enatic)
- Country: Kingdom of Portugal, Empire of Brazil
- Founded: April 9, 1836; 190 years ago
- Founder: Ferdinand II; Maria II
- Final ruler: Manuel II
- Titles: List: King of Portugal; King of the Algarve; Prince Royal of Portugal; Prince of Beira; Prince of Saxe-Coburg and Gotha; Infante of Portugal; Duke of Braganza; Duke of Guimarães; Duke of Barcelos; Duke of Porto; Duke of Beja; Duke of Coimbra; Duke of Saxony; Marquis of Vila Viçosa; Count of Guimarães; Count of Barcelos; Count of Arraiolos; Count of Ourém; Count of Neiva
- Dissolution: July 2, 1932; 94 years ago (death of Manuel II)
- Deposition: 5 October 1910

The House of Braganza-Saxe-Coburg and Gotha (also known as the House of Saxe-Coburg-Braganza or the Constitutional Branch of the Braganzas) is a term used to categorize the last four rulers of the Kingdom of Portugal, and their families, from 1853 until the declaration of the republic in 1910. Its name derives from the four kings descended in a patrilineal line from King Ferdinand II of Portugal (of the House of Saxe-Coburg and Gotha-Koháry) and in a matrilineal line from Queen Maria II of Portugal (of the House of Braganza).

The designation Braganza-Saxe-Coburg and Gotha is prevalent mainly in the writings of non-Portuguese historians and genealogists, as European custom classifies a descendant branch on the basis of patrilineal descent, which means that the House of Braganza-Saxe-Coburg and Gotha is a cadet branch of the House of Saxe-Coburg and Gotha-Koháry.

Nonetheless, the 1838 Portuguese constitution stated that the House of Braganza was the ruling house of Portugal, by way of Queen Maria II, and her descendants still continued to style themselves as members of the House of Braganza, as opposed to Saxe-Coburg-Braganza. With the death of King Manuel II without legitimate issue in 1932, the dynasty became extinct.

== History ==
The royal house was founded by Prince Ferdinand of Saxe-Coburg and Gotha, who on 9 April 1836 married Queen Maria II of Portugal. Members of the royal house held the Portuguese title of Infante/Infanta of Portugal, as well as the German titles of Prince/ss of Saxe-Coburg and Gotha and Duke/Duchess of Saxony. On 15 November 1853, Queen Maria II died, and her eldest son succeeded to the throne as Pedro V, the first king of the Braganza-Saxe-Coburg and Gotha dynasty.

The dynasty remained on the throne until the outbreak in Portugal of the 5 October 1910 revolution when King Manuel II of Portugal was deposed and the Portuguese First Republic was established. Manuel II went into exile in Fulwell Park, England, where he died on 2 July 1932.

=== Modern claims ===
Before his death in 1932, King Manuel II had been in negotiations with the rival Miguelist branch of the House of Braganza, who had claimed the Portuguese throne since 1834, in opposition to the Braganza-Saxe-Coburg and Gotha dynasty. On the King's death, the claim to the defunct throne of Portugal passed to Miguelist descendant Duarte Nuno of Braganza.

In 1932, a woman known as Maria Pia of Saxe-Coburg and Gotha Braganza claimed to be the illegitimate daughter of King Carlos I of Portugal and claimed the right to the titles of Duchess of Braganza and to be the rightful Queen of Portugal. Maria Pia claimed that King Carlos I legitimized her through a royal decree and placed her in the line of succession, however no proof was presented to demonstrate this and the King similarly did not have the personal authority to do so. Maria Pia's paternity was never proven and her claim not widely accepted.

Alexander Prinz von Sachsen, Head of the Royal House of Saxony is another possible candidate to be the heir of the House of Braganza-Saxe-Coburg and Gotha.

== Rulers ==
- Pedro V (1853–1861)
- Luís I (1861–1889)
- Carlos I (1889–1908)
- Manuel II (1908–1910)

== Family tree ==
Fernando II	Maria II
Stephanie of Hohenzollern-Sigmaringen	Pedro V	Luís I	Maria Pia of Savoy	João, Duke of Beja	Maria Anna	George, King of Saxony	Antónia	Leopold, Prince of Hohenzollern	Augusto, Duke of Coimbra
Amélie of Orléans	Carlos I	Afonso, Duke of Porto	Nevada Stoody Hayes
Prince Luís Filipe	Manuel II	Augusta Victoria of Hohenzollern-Sigmaringen

== See also ==
- List of Portuguese monarchs
- House of Loulé

*Royal House* House of Braganza-Saxe-Coburg and Gotha Cadet branch of the House of Saxe-Coburg and Gotha
Preceded by House of Braganza	Ruling House of the Kingdom of Portugal; 1853–1910	Monarchy Abolished
