= Ducal Palace of Vila Viçosa =

Ducal palace in Portugal

- Paço Ducal de Vila Viçosa
- The Palace of the Dukes of Braganza, in Vila Viçosa
- Interactive map of the Ducal Palace of Vila Viçosa area

General information
- Type: Palace
- Architectural style: Renaissance
- Location: Nossa Senhora da Conceição, Vila Viçosa Municipality, Portugal
- Coordinates: 38°46′56.80″N 7°25′18.97″W
- Opened: c. 1496
- Owner: Portuguese Republic

Technical details
- Material: Masonry

Design and construction
- Architect: Pero de Trilho

Website
- https://www.fcbraganca.pt/en/

The Ducal Palace of Vila Viçosa (Portuguese: Paço Ducal de Vila Viçosa) is a royal palace in Portugal, located in the civil parish of Nossa Senhora da Conceição, in the municipality of Vila Viçosa, in the Alentejo, situated about 150 km (93 miles) east of the capital Lisbon. It was for many centuries the seat of the House of Braganza, one of the most important noble houses in Portugal. Braganza was the ruling house of the Kingdom of Portugal from 1640 until 1910, when King Manuel II, titular head of the family, was deposed in the 5 October 1910 Revolution which brought in a Republican government.

== History ==
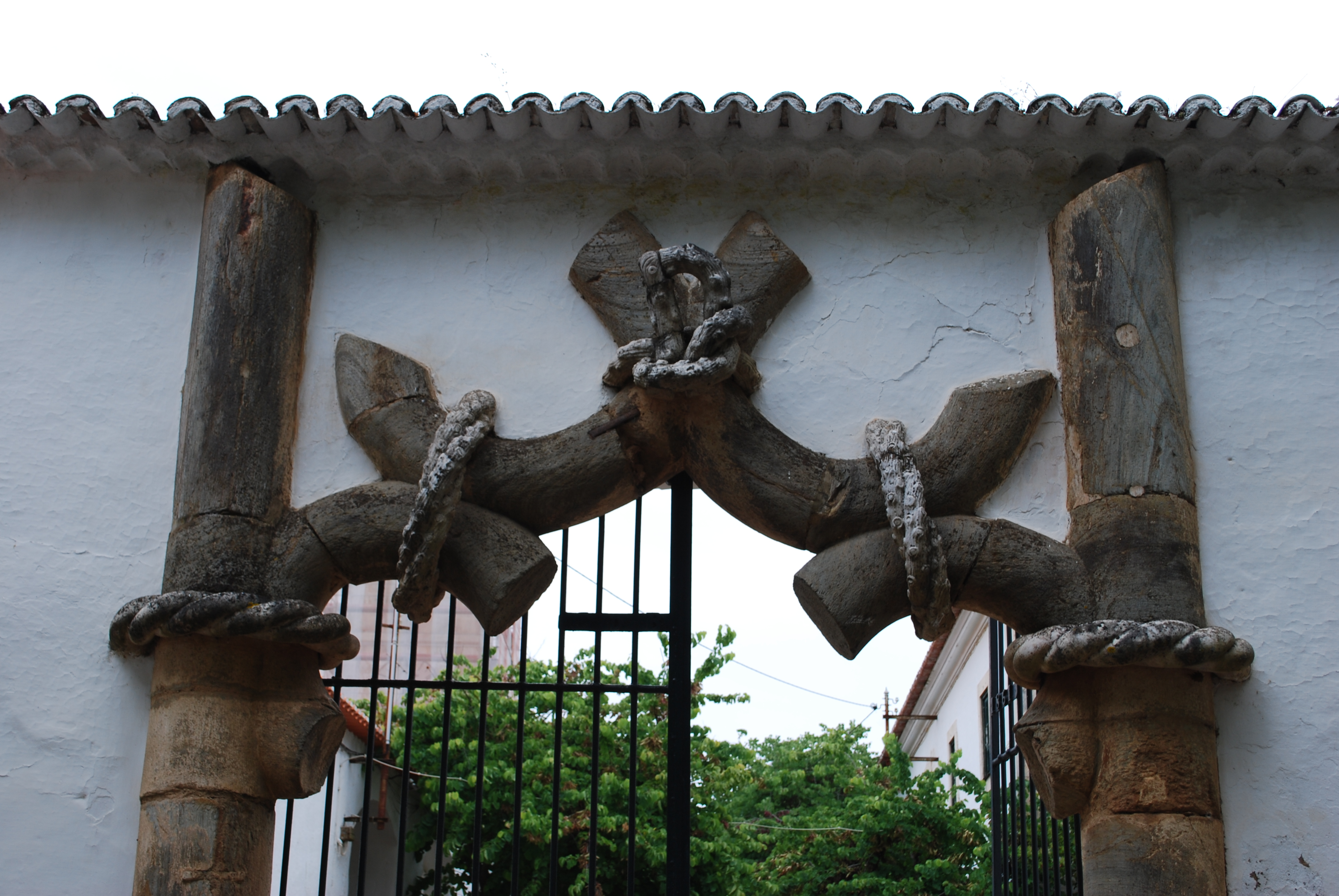
Early example of the Manueline style of the original Palace before reconstruction

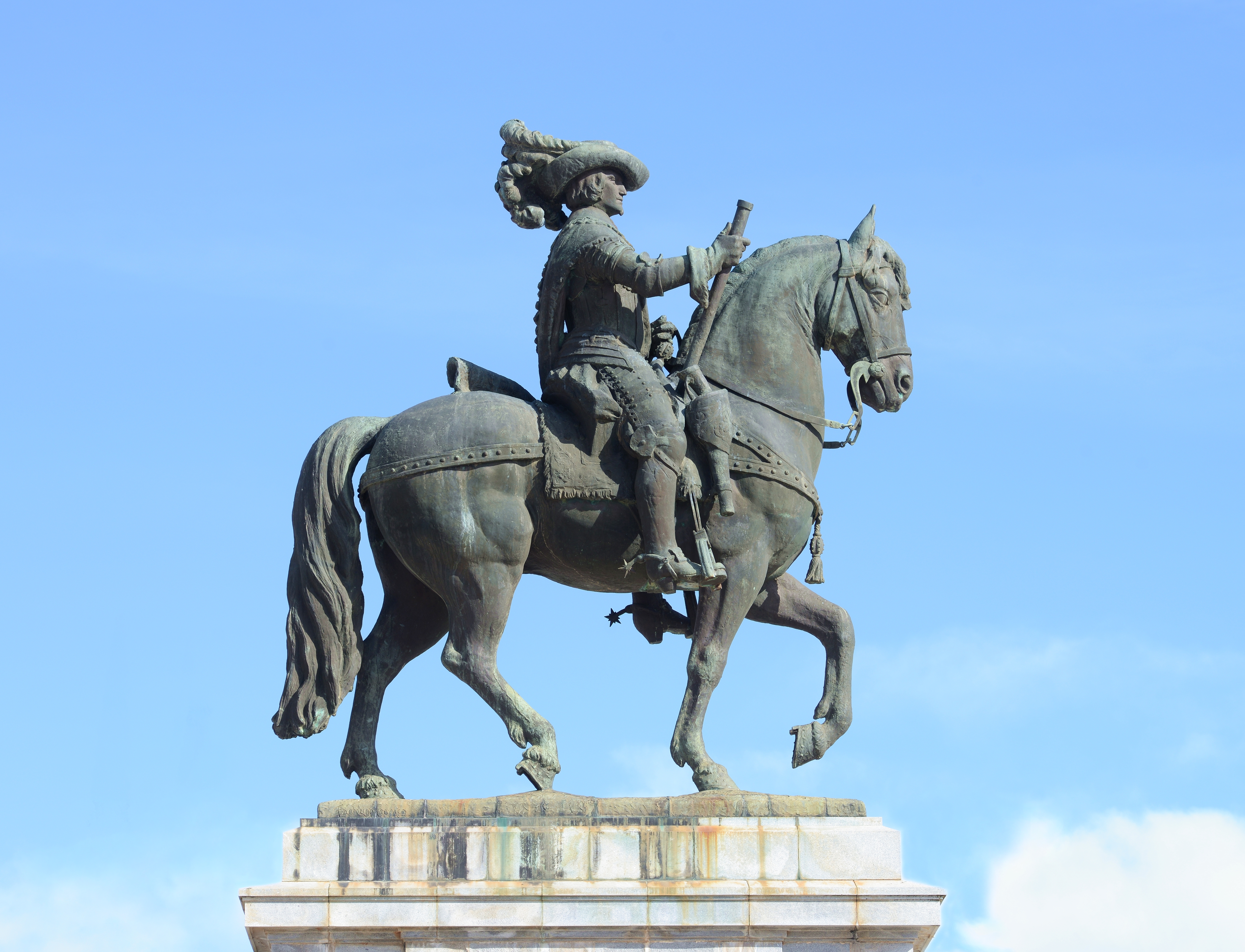
João I, 6th Duke of Braganza

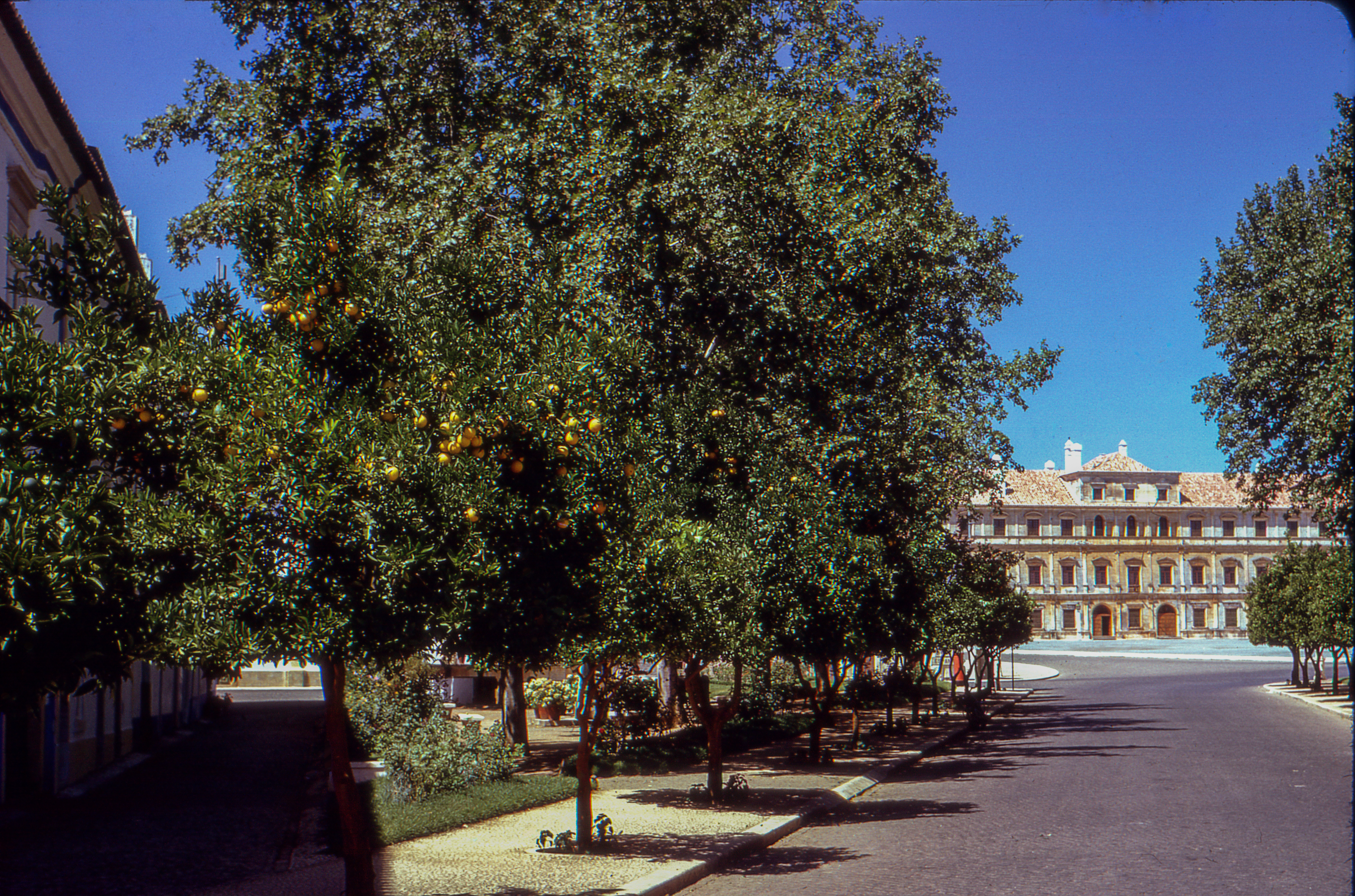
Tree-lined roadway to the palace, part of the remodelled grounds

Vila Viçosa became a fiefdom of the Dukes of Braganza when Fernando I of Braganza succeeded his father Afonso, 1st Duke of Braganza, and received the title of Count of Arraiolos from his grandfather, Nuno Alvares Pereira. Fernando I established his seat at the primitive Vila Viçosa Castle. However, following the 1483 execution of his son, Fernando II, 3rd Duke of Braganza, for treason by order of King John II of Portugal, the family was exiled to the Kingdom of Castile. Returning in 1498 (after the death of King John II in 1495), the family regained its ancestral lands, although Jaime, 4th Duke of Braganza (Fernando II's successor), declined to live in the Castle of Vila Viçosa, owing to its association with his father's betrayal and murder.

Construction of the ducal palace of the Dukes of Braganza began during the tenure of Duke Jaime of Braganza, between 1501 and 1502. It was situated in the Horta do Reguengo outside the walls of the nearby medieval village, in an area that was "characterized by extensive olive orchards and an abundance of water", presenting some similarities to the feudal residences of the region, such as the Sempre Noiva or Paço de Alvito. The House of Braganza regained much of its power and wealth over time due to Duke Jaime's close kinship with the royal family (he being the nephew of King Manuel I of Portugal) and his actions in reconciling relations between the nobles. Duke Jaime of Braganza commanded the victorious expedition to Azamor in 1513, and having secured a pardon expanded the wealth of the House of Braganza, and contributed to the growth of the ducal palace.

In 1535 Teodósio I, 5th Duke of Braganza was appointed Constable of the Kingdom. He managed to negotiate the marriage of his sister, Isabella of Braganza, with Infante Edward, 4th Duke of Guimarães (a brother of King John III of Portugal), securing a closer association with the royal family. Following the need to expand the palace for the celebrations of the royal marriage, Teodósio I began the construction of the imposing facade, faced with marble in the Italianate-style, and in 1558 began the installation of the Sala de Música (Hall of Music). As Rafael Moreira (1997) indicated, the first building was a designed and decorated in the Manueline style, and was remodelled in classical lines, along with the adjacent buildings and the expansion of the square in front of the building. It was inspired by the profile of the Ribeira Palace in Lisbon. Extensive remodeling later occurred in 1566, during the tenure of João I, 6th Duke of Braganza.

It was the 7th Duke, Teodósio II, who in 1583 began the grand works of the classical facade, completed in 1635 during the regency of King John IV of Portugal, formerly Duke of Braganza. In 1602, Teodósio II married the Spanish noblewoman Ana de Velasco y Girón, hoping to produce heirs. In commemoration of the marriage a composition of azulejo tiles by Fernando Loyaza, known as the Talavera de la Reina, was installed in the Sala Grande (Great Hall). The whole project of the classical facade was firstly executed by Nicolau de Frias, royal architect, but was later supplemented by Pedro Vaz Pereira and Manuel Pereira Alvenéo. The monumental facade was completed in the Mannerist style, consisting of two floors, one with Tuscan capitals, the other with Ionic capitals. Later, in 1610, construction began of an additional third floor. In about 1611 the fireplace in the Sala de Medusa (Medusa's Hall) was designed and constructed by Pêro Vaz Pereira. Following the 1640 ascension of João II, 8th Duke of Braganza to the throne of Portugal as King John IV, the palace lost its importance as the permanent residence of the Dukes of Braganza.

The first new remodelling to the Palace occurred in the 18th century, with the installation of an organ in the chapel. In 1716 King John V began minor renovations. Later, in 1762 under Queen Maria I of Portugal, the construction began of the main tower fronting the Duchess's Garden (or Forest Garden) and of a new wing, formally designated as the Quartos Novos (New Quarters). This included the Sala de Jantar (Dining Hall), which along with the other works, was finally completed under her successor, King Joseph I of Portugal in 1770.

During the Napoleonic invasion of the Iberian peninsula, the Portuguese royal family fled to Brazil, and the palace was closed.

Long after the return of the royal family to Portugal, King Carlos I of Portugal and his wife Amélie of Orleans began the renovations of the New Quarters, to the designs of the Frenchman Negrier, in order to serve as their residence. After a period of living in these quarters as his semi-official residence, on 1 February 1908 King Carlos I returned with his family to Lisbon, where he was later assassinated.

On 5 October 1910 a revolution, instigated by Republican sympathizers, caused the royal family to flee to England and the residences of the monarchy were closed to the public.

In 1932, whilst in exile, King Manuel II of Portugal died from an abnormal swelling in the throat. His will ordered the creation of a foundation to safeguard the royal estate, which led to the creation of the Fundação da Casa de Bragança (House of Braganza Foundation). As part of this process, a systematic inventory and assessment was undertaken of the contents of the Palace by the DGEMN (Direcção Geral dos Edifícios e Monumentos Nacionais, "General-Directorate for Buildings and National Monuments") completed in 1938. Between 1945 and 1952 the DGMEN initiated public works to restore the Palace after years of neglect, supplemented by repairs to the roof in 1963.

It was not until 18 May 1984 that the palace was opened to the public, including one of the largest and most varied permanent expositions of carriages in Europe.

A re-tiling of the central wing was completed in 1985–1986, followed in 1989 by a similar project in the Ala dos Moços ("Children's Wing") in 1989.

The completed horizontal profile of the Ducal Palace of the Braganzas. On the right, the tower of the Royal Chapel

== Architecture ==
Located in the urban context of Vila Viçosa, the palace is situated on a stable plain at the foot of the castle hill. Rising 395 metres (1,296 ft) above this context, on a grand space, it fronts other historical buildings, including the Church of the Augustine Friars (Portuguese: Igreja dos Agostinhos), the Episcopal Palace (Portuguese: Paço do Bispo) and Convent of the Stigmata (Portuguese: Convento das Chagas).

The building consists of a grand rectangular profile, extending east to west, with three floors, and an irregular trapezoid structure to the north–south, with the roofing differently tiled above each of the spaces. The principal facade is fully lined with ashlar masonry and pink Estremoz marble, corresponding to the three respective floors and central pediment broken by two main doorways. The rest of the facades are broken by a series of rectangular windows, that harmoniously divide the surface in a rhythmic classic pattern, some with semi-circular pediments and framed cornices. Pilasters and architraves define the horizontal and vertical frames of many of the windows, giving the whole composition great sobriety and classicism.

The Lady's Garden occupies a comparable space by the residence, consisting of symmetrical patterns interspersed with sculptures of ancient shells and royal cavalry.

=== Interior ===
Access to the residence is made across the vestibule. From this space is the main marble staircase and marble walls, as well as a painted mural fresco representing the Tomada de Azamor (Taking of Azamor) in northern Africa in 1513 by Portuguese troops, commanded by James, Duke of Braganza. On the left-side is the disembarkation (Portuguese: Desembarque), to the centre the preparations of the encirclement (Portuguese: Preparativos do Cerco) and to the right the conquest of the fortress (Portuguese: Conquista da Praça).

In the first years of the 17th century, the palace received a decorative palette, considered "one of the richest group of fresco mural paintings encountered in Portuguese art". The rooms in the Palace extend along the horizontal plane, with a single corridor linking the spaces, including the Sala das Tapeçarias (Tapestry Hall), with sillar covered in 17th-century polychromatic blue-and-white azulejo tile, white marble fireplace, tile floor, and vaulted ceiling with phytomorphic painting. Several of the main rooms include spaces with painted fresco ceilings, and 17th-century blue-and-white/yellow azulejo tile, such as the Sala do Gigante (Hall of the Giant), with 16th-century fresco depicting the biblical episode between David and Goliath, which is framed by the arms of the Dukes of Braganza; the Oratório da Duquesa (Duchess' Oratory); andSala de Medusa (Hall of Medusa), with a painted fresco representing the battle between Medusa and Perseus. These group of paintings were"largely faithful to the aesthetic canons of the Italianate Mannerists". The compositions are replent in Moorish-influenced motifs executed between 1600 and 1640 by different painters: Tomás Luís, famous Lisbon painter, was attributed to the "two notable mural [ceiling] decorations" in the Hall of Medusa and the gallery of Duchess Catherine and José de Avelar Rebelo painted the ceilings of the Music Pavilion. The remainder of these rooms extend laterally through the accessway: the Sala de D. Duarte (Edwards' Hall), with a painted ceiling, with anthropomorphic elements and tiled floor; the Sala dos Duques (Hall of the Dukes) or Sala dos Tudescos is a noble salon and largest room in the building, decorated with frames of 17 Dukes of Braganza, from Joseph I: the Sala das Virtues (Hall of Virtues) has a ceiling of notable craftsmanship comprising framed paintings showing the seven theological virtues and morals, among them: Fé (Faith), Esperança (Hope), Caridade (Charity),Prudência (Prudence), Justiça (Justice), Forteleza (Strength), Temperança (Temperance) and Sapiência (Wisdom); and theSala de Jantar (Dining Hall) there is a similarly paneled ceiling with medallions, decorated in classical and mythological motifs. The rooms five doorways give access to the Jardim das Damas (Lady's Garden).

A chapel, referred to as the Sala dos Paramento/Órgãos (Hall of the Vestments/Organ) is covered in a vaulted ceiling with comparably painted roof frames.

The Pavilhão da Música (Music Pavilion) is an exceptional example: it consists of a painted wood ceiling, sillar with 17th-century azulejo tile depicting figures in panchromatic tiles in yellow, blue, green and red, representing the history of Tobit (Portuguese: Tobiãs) with the coat-of-arms of the Dukes of Braganza, and signed FIAB.

In addition, there are several other "named" rooms in palace, including the Sala D. Duarte (D. Duarte's Hall), Sala D. Fernando II (Ferdinand's Hall), Sala do Século 17 (17th-century Hall), Sala da Restauração (Restoration Hall), Sala de Hércules (Hall of Hercules), Sala Dourada ou da Duquesa (Golden Hall or Duchess Hall), named for Catherine wife of the 6th Duke, the Sala da Cabra Cega (Hall of the Blind Goat); Sala Indo-Portuguesa (Portuguese-India Hall); Sala das Loiças (Hall of Dishware); Sala dos Vidros (Hall of Glass); Sala dos Reis (Kings' Hall); the armory; and the famous wing of the New Quarters, named for the fact that it acted as the residence and studies for the King, with diverse antechambers, and corridors. Near the kitchen are the ovens, wine cellars, avery and storage spaces.

==== Azulejos ====
There are two panels (1558) made by Flemish Joan Boagerts in Antwerp. The rest of the historical azulejos (17th-century) that has the Ducal Palace are located in the Sala do Gigante and were made by the Spanish factory Talavera de la Reina pottery.
