= Duchess of Braganza =

The title of Duchess of Braganza has existed in Portugal since the 15th century. This title designates the female head of the House of Braganza.

== Duchess of Braganza ==
=== House of Braganza ===
Picture	Name	Father	Birth	Marriage	Became Duchess	Ceased to be Duchess	Death	Spouse
	Constance of Noronha	Alfonso, Count of Gijón and Noronha (Noronha)	1395	1420	1442 husband's accession	15 December 1461 husband's death	26 January 1480	Dom Afonso I
	Joana de Casro	João de Castro, 2nd Lord of Cadaval (Castro)	1410	28 December 1429	15 December 1461 husband's accession	1 April 1478 husband's death	28 December 1429	Dom Fernando I
	Isabella of Viseu	Infante Fernando, Duke of Viseu (Aviz)	1459	1472	1 April 1478 husband's accession	1483 husband's death	1521	Dom Fernando II
	Eleonor de Mendoza	Juan Alfonso Pérez de Guzmán, 3rd Duke of Medina Sidonia (Guzmán)	-	1502		1512		Dom Jaime I
	Joana de Mendonça	Diogo de Mendonça (Mendonça)	-	1520		20 September 1532 husband's death	1580	Dom Jaime I
	Isabel de Lencastre	Denis of Braganza, Count of Lemos (Braganza)	1513	25 June 1542		24 August 1558		Dom Teodósio I
	Beatriz de Lencastre	Luís de Lencastre, Grand Commander of Aviz (Aviz-Lancastre)	1542	4 September 1559		1563 husband's death	12 June 1623	Dom Teodósio I
	Infanta Catherine of Guimarães	Infante Edward, 4th Duke of Guimarães (Aviz)	18 January 1540	1563		1583 husband's death	15 November 1614	Dom João I
	Ana de Velasco y Téllez-Girón	Juan Fernández de Velasco, 5th Duke of Frías (Velasco)	1585	17 June 1603		7 November 1607		Dom Teodósio II
	Luisa de Guzmán	Juan Manuel Pérez de Guzmán, 8th Duke of Medina Sidonia (Guzmán)	13 October 1613	12 January 1633		1 December 1640 became Queen consort	27 February 1666	Dom João II
	Princess Maria Francisca of Nemours	Charles Amadeus, Duke of Nemours (Savoy)	21 June 1646	2 April 1668		12 September 1683 became Queen consort	27 December 1683	Dom Pedro I
	Infanta Mariana Victoria of Spain	Philip V of Spain (Bourbon)	31 March 1718	19 January 1729		31 July 1750 became Queen consort	15 January 1781	Dom José I
	Infanta Benedita of Portugal	Joseph I of Portugal (Braganza)	25 July 1746	21 February 1777	24 February 1777 became Princess	11 September 1788 husband's death	18 August 1829	Dom José II
	Infanta Carlota of Spain	Charles IV of Spain (Bourbon)	25 April 1775	8 May 1785	11 September 1788 brother-in-law's death	20 March 1816 became Queen	7 December 1830	Dom João IV
	Archduchess Maria Leopoldina of Austria	Francis II, Holy Roman Emperor (Habsburg-Lorraine)	22 January 1797	6 November 1817		26 March 1826 became Queen	11 December 1826	Dom Pedro II
	Amélie of Leuchtenberg	Eugène de Beauharnais (Beauharnais)	31 July 1812	2 August 1829	7 April 1831 husband's abdication	24 September 1834 husband's death	26 January 1873	Dom Pedro II
	Princess Amélie of Orléans	Prince Philippe, Count of Paris (Bourbon-Orléans)	28 September 1865	22 May 1886		19 October 1889 became Queen	25 October 1951	Dom Carlos I
Vacant position
Abolition of all noble titles (1910)

== See also ==
- Princess of Portugal
- Princess of Brazil
- Princess Royal of Portugal
- List of Portuguese consorts
- List of Brazilian consorts
