= Teodósio I, Duke of Braganza =

Portuguese nobleman (1479–1532)

Teodósio I
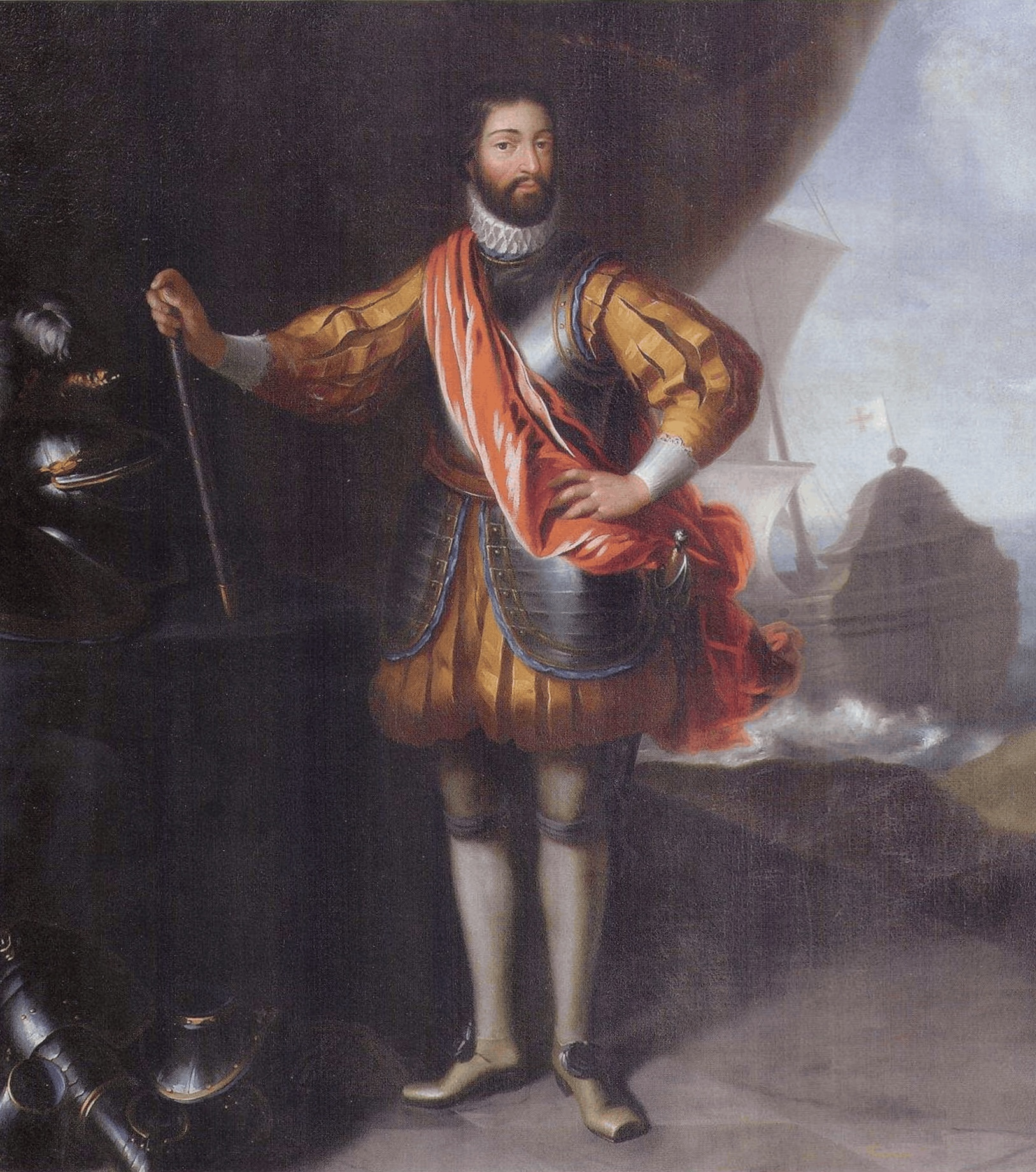
- D. Teodósio I; Ducal Palace of Vila Viçosa

Duke of Braganza
- Tenure: 20 September 1532 – 22 September 1563
- Predecessor: Jaime I
- Successor: João I
- Born: 1510; Vila Viçosa, Alentejo, Kingdom of Portugal
- Died: 22 September 1563 (aged 52–53); Vila Viçosa, Alentejo, Kingdom of Portugal
- Spouse: Isabel of Lencastre (m. 1513; died 1558) Beatriz of Lencastre (m. 1559)
- Issue among others...: João I, Duke of Braganza
- House: House of Braganza
- Father: Jaime I, Duke of Braganza
- Mother: Leonor Pérez de Guzmán

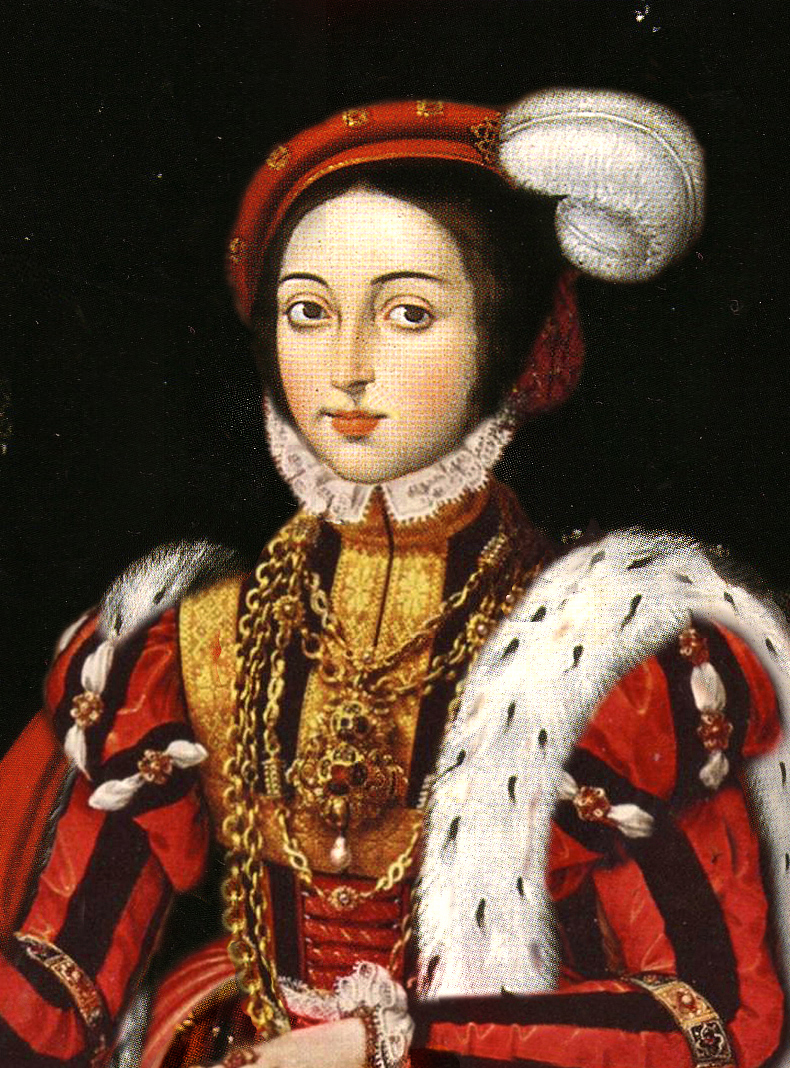
Duquesa D. Beatriz de Lencastre.

Dom Teodósio I of Braganza (Portuguese: Teodósio de Bragança; 1510 – 22 September 1563) was the 5th Duke of Braganza, among other titles. He is known for ceding the title of Duke of Guimarães to Infante Duarte of Aviz, alongside some of the wealth and properties of the House of Braganza.

== Biography ==
The Duke Teodósio I was an educated and refined man, a typical Renaissance prince. He loved painting and sculpture.

== Marriage and issue ==
In 1542, he married his 1st cousin Isabel of Lencastre (1513–1558), daughter of his uncle Dinis, and had John (João) I of Braganza, who succeeded him as 6th Duke of Braganza.

In 1559, he remarried with Beatriz of Lencastre (1542–1623), granddaughter of Infante George of Lencastre, Duke of Coimbra. Their first child, Jaime of Braganza, died without issue in 1578, in the Battle of Alcacer Quibir. Their second child, Isabel, married the 1st Duke of Caminha.

Name	Birth	Death	Notes
João I	1543	22 February 1583	13th Count of Barcelos, 10th Count of Ourém, 7th Count of Arraiolos and Neiva, 6th Duke of Braganza, 5th Marquis of Vila Viçosa
Jaime	unknown	4 August 1578	Died at the Battle of Alcacer Quibir; never married; no issue
Isabel	1560	unknown	Married Miguel Luis de Meneses, 1st Duke of Caminha

== Ancestry ==
Ancestors of Teodósio I, Duke of Braganza

8. Fernando I, Duke of Braganza
4. Fernando II, Duke of Braganza
9. Joana de Castro, 3rd Lady of Cadaval
2. Jaime, Duke of Braganza
10. Ferdinand, Duke of Viseu
5. Isabel of Viseu
11. Beatrice of Portugal
1. Teodósio I, Duke of Braganza
12. Enrique, 2nd Duke of Medina Sidonia
6. Juan Alonso, 3rd Duke of Medina Sidonia
13. Leonor de Ribera y Mendoza
3. Leonor de Guzmán y Velasco
14. Pedro, 2nd Count of Haro
7. Isabel de Velasco y Mendoza
15. Mencía de Mendoza y Figueroa

== Bibliography ==
- "Nobreza de Portugal e Brasil" Vol. II, page 445. Published by Zairol Lda., Lisbon, 1989.
- Genealogy of Duke Teodósio I of Braganza (in Portuguese)
- VILA-SANTA, Nuno, "O Duque como conselheiro: D. Teodósio e a Coroa em meados de Quinhentos"

Teodósio I, Duke of Braganza House of Braganza Cadet branch of the House of Aviz Born: 1430 Died: 1483
Portuguese nobility
Preceded by Jaime I	Duke of Braganza; Marquis of Vila Viçosa; Count of Barcelos, Ourém, Neiva, and Arraiolos; 1532–1563	Succeeded by João I
Preceded by Jaime I	Duke of Guimarães; 1532–1537	Succeeded by Duarte I
