= Prince of Brazil =

Title held by the heir-apparent to the Kingdom of Portugal, from 1645 to 1815

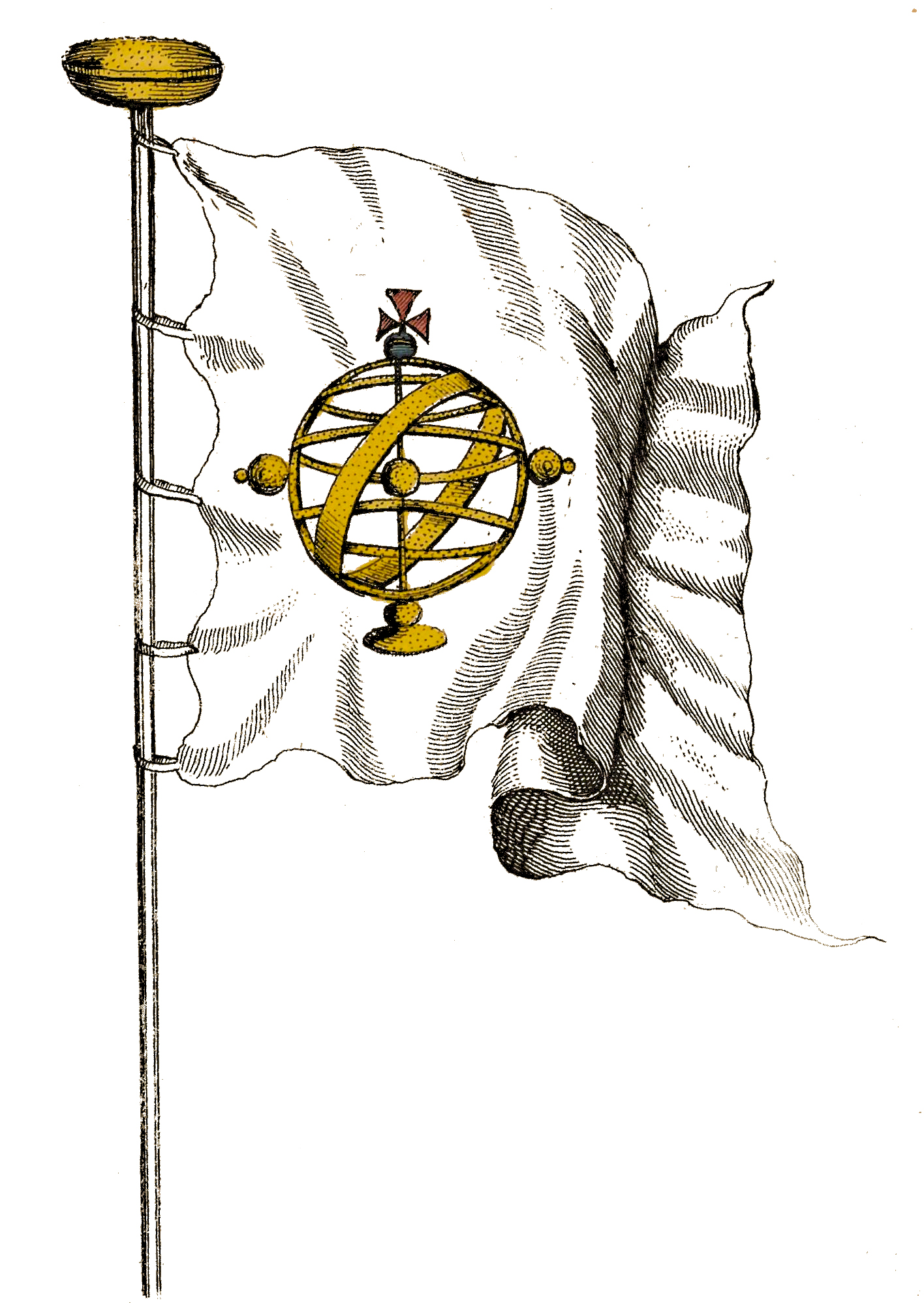
French illustration of the flag of the Princes of Brazil (1737)

Prince of Brazil (Portuguese: Príncipe do Brasil) was the title held by the heir-apparent to the Kingdom of Portugal, from 1645 to 1815. Tied with the title of Prince of Brazil was the title Duke of Braganza and the various subsidiary titles of the Dukedom of Braganza.

The title's name has its origins in the State of Brazil, a colony of the Portuguese Empire. The term "Principality of Brazil" is anachronistic, having never been used as the official title of Brazil in the period in question, in the same way that the "Principality of Beira" related to the nobiliarchic title Prince of Beira never existed. During this period, Brazil was officially designated as the State of Brazil.

The title was abandoned and changed to that of Prince Royal in the wake of Brazil's elevation from the status of a colony to the rank of a Kingdom united with Portugal in the United Kingdom of Portugal, Brazil and the Algarves.

Brazil would later break from the United Kingdom of Portugal, Brazil and the Algarves and become the independent Empire of Brazil. The heirs presumptive of Brazil were known as The Prince Imperial of Brazil or The Princess Imperial of Brazil, with the style of Imperial Highness. Other members of the Brazilian Imperial Family were known by the title of Prince or Princess prefixed to their given names, with the style of Highness. The Portuguese title of Prince of Brazil, that existed as a title of the Portuguese heir apparent only while Brazil was still a colony of Portugal, should therefore not be confused with the later ranks of Brazilian Prince or Brazilian Princess, that stem from the era of the Empire of Brazil.

== History ==
From the reign of King Duarte to the reign of King John IV of Portugal, the heir-apparent to the throne of Portugal had used the title of Prince of Portugal. After his succession to the throne, John IV sought to give his heir a more prestigious and noble title, Prince of Brazil, alongside granting the heir of Portugal the title of Duke of Braganza. The title was created by King John IV of Portugal in favor of his eldest son and heir Teodósio, to replace the title Prince of Portugal. The eldest son and heir of the Prince of Brazil was styled Prince of Beira and Duke of Barcelos.

In 1815, when Brazil was elevated to the status of a Kingdom within the United Kingdom of Portugal, Brazil and the Algarves, the title was replaced by Prince Royal of the United Kingdom of Portugal, Brazil, and the Algarves. When Brazil broke away from the United Kingdom to become an independent Empire, the title of the Portuguese heir apparent was again changed to Prince Royal of Portugal and the Algarves.

== List of princes of Brazil ==
Name	Lifespan	Tenure	Notes	Parents	Image	Heir to
Teodósio	8 February 1634 – May 13, 1653	27 October 1645 – May 13, 1653	Premature death	João IV of Portugal; Luisa de Guzmán		João IV of Portugal
Afonso	21 August 1643 – 12 September 1683	13 May 1653 – 6 November 1656	Later: King Afonso VI of Portugal and the Algarves	João IV of Portugal; Luisa de Guzmán		João IV of Portugal
João	30 August 1688 – 17 September 1688	30 August 1688 – 17 September 1688	Premature death	Pedro II of Portugal; Maria Sophia of Neuburg		Pedro II of Portugal
João	22 October 1689 – 31 July 1750	22 October 1689 – 9 December 1706	Later: King João V of Portugal and the Algarves	Pedro II of Portugal; Maria Sophia of Neuburg		Pedro II of Portugal
Pedro	19 October 1712 – 29 October 1714	19 October 1712 – 29 October 1714	Premature death	João V of Portugal; Maria Anna of Austria		João V of Portugal
José	6 June 1714 – 24 February 1777	6 June 1714 – 31 July 1750	Later: King José I of Portugal and the Algarves	João V of Portugal; Maria Anna of Austria		João V of Portugal
Maria	17 December 1734 – 20 March 1816	31 July 1750 – 24 February 1777	Later: Queen Maria I of Portugal and the Algarves	José I of Portugal; Mariana Victoria of Spain		José I of Portugal
José	20 August 1761 – 11 September 1788	24 February 1777 – 11 September 1788	Premature death	Maria I of Portugal; Pedro III of Portugal		Maria I of Portugal
João	13 May 1767 – 10 March 1826	11 September 1788 – 16 December 1815	Title changed	Maria I of Portugal; Pedro III of Portugal		Maria I of Portugal
