= Fernando I, Duke of Braganza =

Portuguese nobleman (1403–1478)

Fernando I
- Duke of Braganza
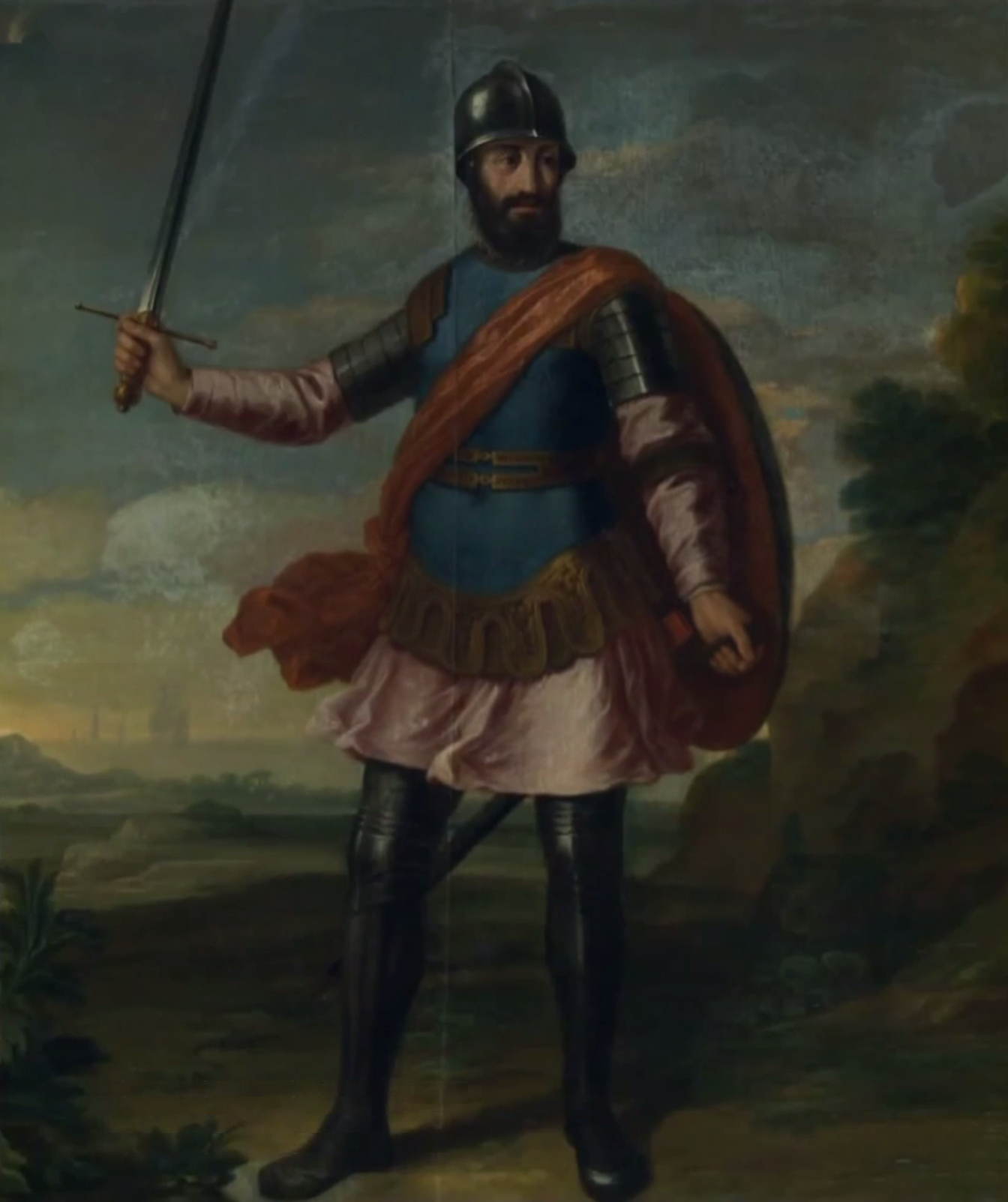
- D. Fernando I; Vila Viçosa Castle

Duke of Braganza
- Tenure: 15 December 1461 – 1 April 1478
- Predecessor: Afonso I
- Successor: Fernando II
- Born: 1403; Kingdom of Portugal
- Died: 1 April 1478 (aged 74–75); Vila Viçosa Castle, Vila Viçosa, Alentejo, Kingdom of Portugal
- Spouse: Joana de Castro (m. 1429)
- Issue: Fernando II, 3rd Duke of Braganza; João, 1st Marquis of Montemore-o-Novo; Afonso, 1st Count of Faro; Álvaro, 4th Lord of Cadaval; Beatriz of Braganza, Marchioness of Vila Real; Guiomar of Braganza, Countess of Viana do Alentejo
- House: Braganza
- Father: Afonso, Duke of Braganza
- Mother: Beatriz Pereira de Alvim

Dom Fernando I of Braganza (Portuguese pronunciation: [fɨɾˈnɐ̃du]; 1403 – 1 April 1478) was the 2nd Duke of Braganza and the 1st Marquis of Vila Viçosa, among other titles. He took part in the Portuguese conquests in North Africa and served as governor of different territories there.

== Early life and North African conquest ==
Born in 1403, Fernando I was the son of Afonso, 1st Duke of Braganza and Beatriz Pereira de Alvim. When still a child, he received the title of 3rd Count of Arraiolos from his grandfather Nuno Alvares Pereira.

In 1432, young Fernando I was called upon by King John I of Portugal for consultation on a project, promoted by the King's son, Prince Henry the Navigator, to launch a campaign of conquest against the Marinid sultanate of Morocco. Fernando advised against the project. When the project was raised again during the reign of King Edward of Portugal in 1436, Fernando reiterated his objections. Nonetheless, despite his opposition, King Edward appointed him as constable of the nobles for the 1437 expedition to seize Tangier. Although the expedition was under the overall command of his brother Prince Henry, King Edward felt that Fernando's military expertise was necessary to make up for his brother's inexperience.

After failing to conquer the city by assault, the Portuguese expeditionary army was surrounded and starved into submission by a Moroccan relief army. In return for being allowed to withdraw his troops unmolested, Henry agreed to a treaty to deliver Ceuta back to the Marinids. For the fulfillment of the treaty, Prince Henry handed over his own brother, Ferdinand the Saint Prince, as a hostage to the Moroccans.

== Return to Portugal ==
Back in Portugal, Fernando I led the opposition to this treaty. At the Cortes of Leiria assembled by King Edward early in 1438, he rallied the nobles and took to the floor, urging them to refuse the surrender of Ceuta back to the Marinids. He claimed that the treaty was signed under duress and invalid. It was largely because of Fernando's energetic campaign that the Cortes rejected ratification and made known to the King to find some other way of securing his brother Prince Ferdinand's release (none was found – Ferdinand the Saint Prince would die in Moroccan captivity in 1443).

Fernando I was nominated Governor of Ceuta from 1445 until 1450.

By royal decree dated from 25 May 1455, King Afonso V of Portugal granted Fernando I the new title of 1st Marquis of Vila Viçosa.

In 1458, Fernando I took part, along with his sons, in the expedition that conquered the Moroccan city of Alcácer Ceguer.

In 1460, as his older brother, Afonso, Marquis of Valença, died without legitimate issue, Fernando I became the 5th Count of Ourém and the House of Braganza's heir. One year later, following the death of his father in 1461, he also became the 2nd Duke of Braganza, 9th Count of Barcelos, 3rd Count of Neiva, and 3rd Count of Faria. He then established his seat at the primitive Castle of Vila Viçosa.

In 1471, when King Afonso V took to North Africa to conquer the city of Arzila, Fernando I remained in mainland Portugal as regent of the kingdom.

== Marriage and issue ==
Fernando I married on 28 December 1429, Joana de Castro, Lady of Cadaval (1410 – 14 February 1479). They had nine children, of whom three were stillborn.

| Name | Birth | Death | Notes |
|---|---|---|---|
| Fernando II of Braganza | 1430 | 20 June 1483 | 3rd Duke of Braganza, 2nd Marquis of Vila Viçosa, 1st Duke of Guimarães |
| João of Braganza | 1432 | 30 April 1484 | 1st Marquis of Montemor-o-Novo |
| Afonso of Braganza | 1435 | unknown | 1st Count of Faro |
| Álvaro of Braganza | 1440 | 1504 | 5th Lord of Ferreira, 4th Lord of Cadaval, 1st Senhor de Tentúgal |
| António | unknown | unknown | stillborn |
| Isabel | unknown | unknown | stillborn |
| Beatriz of Braganza | 1434 | unknown | Married Pedro de Meneses, 1st Marquis of Vila Real |
| Catarina | unknown | unknown | stillborn |
| Guiomar of Braganza | 1444 | unknown | Married Henrique de Meneses, 4th Count of Viana do Alentejo |

== Ancestry ==
Ancestors of Fernando I, Duke of Braganza

8. Peter I of Portugal
4. John I of Portugal
9. Teresa Lourenço
2. Afonso, Duke of Braganza
10. Pero Esteves, o Barbadão
5. Inês Pires
11. Maria Anes
1. Fernando I, Duke of Braganza
12. Álvaro Gonçalves Pereira
6. Nuno Álvares Pereira
13. Iria Gonçalves do Carvalhal
3. Beatriz Pereira de Alvim
14. João Pires de Alvim
7. Leonor de Alvim
15. Branca Pires Coelho

== See also ==
- Marquis of Vila Viçosa
- Count of Neiva

== Bibliography ==
- ”Nobreza de Portugal e do Brasil” – Vol. II, page 439. Published by Zairol Lda., Lisbon 1989.
- Genealogical information on Fernando I of Braganza (in Portuguese)

Fernando I, Duke of Braganza House of Braganza Cadet branch of the House of Aviz Born: 1479 Died: 1532
Portuguese nobility
| Preceded by Afonso I | Duke of Braganza; Count of Barcelos; 1461–1478 | Succeeded by Fernando II |
| Preceded by Nuno Álvares Pereira | Count of Arraiolos; 1422–1478 | Succeeded by Fernando II |
| New title | Marquis of Vila Viçosa; 1455–1478 | Succeeded by Fernando II |
| New title | Count of Neiva; 1461–1478 | Succeeded by Fernando II |
| Preceded by Afonso, Marquis of Valença | Count of Ourém; 1460–1478 | Succeeded by Fernando II |
