= Marquis of Vila Viçosa =

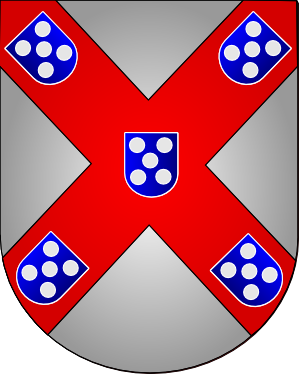
The Coat of Arms of the Braganzas, Marquesses of Vila Viçosa

The title Marquis of Vila Viçosa (in Portuguese Marquês de Vila Viçosa) was created by royal decree, dated May 25, 1455, by King Afonso V of Portugal), to Fernando of Braganza, second son of Afonso, 1st Duke of Braganza.

Dom Fernando, was already 3rd Count of Arraiolos when he got the new title of Marquis of Vila Viçosa. Later, in 1460, as his older brother Afonso, died without legitimate issue, he became the House of Braganza heir and, one year later, following his father’s death (1461), he also became the 2nd Duke of Braganza.

That’s why the title Marquis of Vila Viçosa became associated with the title Duke of Braganza.

The Queen consort Amélie of Orleans, while in exile (20th Century), also used the title of Marchioness of Vila Viçosa.

== List of marquesses of Vila Viçosa ==
1. Ferdinand I of Braganza (1403–1478), 2nd Duke of Braganza;
2. Ferdinand II of Braganza (1430–1483), 3rd Duke of Braganza;
3. James of Braganza (1479–1532), 4th Duke of Braganza;
4. Teodósio I of Braganza (1520–1563), 5th Duke of Braganza;
5. John I of Braganza (1543–1583), 6th Duke of Braganza;
6. Teodósio II of Braganza (1568–630), 7th Duke of Braganza;
7. John II of Braganza (1604–1656), 8th Duke of Braganza, crowned King as John IV of Portugal, on December 1, 1640

After the accession of the House of Braganza to the Portuguese throne in 1640, this title became linked to the Crown.

== See also ==
- Duke of Braganza
- House of Braganza
- Dukedoms in Portugal
- List of marquisates in Portugal
- List of countships in Portugal

== Bibliography ==
”Nobreza de Portugal e do Brasil” – Vol. III, page 534. Published by Zairol Lda., Lisbon 1989.
