= Prince Royal of Portugal =

Title of the heir to the Portuguese throne from 1825 to 1910

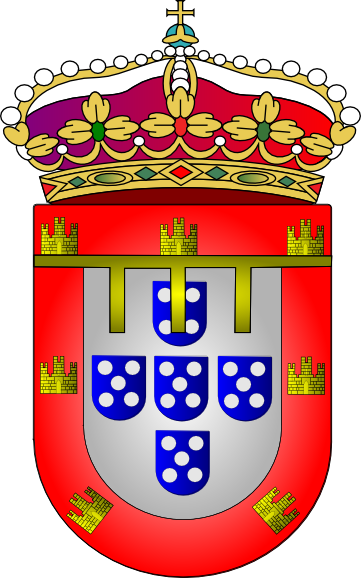
Coat of arms of the Prince Royal.

Prince Royal (Portuguese: Príncipe Real) was the title held by the heir apparent or the heir presumptive to the throne of the Kingdom of Portugal, from 1825 to 1910.

The eldest son of the Prince Royal held the title of Prince of Beira.

== History ==
The title of Prince Royal (Príncipe Real) was created in 1815, when the prince regent D. João (future King João VI of Portugal) elevated the State of Brazil to the rank of a kingdom within the United Kingdom of Portugal, Brazil and the Algarves. At this moment the old title of Prince of Brazil was extinct.

With the deposition of the Portuguese monarchy, in 1910, and King Manuel II's death in 1932, the title became abeyant.

== List of Princes Royal ==
Name	Lifespan	Tenure	Notes	Parents	Image	Heir To
João	13 May 1767 – 10 March 1826	16 December 1815 – 20 March 1816	Later: King João VI of Portugal and the Algarves	Maria I of Portugal; Pedro III of Portugal		Maria I of Portugal
Pedro	12 October 1798 – 24 September 1834	20 March 1816 – 10 March 1826	Later: King Pedro IV of Portugal and the Algarves	João VI of Portugal; Carlota Joaquina of Spain		João VI of Portugal
Pedro	16 September 1837 – 11 November 1861	16 September 1837 – 15 November 1853	Later: King Pedro V of Portugal and the Algarves	Maria II of Portugal; Fernando II of Portugal		Maria II of Portugal
Carlos	28 September 1863 – 1 February 1908	28 September 1863 – 19 October 1889	Later: King Carlos I of Portugal and the Algarves	Luís I of Portugal; Maria Pia of Savoy		Luís I of Portugal
Luís Filipe	21 March 1887 – 1 February 1908	19 October 1889 – 1 February 1908	Premature death	Carlos I of Portugal; Amélie of Orléans		Carlos I of Portugal
Afonso	31 July 1865 – 21 February 1920	1 February 1908 – 5 October 1910	Monarchy abolished	Luís I of Portugal; Maria Pia of Savoy		Manuel II of Portugal

== See also ==
- Prince of Portugal
- Prince of Brazil
- Prince of Beira
- Infante
- List of Portuguese monarchs
