= Duke of Barcelos =

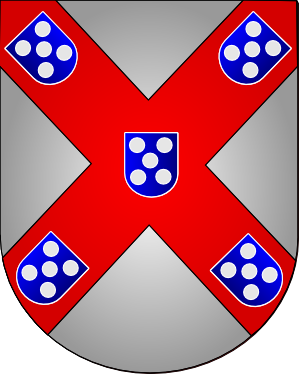
Original Coat of Arms of the Dukes of Braganza.

The Dukes of Barcelos (Portuguese: Duque de Barcelos) was a title of nobility granted by King Sebastian of Portugal on 5 August 1562 to the heir of the Duke of Braganza. After the Braganza accession to the throne, the title continued to be the title of the heir of the Duke of Braganza, alongside the title of Prince of Beira.

This title (originally Count of Barcelos) belonged to the Braganzas since Alphonse, 8th Count of Barcelos and 1st Duke of Braganza.

The first Duke of Barcelos was John I, eldest son of Teodósio I, 5th Duque of Braganza, who become later John I, 6th Duke of Braganza.

== List of dukes of Barcelos ==
1. John I, 6th Duke of Braganza (1543–1583), 1st Duke of Barcelos from his birth until his father's death (1563);
2. Teodósio II, 7th Duke of Braganza (1568–1630), 2nd Duke of Barcelos (until 1583);
3. John II, 8th Duke of Braganza (1604–1656), 3rd Duke of Barcelos (until 1630). Became King of Portugal in 1640.

After the Braganzas ascended to the Portuguese throne, the title of Duke of Barcelos was among those used by the Portuguese Prince of Beira.

== See also ==
- Duke of Braganza
- Count of Barcelos
- Dukedoms in Portugal
