= Kingdom of Portugal =

Kingdom in Southwestern Europe (1139–1910)

Coordinates: 38°42′N 9°11′W

Kingdom of Portugal (Note: also known as the Kingdom of Portugal and the Algarves (Latin: Regnum Portugalliae et Algarbiae, Portuguese: Reino de Portugal e dos Algarves) after 1415, and as the United Kingdom of Portugal, Brazil and the Algarves (Portuguese: Reino Unido de Portugal, Brasil e Algarves) between 1815 and 1822.) Reino de Portugal (Portuguese)
- 1143–1910
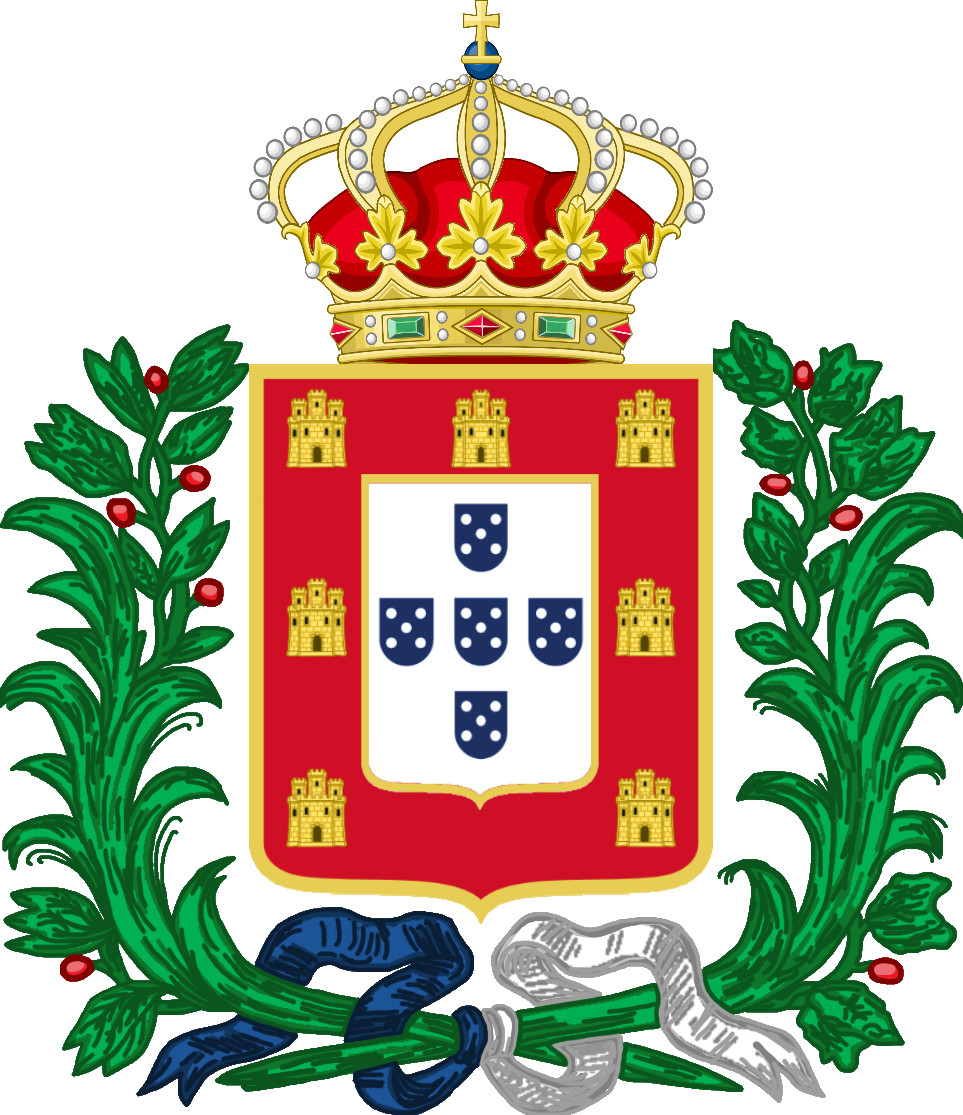
- Flag (1830–1910) Coat of arms (1834–1910)
- Motto: "In hoc signo vinces" (Latin) "In this sign thou shalt conquer"
- Anthem: "Hymno Patriótico" (1809–1834) "Patriotic Anthem" Hino da Carta (1834–1910) "Anthem of the Charter"
- The Kingdom of Portugal in 1800
- Capital: Coimbra (until 1255); Lisbon (1255–1910) (Note: From 1808 to 1821 Rio de Janeiro was the seat of the Portuguese court and the de facto seat of government. Additionally, Antony I and Mary II ruled from Angra do Heroísmo between 1580 to 1582 and 1830 to 1834 respectively whilst their holds over the mainland were in dispute.)
- Official languages: Portuguese (Note: Galician-Portuguese (until 16th century) Modern Portuguese (16th century onward)) Latin (Note: Widely used for administrative and liturgical purposes. Medieval Latin replaced by Renaissance Latin by the 15th century.)
- Religion: Roman Catholicism (official)
- Demonym: Portuguese
- Government: Feudal monarchy (until 1698); Absolute monarchy (1698–1822; 1823–1826; 1828–1834); Semi-constitutional monarchy (1822–1823; 1826–1828; 1834–1910)
- King
  - 1139–1185: Afonso I (first)
  - 1385–1433: John I (longest)
  - 1908–1910: Manuel II (last)
- Prime Minister
  - 1834–1835: Marquis of Palmela (first)
  - 1910: Teixeira de Sousa (last)
- Legislature: Cortes (until 1706; 1816–1822); None (rule by decree) (1698–1822; 1823–1826; 1828–1834); The General and Extraordinary Cortes of the Portuguese Nation (1822–1822); Cortes Gerais (1822–1823; 1826–1828; 1834–1910)
  - Upper house: Chamber of Peers (1822–1838; 1842–1910); Chamber of Senators (1838–1842)
  - Lower house: Chamber of Deputies (1822–1910)
- History
  - Battle of Ourique: 25 July 1139
  - Treaty of Zamora: 5 October 1143
  - Avis dynasty: 15 October 1385
  - Philippine dynasty: 25 March 1581
  - Restoration of Independence: 1 December 1640
  - Lisbon Regicide: 1 February 1908
  - Revolution of 1910: 5 October 1910

Area
- 1300: 90,000 km^{2} (35,000 sq mi)

Population
  - 1300: 800,000
  - 1800: 9,270,000
  - 1900: 12,434,000
- Currency: Portuguese dinheiro, (until 1433); Portuguese real (1433–1910)
Preceded by	Succeeded by
County of Portugal; Couto Misto	First Portuguese Republic; Empire of Brazil

The Kingdom of Portugal was a monarchy in the western Iberian Peninsula and the predecessor of the modern Portuguese Republic. Existing to various extents between the mid-12th century and the early 20th century, it was also known as the Kingdom of Portugal and the Algarves after 1471, and was the main constituent of the United Kingdom of Portugal, Brazil and the Algarves, which existed between 1815 and 1822. It coexisted with the Portuguese Empire, the realm's overseas colonies.

The nucleus of the Portuguese state was the County of Portugal, established in the 9th century as part of the Reconquista by Vímara Peres, a vassal of the King of Asturias. The county became part of the Kingdom of León in 1097, and the Counts of Portugal established themselves as rulers of an independent kingdom in the 12th century, following the Battle of São Mamede. The kingdom was ruled by the Afonsine dynasty until the 1383–1385 Portuguese interregnum, after which the monarchy passed to the House of Aviz.

During the 15th and 16th century, Portuguese exploration established a vast colonial empire. From 1580 to 1640, the Kingdom of Portugal was in personal union with Habsburg Spain.

After the Portuguese Restoration War of 1640–1668, the kingdom passed to the House of Braganza and thereafter to the House of Braganza-Saxe-Coburg and Gotha. From this time, the influence of Portugal declined, but it remained a major power due to its most valuable colony, Brazil. After the independence of Brazil, Portugal sought to establish itself in Africa, but was ultimately forced to halt its expansion due to the 1890 British Ultimatum, eventually leading to the collapse of the monarchy in the 5 October 1910 revolution and the establishment of the First Portuguese Republic.

Portugal was an absolute monarchy before 1822. It alternated between absolute and semi-constitutional monarchy from 1822 until 1834, when it would remain a semi-constitutional monarchy until its fall.

== History ==
=== Origins ===
The Kingdom of Portugal finds its origins in the County of Portugal. The Portuguese County was a semi-autonomous county of the Kingdom of León. Independence from León took place in three stages:

1. The first on 26 July 1139 when Afonso Henriques was acclaimed King of the Portuguese by his troops after the (possibly legendary) Battle of Ourique.
2. The second was on 5 October 1143, when Alfonso VII of León and Castile recognized Afonso Henriques as king through the Treaty of Zamora. This is generally considered the traditional founding of the kingdom in Portuguese historiography and popular imagination.
3. The third, in 1179, was the Papal Bull Manifestis Probatum, in which Portugal's independence was recognized by Pope Alexander III.

Once Portugal was independent, D. Afonso I's descendants, members of the Portuguese House of Burgundy, would rule Portugal until 1383. Even after the change in royal houses, all the monarchs of Portugal were descended from Afonso I, one way or another, through both legitimate and illegitimate links.

=== Fall of the Monarchy ===
With the start of the 20th century, Republicanism grew in numbers and support in Lisbon among progressive politicians and the influential press. However a minority with regard to the rest of the country, this height of republicanism would benefit politically from the Lisbon Regicide on 1 February 1908. While returning from the Ducal Palace at Vila Viçosa, King Charles and the Prince Royal Luís Filipe were assassinated in the Terreiro do Paço, in Lisbon. With the death of the King and his heir, Charles I's second son became monarch as King Manuel II. Manuel's reign was short-lived however, ending by force with the 5 October 1910 revolution, forcing the deposed king into immediate exile in the United Kingdom and giving way to the Portuguese First Republic.

On 19 January 1919, the Monarchy of the North was proclaimed in Porto, but its inability to gain strong popular support anywhere in the rest the country, coupled with its unorganised structure, led to its swift demise and the re-establishment of republican control in the north a month later. No other monarchist counter-revolution in Portugal has occurred since.

After the republican revolution in October 1910, the remaining colonies of the empire became overseas provinces of the Portuguese Republic until the late 20th century when the last overseas territories of Portugal became independent, most notably in Portuguese Africa where the provinces of Angola and Mozambique achieved independence in 1975. The Portuguese Empire ended definitively with the handover of Macau to China in 1999.

== Gallery ==
=== Flags ===
Flag of the Kingdom of Portugal (1495–1521)

Flag of the Kingdom of Portugal (1521–1578)

Flag of the Kingdom of Portugal (1521–1640)

Secondary flag of the Kingdom of Portugal (1616–1640)

Flag of the Kingdom of Portugal (1640–1667)

=== Coat of arms ===
Coat of arms of the Kingdom of Portugal (1610–1815)

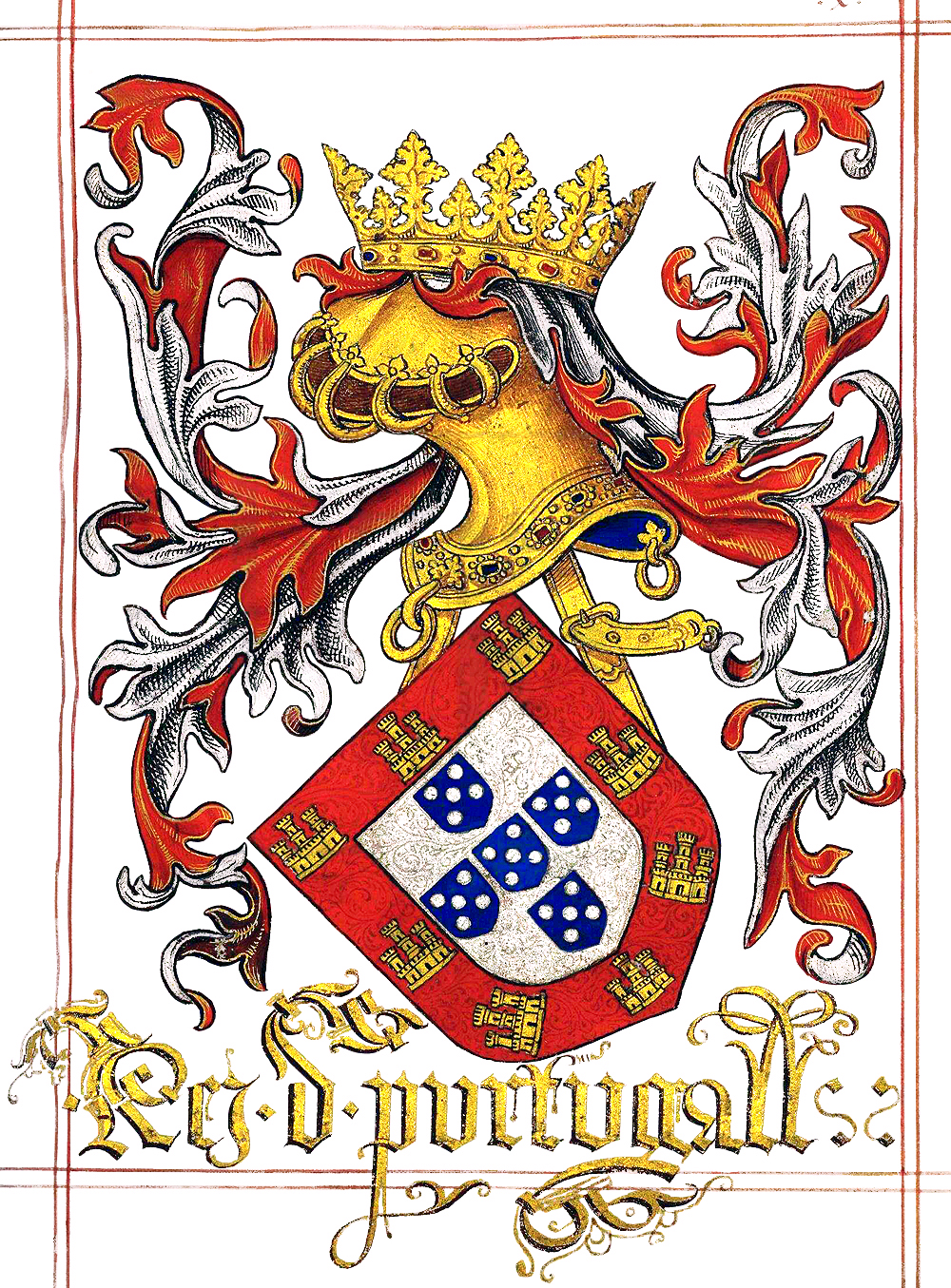
Arms of the King of Portugal depicted in the Livro do Armeiro-Mor (c. 1509)

=== Shields ===
Shield of the Kingdom of Portugal (1185–1248)

Shield of the Kingdom of Portugal (1248–1385)

Shield of the Kingdom of Portugal (1385–1481)

Shield of the Kingdom of Portugal (1481–1495)

== See also ==
- Kingdom of Algarve
- United Kingdom of Portugal, Brazil and the Algarves
- List of titles and honours of the Portuguese Crown
- Portuguese nobility
- Portuguese heraldry
