= Count of Neiva =

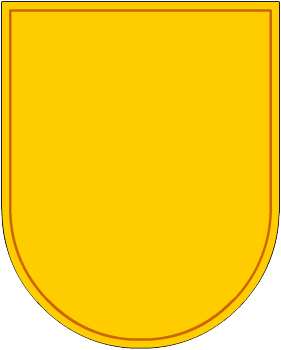
The Coat of Arms of the Meneses family, the first to bear the title of Count of Neiva.

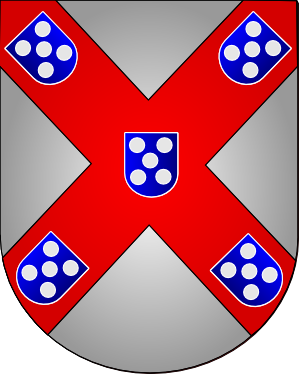
The Coat of Arms of the Dukes of Braganza, who inherited the County of Neiva.

Count of Neiva (in Portuguese Conde de Neiva) is a Portuguese title granted, in 1373 by King Ferdinand I of Portugal, to Dom Gonçalo Teles de Meneses, brother of Queen Leonor Telles de Meneses.

Dom Gonçalo was also Lord of Faria, and that is why some authors, incorrectly, call him Count of Neiva and Faria.

Later, the County was granted to Fernando of Braganza and when Fernando became 2nd Duke of Braganza (1461), Count of Neiva became a subsidiary title of the House of Braganza.

== List of counts of Ourém ==
1. Gonçalo Teles de Meneses ( ? -1403);
2. Fernando I, Duke of Braganza (1403-1478).

(for the list of holders after this date, see Duke of Braganza)

== See also ==
- Count of Barcelos
- Duke of Braganza
- House of Braganza
- Dukedoms in Portugal
- List of countships in Portugal

== Bibliography ==
”Nobreza de Portugal e do Brasil” – Vol. III, page 47. Published by Zairol Lda., Lisbon 1989.
