= Count of Ourém =

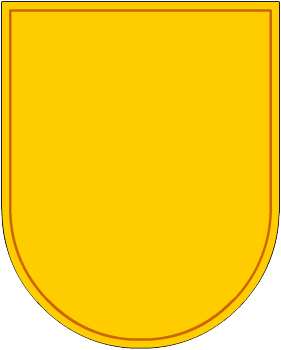
The Coat of Arms of the Meneses family, the first to bear the title of Count of Ourém.

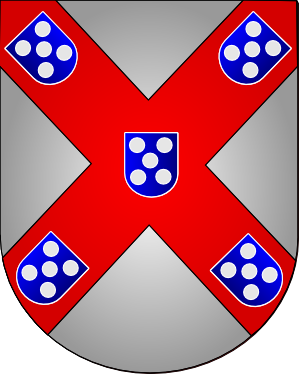
The Coat of Arms of the Dukes of Braganza, who inherited the County of Ourém.

Count of Ourém (in Portuguese Conde de Ourém) is a Portuguese title granted in 1370 by King Fernando I of Portugal, to Dom João Afonso Telo, uncle of Queen Leonor Teles. Later he also became the fourth Count of Barcelos.

The title subsequently passed to João Fernandes Andeiro (a Galician noble and lover of Queen Leonor), who was killed by the future John I of Portugal (at that time the Grand Master of the Military Order of Aviz). When John seized the throne, he bestowed the title on his Constable, Nuno Álvares Pereira.

When the Constable's daughter married the first Duke of Braganza, Count of Ourém became a subsidiary title of the House of Braganza.

In 1483, Fernando II, third Duke of Bragança, was condemned for treason by order of king John II of Portugal. The House of Braganza estates were confiscated and the Condado of Ourém was granted to Pedro de Menezes, 1st Count of Vila Real, grandson of João Afonso Telo, 1st Count of Ourém.

When king Manuel I inherited the Portuguese throne, he restored the Braganzas with all their previous honours, and from then on the County of Ourém was included in the Braganzas' assets.

== List of counts of Ourém ==
1. João Afonso Telo (1310-1381), also 4th Count of Barcelos;
2. João Fernandes Andeiro (1320-1383);
3. Nuno Álvares Pereira (1360-1431), also 7th Count of Barcelos, 2nd Count of Arraiolos and 2nd Constable of Portugal;
4. Afonso of Braganza (1400-1460), also 1st Marquis of Valença;
5. Fernando I, Duke of Braganza (1403-1478);
6. Fernando II, Duke of Braganza (1430-1483);
7. Pedro de Menezes, 1st Count of Vila Real (1425-1499);
8. Jaime, Duke of Braganza (1479-1532).

(for the list of holders after this date, see Duke of Braganza)

== See also ==
- Count of Barcelos
- Duke of Braganza
- House of Braganza
- Dukedoms in Portugal
- List of countships in Portugal

== Bibliography ==
”Nobreza de Portugal e do Brasil” – Vol. III, pages 82–84. Published by Zairol Lda., Lisbon 1989.OCLC 433804701
