= Count of Arraiolos =

The Coat of Arms of Nuno Álvares Pereira, who bore the title of Count of Arraiolos.

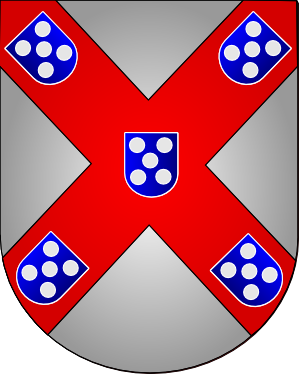
The Coat of Arms of the Dukes of Braganza, who inherited the County of Arraiolos.

Count of Arraiolos (in Portuguese Conde de Arraiolos) is a Portuguese title granted, in 1377 by King Fernando I of Portugal, to Dom Álvaro Pires de Castro, a Galician noble, brother of Inês de Castro (King Pedro I of Portugal 2nd wife). Álvaro Pires de Castro was already Count of Viana (da Foz do Lima) when he received this new title.

Following Álvaro's death, King John I of Portugal gave this County to his Constable, Nuno Álvares Pereira in 1387, who ceded it, in 1422, to his grandson, Fernando of Braganza.

The title of Count of Arraiolos became a subsidiary title of the House of Braganza when Fernando became 2nd Duke of Braganza (1461).

== List of counts of Arraiolos ==
1. Álvaro Pires de Castro (1310-1384), also 1st Count of Viana (da Foz do Lima) and 1st Constable of Portugal;
2. Nuno Álvares Pereira (1360-1431), also 7th Count of Barcelos, 2nd Count of Ourém and 2nd Constable of Portugal;
3. Fernando I, Duke of Braganza (1403-1478).

(for the list of holders after this date, see Duke of Braganza)

== See also ==
- Count of Barcelos
- Duke of Braganza
- House of Braganza
- Dukedoms in Portugal
- List of countships in Portugal

== Bibliography ==
- "Nobreza de Portugal e do Brasil" – Vol. II, page 321. Published by Zairol Lda., Lisbon 1989.
