= Count of Barcelos =

Noble title in the Kingdom of Portugal

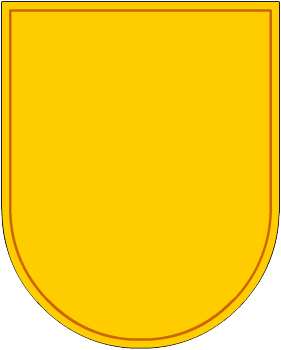
The Coat of Arms of the Meneses family, the first to bear the title of Count of Barcelos.

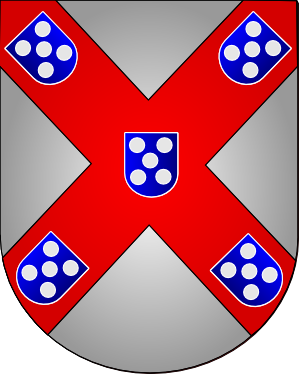
The Coat of Arms of Afonso, 8th Count of Barcelos in 1401, when he inherited it from his father-in-law, Nuno Álvares Pereira.

Count of Barcelos (in Portuguese Conde de Barcelos) is a title of nobility, the first to be granted in Portugal. It was created in 1298 by king Denis I and initially it was a non hereditary title, although most of the holders belonged to the Teles de Menezes family. It was only after the death of the 6th Count, when it was granted to Nuno Álvares Pereira, that the title became hereditary. The 8th Count of Barcelos was created Duke of Braganza in 1442, by his nephew king Afonso V, and his descendants rose to the Portuguese throne after the country regained its independence from Spain in 1640.

Initially, the seat of the Counts of Barcelos was the Palace of the Dukes of Barcelos, a large medieval structure that overlooks the Cávado river. After having been granted the Dukedom of Braganza, the family moved to a larger and more urbane palace in Guimarães, the Palace of the Dukes of Braganza.

The title is currently held by Duarte Pio, Duke of Braganza and 31st Count of Barcelos, claimant to the throne of Portugal.

== List of counts of Barcelos ==
=== Non-hereditary title (1298) ===
- 1. João Afonso Telo;
- 2. Martim Gil de Riba de Vizela, also known as Martim Gil de Sousa (1st Count's son in law);
- 3. Pedro Afonso, natural son of King Denis I of Portugal;
- 4. João Afonso Telo, also 1st Count of Ourém;
- 5. Afonso Teles de Meneses, 4th count's son. Since he died before his father, the title reverted to his father;
- 6. João Afonso Telo, 4th count's nephew, son of Martim Afonso Telo de Meneses, and also brother of Queen Leonor Teles.

=== Hereditary title (1385) ===
- 7. Nuno Álvares Pereira
- 8. Afonso, also Duke of Braganza (1442), son in law of the 7th Count.

For the list of holders after this date, see Dukes of Braganza.

== See also ==
- Duke of Barcelos

== Bibliography ==
- "Nobreza de Portugal e do Brasil" – Vol. II, pages 376-401. Published by Zairol Lda., Lisbon 1989.
