= Juan Zumel =

16th-century Castilian magistrate

Personal details
- Born: c. 1473 Crown of Castile, possibly Valladolid or Burgos
- Died: 16 April 1534 Burgos, Crown of Castile
- Citizenship: Spanish
- Spouse: Catalina de Estrada
- Children: At least none acknowledged
- Education: University of Valladolid
- Occupation: Politician
- Known for: His participation in the Cortes of Valladolid of 1518
- Treatment: Doctor

Juan Zumel (possibly Valladolid, c. 1473 – Burgos, 16 April 1534) was a Castilian magistrate of the 16th century who held political offices in the city of Burgos, as alcalde mayor (chief magistrate) and chief notary, and in Valladolid, as a councilman and protector of the Hospital de Esgueva. He married Catalina de Estrada, joined the confraternity of Santiago, and was chosen as guardian of Juliana Angela de Velasco y Aragón, daughter of the Constable of Castile Bernardino Fernández de Velasco y Mendoza.

He is known for his active participation in the Cortes de Valladolid de 1518, in which he voiced his opposition to the granting of offices to foreigners by the new monarch, Charles I. During the Revolt of the Comuneros, in 1520 and 1521, he secured Burgos's submission to royal authority, pacified Valencia, and went to Toledo as an investigating judge to sentence the rebels of that city, who had just surrendered in October–November 1521. This conduct earned him numerous royal favors, though it also brought reprisals from the comuneros.

After these events, he was appointed guardian of Atanasio de Ayala, son of the rebel count of Salvatierra. In the last years of his life he also carried out several commissions for the Constable of Castile, with whom he had a lasting friendship. He died in Burgos on 16 April 1534, and in his will asked to be buried in Valladolid.

== Life and offices ==
=== Early years ===
Although no parish records survive that establish a definite date, Juan Zumel was likely born, according to historian Domingo Hergueta y Martín, around the year 1473, although it is unclear whether in Burgos – as is generally believed – or in Valladolid, where, in addition to earning his doctorate at the University of Valladolid, he married Catalina de Estrada and served as a councilman and great protector of the Hospital de Esgueva. There, too, he held nearly all of his property: three houses on the "Hacera" street – brought by his wife – and another main house adjoining these, located at the "entrance to the Plazuela Vieja," which he bought after his marriage. In Burgos, by contrast, he left at his death nothing more than ninety books.

Among his marital assets, Zumel brought into the marriage an estate that yielded fifty-six fanegas of grain, half wheat and half barley, in Barcones (Province of Soria), while Catalina brought houses and estates in Madrigal (Province of Guadalajara). Both properties lay within the lordship of María de Tovar, wife of the man who later became Constable of Castile, Íñigo Fernández de Velasco, with whom the couple maintained a close relationship. Thus, when the Velascos inherited the duchy of Frías and moved to Burgos, Zumel accompanied them, and Velasco himself even proposed him for the Royal Council.

There is conflicting information as to whether the marriage produced children. In a letter addressed to the Junta of Valladolid during the Revolt of the Comuneros, at the beginning of February 1521, Zumel asks that "leave be granted to Doña Catalina, his lady, and to a son of his," but his will makes no mention of any direct descendant.

=== Confrere of Santiago and guardian of Juliana Ángela de Velasco ===
As a member of a distinguished family, Zumel was able to join the Confraternity of the Knights of San Pedro and Santiago de la Fuente, established to bring together the knights and nobles of Burgos. During the second decade of the 16th century he also took charge, together with Juan de Velasco and Martín Ochoa de Saviola, of the guardianship of Juliana Ángela de Velasco y Aragón, whose father Bernardino Fernández de Velasco y Mendoza had left her a majorat on condition that she marry a descendant of her great-grandfather Juan de Velasco.

Juan Zumel traveled with Ochoa de Saviola to the town of San Vicente de la Sonsierra, in the Province of Logroño, and there, on 16 June 1516, he and Ochoa de Saviola executed a deed whereby Juan Téllez Girón, count of Ureña, and his son Pedro Girón y Velasco, sold to Juliana the aforementioned town of San Vicente, with all seigneurial rights and full judicial authority, for the sum of 21,250,000 maravedís, for which she pledged the possession of the town and fortress of Briones. It was Zumel who, after the customary formalities, handed the staff of justice to the new seigneurial alcalde, Pero Gil.

=== Alcalde mayor of Burgos ===
Following the resignation of Juan Osorio, on 13 June 1515 Zumel was appointed by the crown, for life, alcalde mayor of Burgos, on account of his "sufficiency," "ability," and certain services rendered to the Crown.

==== Dispute with the abbess of Las Huelgas ====
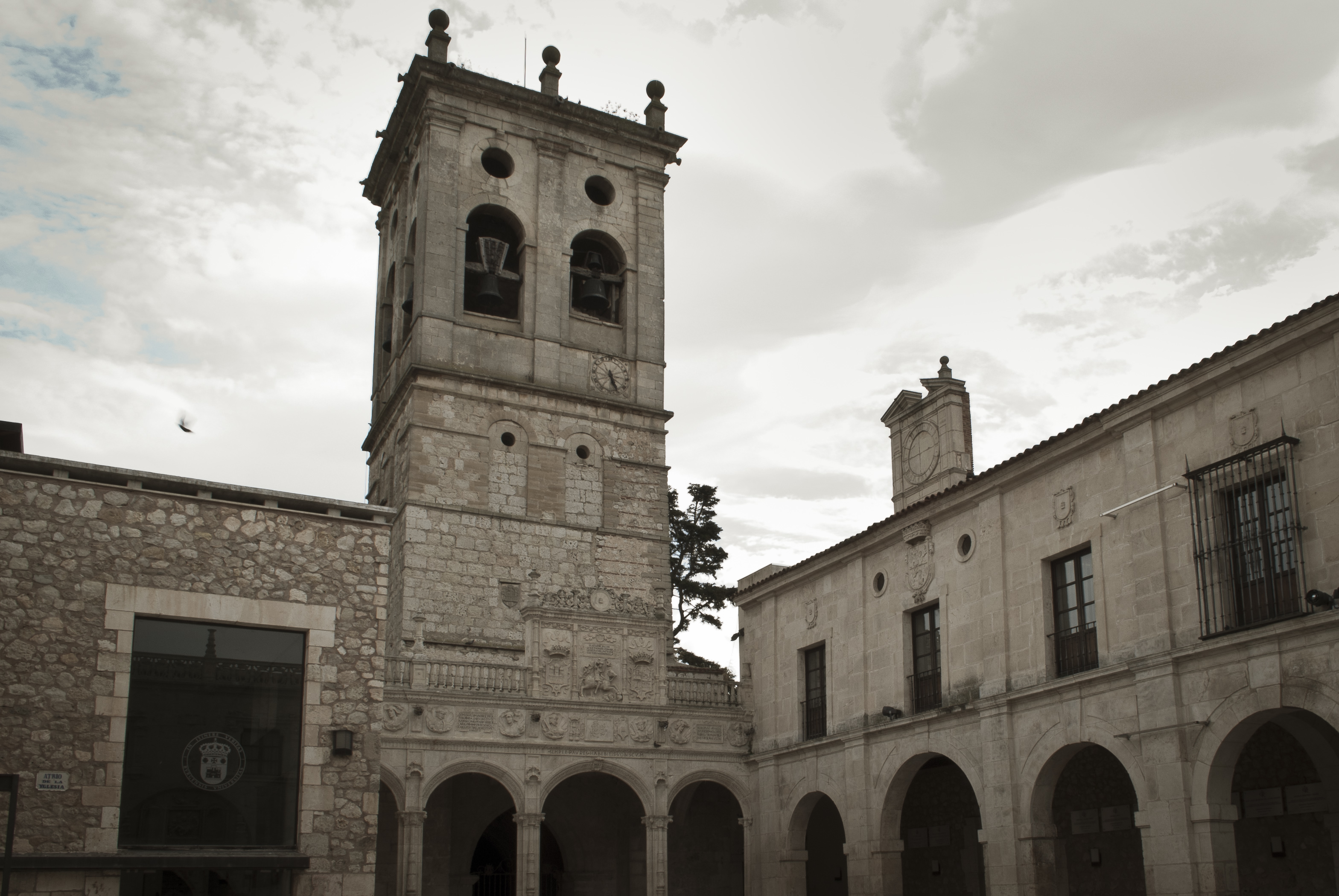
View of the Hospital del Rey in Burgos, whose jurisdiction was disputed between the city and the abbess of Las Huelgas at the end of the Middle Ages.

From the beginning of the 16th century, the city of Burgos had sought to prevent the abbess of Las Huelgas from exercising civil and criminal jurisdiction over the Royal Monastery and Royal Hospital. In 1516, already serving as alcalde mayor, Juan Zumel went there with a notary and several armed men, but he met with the opposition of the monastery's bailiff, who shut the gates against him. The following day he issued writs of imprisonment against the alcalde of the precinct and the residents who had assisted him, after which he arrested several of them and summoned the rest by public proclamation.

In response, the abbess of Las Huelgas turned to the Chancellería of Valladolid to defend her rights and, at the same time, ordered her attorney to obtain a favorable ruling from the regent Francisco Jiménez de Cisneros. After consulting the case with the president and judges of the tribunal, on 2 December 1516 Zumel was ordered to release the prisoners under penalty of 50,000 maravedís, and the council of Burgos was instructed not to alter anything regarding the matter until the lawsuit was resolved.

Zumel, however, did not relent, and instead sent the alcalde of the precinct a crier accompanied by armed men to summon certain residents, while the city's attorney filed a lawsuit against the monastery's representative.

On the abbess's behalf, the attorney Juan de Calderón protested before the regent and asked him to enforce the earlier order, so that Zumel would appear before the Chancellery and be sentenced according to the stated penalties. Although the council of Burgos rose to its own defense, the tribunal of Valladolid told Cisneros it was necessary to send another letter to the city. He did so on 28 March 1517, doubling the previous fine to 100,000 maravedís. This new warning, however, had little effect, since the abbess and the commander of the Hospital had to lodge another complaint against alcalde Zumel:

In recent days, amid the disturbances and unrest that have occurred, you reportedly wished to go with an armed force, raising the cry of "Community," with much scandal and uproar, to the precincts, to exercise in fact the civil and criminal jurisdiction that has never, from time immemorial, been exercised or customary there. They fear and suspect that you intend to cause them further injuries and wrongs against the content and form of the enclosed letters and other of our letters and privileges that they hold from us and from the kings, our predecessors.

— Judgment of the lawsuit.

=== Chief notary of the council and criminal court of Burgos ===
On 23 September 1516 Juan Zumel requested to exchange his office of alcalde mayor for that of chief notary of the council and criminal court. Three months later, on 20 December of that year, the monarch Charles I approved his appointment – later confirmed on 16 April 1517 – since the holder of the office, Gonzalo Pérez de Cartagena, had tendered his resignation and sent his original title to the Court so that it could be annulled and destroyed.

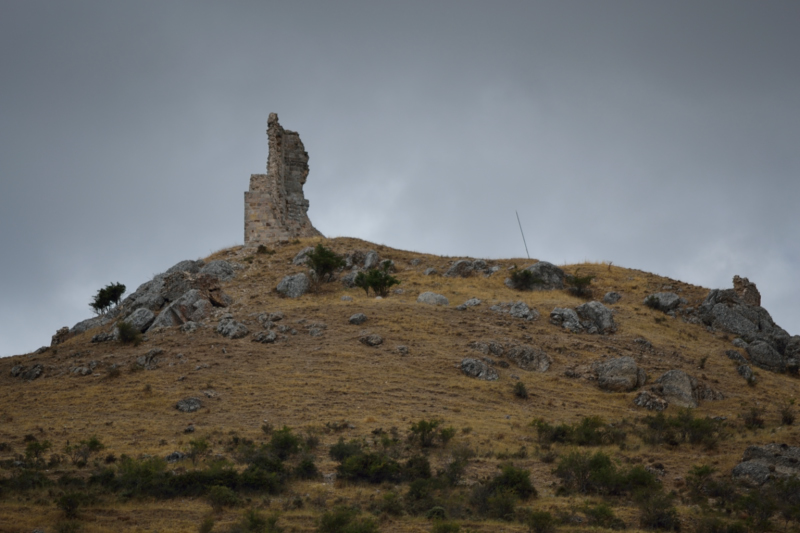
Remains of the castle of Lara de los Infantes, later granted to the foreigner Joffre de Cottanes.

As chief notary, Zumel collaborated with Diego Osorio and the representatives of León and Valladolid in drafting the letter that Burgos and these two cities sent to Charles I, urging him to come to Castile as soon as possible. On 17 February 1517, moreover, the council of Burgos ordered him to take possession of the castle of Lara de los Infantes, which lay unguarded. Zumel went there, gathered information on how its alcaide had abandoned it, drew up an inventory of the weapons, equipment, and movable goods found there, and finally handed it over to Pedro de Porres, from whom he received an oath of feudal homage.

=== Cortes of 1518 ===
==== Initial protests and royal pressure ====
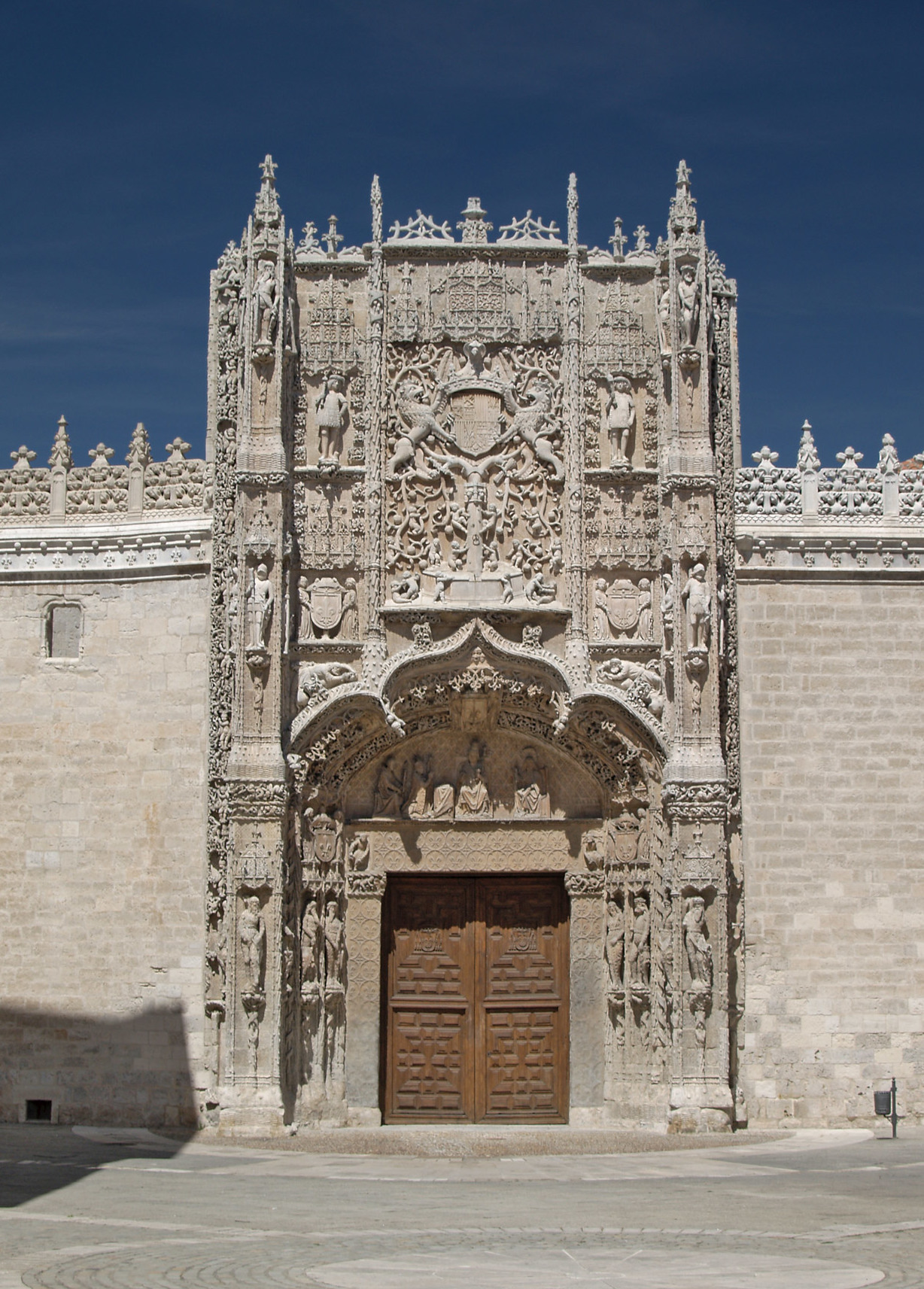
Façade of the Colegio de San Gregorio, in Valladolid, where the procurators met to hold the Cortes of 1518

In 1518 Zumel was appointed by the council of Burgos to attend the Cortes of Valladolid, together with councilman Diego de Soria. His conduct there is well documented by historians: on 2 February, before the first session began, he protested on behalf of the others against the appointment of two foreigners to the most important offices of the Cortes of Castilla – that of Jean Sauvage as president, alongside bishop Pedro Ruiz de la Mota, and that of a certain Maestrejos as assistant – requesting that his complaint be recorded by secretary Bartolomé Ruiz de Castañeda.

Hispanist historian Joseph Pérez agrees with Manuel Giménez Fernández in downplaying the significance of the Burgos procurator's conduct, describing it as a simple verbal protest by someone who, having long belonged to the Constable's circle, sought to express the sentiments of part of the Castilian nobility, uneasy at the position held by the Flemish in the new administration and disappointed at being kept away from the centers of power.

Chronicler Prudencio de Sandoval, for his part, left an account of the royal pressure applied to both Burgos procurators as a result of their stance. According to him, Charles ordered them to appear at the chancellor's palace for a meeting with him, bishop Mota, and the jurist García de Padilla. Out of fear and caution, the procurators from Valladolid and Seville decided to accompany them. Once there, according to the chronicler, the camarilla reportedly reproached Zumel harshly for his conduct in "stirring up sentiment":

The young courtiers answered him with great anger, saying that he had incurred the penalty of death and forfeiture of property, and that they would therefore order him arrested as a disloyal subject of the king.

— Prudencio de Sandoval, History of the Life and Deeds of the Emperor Charles V.

Zumel reported what had happened to his colleagues and personally presented a petition to Le Sauvage asking the monarch to confirm the articles agreed upon in the previous Cortes. They then met with Mota and García de Padilla, who in turn met with William de Croÿ, lord of Chièvres and royal counselor, to decide what to do. After keeping them waiting for some time, they replied that they would bring the petition to the king's attention, while also remarking negatively on the boldness of "petitioning the king before knowing what His Highness would wish to command." Zumel is said to have replied that his intention was to warn Charles of the kingdom's needs so as to avoid any disturbance or defiance of his authority.

Le Sauvage then sent secretary Villegas to summon Doctor Zumel. Fearing the worst, the procurators of Córdoba and Granada stationed themselves by the door of the president of the Cortes's chamber and waited for Zumel to come out safe and sound.

==== Vote on the subsidy and royal favors to Zumel ====
On 5 February Charles confirmed the words of the speech read by Mota, and Juan Zumel rose to thank him for coming to Castile and to reiterate the requests made earlier. The procurators and the monarch then took their oaths.

On 9 February bishop Mota delivered a new speech – the royal proposition – in which he justified requesting a large extraordinary subsidy from the kingdom. Zumel, on behalf of all the procurators, asked for time to deliberate. He gave the same answer the following day when Mota indicated his wish that the subsidy be larger than previous ones, owing to the monarch's pressing needs. It was finally voted formally on 14 February, on the terms set by Charles: two hundred million maravedís payable over three years.

Since Zumel ultimately accepted the subsidy requested by the king, historian Manuel Danvila y Collado has argued that the Court was able to soften his initial resistance through the grant, on 15 March 1518, of 200 gold ducats, that is, 75,000 maravedís:

To Dr. Zumel, on 15 March, 200 gold ducats were granted, to buy off his arrogance.

— Manuel Danvila, Critical and Documented History of the Comunidades of Castile.

A royal decree of 15 March 1518 reveals that all of Dr. Zumel's firmness yielded to 200 gold ducats, or 75,000 maravedís, with which the Emperor favored him. From then on he was one of the Emperor's most committed partisans and risked his life and fortune in royal service, receiving in exchange great and repeated rewards.

— Ibid.

Domingo Hergueta y Martín criticized Danvila harshly for these claims. For the Navarrese historian, the grant in no way conditioned Zumel's conduct, because it was, in fact, entirely customary for monarchs to grant favors to procurators, especially in the Cortes in which they were sworn in as such. He further cited another grant, dated one day after the first, authorizing Zumel to resign his office of chief notary of Burgos whenever, however, and to whomever he wished. He included the royal justification, which, in his view, proved that the favors granted to Zumel during these Cortes resulted from custom and not from corruption:

In recognition of the many good and loyal services you have rendered and continue to render us daily, and the many hardships you have endured in coming as procurator of the said city to the Cortes that we ordered held in the noble town of Valladolid this present year of the date of this our letter (1518), and the expenses you have incurred in pursuing the above, and in some amendment and remuneration thereof, and knowing that when the procurators of past Cortes came to swear allegiance to the kings our predecessors, they were customarily granted similar favors (...)

— Royal decree issued in Valladolid on 16 March 1518 by Charles I, inserted in the minute-book of the Burgos City Council for the year 1534.

=== Other relevant business in Burgos ===
On 15 January 1519 the council of Burgos decided to appeal the decree by which the monarch had ordered the castle of Lara handed over to the foreigner Joffre de Cottanes, and chose Zumel to draft the relevant document, which was to be sent to the Court. He accordingly did so, arguing that the grant, besides violating the city's privileges, "does not serve His Highness, beyond the harm the city suffers." Nevertheless, the king never reversed his decision, and Cottanes retained possession of the castle until the outbreak of the Revolt of the Comuneros, when he lost his life at the hands of an enraged mob.

More than a year after the council lodged that appeal, on 19 February 1520 Charles I arrived at the gates of Burgos. There Juan Zumel joined the welcoming party, alongside the alcaldes and the chief merino, and asked the monarch to stop and swear upon a missal that he held, that he would respect all the privileges, customs, and traditions of the city. Two days later he was also given the council's commission to ask Charles to extend his stay until 27 February, which the king granted.

=== Revolt of the Comuneros ===
The voting of a new Cortes subsidy and Charles's departure for the Holy Roman Empire, where he was to be crowned emperor, led to a series of urban uprisings in the main cities of Castile, which organized themselves into an assembly called the Santa Junta and began drafting a political program meant to reorganize the country's political and economic system. Burgos, the city where Zumel resided, also joined the general revolt against the monarch. However, the appointment of the Constable of Castile Íñigo Fernández de Velasco and admiral Fadrique Enríquez as viceroys, alongside the already appointed Adrian of Utrecht, brought about a shift in the balance of forces in the civil war, a shift that helped lead Burgos, in October and November 1520, toward breaking away from the comunero side.

==== Activities in Burgos ====
By the second half of October 1520, Juan Zumel had become the Constable's representative in Burgos and negotiated with the city's leading citizens the city's return to royal obedience. For these activities he suffered not only the looting of his house but also imprisonment for some time, as can be inferred from several letters and the minute-book of the Burgos council. Thus, at the session of 5 March 1521, councilman Juan Martínez Fernández was instructed to write to the king a letter "informing him of the damage caused to the house of his colleague Zumel and how he was imprisoned for serving him, asking His Majesty to compensate him for his good services, as justice demanded." It is also possible that Zumel, as chief notary, drafted the letter Burgos sent to the Holy Junta on 11 November 1520, reproaching its defiance of Charles I and justifying the city's withdrawal from the rebel movement. Zumel's support for the royalist cause was not limited to politics, as he also lent 15,000 ducats to the viceroys, who were always in need of funds to continue the war.

Owing to the services rendered to the royalist cause and the risk to his life, the Constable repeatedly asked the king for some favor on his behalf, chiefly that he be admitted to the Royal Council:

I have likewise written to Your Majesty entreating you to admit Doctor Zumel to your Council, which he well deserves for what he has served in a time when his person was in great danger; and since Your Majesty has not answered me regarding the other matters of his service, I do not wish to complain of this one, in which I would receive great favor. I again entreat Your Majesty to grant me this favor, for I stand as guarantor that Your Highness shall be well served by him, and it likewise suits me well that in your Council there should be a person who takes special care of my affairs.

— Letter from the Constable to the king, dated in Burgos on 2 January 1521.

Within Burgos, his conduct was rewarded with the grant of various offices and commissions. Thus, on 14 February 1521 the city's councilmen appointed him inspector of the currency and review judge for livestock. At the same session he was also commissioned, together with Juan de Rojas and councilman Santander, to write a letter to the Royal Council. The following day he was appointed "head of the city's troops, to assist the soldiers bringing artillery, should the towns offer resistance along the way," and three days later the council commissioned him to negotiate with the Royal Council the "general articles of the laws of the Kingdom." On 2 March he was tasked with answering Seville's letter approving Burgos's conduct, and on 11 April, Charles I's letter congratulating the city for its loyalty. At the session of 27 April he was also given the task of negotiating with the Council the concessions obtained regarding fairs, markets, and inns, and of requesting that the Chancellery be established in the city. Zumel set off for this meeting immediately, since by 4 May, and again on the 14th, he wrote to the local council from Medina del Campo. Back in Burgos, he attended the session of 3 June, at which he was named "advocate for the poor."

Months earlier, perhaps in April, he had been appointed captain of the Burgos men-at-arms who were to join the Constable's army. Zumel, however, chose to remain in the city and not take part in the military actions that ended in the comuneros' defeat on 23 April 1521, known as the Battle of Villalar.

==== Looting of his property in Valladolid ====
In the final days of January 1521, Zumel also suffered the looting, seizure, and public auctioning of his estate in Valladolid, a city then controlled by the rebels. Together with other property stolen in Burgos, the loss was estimated by the Constable at more than 4,000 ducats. A week later, on 8 February, despite the opposition of bachelor Alonso de Guadalajara, the Holy Junta also ordered the seizure of the 147 marks of silver he kept in the sacristy of the Iglesia Mayor, an amount Zumel later claimed through a lawsuit filed on 23 November 1521.

A royal decree of 11 October 1521 instructed licentiate Minjaca, in a commission later extended to licentiate Villa, to determine what property had been taken from him in Valladolid "at the time the said town was in rebellion." On 16 May 1522, the latter was ordered to carry out the sentence he had handed down regarding Zumel's confiscated silver, without hearing any appeals to the contrary.

==== Activity in Valencia and Toledo ====
After being appointed Court alcalde by the Constable, in August 1521 Zumel was already with the prior of San Juan at the siege of Toledo, a city still holding out. He then went to the viceroys' residence and, after the arrival of friars seeking peace negotiations, to the city of Valencia, which he managed to bring back to royal obedience after it had been the birthplace of the rebel Germanías movement.

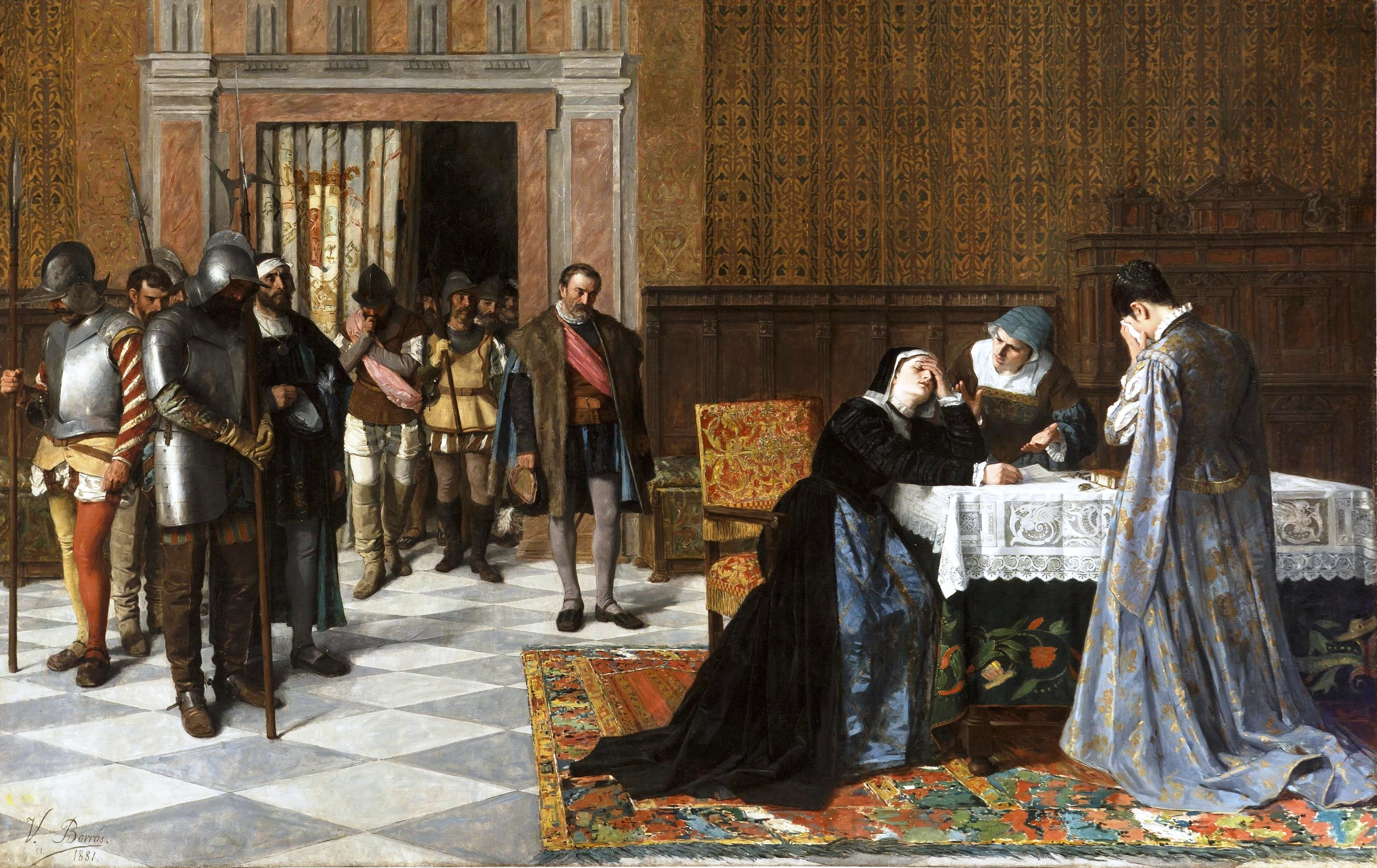
Doña María Pacheco After Villalar, by Vicente Borrás y Mompó, 1881 (Museo del Prado, Madrid). On 31 October 1521, following negotiations, the archbishop of Bari secured the conditional surrender of Toledo, agreeing to a capitulation that granted the city certain guarantees.

In December 1521 he was back in Toledo, a city already pacified since November, to impose unrestricted repression against the former comuneros. This task, together with the numerous death sentences he handed down during those months, earned him the enmity of the people of Toledo. One night, leaving the house of María Pacheco – widow of captain Juan de Padilla – he came across a crowd of one hundred to one hundred fifty people, one of whom threatened him menacingly:

Honor what was agreed, or I swear to God you shall hang from a battlement.

— Court testimony of Francisco Marañón, answer to question number 13.

He apparently also took part in drafting a new text of capitulation that, on the morning of 3 February 1522, was proclaimed by the new authorities and which, unlike the one signed on 25 October 1521 with the archbishop of Bari, established the complete defeat of the Community. This further heightened tensions in Toledo and led to an open uprising that very day, when the comuneros attempted to free from prison a man Zumel had sentenced to hang without trial, following the unrest of the previous night. With the defeat of the rebels and the flight of Padilla's widow, Zumel had a free hand to carry out the repression effectively. As a first measure, he ordered the house of Juan de Padilla torn down, plowed, and sown with salt, and on its site he erected a column bearing a defamatory plaque commemorating the supposed misfortunes the rebellion fomented by the Toledo councilman had brought upon the kingdom: (Note: On 14 April 1526 Zumel obtained from the monarch a royal letter protecting him from any future legal action by the heirs of Juan de Padilla, particularly his brothers.)

This was the house of Juan de Padilla and his wife, doña María Pacheco, in which, by them and others who joined their wicked purpose, all the uprisings, disturbances, and treasons that took place in this city and in these kingdoms against the service of His Majesty in the year 1521 were planned. The very noble lord don Juan de Zumel, judge of His Majesty and chief justice of this city, ordered it torn down by his special command, because they acted against their king and queen and against their city, deceiving it under the guise of the public good for their own interest or ambition, on account of the evils that resulted; and because, after the pardon granted by Their Majesties to the residents of this city who took part in the above, they gathered again in the said house with the said doña María Pacheco, intending to raise this city once more and kill all the ministers of justice and servants of His Majesty. Over this they fought against the said justice and royal banner, and the traitors were defeated on Monday, the feast of San Blas, 3 February 1522.

— Inscription placed by Zumel on the site of Juan de Padilla's house.

For some two months he relentlessly pursued the former comuneros who still remained in the city – passing death sentences against María Pacheco and Hernando de Ávalos, among others –, (Note: On 22 January 1522 the Royal Council and prosecutor Pero Ruiz requested copies of the sentences already issued by Zumel, and months later, on 5 October of the same year, a decree instructed the corregidor of Toledo to review them.) burned and destroyed most of the documents issued by the city's rebel bodies – including the City Council's minute-book –, and declared null the exemption from alcabalas (sales taxes) that the city claimed, since the document invoked by the people of Toledo appeared to be a forgery. The Constable described his conduct in the city as follows:

After the archbishop of Bari left Toledo, Doctor Zumel remained, dispensing great justice, until he subdued it and brought it to such a state that it appears no Community ever passed through it (...)

— Letter from the Constable to the king, dated 25 April 1522 in Vitoria.

On 18 February 1522 he was appointed alcalde mayor of Toledo while the archbishop of Bari was absent, until the new justice official took up his staff of office. On 7 April the city and the council of jurors praised him for his services to the crown and requested that he be rewarded. He, for his part, was sent to the Court in July, together with Juan Pedro de Cartagena, to find out whether the monarch was returning from Flanders and intended to visit Burgos.

==== Royal grants received ====
On 12 May 1521 a royal decree promised Zumel the public notary's office of Segovia, should its holder, Francisco de Ruescar, be convicted for his part in the revolt. He was also ordered to seize the property of the comuneros Antonio Suárez and Bernardino de San Román.

Another royal decree, issued from Brussels on 26 September 1521, appointed him judge of the Royal Chancellery, replacing licentiate Siso. In a letter of 10 March 1522 the Burgos magistrate thanked the Crown for this favor, though without expressing full satisfaction. According to him, in Valladolid his services were not well known, nor was it a city in which he could do much in the king's favor ("it was not a place where I could best serve His Majesty").

The king also granted him 120,000 maravedís as compensation for the robberies and damage suffered in Burgos, though he later appeared reluctant to pay the sum. Indeed, on 6 May 1522 Juan Zumel asked the monarch to at least grant him a fraction of what he had spent in royal service, reminding him that his actions in Toledo had brought 400,000 ducats into the royal treasury in alcabalas, and that his own financial situation was very dire.

=== Guardian of Atanasio de Ayala ===
After the death of the rebel count of Salvatierra, Pedro López de Ayala, his son Atanasio had to pursue a lawsuit to recover the possessions that had belonged to his father, then confiscated by the Crown and sold to private individuals. As Atanasio was a minor, he was given Juan Zumel as guardian, who, in that capacity, in 1525 witnessed the signing of an agreement allowing the rebel nobleman's son to inherit the portions of the fief not yet sold and to negotiate with the purchasers for the return of the remaining lands.

Atanasio rewarded his guardian, as can be seen from a perpetual rent from the count of Salvatierra's estate that Zumel left to the Hospitals of Esgueva and of the Misericordia, in Valladolid, consisting of an income of 143,030½ maravedís, drawn on the alcabalas, tercias, rents, lordship, and dues of the town of Ampudia.

=== Other services to the Constable ===
The Constable Velasco, as lord of Medina de Pomar, appointed Zumel judge in a fiscal dispute between that town and its villages. The Burgos magistrate delivered his ruling on 12 September 1523, but since the parties were unwilling to accept it, on 10 October of the same year, in Valladolid, he had to issue a new settlement, ruling that Medina de Pomar should pay 83⅓ pechos (tax units) and the villages 40¾ pechos, each pecho valued at 527½ maravedís.

On 15 March 1524 Zumel signed the deed restoring the income of the notary's office to the town of Haro, on behalf of the Constable and his wife María de Tovar. Years later he was appointed alcalde mayor of Villalpando by them. It was while holding this office that Zumel purchased the chapel and main altar of the church of Santa María la Antigua in Valladolid, for his own burial and that of his wife:

=== Cortes of Toledo of 1525 ===
After the Revolt of the Comuneros, Zumel was again chosen to serve as a procurator at the Cortes, this time at those of Toledo in 1525, together with Francisco Sarmiento. On 2 June, a day after the opening session, the royal proposition was read, and Zumel replied on behalf of all the procurators, requesting permission to deliberate on the matter of the subsidy, which was ultimately voted unanimously.

On 25 August, a week after the Cortes ended, Juan Zumel received 200 gold ducats (the same amount as in Valladolid in 1518) for his services to the king and in settlement and satisfaction of any office held. He was also granted 120,000 maravedís in compensation for the damage suffered in Burgos and for relinquishing a council seat in Toledo and a notary's office in Segovia.

On 14 November 1527 he was asked to swear whether Francisco Sarmiento, his fellow procurator, had received the corresponding payment.

=== Final activities in Burgos ===
On 11 October 1527 the council commissioned Juan Zumel to send two messengers to summon the craftsmen and trumpet banners for Charles's reception in the city. A week later, he was charged, together with others, with drafting a memorandum addressed to the Royal Council concerning ecclesiastical matters. The monarch's entrance into Burgos took place on 7 November, and in the procession Zumel was placed behind the alcaldes mayores.

In 1531 a dispute arose between the city council of Burgos and the cathedral chapter, which sought to move the choir up to the main chapel, where it had originally been located. Doctor Zumel undertook to negotiate with the cathedral chapter and, in particular, to speak with the Constable to persuade him to use his influence in the city's favor, which he ultimately did.

== Death and will ==
Zumel continued to hold his office of chief notary in Burgos until eight days before his death. Gravely ill, and exercising the privilege the king had granted him following the Cortes of Valladolid of 1518, on 8 April 1534, before the notary Alonso de Benavente, he resigned the office in favor of his nephew Juan Zumel Saravia. A little more than a week later, most likely on Thursday, 16 April 1534, he died. (Note: At the start of the session of 16 April 1534, the City Council's minute-book records a heading reading "Death of Zumel." A marginal note written after the session ends states: "On this day it was confirmed that the lord Doctor Zumel, chief notary, had died, and afterward his nephew the lord Juan Zumel [Saravia] took his place and left me as his deputy." A marginal note bearing Zumel's name, written in a different hand from that of the session's text, also appears in the "Book of Chapters of the Hospital de Esgueva." By the 19th, the doctor's funeral honors were already being discussed.)

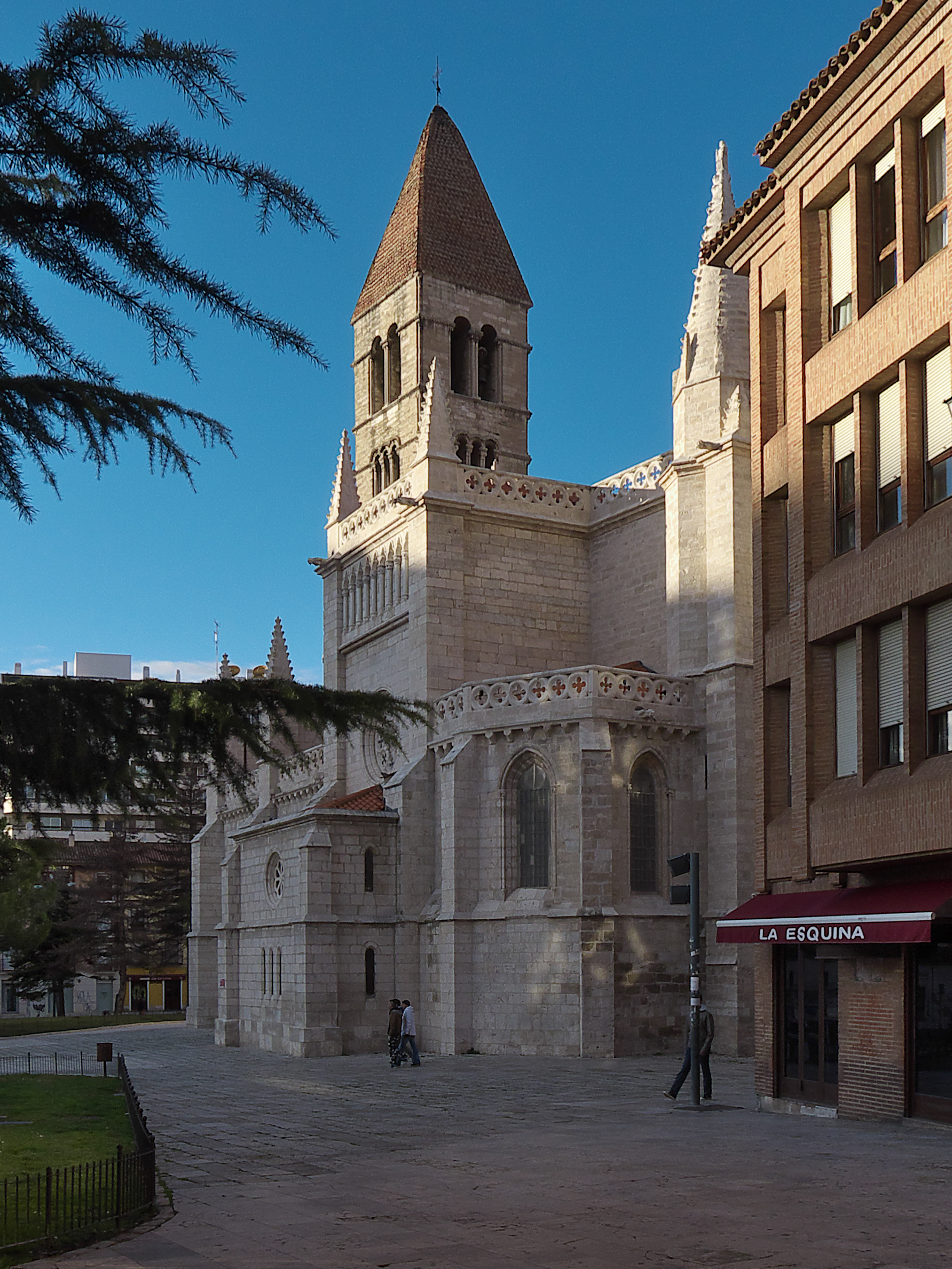
View of the church of Santa María la Antigua, in Valladolid, where Juan Zumel asked to be buried

In his will, drawn up on the same date as his death, he stipulated that all his estate should pass to his wife Catalina de Estrada, provided "she does not change her status or condition"; that he be buried in the church of Nuestra Señora de la Antigua, in Valladolid, upon the steps of the main chapel; that 150,000 maravedís in cash (or, equivalently, 5,000 maravedís in annual income) be set aside as an endowment for the burial; that an income of 10,000 maravedís be purchased from his estate to fund a perpetual chaplaincy that would pray for his soul with six masses each week; that the said chaplain be appointed by his wife and, after her death, by the lay parishioners of the said church, always ensuring that the person chosen was suitable and would reside in the choir on Sundays, at Easter, and on feast days, and that for each absence half a real would be deducted from him and given to those who did attend; and finally, that should the parishioners refuse to grant him that burial place, he should be buried wherever his wife wished, whether inside or outside the church.

As for his widow, Catalina de Estrada, she made her will on 21 May 1540 before Juan de Colmenares and died five days later. Her remaining property passed to her sister, Isabel de Rohenes.

== See also ==
- Rodrigo Ronquillo

== Bibliography ==
- Hergueta y Martín, Domingo (1923). Noticias históricas del doctor Zumel [Historical News on Doctor Zumel] (PDF) (in Spanish). Burgos: Tipografía de «El Monte Carmelo».
- Danvila y Collado, Manuel (1897–1900). Historia crítica y documentada de las Comunidades de Castilla [Critical and Documented History of the Comunidades of Castile]. Colección de documentos, opúsculos, y antigüedades que publica la Real Academia de Historia; 35-40 (in Spanish). Vol. 6 volumes. Madrid: Memorial Histórico Español.
- Pérez, Joseph (1977). La revolución de las Comunidades de Castilla (1520-1521) [The Revolution of the Comunidades of Castile (1520-1521)] (in Spanish). Siglo XXI de España Editores. ISBN 9788432302664.
- Martínez Gil, Fernando (1981). Toledo en las Comunidades de Castilla [Toledo in the Comunidades of Castile] (PDF) (in Spanish). I. P. I. E. T., Diputación Provincial.
- Sandoval, Prudencio de (1681). Historia de la vida y hechos del emperador Carlos V [History of the Life and Deeds of the Emperor Charles V] (in Spanish). Impreso por Geronymo Verdussen.
- Manrique, Cayetano (1876). Historia de la legislación y recitaciones del derecho civil de España, volumen IX [History of the Legislation and Recitations of the Civil Law of Spain, volume IX] (in Spanish). Imprenta Nacional.
- Martínez Marina, Francisco (1813). Teoría de las Cortes ó Grandes Juntas Nacionales de los reinos de León y Castilla: monumentos de su constitución política y de la soberanía del pueblo, volumen I [Theory of the Cortes or Great National Assemblies of the Kingdoms of León and Castile: Monuments of Their Political Constitution and the Sovereignty of the People, volume I] (in Spanish). Imprenta de Fermín Villapando.
- González García, Casimiro (1980). Valladolid, sus recuerdos y sus grandezas: religión, historia, ciencias, literatura, industria, comercio y política, volumen 1 [Valladolid, Its Memories and Its Grandeurs: Religion, History, Sciences, Literature, Industry, Commerce, and Politics, volume 1] (in Spanish). Imprenta de José Rodríguez Hernando. ISBN 9788450040654.
