= Teodósio, Prince of Brazil =

Teodósio
- Prince of Brazil, Duke of Braganza (more...)
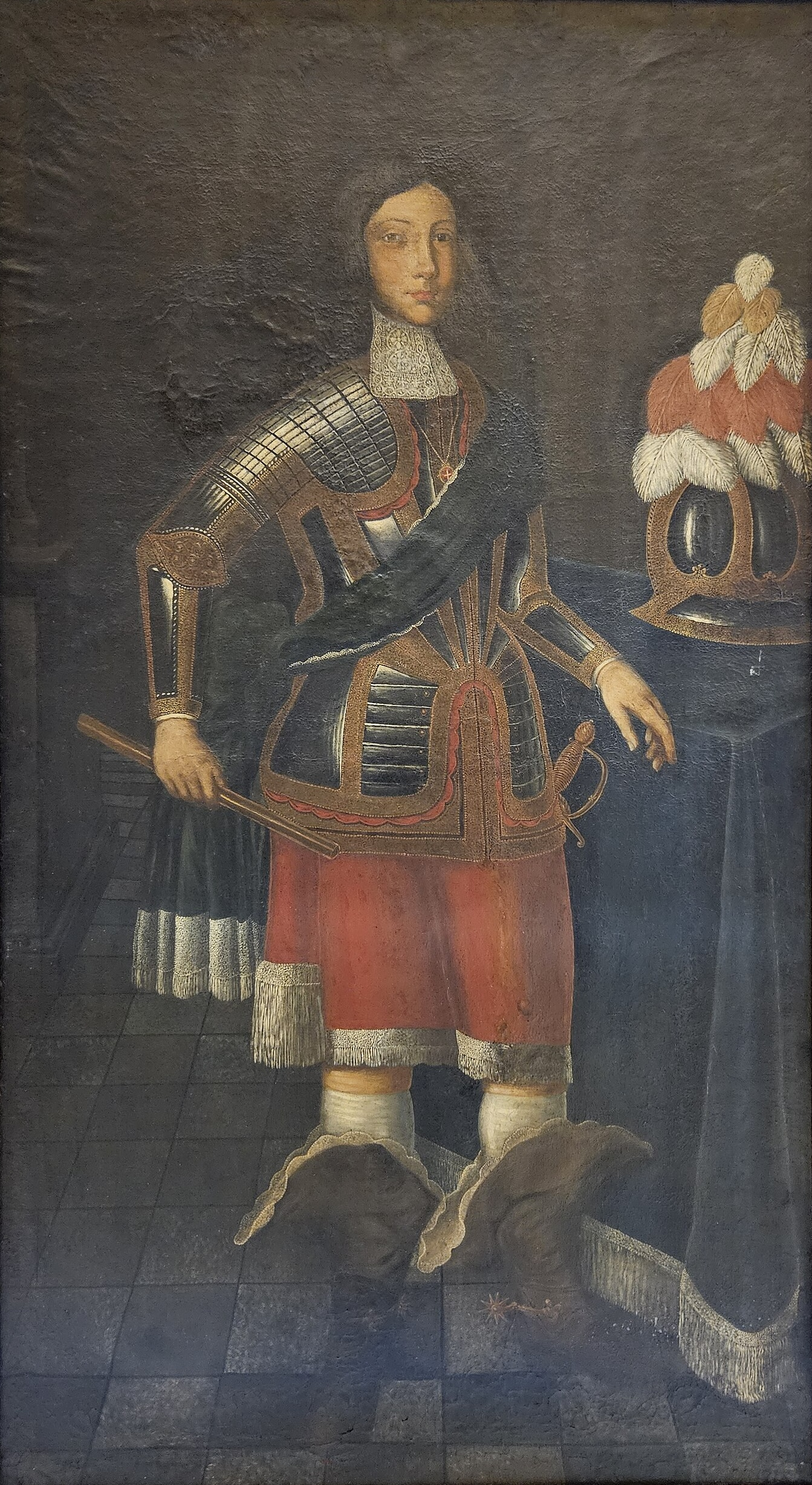
- Born: 8 February 1634; Ducal Palace of Vila Viçosa, Vila Viçosa, Portugal
- Died: 15 May 1653 (aged 19); Royal Palace of Alcântara, Alcântara, Lisbon, Portugal
- Burial: Pantheon of the Braganzas
- House: House of Braganza
- Father: John IV of Portugal
- Mother: Luisa de Guzmán

Dom Teodósio, Prince of Brazil, Duke of Braganza (Teodósio de Bragança; Portuguese pronunciation: [tiuˈðɔziu]; 8 February 1634 – 15 May 1653) was the eldest son of John IV of Portugal and heir apparent to the Portuguese throne from 1640 until his death. In 1645, he was created Prince of Brazil and 9th Duke of Braganza.

== Biography ==
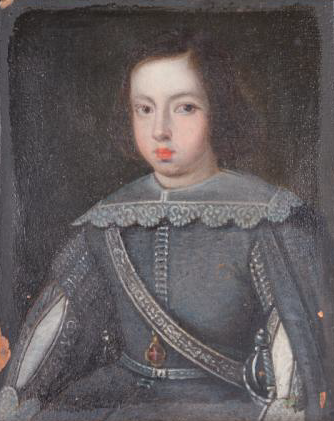
Portrait of the Prince of Brazil as a child.

Born on 8 February 1634 in Vila Viçosa, Teodósio was the first child of John IV of Portugal and Luisa de Guzmán, then the Duke and Duchess of Braganza. Shortly after birth, he was granted the title Duke of Barcelos.

In December 1640, John was proclaimed King John IV of Portugal by the Portuguese nobility, marking the end of the 60-year-old Iberian Union and establishing the House of Braganza on the Portuguese throne. A month later, on 28 January 1641, Teodósio was sworn in as heir apparent by the Portuguese Cortes. Seeking to grant a more prestigious title that would reflect the grandeur of the new dynasty, John IV created the title Prince of Brazil and bestowed it, alongside the title of Duke of Braganza, upon Teodósio in a royal decree issued 27 October 1645.

In 1646, John IV attempted to secure a dynastic alliance with France by proposing Teodósio marry Louis XIII's niece, La Grande Mademoiselle. Desperate to solidify the match, John secretly proposed abdicating his throne in favor of Teodósio. Later, António Vieira suggested to fellow Jesuits that the prince marry a Spanish princess. Both schemes amounted to nothing.

Teodósio received a comprehensive education aimed at preparing him for governance. He was interested in philosophy, astronomy, mathematics, and watchmaking. In addition to his native Portuguese, Teodósio mastered Greek, Latin, Italian, and Castilian. He began participating in State Council meetings in 1649. The focus on a humanist curriculum drew criticism from nobles who advocated for Teodósio's engagement in military service as befitting his role as crown prince.

Against his father's wishes, Teodósio ran away from court to join an army in Alentejo at seventeen years old. After being persuaded to return, he was given the title Captain-General of Arms in January 1652.

== Death ==
Afflicted with tuberculosis in late 1652, Teodósio died on 15 May 1653. His death, deemed a "major disaster for the regime", deeply impacted his parents. His younger sister, Catherine, would remember him throughout her life and request to be buried beside him when drafting her will more than forty years later.

Teodósio's brother, the medically and mentally problem-ridden Afonso, succeeded him as Prince of Brazil, Duke of Braganza and heir apparent of the kingdom.

== See also ==
- Prince of Brazil
- Afonso VI of Portugal
- Pedro II of Portugal

== Ancestry ==
Ancestors of Teodósio, Prince of Brazil

8. João, 6th Duke of Braganza
4. Teodósio, 7th Duke of Braganza
9. Catarina of Portugal
2. John IV of Portugal
10. Juan, 5th Duke of Frías
5. Ana de Velasco y Girón
11. María Téllez-Girón y Guzmán
1. Teodósio, Prince of Brazil
12. Alonso, 7th Duke of Medina Sidonia
6. Manuel, 8th Duke of Medina Sidonia
13. Ana de Silva y Mendoza
3. Luisa de Guzmán
14. Francisco, 1st Duke of Lerma
7. Juana de Sandoval y la Cerda
15. Catalina de la Cerda y Portugal

Teodósio, Prince of Brazil House of Braganza Cadet branch of the House of Aviz Born: 8 February 1634 Died: 13 May 1653
Preceded by Balthasar Charles	Prince of Portugal; 1640–1645	Renaming of Title: Prince of Brazil
New title	Prince of Brazil; 1645–1653	Succeeded by Afonso
