= Duke of Frías =

Dukedom of Spain

Dukedom of Frías
- Creation date: 1492
- Created by: Isabella I
- Peerage: Peerage of Spain
- First holder: Bernardino Fernández de Velasco, 1st Duke of Frías
- Present holder: Francisco de Borja de Soto y Moreno-Santamaría, 19th Duke of Frías

Duke of Frías (Spanish: Duque de Frías) is a hereditary title in the peerage of Spain accompanied by the dignity of Grandee, created in 1492 by King Ferdinand II of Aragon and conferred to his son-in-law Don Bernardino Fernández de Velasco, 2nd Count of Haro, Constable of Castile, and Viceroy of Granada. It is one of the most important titles in Spain and one of the first titles to receive the honor of Grandee of Spain by Emperor Charles V in 1520.

The House of Velasco was one of the most powerful and influential noble Castilian families of the Middle Ages and the beginning of the Modern Era. Its original territories were situated around Burgos, Álava and eastern Cantabria. The lineage was of distant royal origin, being the Velascos a minor branch of the Astur-Leonese dynasty, but re-elevated when Don Juan de Velasco (1368–1418), was appointed hereditary Lord High Chamberlain-Chancellor or Camarero mayor to the Kings of Castile. His elder son, Pedro Fernández de Velasco, became the first Count of Haro.

When the 1st Count died in the 1470s, he was succeeded by his eldest son Pedro Fernández de Velasco, 2nd Count of Haro who became the hereditary Constable of Castile, the highest-ranking military office in Spain not considering the King. His son, Don Bernardino de Velasco, 3rd Count of Haro and second hereditary Constable of Castile, received the title of Duke of Frías. After becoming a widow, he then married Doña Juana de Aragón, illegitimate daughter of King Ferdinand II of Aragon.

In 1520, Emperor Charles V made the 2nd Duke of Frías one of the first Grandees of Spain, thus making the Dukedom of Frías one of the 25 most important titles in the Kingdom of Spain, known as of "Grandeza Inmemorial" or "Inmemorial Grandeeship".

== Counts of Haro (1430) ==
- Pedro Fernández de Velasco, 1st Count of Haro
- Pedro Fernández de Velasco, 2nd Count of Haro (1430–1492)

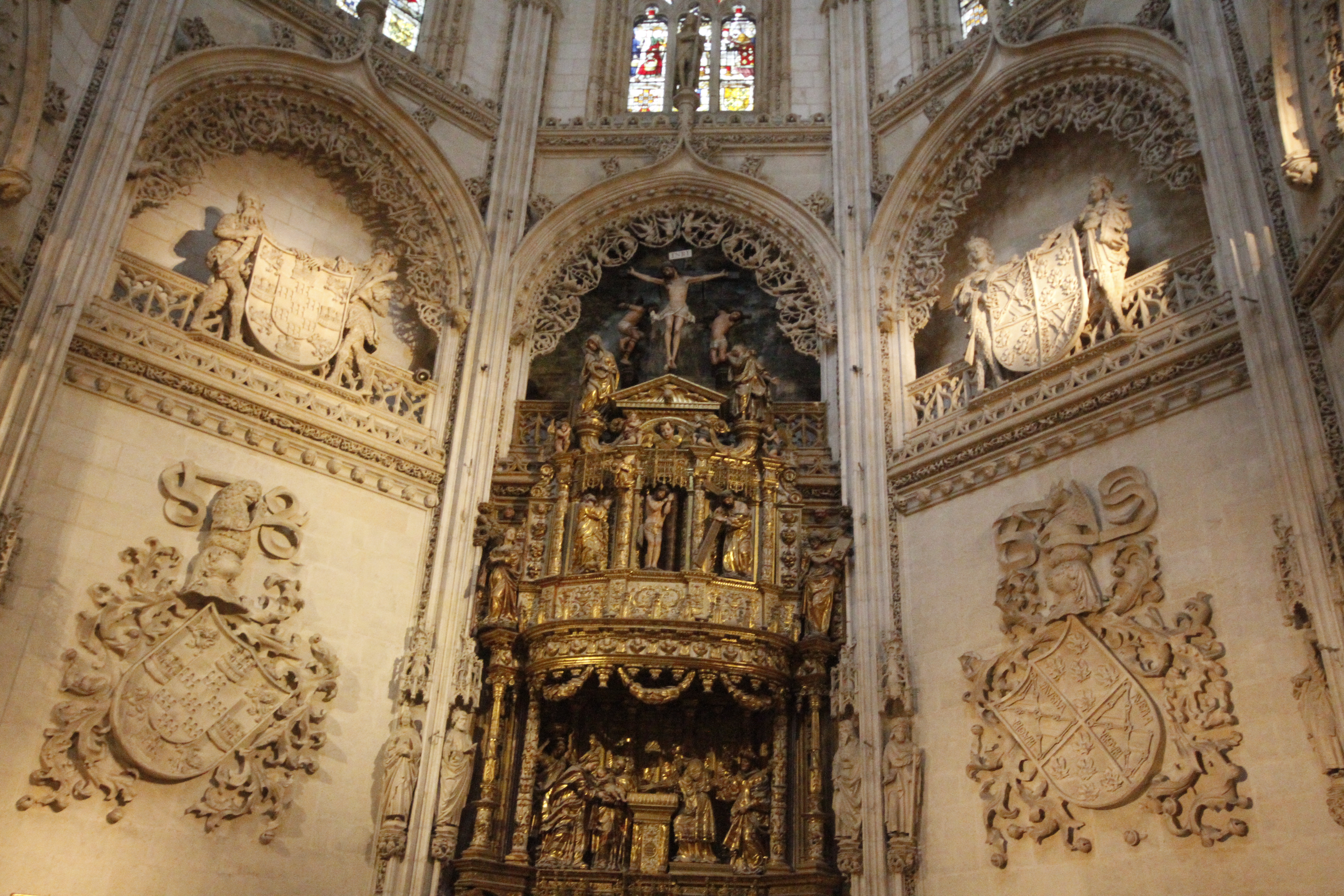
Chapel of the Dukes of Frías in the Cathedral of Burgos

== Dukes of Frías (1492) ==
- Bernardino Fernández de Velasco, 1st Duke of Frías (c.1450 - 9 February 1512)
- Íñigo Fernández de Velasco, 2nd Duke of Frías (c.1460 - 15 December 1528)
- Pedro Fernández de Velasco, 3rd Duke of Frías (c. 1485)
- Íñigo Fernández de Velasco, 4th Duke of Frías (c. 1530 - 1585)
- Juan Fernández de Velasco, 5th Duke of Frías (c. 1550 - 15 March 1613)
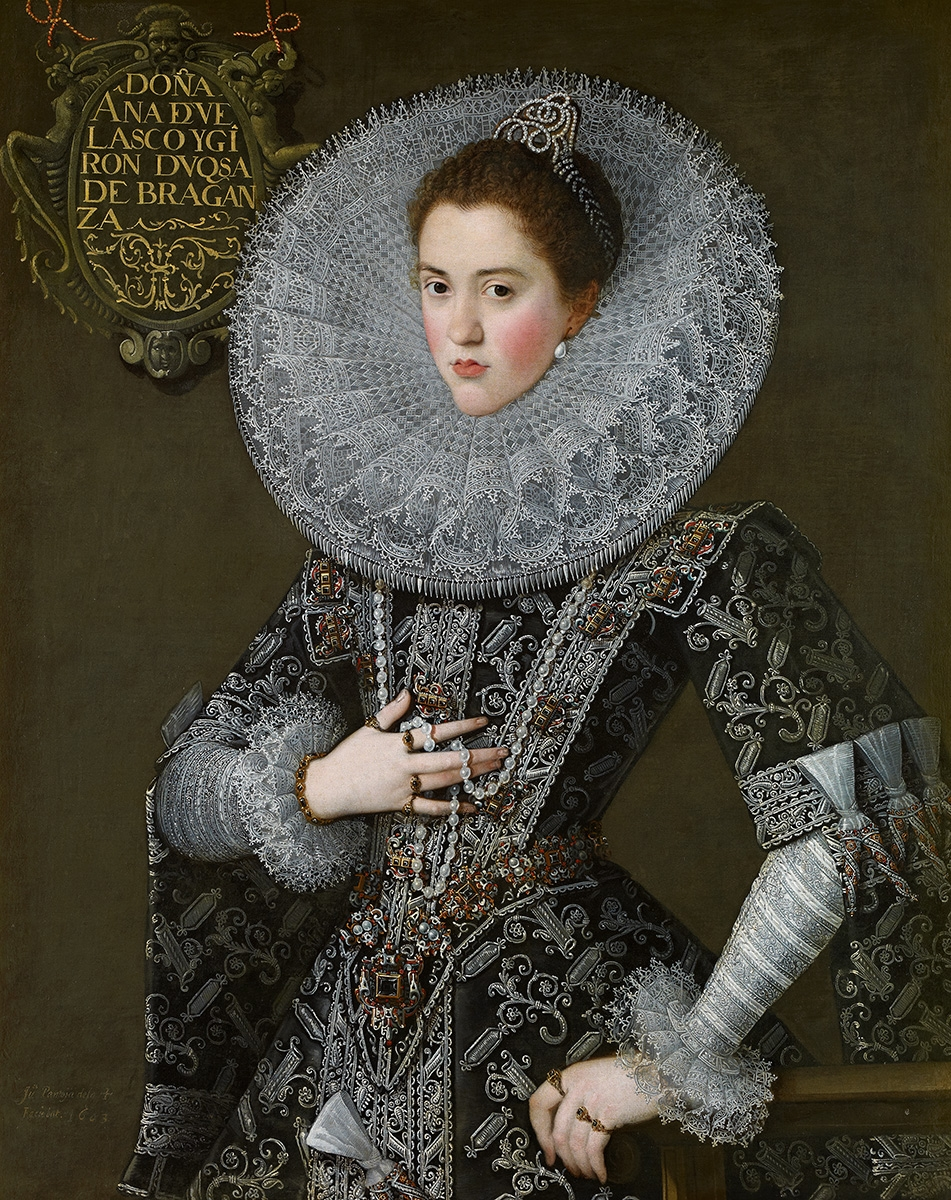
  Portrait of Ana de Velasco y Girón, daughter of the 5th Duke and mother of king John IV of Portugal, 1603
- Bernardino Fernández de Velasco, 6th Duke of Frías (c. 1610 - 1652)
- Íñigo Melchor de Velasco, 7th Duke of Frías (c. 1635 - 27 September 1696)
- José Fernández de Velasco y Tovar, 8th Duke of Frías (c. 1660 - 9 January 1713)
- Bernardino Fernández de Velasco y Tovar, 9th Duke of Frías (1685-1727)
- Agustín Fernández de Velasco, 10th Duke de Frías (1669-1741)
- Bernardino Fernández de Velasco, 11th Duke of Frías (1707-1771)
- Martín Fernández de Velasco, 12th Duke of Frías (1729-1776)
- Diego Fernández de Velasco, 13th Duke of Frías (1754–1811)
- Bernardino Fernández de Velasco, 14th Duke of Frías (1783-1851)
- José María Fernández de Velasco y Jaspe, 15th Duke of Frías (1836-1888)
- Bernardino Fernández de Velasco y Balfe, 16th Duke of Frías (1866-1916)
- Guillermo Fernández de Velascoy Balfe, 17th Duke of Frías (1870-1936)
- José María Fernández de Velasco y Sforza-Cesarini, 18th Duke of Frías (1910-1986)
- Francisco de Borja de Soto y Moreno-Santamaría, 19th Duke of Frías (1985-)

== See also ==
- List of dukes in the peerage of Spain
- List of current grandees of Spain

== Bibliography ==
- Hidalgos de España, Real Asociación de (2018). Elenco de Grandezas y Títulos Nobiliarios Españoles. Ediciones Hidalguía. ISBN 978-84-94841-02-6.
- Castro Pereira Mouzinho de Albuquerque e Cunha, Fernando de (1995). Instrumentário Genealógico - Linhagens Milenárias (in Portuguese). pp. 329–30.
- Costa Felgueiras Gaio, Manuel José da. Nobiliário das Famílias de Portugal (in Portuguese). Vol. VII. Portugal: Beltroens.
- Hobbs, Nicolas (2007). "Grandes de España" (in Spanish). Archived from the original on 2006-11-29.
- Sousa, Dom António Caetano de (1946). História Genealógica da Casa Real Portuguesa (in Portuguese). Vol. VI (2ª Edição ed.). Coimbra, Portugal: Atlântida-Livraria Editora, Lda. p. 323.
- Instituto de Salazar y Castro. Elenco de Grandezas y Titulos Nobiliarios Españoles (in Spanish). periodic publication.
- "Duques de Frías" (in Portuguese).
