= Pedro Fernández de Velasco, 3rd Duke of Frías =

Spanish nobleman

Pedro Fernández de Velasco, 3rd Duke of Frías (c. 1485 – 10 November 1559), Grandee of Spain (in full, Spanish: Don Pedro Fernández de Velasco y Tovar, tercer duque de Frías, quinto conde de Haro, noveno Condestable de Castilla, mayorazgo y señor de la Casa de Velasco) was a Spanish nobleman.

Fernández de Velasco was the son of Íñigo Fernández de Velasco, 2nd Duke of Frías and of Doña María de Tovar, Lady of Berlanga.
He married his cousin Doña Juliana de Velasco y Aragón, 1st Countess of Castilnovo, daughter of Bernardino Fernández de Velasco, 1st Duke of Frías in 1508, but they had no issue. He did have at least 7 illegitimate children from several mistresses. He succeeded as 3rd Duke of Frias in 1528.

He served as Captain General of the Royal army that fought against the Revolt of the Comuneros in 1521. From then on, the Emperor entrusted him with important military missions, and he even accompanied Charles V when he traveled to Italy for his coronation as Emperor in Bologna. The Duke also contributed troops and money to the campaigns against the Turks and the capture of Algiers. He served as Captain General of the Navarrese border until 1544, when he was relieved of his command due to health problems.

When he died in 1559, Pedro had no legitimate male issue, so his titles passed on to his nephew, Iñigo II Fernandez de Velasco, 4th Duke of Frias.

== Sources ==
- Castro Pereira Mouzinho de Albuquerque e Cunha, Fernando de (1995). Instrumentário Genealógico - Linhagens Milenárias (in Portuguese). pp. 329–30.
- Costa Felgueiras Gaio, Manuel José da. Nobiliário das Famílias de Portugal (in Portuguese). Vol. VII. Portugal: Beltroens.
- Hobbs, Nicolas (2007). "Grandes de España" (in Spanish). Archived from the original on November 29, 2006.
- Sousa, Dom António Caetano de (1946). História Genealógica da Casa Real Portuguesa (in Portuguese). Vol. VI (2ª Edição ed.). Coimbra, Portugal: Atlântida-Livraria Editora, Lda. p. 323.
- Instituto de Salazar y Castro. Elenco de Grandezas y Titulos Nobiliarios Españoles (in Spanish). periodic publication.

Military offices
Preceded by Íñigo; Fernández de Velasco	Constable of Castile; 1528–1559	Succeeded by Íñigo; Fernández de Velasco
Spanish nobility
Preceded by Íñigo; Fernández de Velasco	Duke of Frías; 1528–1559	Succeeded by Íñigo; Fernández de Velasco
