= John IV of Portugal =

King of Portugal from 1640 to 1656

John IV
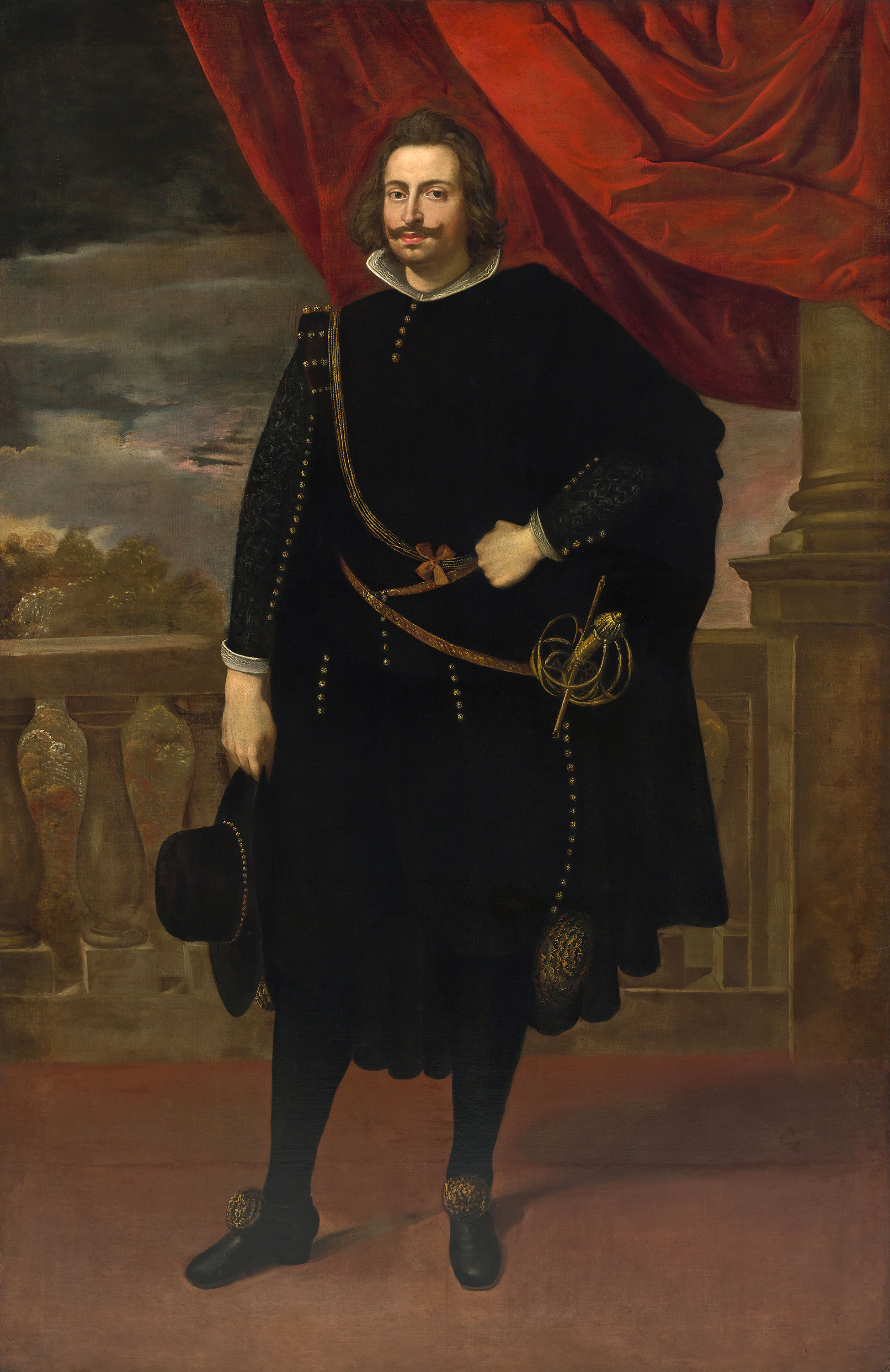
- Portrait, c. 1628

King of Portugal
- Reign: 1 December 1640 – 6 November 1656
- Coronation: 15 December 1640
- Predecessor: Philip III
- Successor: Afonso VI
- Born: 19 March 1604; Ducal Palace of Vila Viçosa, Vila Viçosa, Portugal
- Died: 6 November 1656 (aged 52); Ribeira Palace, Lisbon, Portugal
- Burial: Pantheon of the Braganzas
- Spouse: Luisa de Guzmán (m. 1633)
- Issue Detail: Teodósio, Prince of Brazil; Joana, Princess of Beira; Catherine, Queen Consort of England, Scotland, and Ireland; Afonso VI of Portugal; Peter II of Portugal
- Portuguese: João, o Restaurador
- House: Braganza
- Father: Teodósio II, Duke of Braganza
- Mother: Ana de Velasco y Girón

Dom John IV (19 March 1604 – 6 November 1656), was King of Portugal from 1640 until his death in 1656. The grandson of Catherine, Duchess of Braganza, a claimant to the crown during the Portuguese succession crisis of 1580, he was proclaimed king in 1640 following the outbreak of the Portuguese Restoration War.

This ended the 60-year-old Iberian Union with Spain, and put the House of Braganza on the Portuguese throne. By the time of his death in 1656, the Portuguese Empire had reached its maximum territorial extent.

== Early life ==
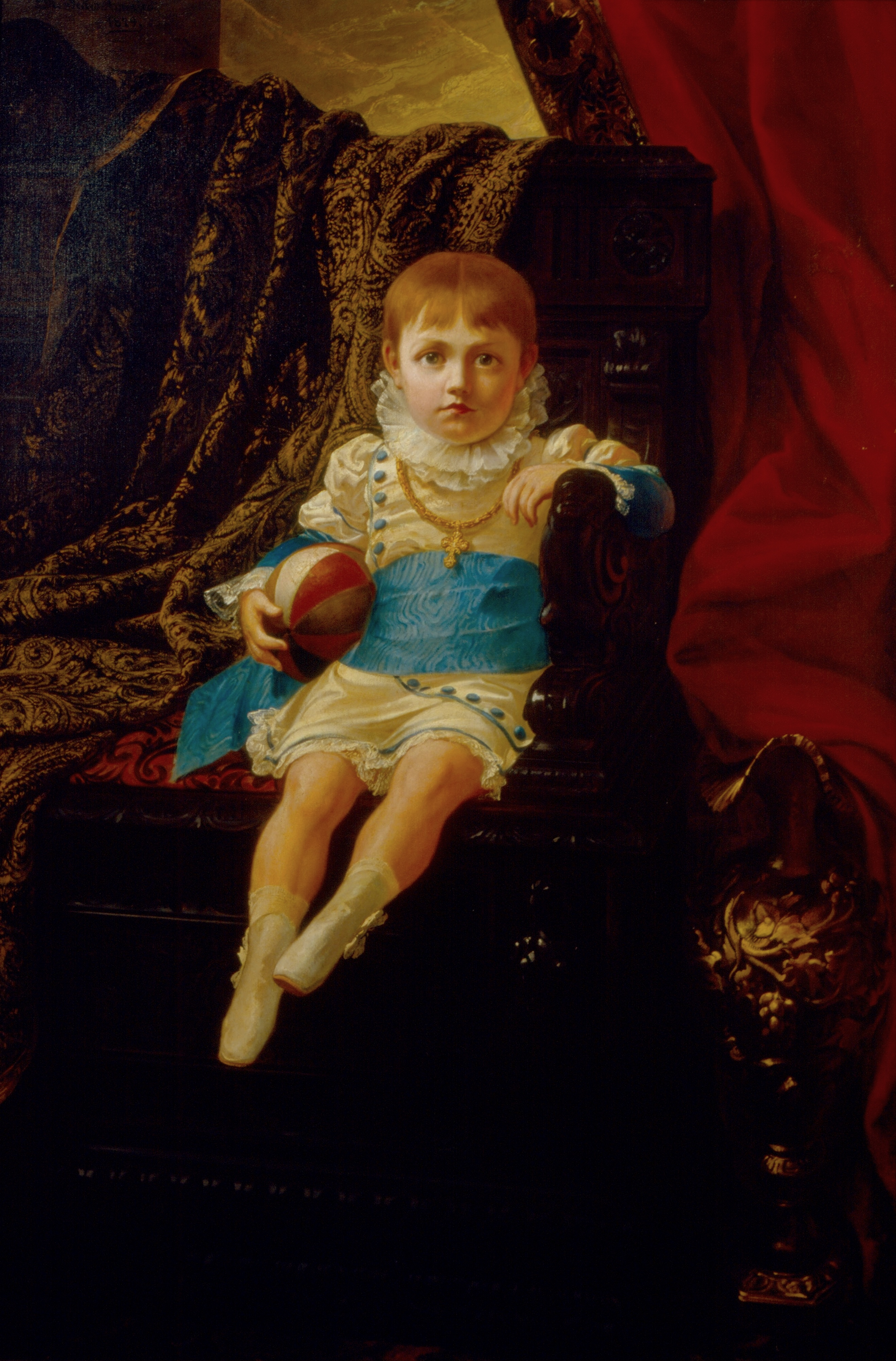
John as an infant; Pedro Américo, 1879.

John IV was born at Vila Viçosa and succeeded his father Teodósio II as Duke of Braganza when the latter died insane in 1630. He married Luisa de Guzmán (1613–66), the eldest daughter of Juan Manuel Pérez de Guzmán, 8th Duke of Medina Sidonia, in 1633. John was described as having blonde hair and an average height.

== Reign ==
=== Accession ===
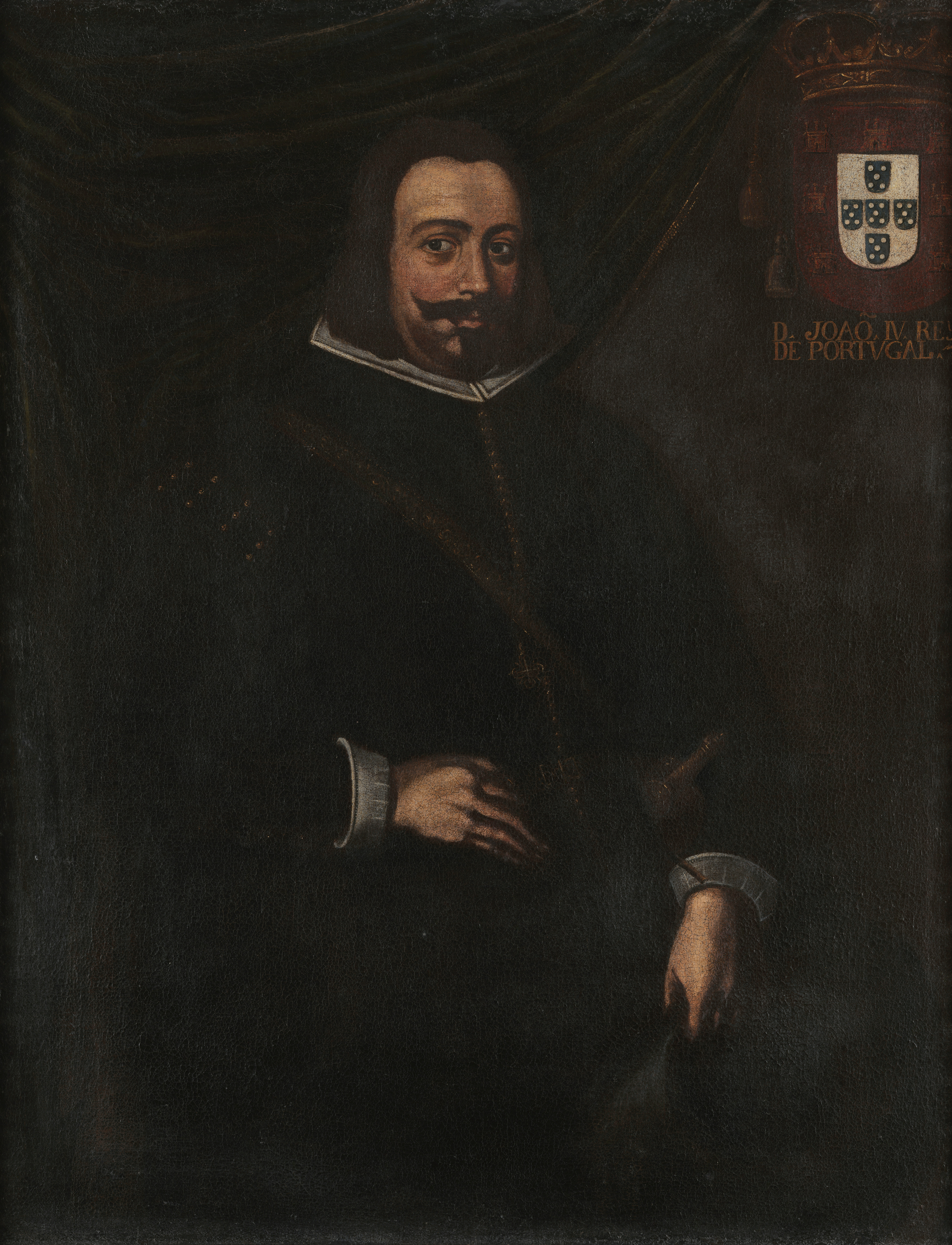
John as king of Portugal by José de Avelar Rebelo, c. 1640s.

When Philip II of Portugal (III of Spain) died, he was succeeded by his son Philip III (IV of Spain), who had a different approach to Portuguese issues. Taxes on the Portuguese merchants were raised, the Portuguese nobility began to lose its influence, and government posts in Portugal were increasingly occupied by Spaniards. Ultimately, Philip III tried to make Portugal a Spanish province, meaning Portuguese nobles stood to lose all of their power.

This situation culminated in a revolution organised by the nobility and the bourgeoisie, executed on 1 December 1640, sixty years after the accession of Philip II of Spain to the throne of Portugal. A plot was planned by several associates, known as the Forty Conspirators, who killed the Secretary of State, Miguel de Vasconcelos, and imprisoned the king's cousin, Margaret of Savoy, the Vicereine of Portugal, governing the country in the King's name. Philip III's troops were at the time fighting the Thirty Years' War and also dealing with a revolution in Catalonia, which severely hampered Spain's ability to quash the rebellion.

Within a matter of hours and with popular support, John, then the 8th Duke of Braganza, was acclaimed as King John IV of Portugal (as the legend goes, with the persuasion of his wife), claiming legitimate succession through his grandmother Catherine, Duchess of Braganza. The ensuing conflict with Spain brought Portugal into the Thirty Years' War as, at least, a peripheral player. From 1641 to 1668, the period during which the two nations were at war, Spain sought to isolate Portugal militarily and diplomatically, and Portugal tried to find the resources to maintain its independence through political alliances and maintenance of its colonial income.

=== Restoration War ===
His accession led to a protracted war with neighbouring Spain, a conflict known as the Portuguese Restoration War, which ended with the recognition of Portuguese independence in a subsequent reign (1668). Portugal signed lengthy alliances with France (1 June 1641) and Sweden (August 1641) but by necessity its only contributions in the Thirty Years' War were in the field against Spain and against Dutch encroachments on the Portuguese colonies.

The period from 1640 to 1668 was marked by periodic skirmishes between Portugal and Spain, as well as short episodes of more serious warfare, much of it occasioned by Spanish and Portuguese entanglements with non-Iberian powers. Spain was involved in the Thirty Years' War until 1648 and the Franco-Spanish War until 1659, while Portugal was involved in the Dutch–Portuguese War until 1663. In Spain, a Portuguese invasion force defeated the Spanish at Montijo, near Badajoz, in 1644.

=== Imperial Recovery ===
Abroad, the Dutch took Portuguese Malacca (January 1641), and the Imam of Oman captured Muscat (1650). Nevertheless, the Portuguese, despite having to divide their forces among Europe, Brazil, and Africa, managed to retake Luanda, in Portuguese Angola, from the Dutch in 1648 and, by 1654, had recovered northern Brazil, which effectively ceased to be a Dutch colony. This was countered by the loss of Portuguese Ceylon (present day Sri Lanka) to the Dutch, who took Colombo in 1656.

== Death and legacy ==
King John IV died in 1656 and was succeeded by his son Afonso VI. His daughter, Catherine of Braganza, married King Charles II of England. Bombay in India was given as dowry to the English.

John was a patron of music and the arts, and a considerably sophisticated writer on music; in addition to this, he was a composer. During his reign he collected one of the largest libraries in the world, but it was destroyed in the Lisbon earthquake of 1755. Among his writings are a defence of Palestrina, and a Defence of Modern Music (Lisbon, 1649). One famous composition attributed to him is a setting of the Crux fidelis, a work that remains highly popular during Holy Week amongst church choirs. However, no known manuscript of the work exists, and it was first published only in 1869, in France. On stylistic grounds, it is generally recognised that the work was written in the nineteenth century.

In 1646, John IV proclaimed Mary, in her conception as the Immaculate Conception (the 'Immaculata'), the Patroness of Portugal by royal decree of the House of Braganza. The doctrine had appeared in the Middle Ages and had been fiercely debated in the 15th and 16th centuries, but a bull issued in 1616 by Pope Paul V finally "[forbade] anyone to teach or preach a contrary opinion." Three years later, in 1649, the iconography of the Immaculata was established by Francisco Pacheco (1564–1654), a Spanish artistic advisor to the Inquisition, based on Revelation XII:1.

== Marriages and descendants ==
John married Luisa de Guzmán, daughter of Juan Manuel Pérez de Guzmán, 8th Duke of Medina-Sidonia. From that marriage, they had seven children. Because some of John's children were born and died before their father became king, they are not considered infantes or infantas (heirs to the throne) of Portugal.

Name	Birth	Death	Notes
By Luisa de Guzmán (13 October 1613 – 27 February 1666; married on 12 January 1633)
Infante Teodósio	8 February 1634	13 May 1653	Prince of Brazil and 9th Duke of Braganza. Died at the age of 19.
Ana de Bragança	21 January 1635	21 January 1635	Stillborn.
Infanta Joana (Joan)	18 September 1635	17 November 1653	Died at the age of 18.
Infanta Catherine (Catarina)	25 November 1638	31 December 1705	Commonly known as Catherine of Braganza. Queen consort through marriage to Charles II of England.
Manuel de Bragança	6 September 1640	6 September 1640	Stillborn.
Infante Afonso	21 August 1643	12 September 1683	Prince of Brazil and 10th Duke of Braganza. Succeeded him as Afonso VI, King of Portugal.
Infante Peter (Pedro)	26 April 1648	9 December 1706	Duke of Beja, Constable of the Kingdom, Lord of the Casa do Infantado and Regent of the Kingdom before succeeding his brother Afonso as Peter II, King of Portugal.
Illegitimate offspring
Maria de Bragança	30 April 1644	7 February 1693	Natural daughter.

== Ancestry ==
Ancestors of John IV of Portugal

8. Teodósio, 5th Duke of Braganza
4. João, 6th Duke of Braganza
9. Isabel of Lencastre
2. Teodósio, 7th Duke of Braganza
10. Edward, Duke of Guimarães
5. Catherine of Portugal
11. Isabel of Braganza
1. John IV of Portugal
12. Íñigo, 4th Duke of Frías
6. Juan, 5th Duke of Frías
13. Ana de Guzmán y Aragón
3. Ana de Velasco y Girón
14. Pedro, 1st Duke of Osuna
7. María Téllez-Girón y Guzmán
15. Leonor de Guzmán y Aragón

== Sources ==
- D.A. Brading (1993). The First America: The Spanish Monarchy, Creole Patriots and the Liberal State 1492–1866. Cambridge University Press. ISBN 978-0-521-44796-6.
- Sousa, António Caetano de. História genealógica da Casa Real portuguesa (in Portuguese). Vol. VII. Lisbon: Silviana.

John IV of Portugal House of Braganza Cadet branch of the House of Aviz Born: 19 March 1604 Died: 6 November 1656
Regnal titles
Preceded by Philip III	King of Portugal and the Algarves; 1640–1656	Succeeded by Afonso VI
Portuguese nobility
Preceded by Teodósio II	Duke of Barcelos; 1630–1640	Merged with the Crown
