= Ana de Velasco y Girón =

Spanish noblewoman (1585–1607)

Ana de Velasco y Téllez-Girón
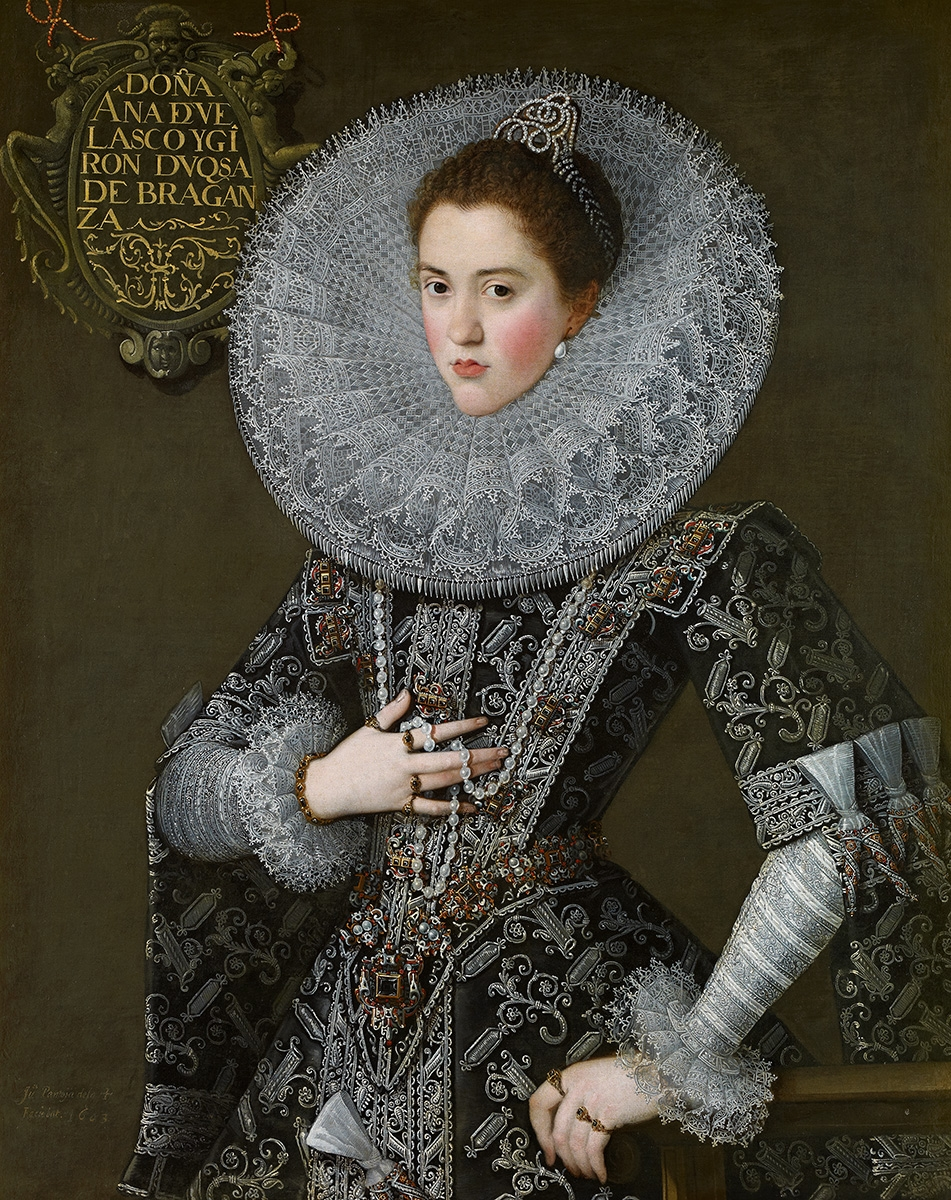
- Ana de Velasco y Téllez-Girón, in 1603
- Born: 12 March 1585; Naples, Italy
- Died: 7 November 1607 (aged 22); Vila Viçosa
- Spouse: Teodósio II, Duke of Braganza (m. 1603)
- Issue: John IV, King of Portugal; Edward, Lord of Vila do Conde; Catherine of Braganza; Alexandre of Braganza
- House: Frías
- Father: Juan Fernández de Velasco, 5th Duke of Frías
- Mother: Maria Tellez-Giron

The ducal coat of arms of the Andalusian dukes of Osuna, after the Portuguese Secession of 1640 from the Spanish Habsburg, reminding their linkage to the new Portuguese Royal House of Braganza – the first Braganza king, John IV of Portugal (1603–1656), was the son of Teodósio II, Duke of Braganza, (1568–1630) and Ana de Velasco y Girón, older daughter of Juan Fernández de Velasco, 5th Duke of Frías (1550–1634), and granddaughter of Pedro Téllez-Girón, 1st Duke of Osuna and Viceroy of Naples

Ana de Velasco y Téllez-Girón (12 March 1585 – 7 November 1607) was a Spanish noblewoman and mother of John IV of Portugal, the first Portuguese King of the Braganza Dynasty.

== Biography ==
She was the daughter of Juan Fernández de Velasco, 5th Duke of Frías and his wife, María Tellez-Girón, the daughter of Andalusian Duke of Osuna, Pedro Téllez-Girón, 1st Duke of Osuna.

== Marriage and issue ==
She married on 17 June 1603, Teodósio II, Duke of Braganza and had four children:

- John II, 8th Duke of Bragança (1604–1656), crowned King as John IV of Portugal on 1 December 1640;
- Edward of Braganza (1605–1649), Lord of Vila do Conde;
- Catherine of Braganza (1606–1610);
- Alexandre of Braganza (1607–1637);

== Death ==
She died in Vila Viçosa at the age of 22. Her body was buried in the Convento das Chagas, Vila Viçosa, Portugal.

== Ancestry ==
Ancestors of Ana de Velasco y Girón

8. Juan de Velasco y Tovar, 1st Marquis of Berlanga
4. Íñigo de Velasco y Girón, 4th Duke of Frías
9. María Girón y Guzmán
2. Juan de Velasco y Guzmán, 5th Duke of Frías
10. Juan Alonso de Guzmán y Zúñiga, 6th Duke of Medina Sidonia
5. Ana de Guzmán y Aragón
11. Ana de Aragón y Gurrea
1. Ana de Velasco y Girón
12. Juan Téllez-Girón y Velasco, 4th Count of Ureña
6. Pedro Téllez-Girón y la Cueva, 1st Duke of Osuna
13. María de la Cueva y Toledo
3. María Téllez-Girón y Guzmán
14. Juan Alonso de Guzmán y Zúñiga, 6th Duke of Medina Sidonia (= 10)
7. Leonor de Guzmán y Aragón
15. Ana de Aragón y Gurrea (= 11)
