= Pedro de Padilla =

Pedro de Padilla, (? in Talavera de la Reina – 1599 in Granada, Spain), a prominent member of the Military Order of Santiago after 1597, captain of the Infantry in Flanders and maestre de campo in Naples, Italy.

== Biography ==
During 1569–1571 he served under the command of John of Austria in the war against the moriscos in Granada, fighting also in the Battles of Lepanto and Navarino against the Ottoman Turks and operating in North Africa besieging places now located in Morocco and Algeria.

He had been involved previously in the military operations against the Portuguese Nobility in the 1580 succession crisis whereby king Philip II of Spain claimed his right to the Portuguese throne as his mother was a Portuguese Princess, becoming thus king Philip I of Portugal. Pedro was promoted afterwards to Governor of Oran and Mazalquivir (1585–1589) and was, during 1595, interim Governor of the Duchy of Milan to cover the absence of Juan Fernández de Velasco, Governor of the Duchy of Milan.

Government offices
| Preceded by Juan Fernández de Velasco (first term) | Governor of the Duchy of Milan; 1595–1595 | Succeeded by Juan Fernández de Velasco (second term) |
