= Pedro Fernández de Velasco, 2nd Count of Haro =

Spanish nobleman (c. 1425–1492)

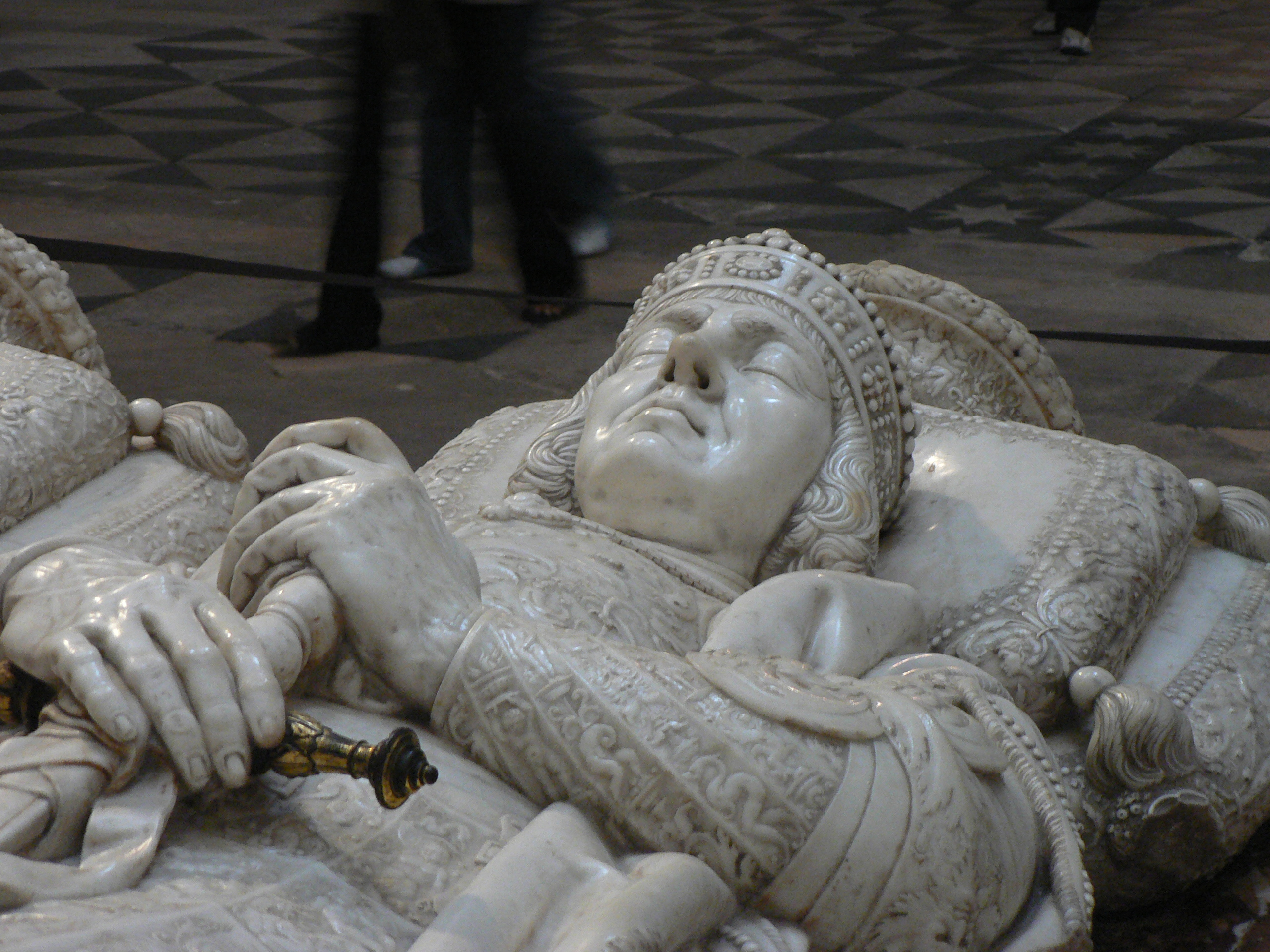
Detail of the "tomb of the Condestable" in the Burgos Cathedral.

Pedro Fernández de Velasco, 2nd Count of Haro (in full, Spanish: Don Pedro Fernández de Velasco y Manrique, segundo conde de Haro, sexto Condestable de Castilla, señor de los valles de Saba y Ruesga, y de las villas de Briviesca, Puebla de Arganzón, Arnedo, Medina de Pomar, Santo Domingo de Silos, Salas de los Infantes, Villalpando, señor de Haro, Belorado, Frías, Villasiego y Herrera, Camarero mayor de Enrique IV de Castilla y de los Reyes Católicos, Merino mayor de Castilla la Vieja, Virrey y capitán general del Reino de Navarra y de las Provincias Vascongadas) (c. 1425 – 1492) was a Spanish nobleman and military figure of the last stages of the Reconquista.

== Biography ==
Fernández de Velasco was born in Burgos, the son of Pedro Fernández de Velasco and of Beatriz Manrique. He became Camarero Mayor of King Henry IV of Castile, and viceroy and governor of Castile. In 1473 Henry IV named him sixth Constable of Castile and made this title hereditary in his family.

He participated in the conquest of Úbeda and Baeza, which both occurred on Saint Andrew's day. He also fought against the Moors in the battles of Gibraltar and Archidona and participated in the conquest of Granada, where he died. He and his wife are buried in the Capilla del Condestable in the Burgos Cathedral.

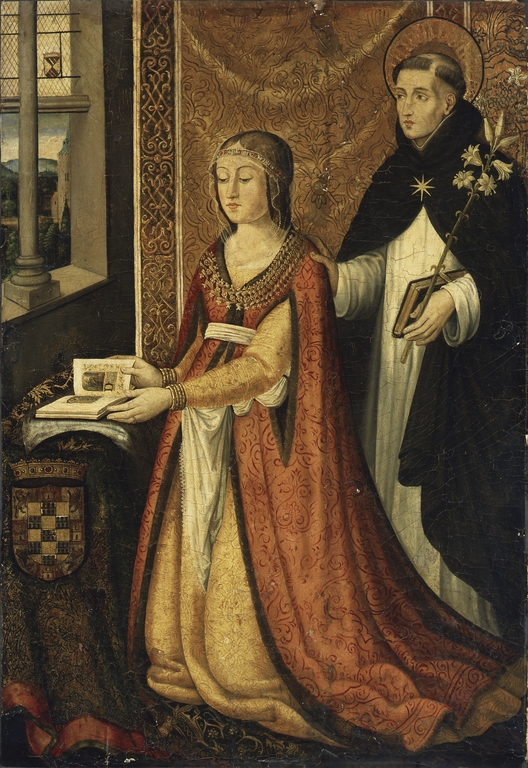
Mencía de Mendoza y Figueroa

He married Maria de Mendoza (1430-1470), daughter of Íñigo López de Mendoza, 1st Marquis of Santillana, with whom he had seven children :

- Bernardino Fernández de Velasco, 1st Duke of Frías (1454-1512), married
  - Blanca de Herrera, señora de Pedraza de la Sierra
  - Juana of Aragon, illegitimate daughter of Ferdinand II of Aragon.
- Íñigo Fernández de Velasco, 2nd Duke of Frías (1462-1528), married María de Tovar, Lady of Berlanga
- Catarina de Velasco (1450-1496), married Pedro de Zúñiga, 2nd Count of Miranda
- Leonor de Velasco (1453-1522), married Juan Téllez-Girón, 2nd Count of Ureña
- María de Velasco (1457-1493), married
  - Juan Pacheco, 1st Duke of Escalona
  - Beltrán de la Cueva, 1st Duke of Alburquerque
- Isabel Fernandez de Velasco (1465-1496), married Juan Alonso de Guzmán, 3rd Duke of Medina Sidonia
- Mencia de Velasco.

== Sources ==
- Castro Pereira Mouzinho de Albuquerque e Cunha, Fernando de (1995). Instrumentário Genealógico - Linhagens Milenárias (in Portuguese). pp. 329–30.
- Costa Felgueiras Gaio, Manuel José da. Nobiliário das Famílias de Portugal (in Portuguese). Vol. VII. Portugal: Beltroens.
- Hobbs, Nicolas (2007). "Grandes de España" (in Spanish). Archived from the original on November 29, 2006.
- Sousa, Dom António Caetano de (1946). História Genealógica da Casa Real Portuguesa (in Portuguese). Vol. VI (2ª Edição ed.). Coimbra, Portugal: Atlântida-Livraria Editora, Lda. p. 323.
- Instituto de Salazar y Castro. Elenco de Grandezas y Titulos Nobiliarios Españoles (in Spanish). periodic publication.
- "Genealogia" (in Portuguese). Archived from the original on March 12, 2007.

Military offices
Preceded by Miguel Lucas de Iranzo	Constable of Castile; 1473–1492	Succeeded by Bernardino; Fernández de Velasco
Spanish nobility
Preceded by Pedro; Fernández de Velasco	Count of Haro; 1470–1492	Succeeded by Bernardino; Fernández de Velasco
