= List of governors of the Duchy of Milan =

Governor of Milan Italian: Governatore di Milano

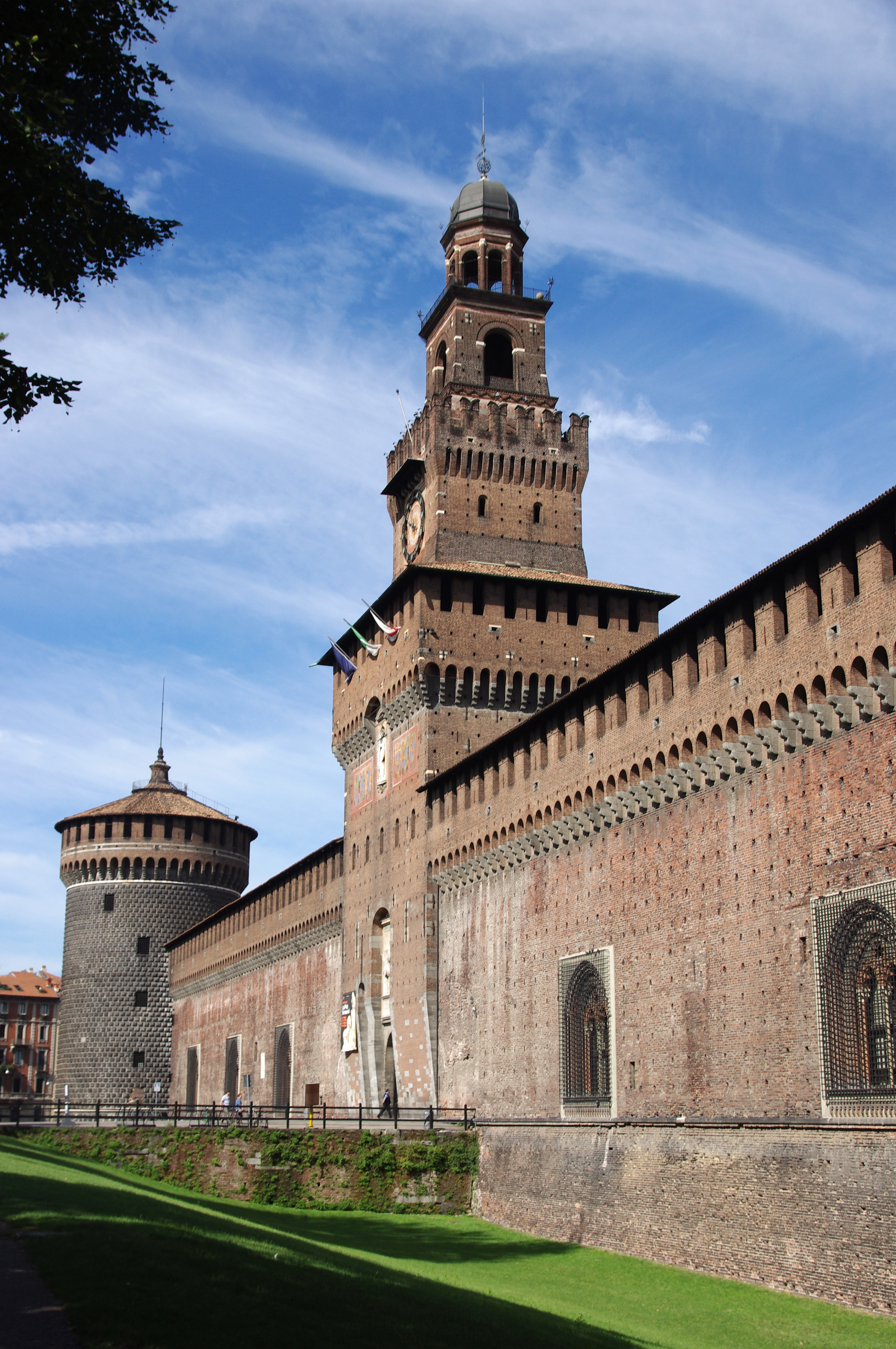
- Castello Sforzesco, seat of the governor.
- Residence: Castello Sforzesco
- Appointer: Council of Italy (1526–1706); Emperor of Austria (1726–1800)
- Formation: 6 July 1526
- First holder: Charles III
- Final holder: Luigi Cocastelli
- Abolished: 1800

The governor of Milan was a political and military office of the Duchy of Milan, the title of the representatives of the foreign sovereigns who held dominion over the Milanese area, substantially from the 16th century until the Unification of Italy. The first Spanish Governor was appointed after the death of the last Duke of the House of Sforza, Francesco II.

== Governors during the French period ==
The office of Governor, abolished during the earlier period of Visconti rule and later under the Sforza, was reinstated for the brief period of French regency/occupation of the Duchy of Milan between the late 15th century and the first half of the 16th century. In this period, governors primarily served as military commanders of the royal garrisons in Milan, resided in the Sforza Castle, and held the title of castellan.

=== Governors of the French period ===
From	To	Governor	Notes
1499	1500	Gian Giacomo Trivulzio, Marquis of Vigevano	
1500	1510	Charles II d'Amboise, Lord of Chaumont	
25 June 1511	11 April 1512	Gaston of Foix, Duke of Nemours	
1512	1515	Complete Sforza restoration (Duke Ercole Massimiliano Sforza)	
14 September 1515	March 1516	Charles III, Duke of Bourbon	
March 1516	1522	Odet de Foix, Viscount of Lautrec	In 1521 Francesco II Sforza was restored as Duke of Milan by imperial forces, but had to govern while constantly contending with the occupying forces of the King of France and imperial interference. He retained control with difficulty until his death in 1535.
15 September 1524	1525	Michele Antonio di Saluzzo	(see note above)
1525	24 February 1525	Teodoro Trivulzio	(see note above)

== Sforza's final years ==
The figure of the Governor of Milan had already been established in 1526, following the Battle of Pavia and the passage of the duchy from the Kingdom of France, which invaded the Duchy in 1499, to the Sforza, no more as an independent state as it was during the centuries old rule of the Milanese dynasties, but now under the protection of Charles V.

1. Charles III 1526–1527, died in office
2. Alessandro Bentivoglio 1531–1532, died in office

== Charles V ==
1. Antonio de Leyva, Prince of Ascoli 1535–1536, died in office
2. Cardinal Marino Caracciolo 1536–1538, civil, died in office
3. Alfonso d'Avalos d'Aquino, Marquis of Vasto 1538–1546, military
4. Ferdinando Gonzaga, Prince of Molfetta, Duke of Ariano 1546–1555
5. Fernando Álvarez de Toledo, 3rd Duke of Alba 1555–1556

== Spanish rule (1556–1706) ==
1. Cristoforo Madruzzo 1556–1557
2. Gonzalo II Fernández de Córdoba (1520–1578) 1558–1560, first term
3. Francesco Ferdinando II d'Ávalos 5th Marquis of Pescara 1560–1563
4. Gonzalo II Fernández de Córdoba (1520–1578) 1563–1564, second term
5. Gabriel de la Cueva, 5th Duke of Alburquerque 1564–1571, died in office
6. Álvaro de Sande 1571–1572
7. Luis de Zúñiga y Requesens 1572–1573
8. Antonio de Zúñiga y Sotomaior, 3rd Marquis of Ayamonte 1573–1580, died in office
9. Sancho de Guevara y Padilla 1580–1583
10. Carlo d'Aragona Tagliavia 1583–1592
11. Juan Fernández de Velasco, 5th Duke of Frías 1592–1595, first term
12. Don Pedro de Padilla 1595–1595
13. Juan Fernández de Velasco, 5th Duke of Frías 1595–1600, second term
14. Pedro Enríquez de Acevedo, Count of Fuentes 1600–1610, died in office
15. Juan Fernández de Velasco, 5th Duke of Frías 1610–1612, third term
16. Juan de Mendoza, Marquis de la Hinojosa 1612–1616
17. Pedro Álvarez de Toledo, 5th Marquis of Villafranca 1616–1618
18. Gómez Suárez de Figueroa, 3rd Duke of Feria 1618–1625, first term
19. Gonzalo Fernandez de Córdoba 1625–1629
20. Ambrogio Spinola, 1st Marquis of the Balbases 1629–1630, died in office
21. Álvaro de Bazán, 2nd Marquis of Santa Cruz 1630–1631
22. Gómez Suárez de Figueroa, 3rd Duke of Feria 1631–1633, second term
23. Ferdinand, the Cardinal–Infant 1633–1634
24. Cardinal Gil de Albornoz 1634–1635
25. Diego Felipez de Guzmán, Marquis of Leganés 1635–1636, first term
26. Fernando Afán de Ribera, duke of Alcalá de los Gazules 1636, died in office
27. Diego Felipez de Guzmán, Marquis of Leganés 1636–1641, second term
28. Juan de Velasco, Count of Siruela 1641–1643
29. Antonio Sancho Davila, Marquis of Velada 1643–1646
30. Bernardino Fernández de Velasco, 6th Duke of Frías 1646–1648
31. Luis de Benavides Carrillo, Marquis of Caracena 1648–1656
32. Cardinal Teodoro Trivulzio 1656–1656
33. Alfonso Pérez de Vivero, Count of Fuensaldaña 1656–1660
34. Francesco Caetani, 8th Duke of Sermoneta 1660–1662
35. Luis de Guzmán Ponce de Leon 1662–1668, died in office
36. Paolo Spinola, 3rd Marquis of the Balbases 1668–1668, first term
37. Francisco de Orozco, Marqués de Mortara 1668–1668
38. Paolo Spinola, 3rd Marquis of the Balbases 1669–1670, second term
39. Gaspar Téllez-Girón, 5th Duke de Osuna 1670–1674
40. Claude Lamoral, Prince of Ligne 1674–1678
41. Juan Henríquez de Cabrera, Count of Melgar 1678–1686
42. Antonio López de Ayala y Velasco, Count of Fuensalida 1686–1691
43. Diego Dávila Mesía y Guzmán, 3rd Marquis of Leganés 1691–1698
44. Prince Charles Henry de Lorraine-Vaudemont 1698–1706

Milan fell to the Austrian army on September 26, 1706 during the War of the Spanish Succession. The Austrian rule was confirmed by the Treaty of Rastatt.

== Austrian rule (1706–1800) ==
- Prince Eugene of Savoy 1706–1716
- Maximilian Karl Albert, Prince of Löwenstein-Wertheim-Rochefort 1717–1718, died in office
- Count Girolamo Colloredo 1719–1725
- Count Wirich Philipp von Daun 1725–1734
- Sardinian occupation 1734–1736
- Otto Ferdinand von Abensberg und Traun 1736–1743
- Johann Georg Christian, Prince of Lobkowicz 1743–1745
- Spanish occupation 1745–1746
- Gian Luca Pallavicini 1745–1747
- Ferdinand Bonaventura II von Harrach 1747–1750
- Gian Luca Pallavicini 1750–1754 (2nd term)
- Francis III, Duke of Modena 1754–1771, administrator of Austrian Lombardy
  - Archduke Peter Leopold of Austria 1754–1763, titular, became Grand Duke of Tuscany
  - Archduke Ferdinand of Austria 1763–1771, titular
- Archduke Ferdinand of Austria 1771–1796
- Transpadane Republic 1796–1797
- Cisalpine Republic 1797–1799
- Count Luigi Cocastelli 1799–1800

The Austrians abandoned Milan after the Battle of Marengo and the duchy was incorporated again in the Cisalpine Republic, which became the Italian Republic in 1802 and the Kingdom of Italy in 1805. In 1814 the Austrians retook Milan and, joined to the former Republic of Venice, it was formed into a new kingdom, the Kingdom of Lombardy–Venetia, ruled by Austrian-appointed viceroys.

== Sources ==
- GOBERNACIÓN DEL MILANESADO
- Storia de Milano (it)
