= Juan de Mendoza, Marquis de la Hinojosa =

Governor of the Duchy of Milan, Viceroy of Navarre, and Spanish Ambassador in England

Juan Hurtado de Mendoza y Velasco (died 24 or 26 February 1628) was a minister during the reign of Philip III, a position he attained due to his family's history. Among the roles he held throughout his career were: Marquis de la Hinojosa, Governor of the Duchy of Milan from 1612 through 1616, Viceroy of Navarre from 1620–1623, and Spanish Ambassador in England. A knight of the Military Order of Santiago, he was awarded the title of marquis de la Hinojosa by King Philip III of Spain, on 11 February 1612.

In 1609 he fought in Larache (now in Morocco) against North African troops, being one the Royal agents overseeing the forced migration in 1610 of the "moriscos" from the former Moorish kingdom of Granada, from the Moorish non-converted residents in the rest of Andalusia, including those of Hornachos in Extremadura.

During his career, Mendoza also became marquis of San Germán, Member of the Private Chambers of the king, Viceroy of Navarre, 1620–1623, Captain General of the Spanish Artillery and President of the "Consejo de Indias", a Royal Political Bureau dealing with all the administrative events related with the administration, trade and tax collections of the very extensive American Territories, in the North, Central, and South.

He decreed the establishment of the church at the Castrojeriz School (Spanish: Colegial de Castrojeriz). The scholars Marcus B. Burke, Peter Cherry called him "an important minister of the reign of Philip III". He died 24 February 1628. His wife was María de Velasco and his daughter was Ana María de Mendoza. The bodies of him, his wife, and his daughter were taken to a church at the Convento de Las Descalzas Reales, Valladolid on 25 February 1628 to be subsequently moved to the church at the Castrojeriz School.

Political offices
Preceded by Juan Fernández de Velasco, 5th Duke of Frías	Governor of the Duchy of Milan; 1612–1616	Succeeded by Pedro Álvarez de Toledo, 5th Marquis of Villafranca
Preceded by Felipe Ramírez de Arellano	Viceroy of Navarre; 1620–1623	Succeeded by Bernardino González de Avellaneda
