= Juan Sancho de Tovar y Velasco, 1st Marquis of Berlanga =

Spanish nobleman

Juan Sancho de Tovar, 1st Marquis of Berlanga
- Born: c. 1490
- Died: c. 1540
- Noble family: House of Frias
- Spouses: María Girón, Lady of Gandul and Marchenilla; Juana Enríquez
- Father: Íñigo Fernández de Velasco, 2nd Duke of Frías
- Mother: María de Tovar, Lady of Berlanga

Juan Sancho de Tovar, 1st Marquis of Berlanga (in full, Spanish: Don Juan Sancho de Tovar y Velasco, first marqués de Berlanga, señor de la Casa y Estado de Tovar) (c. 1490 – c. 1540) was a Spanish nobleman.

Tovar was the second son of Íñigo Fernández de Velasco, 2nd Duke of Frías and of María de Tovar, Lady of Berlanga. His original name was Juan Sancho Fernández de Velasco y Tovar, but he changed it and adopted his mother's last name in order to succeed to her titles, as Lord of Berlanga. On 10 April 1529, he was raised to Marquis of Berlanga by Charles V, Holy Roman Emperor. He married María Girón, Lady of Gandul and Marchenilla, with whom he had 8 children.

- Íñigo Fernández de Velasco, 4th Duke of Frías
- Francisco de Velasco y Tovar
- Pedro de Velasco y Tovar
- Juan de Velasco y Tovar
- Inés de Velasco y Tovar, who married Jerónimo de Acevedo, 4th Count of Monterrey
- Isabel de Velasco y Tovar, who married Antonio Gómez de Mendoza, 5th Count of Castrogeriz
- Juliana de Velasco y Tovar, nun
- Bernardina de Velasco y Tovar, nun

After the death of his first wife, he married Juana Enríquez, sister of Perafán de Ribera, 1st Duke of Alcalá. They had no issue. Tovar died in 1540.

== Sources ==
- Castro Pereira Mouzinho de Albuquerque e Cunha, Fernando de (1995). Instrumentário Genealógico — Linhagens Milenárias (in Portuguese). pp. 329–30.
- Costa Felgueiras Gaio, Manuel José da. Nobiliário das Famílias de Portugal (in Portuguese). Vol. VII. Portugal: Beltroens.
- Hobbs, Nicolas (2007). "Grandes de España" (in Spanish).
- Sousa, Dom António Caetano de (1946). História Genealógica da Casa Real Portuguesa (in Portuguese). Vol. VI (2ª Edição ed.). Coimbra, Portugal: Atlântida-Livraria Editora, Lda. p. 323.
- Instituto de Salazar y Castro. Elenco de Grandezas y Titulos Nobiliarios Españoles (in Spanish). periodic publication.

== Bibliography ==
- Juan Sancho de Tobar y Velasco, Family Tree

Juan Sancho de Tovar y Velasco, 1st Marquis of Berlanga House of Frias Born: c. 1490 Died: c. 1540
Spanish nobility
New title	Marquis of Berlanga; 1529–1540	Succeeded by Íñigo; Fernández de Velasco
