= Constable of Castile =

Spanish noble title

Constable of Castile (Spanish: Condestable de Castilla) was a title of a military nature created by John I, King of Castile in 1382, as a result of the Third Fernandine War against the Portuguese and the English.

The post substituted the title of Alférez Mayor del Reino and was more consistent with that of the French Constable of France. The constable was the second person in power in the kingdom, after the King and had supreme authority over the Army, as well as broad jurisdictional powers.

In 1473, Henry IV of Castile made the title hereditary for the Velasco family and the dukes of Frías. By that time, the position lacked any substance, and therefore it was decided that the title would lose all military or administrative functions, becoming a purely honorific distinction.

== List of constables of Castile ==
- 1382–1391: Alfonso of Aragon and Foix
- 1393–1400: Pedro Enrique de Trastámara, son of Fadrique Alfonso of Castile
- 1400–1423: Ruy López Dávalos
- 1423–1453: Álvaro de Luna
- 1458–1473: Miguel Lucas de Iranzo

=== Hereditary ceremonial title ===
- 1473–1492: Pedro Fernández de Velasco, 2nd Count of Haro
- 1492–1512: Bernardino Fernández de Velasco, 1st Duke of Frías
- 1512–1528: Íñigo Fernández de Velasco, 2nd Duke of Frías
- 1528–1559: Pedro Fernández de Velasco, 3rd Duke of Frías
- 1559–1585: Íñigo Fernández de Velasco, 4th Duke of Frías
- 1585–1615: Juan Fernández de Velasco, 5th Duke of Frías
- 1615–1652: Bernardino Fernández de Velasco, 6th Duke of Frías
- 1652–1696: Íñigo Melchor de Velasco, 7th Duke of Frías
- 1696–1713: José Fernández de Velasco y Tovar, 8th Duke of Frías

== Sources ==
Portal de Archivos Españoles
