= Bernardino Fernández de Velasco, 1st Duke of Frías =

Spanish nobleman

Don Bernardino Fernández de Velasco, 1st Duke of Frías, 3rd Count of Haro, Grandee of Spain (c. 1450 – 9 February 1512) was a Spanish nobleman and prominent military figure of the last stages of the Reconquista.

== Biography ==
Fernández de Velasco was born in Burgos, the son of Don Pedro Fernández de Velasco, 2nd Count of Haro, Constable of Castille, and of Doña Mencía de Mendoza y Figueroa, herself a daughter of the illustrious Marquis of Santillana.

He participated in the conquest of Granada, where his father died, and became one of its firsts Viceroys. On 20 March 1492 he was granted the title of Duke of Frías by the Catholic Monarchs. In 1497 they appointed him Captain General of Navarre, the Province of Gipuzkoa, and the Lordship of Biscay, at a time when the monarchs feared an invasion of the northern Iberian Peninsula by Charles VIII of France. They granted him full civil and military powers throughout that territory

=== Marriage and children ===
He first married Doña Blanca de Herrera, Lady of Pedraza de la Sierra, with whom he had a daughter, Ana Herrera de Velasco, who married Alonso Pimentel y Pacheco, 2nd Count-Duke of Benavente.

After becoming a widower in 1499, he married secondly Doña Juana de Aragón (c. 1469-1510), Lady of Castilnovo, an illegitimate daughter of King Ferdinand II of Aragon, with whom he had another daughter, Doña Juliana de Velasco y Aragón (1509-1557), 1st Countess of Castilnovo, who married her cousin Pedro Fernández de Velasco, 3rd Duke of Frías.

He also had five illegitimate sons from three mistresses.

When Bernardino Fernández de Velasco died in 1512, he had no legitimate male issue, so his titles passed on to his younger brother Don Íñigo Fernández de Velasco, 2nd Duke of Frías.

== Sources ==
- Castro Pereira Mouzinho de Albuquerque e Cunha, Fernando de (1995). Instrumentário Genealógico - Linhagens Milenárias (in Portuguese). pp. 329–30.
- Costa Felgueiras Gaio, Manuel José da. Nobiliário das Famílias de Portugal (in Portuguese). Vol. VII. Portugal: Beltroens.
- Sousa, Dom António Caetano de (1946). História Genealógica da Casa Real Portuguesa (in Portuguese). Vol. VI (2ª Edição ed.). Coimbra, Portugal: Atlântida-Livraria Editora, Lda. p. 323.
- Instituto de Salazar y Castro. Elenco de Grandezas y Titulos Nobiliarios Españoles (in Spanish). periodic publication.

Military offices
Preceded by Pedro; Fernández de Velasco	Constable of Castile; 1492–1512	Succeeded by Íñigo; Fernández de Velasco
Spanish nobility
New title	Duke of Frías; 1492–1512	Succeeded by Íñigo; Fernández de Velasco
Preceded by Pedro; Fernández de Velasco	Count of Haro; 1492–1512	Succeeded by Íñigo; Fernández de Velasco
