= Íñigo Fernández de Velasco, 2nd Duke of Frías =

Spanish nobleman

- Born: 1462
- Died: 17 September 1528
- Noble family: House of Frias
- Spouses: María de Tovar, Lady of Berlanga
- Father: Pedro Fernández de Velasco
- Mother: Mencía de Mendoza y Figueroa

Íñigo Fernández de Velasco (1462–17 September 1528), 2nd Duke of Frías, Grandee of Spain, and Constable of Castile (Spanish: Don Íñigo Fernández de Velasco y López de Mendoza, segundo duque de la villa de Frías, cuarto conde de Haro, octavo Condestable de Castilla, mayorazgo y señor de la Casa de Velasco, Caballero del Toisón de Oro), was a Spanish nobleman.

Fernández de Velasco was the son of Pedro Fernández de Velasco and Mencía de Mendoza. He inherited the titles from his older brother Bernardino, who had no legitimate male issue. He married María de Tovar, Lady of Berlanga, with whom he had six children.

- Pedro Fernández de Velasco, 3rd Duke of Frías
- Juan Sancho de Tovar, 1st Marquis of Berlanga
- Mencía de Velasco
- María de Velasco, nun
- Isabel de Velasco
- Juana de Velasco; married to Francisco Tomás de Borja y Centelles
  - Íñigo de Borja; married to Hélène de Bossu.

He took part in the Revolt of the Comuneros, leading the royalist army to crushing victory at the Battle of Villalar.

== Sources ==
- Castro Pereira Mouzinho de Albuquerque e Cunha, Fernando de (1995). Instrumentário Genealógico - Linhagens Milenárias (in Portuguese). pp. 329–30.
- Costa Felgueiras Gaio, Manuel José da. Nobiliário das Famílias de Portugal (in Portuguese). Vol. VII. Portugal: Beltroens.
- Hobbs, Nicolas (2007). "Grandes de España" (in Spanish).
- Sousa, Dom António Caetano de (1946). História Genealógica da Casa Real Portuguesa (in Portuguese). Vol. VI (2ª Edição ed.). Coimbra, Portugal: Atlântida-Livraria Editora, Lda. p. 323.
- Instituto de Salazar y Castro. Elenco de Grandezas y Titulos Nobiliarios Españoles (in Spanish). periodic publication.

Íñigo Fernández de Velasco, 2nd Duke of Frías House of Velasco Born: 1462 Died: 17 September 1528
Military offices
Preceded by Bernardino; Fernández de Velasco	Constable of Castile; 1512–1528	Succeeded by Pedro; Fernández de Velasco
Spanish nobility
Preceded by Bernardino; Fernández de Velasco	Duke of Frías; 1512–1528	Succeeded by Pedro; Fernández de Velasco
