= Juan Fernández de Velasco y Tovar, 5th Duke of Frías =

Spanish nobleman and diplomat

Juan Fernández de Velasco, 5th Duke of Frías
- Tovar in The Somerset House Conference, 1604
- Born: c. 1550
- Died: 15 March 1613; Madrid
- Noble family: House of Velasco
- Spouse: María Girón de Guzmán
- Father: Íñigo Fernández de Velasco, 4th Duke of Frías
- Mother: María Ángela de Aragón y Guzmán El Bueno

Juan Fernández de Velasco, 5th Duke of Frías (c. 1550 – 15 March 1613) was a Spanish nobleman and diplomat.

== Biography ==
Juan Fernández de Velasco was the son of Íñigo Fernández de Velasco; and of Maria Angela de Aragón y Guzmán El Bueno. He inherited his father's title of Constable of Castile, and was present at the signing of the Treaty of London (1604). Although he was not present for much of the negotiations, he was depicted in the Somerset House Conference group portrait now held at the National Portrait Gallery, London.

== London in 1604 ==
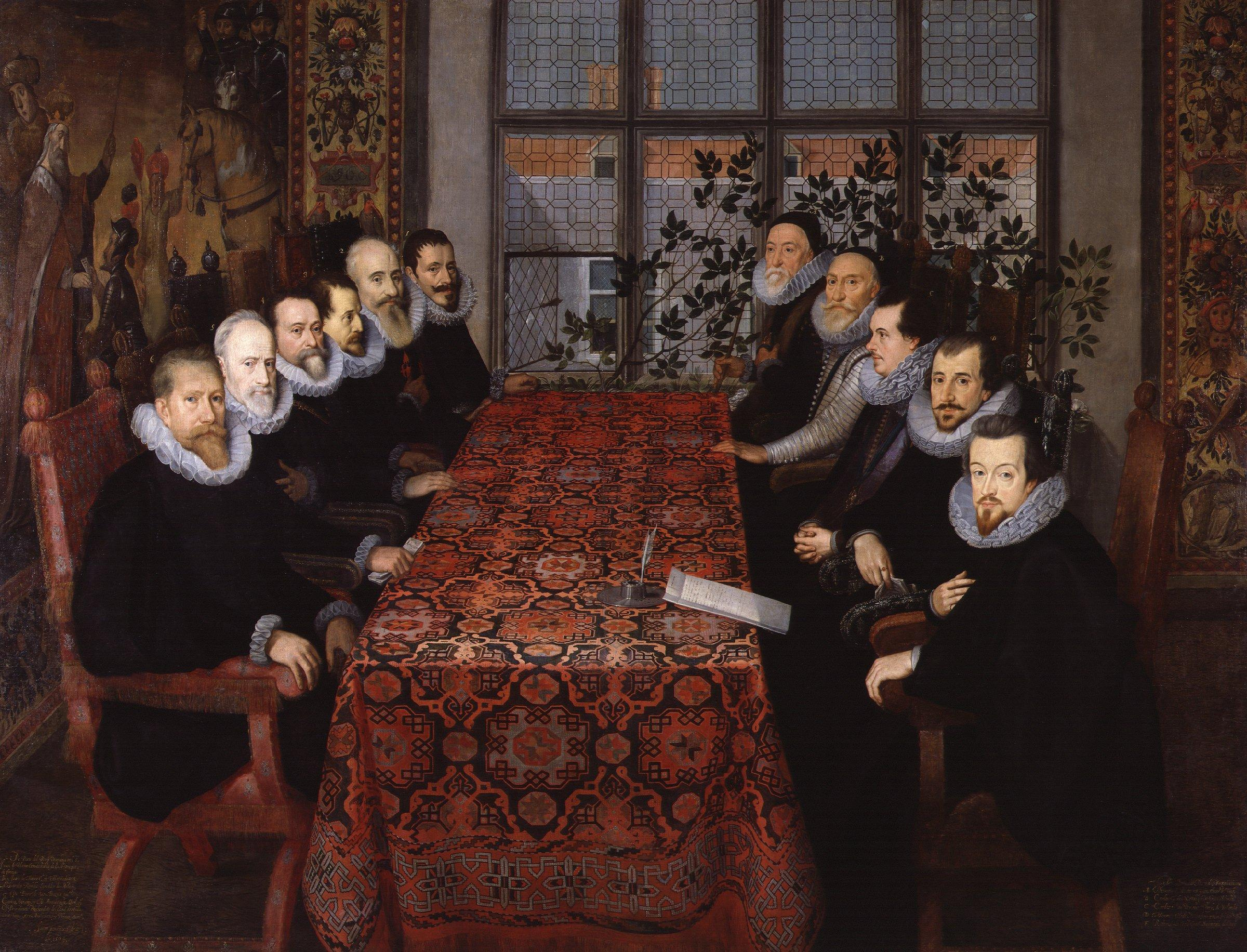
The Somerset House Conference, 1604, Delegates from Spain and the Spanish Netherlands on the left, the English on the right. The Duke of Frías sits at the open window. National Portrait Gallery, London.

He was sent to London to sign the recently negotiated peace treaty. The resident Spanish ambassador, the Count of Villamediana, asked King James if Velasco could be lodged at Somerset House, and Anne of Denmark granted his request. The lodging was decorated with royal tapestries, and his bedchamber furnished with a bed of "morado damask" bordered with gold. The furnishings were intended to be as rich as if the King of Spain, Philip III, had come in person.

The Count of Arenberg, in London as the diplomatic representative of the Spanish Netherlands, visited Theobalds and Wanstead House. The Archduke of Austria's commissioners were lodged at Durham House on the Strand, then in the possession of Tobias Matthew, Bishop of Durham. Actors of the Queen's Company including Thomas Greene were paid to attend the commissioners at Durham House for 18 days as "groomes of the Chamber", while Augustine Phillips and John Heminges and their King's Men fellows served at Somerset House. The actors, possibly including William Shakespeare (who had been given red cloth for the Royal Entry in March 1604), may have employed simply as extra hired help in magnificent households appointed for the ambassadors, and were not necessarily the recipients of special royal favour.

=== Arrival ===
The Constable's arrival in England was delayed, said to be because of ill health. In May, the Venetian diplomat Nicolò Molin heard the delay annoyed King James who felt he was being slighted. The negotiations, held at Somerset House, proceeded without him. Villamediana was allowed to use the lodgings in Somerset House that had been allocated to the Constable, and some rooms were allocated to the English delegation.

The Constable arrived at the Downs near Dover on 5 August. Lewis Lewkenor looked after his luggage which included ice for his wine. He was met at Barham Down on 7 August by 600 horsemen led by Lord Wotton. The riders were so well equipped that they might have been mistaken by the Spanish party for aristocratic courtiers. He reached London on 10 August 1604. King James was away hunting, based at Royston, Apethorpe, and Hinchingbrooke. He was at Drayton House on 10 August. James sent Lord Erskine of Dirleton from Bletsoe to meet the Constable. James had absented himself deliberately, the date of the Constable's arrival had been known three weeks in advance. James wrote to Cecil that he would hunt in the season and "I doubt if the Constable of Castille hath any power in his commission to stay the course of the sun". Robert Sidney, the Queen's chamberlain, thought that James would await the Constable's arrival at Theobalds. In his letters to his wife Barbara, Sidney was unable to track of the planned movements of the English royal households.

The Constable came to Somerset House on a barge on the Thames, in some ceremony. His arrival was managed by the Earl of Northampton, and watched by spectators in boats and barges near the Tower of London, including Anne of Denmark, the Countess of Suffolk, the Earl of Nottingham, and Robert Cecil. The queen and her companions wore black masks and their barge was disguised, without royal insignia.

=== Ceremonies ===
The Constable saw King James on 15 or 16 August and he had an audience with Anne of Denmark three days later at Whitehall Palace. He watched Prince Henry dance and exercise with a pike in the garden. He gave the prince a pony. Prince Henry danced for the guests. The Constable gave Prince Henry a Spanish horse with a rich saddle and bridle and an embroidered doublet with a sash.

The Constable discussed the points of the treaty in two meetings with the English commissioners. He initially disagreed over a detail concerning duties paid by English merchants carrying German goods into Spain. He conceded this point on 17 August, and the treaty was signed in the chapel at Whitehall Palace on 18 August. The date of the signatures in Foedera is 18 August (Old Style) and 28 August (New Style). A concluding ceremony was held in the chapel of Whitehall Palace on Sunday 19 August.

After the treaty was concluded, there was a banquet at Whitehall. The Elizabethan Banqueting House had been redecorated with sky and clouds painted by Leonard Fryer. The Constable gave Anne of Denmark a cup of crystal garnished with gold, shaped like a dragon. King James claimed that melon and oranges, which he shared as desert with the Constable, were Spanish fruits transplanted in English soil, a symbol of new international friendship. King James declared his daughter Elizabeth would prove less hostile than Elizabeth I to Spain, hinting at a dynastic marriage. From the windows, the party watched greyhounds and mastiffs fight bears.

=== Last days in England ===
After the banquet, the Constable was confined to his bed for a couple of days with lumbago, or, according to Nicolò Molin, an "attack of the kidneys", and the Count of Arenberg was laid up with gout. Due to the Duke's indisposition, King James came to Somerset House for the traditional leave taking, and gave him a diamond ring (supplied by Martin van Somer) as a token of the peace treaty as a marriage.

Amongst other visitors at his bedside, the Jesuit Henry Garnet attended in the company of Caraffa, the Constable's Spanish confessor. Philip III had hoped that the Constable would negotiate for the toleration and free exercise of religion for Catholics in James's realms, but he preferred to concentrate only on concluding the peace. He wrote a report on religion in England for Philip III in November, noting James's distaste for Puritanism.

As a parting gift, King James sent the Duke of Frías a service of vintage gilt plate, extracted from the Jewel House by Edward and Henry Cary. Anne of Denmark sent her vice-chamberlain George Carew to the Constable with her gifts of a jewelled locket with miniature portraits, supplied by John Spilman for £1000, and a collar or necklace (garganto) set with pearls (supplied by Peter Vanlore) for his wife. She sent the Count of Arenberg a jewel with her initials, "A.R".

The Constable recovered, and visited Rochester and the Medway forts. He left England from Dover for Gravelines. Details of embassy and its reception are known from letters of the Earl of Northampton, and the Spanish Relación de la Jornada del Condestable de Castilla published in Antwerp in 1604, and in Lima in 1605. A verse narrative, the Relacion de la pazes que se han confirmado en la cuidad de Londres, authored by Juan de Lelesma, printed in Málaga in 1605 gives a different perspective of the events and offers some information about the treaty.

The Constable gave gifts of jewels and money to courtiers and officials, and the Queen's ladies including Jane Drummond. Arbella Stuart received a set of 72 gold buttons, each set with three diamonds. The recipients were chosen by the Count of Villamediana. Most of the jewels were bought in Brussels, though a London-based goldsmith Arnold Lulls supplied at least one piece.

Totalling up what he heard of the costs of the gifts to all the diplomats, John Chamberlain observed, "We cannot say the King hath been behind hand with his liberality, for at this one instant he hath given away more plate than Q: Elizabeth did in her whole reign".

The pearl collar given by Anne of Denmark was kept by the Dukes of Frías into the 19th century. The plate given to the Constable included the French medieval royal gold cup and two Tudor water pots with spouts like dragons, attributed to Cornelis Hayes. Replacement pots were made by the goldsmiths John Williams and William Jefferies, and added to a cupboard of royal silver which was acquired by the Muscovy Company and given to Michael of Russia in 1629.

=== Governor of Milan ===
Juan Fernández de Velasco was Governor of the Duchy of Milan in the period 1592–1600 and 1610–1612. In 1595, he led the Spanish forces in the Battle of Fontaine-Française against the French, where he let victory slip through his fingers, due to excessive caution.

Between 1600 and 1612, he was also president of the Council of Italy.

== Works ==
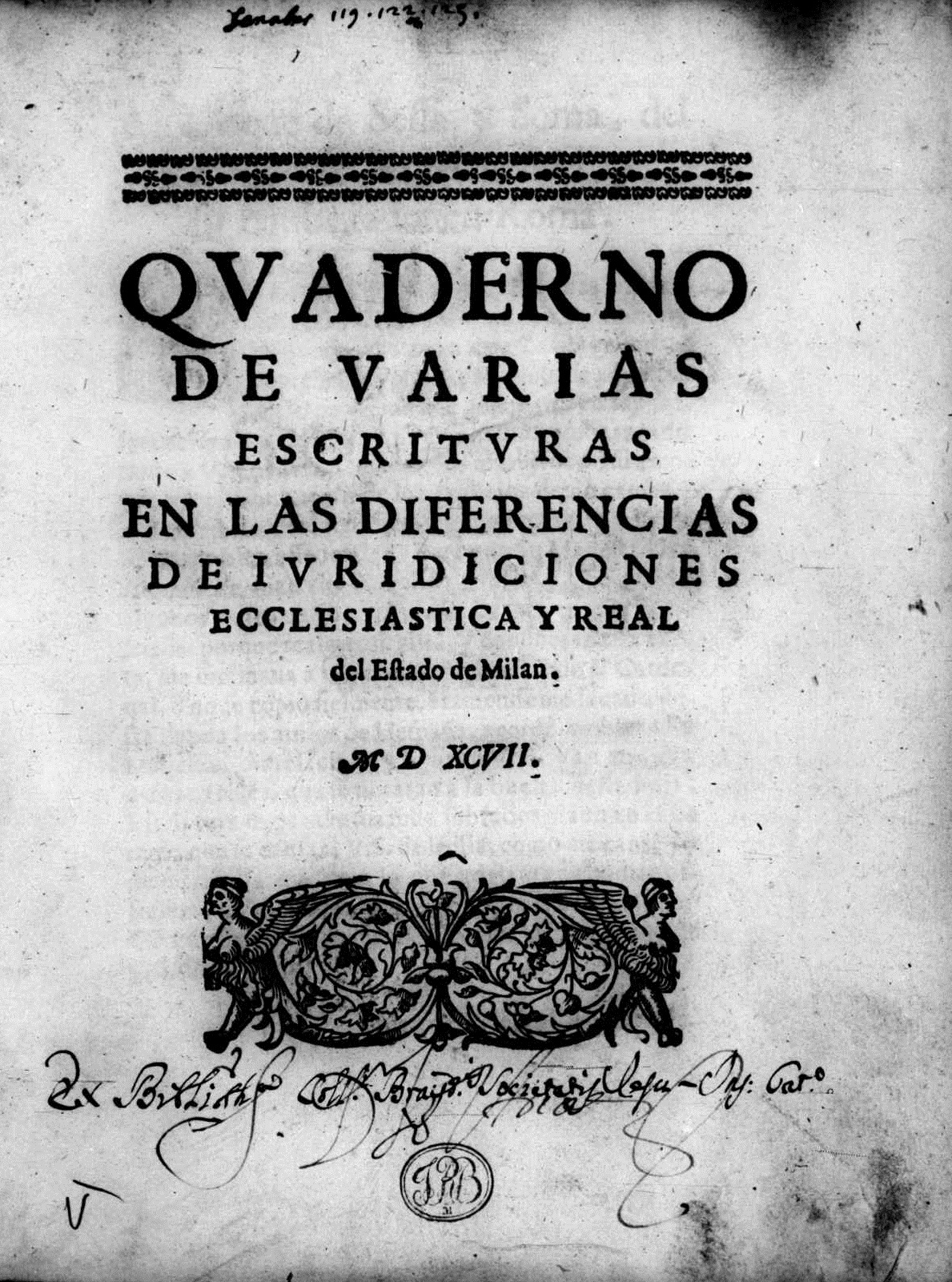
Quaderno de varias escrituras en las diferencias de iuridiciones ecclesiastica y real del estado de Milan, 1597

- Quaderno de varias escrituras en las diferencias de iuridiciones ecclesiastica y real del estado de Milan (in Spanish). Milano: Georg Herolt. 1597.

== Descendants ==
Around 1580, the Duke married María Girón de Guzmán, eldest daughter of Pedro Girón de la Cueva, 1st Duke of Osuna. Together they had a son and a daughter. The daughter, Ana de Velasco y Girón in turn married Teodósio II, Duke of Braganza and in 1604 gave birth to João, 8th Duke of Bragança, who was crowned King João IV of Portugal on 1 December 1640. In 1608, after the death of his first wife, Juan Fernández de Velasco married Joana de Córdoba y Aragón, and together they had three children:

By María Girón de Guzmán:

- Íñigo Fernández de Velasco, 9th Count of Haro
- Ana de Velasco y Girón, married Teodósio II, Duke of Braganza being the mother of King John IV of Portugal

By Joana de Córdoba y Aragón:

- Bernardino Fernández de Velasco, 6th Duke of Frías, married Isabel Maria de Guzmán
- Luis de Velasco, 1st Marquis del Fresno, married Catarina de Velasco
- Mariana Fernandez de Velasco, deceased 1650, married António II Alvarez de Toledo, 7th Duke of Alba, 4th Duke of Huéscar, a Knight of the Order of the Golden Fleece since 1675, (1615–1690).

== Sources ==
- Castro Pereira Mouzinho de Albuquerque e Cunha, Fernando de (1995). Instrumentário Genealógico – Linhagens Milenárias (in Portuguese). pp. 329–30.
- Hobbs, Nicolas (2007). "Grandes de España" (in Spanish).
- Instituto de Salazar y Castro. Elenco de Grandezas y Titulos Nobiliarios Españoles (in Spanish). periodic publication.
- "Genealogia" (in Portuguese). Archived from the original on March 11, 2007.

Government offices
Preceded by Carlo d'Aragona Tagliavia	Governor of the Duchy of Milan; 1592–1595	Succeeded by Pedro de Padilla
Preceded by Pedro de Padilla	Governor of the Duchy of Milan; 1595–1600	Succeeded by Pedro Henriquez de Acevedo, Count of Fuentes
Preceded by Pedro Henriquez de Acevedo, Count of Fuentes	Governor of the Duchy of Milan; 1610–1612	Succeeded by Juan de Mendoza, Marquis de la Hinojosa
Honorary titles
Preceded by Íñigo Fernández de Velasco, 4th Duke of Frías	Constable of Castile; 1585–1613	Succeeded by Bernardino Fernández de Velasco, 6th Duke of Frías
Spanish nobility
Preceded by Íñigo Fernández de Velasco, 4th Duke of Frías	Duke of Frías; 1585–1613	Succeeded by Bernardino Fernández de Velasco, 6th Duke of Frías
Preceded by Íñigo Fernández de Velasco, 4th Duke of Frías	Count of Haro; 1575–1580	Succeeded by Íñigo Fernández de Velasco, 9th Count of Haro
