= Íñigo Fernández de Velasco y Girón, 4th Duke of Frías =

Spanish nobleman

Íñigo Fernández de Velasco, 4th Duke of Frías
- Born: c. 1520
- Died: 1585
- Noble family: House of Velasco
- Spouse: Ana Pérez de Guzmán y Aragón
- Father: Juan Sancho de Tovar, 1st Marquis of Berlanga
- Mother: María Girón, Lady of Gandul and Marchenilla

Íñigo Fernández de Velasco, 4th Duke of Frías, Grandee of Spain, (in full, Spanish: Don Íñigo Fernández de Velasco y Girón, cuarto duque de Frías, segundo marqués de Berlanga, sexto conde de Haro, segundo conde de Castilnovo, Condestable de Castilla, mayorazgo y señor de la Casa de Velasco, señor de la Casa y Estado de Tovar, Camarero mayor de Felipe II), (c. 1520 – 1585), was a Spanish nobleman.

Fernández de Velasco was the son of Juan Sancho de Tovar, 1st Marquis of Berlanga and of María Girón, Lady of Gandul and Marchenilla. His original name was Íñigo de Tovar y Velasco, but he changed it and re-adopted his father's original last name when he inherited the Dukedom of Frías from his uncle Pedro Fernández de Velasco, who had no issue. He married Ana Pérez de Guzmán y Aragón, daughter of Juan Alfonso Pérez de Guzmán, 6th Duke of Medina Sidonia, with whom he had eleven children, among whom Juan Fernández de Velasco, 5th Duke of Frías.

== Sources ==
- Castro Pereira Mouzinho de Albuquerque e Cunha, Fernando de (1995). Instrumentário Genealógico - Linhagens Milenárias (in Portuguese). pp. 329–30.
- Costa Felgueiras Gaio, Manuel José da. Nobiliário das Famílias de Portugal (in Portuguese). Vol. VII. Portugal: Beltroens.
- Hobbs, Nicolas (2007). "Grandes de España" (in Spanish).
- Sousa, Dom António Caetano de (1946). História Genealógica da Casa Real Portuguesa (in Portuguese). Vol. VI (2ª Edição ed.). Coimbra, Portugal: Atlântida-Livraria Editora, Lda. p. 323.
- Instituto de Salazar y Castro. Elenco de Grandezas y Titulos Nobiliarios Españoles (in Spanish). periodic publication.

Íñigo Fernández de Velasco y Girón, 4th Duke of Frías House of Velasco Born: c. 1520 Died: 1585
Military offices
| Preceded by Pedro; Fernández de Velasco | Constable of Castile; 1559–1585 | Succeeded by Juan; Fernández de Velasco |
Spanish nobility
| Preceded by Pedro; Fernández de Velasco | Duke of Frías; 1559–1585 | Succeeded by Juan; Fernández de Velasco |
| Preceded by Juan Sancho de Tovar | Marquis of Berlanga; 1540–1585 | Succeeded by Juan; Fernández de Velasco |
| Preceded by Juliana de Velasco | Count of Castilnovo; 1540–1585 | Succeeded by Juan; Fernández de Velasco |
