= Brianda Pereira =

- Born: 1550; Angra do Heroísmo
- Died: 1620 (aged 69–70)
- Resting place: Angra do Heroísmo
- Citizenship: Kingdom of Portugal
- Era: 15th century
- Known for: Battle of Salga
- Spouse: Bartolomeu Lourenço
- Parents: Álvaro Anes de Alenquer (father); Maria Pereira de Sousa (mother)

Brianda Pereira (c. 1550 — c. 1620) was an Azorean known for her role during the Battle of Salga, during the Portuguese resistance against the Spanish occupation in the archipelago, during the reign of Philip II of Spain. The name of Brianda Pereira was mythologized by the Romantic movement at the end of the 19th century, who was elevated to the status of heroine by the Estado Novo regime, affirming Portuguese nationalism. She became a popular figure and used as a protagonist of various theatre folk plays, songs and dances/marches during Carnaval, in addition to being adopted as a matron of various institutions.

== Biography ==
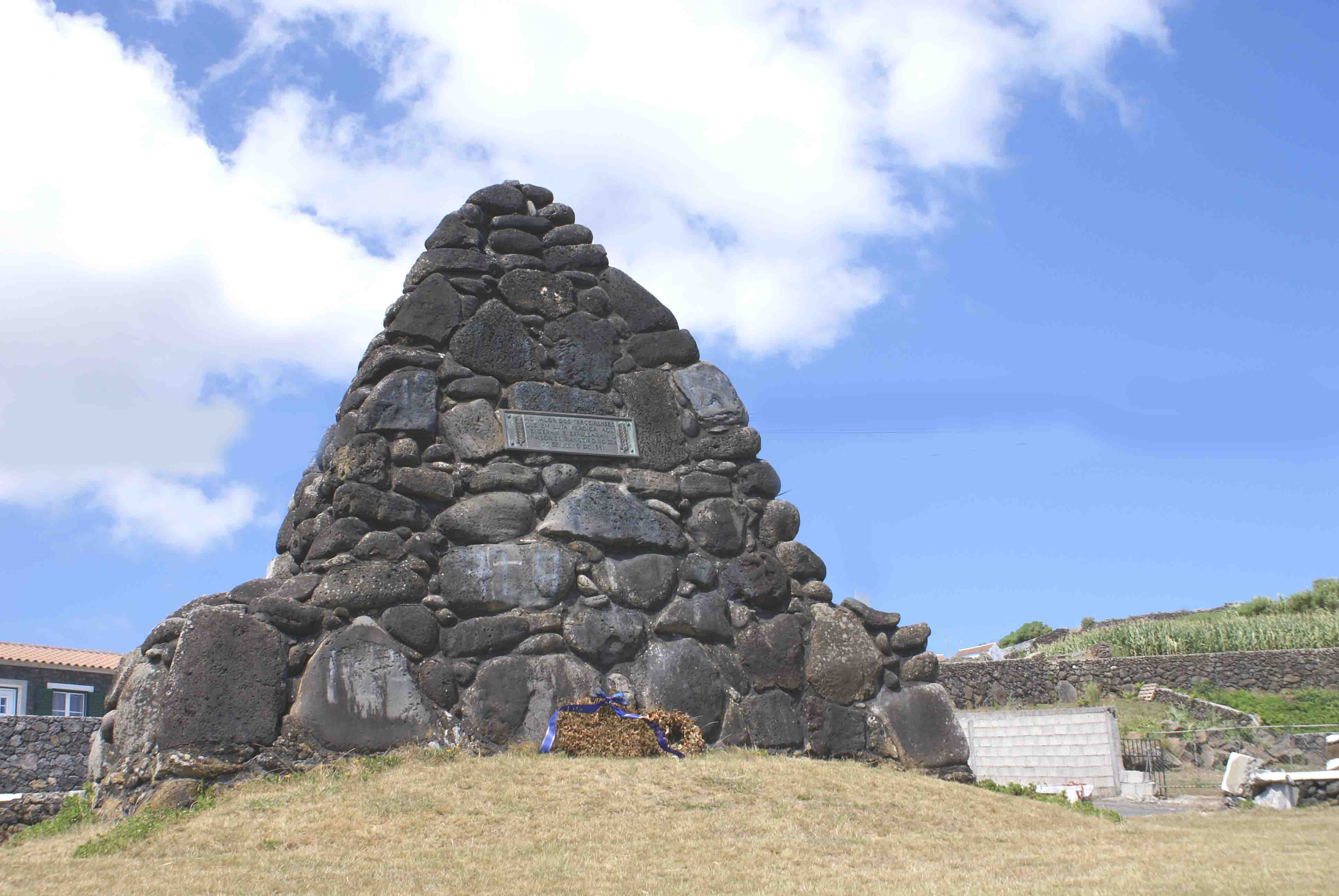
The monument to the Battle of Salga

Brianda Pereira was born in the municipality of Angra do Heroísmo (although there is debate as to whether specifically the city, Porto Judeu and São Sebastião), daughter of Álvaro Anes de Alenquer and Maria Pereira de Sousa. Her father was a simple judge in the Câmara de Angra in 1553 and, a descendant of Pero Anes de Alenquer and his wife, one of the first colonists and nobles to the island of Terceira.

She married Bartolomeu Lourenço, and began living in the valley of Salga, along the coastal area in the village of São Sebastião, where the couple had lands and agricultural estate. They resided there when on 25 July 1581, supporters of Philip II and D. António I battled along the Bay of Salga, where they had their home.

=== Battle of Salga ===
The battle began when Spanish forces landed on the beach, and immediately began burning crops and local homes, likely including the residence of Bartolomeu Lourenço and Brianda Pereira. Her husband was injured in the attack and made prisoner.

Little is written of the role of Brianda Pereira, except by Ângela Pereira (Brianda had a sister who had this name), an anonymous author who wrote:

There lived there one Bartolomeu Lourenço with wife and children; a woman walked in body, being noble woman and girl, and her husband, rich farmer among the people of the land, who had escaped the hands of them [the Spanish soldiers] looking after her husband...The poor woman was crazy, and armed soldiers had taken possession of her home and all their possessions.

Having seen her house burnt down and husband imprisoned and hurt, and her factory in the hands of soldiers, she escaped. She began encouraging the Portuguese to war, and as a young, noblewoman and honourable, she did not want to gather with other women in the Church of São João.

It was from this description, even as the accounts of Friar Pedro de Frias did not mention them, that the mythification of the heroine began. The construction of the myth was attributed to Francisco Ferreira Drummond, whose Anais da Ilha Terceira reinforced the oral tradition of his native home:

...where it was found, and still exists, the estate, or house, of Bartolomeu Lourenço, landed gentry, where he lived with his wife Brianda Pereira, noblewoman and beautiful girl, with whom he had children. It seems her beauty in the early years was a curiosity to the Castilians, because hers was the first prey that they wanted to sack from her house. Happily, this new Lucrecia escaped the hands of the proud Tarquins that intended to take her, her son and husband as prisoners (who was seriously injured). Finding themselves already masters of the house, and all that was therein, they pillaged, destroyed and convulsed to their will the furniture, finally setting the wheat in the thrashing circle.

It is believed that Brianda Pereira was the author of the strategy to send a stampede of cattle towards Castilian troops. José Joaquim Pinheiro, in his Épocas Memoráveis da Ilha Terceira, referred to Brianda Pereira:

...showed her manly spirit, she armed the women who had gone to war with their husbands and children, persuading them with arguments of a virtuous wife and mother unveiled the Terceira people, took their gender to carry on against their enemy with such boldness that would attain salvation of their elder prisoner and son, both quite wounded. But, this heroic Spartan could not avoid the fire that was raging in the house and in the floor...

The final act of the glorification of Brianda Pereira came from the writer Gervásio Lima, who in his inflamed prose stocked the fires of virtude and heroic nationalism. Lima's writings, which were popular in the 20th century, was used heavily in the machinations of the Estado Novo regime, to amplify the heroicness of its inhabitants and neighbour sentiments.
