= Lighthouse of Ponta das Contendas =

Ponta das Contendas Lighthouse Farol das Contendas
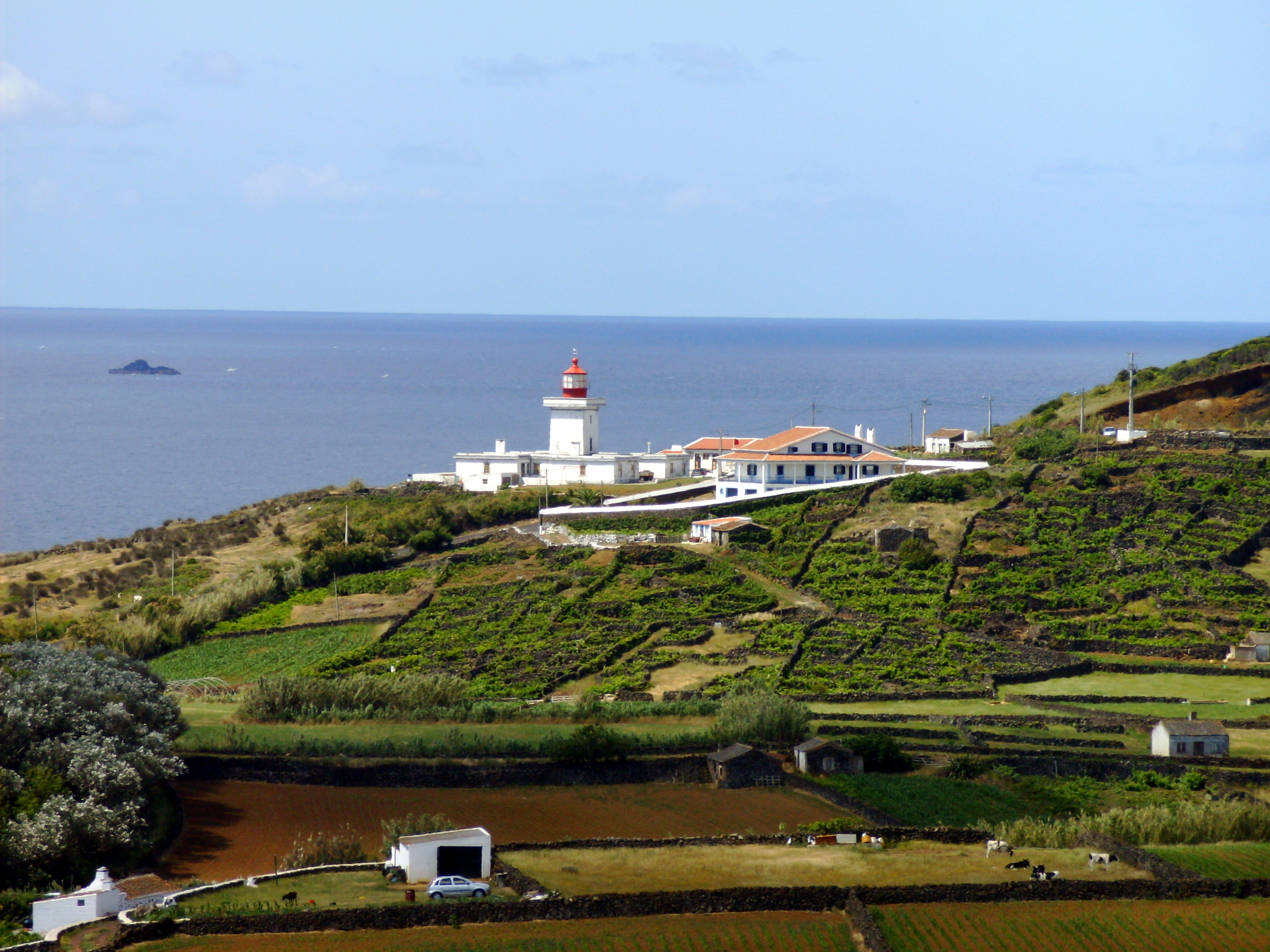
- The Ponta das Contendas Lighthouse in its setting on Contendas Point
- Location: Ponta das Contendas, Terceira Island, Vila de São Sebastião, Portugal
- Coordinates: 38°38′37″N 27°05′04″W

Tower
- Constructed: 1882
- Construction: masonry
- Height: 13 m (43 ft)
- Shape: square tower with balcony and lantern rising from a 1-storey keeper's house
- Markings: white tower, red lantern
- Heritage: heritage without legal protection

Light
- First lit: 1934
- Focal height: 53 m (174 ft)
- Lens: second-order lantern for a fifth-order light with six clarions (original), crystal optic with a third-order Fresnel rotational beacon (current)
- Range: 23 nmi (43 km; 26 mi)
- Characteristic: Fl(4) WR 15s
- Portugal no.: 745

The Ponta das Contendas Lighthouse (Portuguese: Farol da Ponta das Contendas) is lighthouse located along the promontory of Contendas, in the civil parish of São Sebastião, municipality of Angra do Heroísmo on the island of Terceira, in the Portuguese archipelago of the Azores.

== History ==
On 2 March 1882, the Comissão dos Faróis e Balizas (Commission on Lighthouses and Beacons) released the first plans for the installation of a lighthouse in Ponta das Contendas, equipped with a second-order lantern, that would illuminate a 240° focal range with 4 clarions (three white and one red). A year later, there was a determination that Ponta de São Jorge would be a better candidate.

By 1902 the lighthouse had not yet been built. A new commission judged that Ponta de São Jorge was too obscure, and judged that a more convenient site would be Ponta das Contendas. The revised project substituted the second-order lantern for a fifth-order light, with six clarions.

A parcel of land owned by Manuel Ferreira Lourença was purchased in 1926 for 1200$00 réis (equivalent to 6 euros). Finally, in 1930, the construction of the lighthouse began, under the direction of António Tomaz. On 1 February 1934, the completed lighthouse was inaugurated, with the installed third-order lamp (with a 500-millimetre focal distance). At the inauguration:

After all the preparations and at the arrival of the hour, the lighthouse chief lit and put into function the optics, His Excellency the Captain of the Port gave a speech to the people.

The mechanism allowed for a fifteen-second beacon interval, using an incandescent bulb powered by petroleum gas, resulting in a visible range of 32 miles (51 km).

On 1 June 1958, the beacon was electrified. The new electric bulb increased the light's visible range to 38 miles (61 km).

In 1964, a paved road to the lighthouse and connections to the public water system were finally completed.

The lighthouse began to operate with a 1,000-watt/120-volt lamp in 1983, reducing its range to 26 miles (42 km), or 23 nautical miles. This was followed in 1985 by the introduction of a two-sector red lamp, with the objective of assisting navigation in the most dangerous sectors, including those near the islets of Fradinhos.

In 1998, the connection to the public electrical network was completed.

On 1 February 2009, the lighthouse celebrated 75 years of operation on the Contendas Point. Presiding over the ceremony were representatives of the Portuguese and Azorean governments, the Maritime Department, and the Captain of the Port Authority of Angra do Heroísmo. Invited guests included the president of the local government, the Commandant of the Command Zone of the Azores, commander of the Air Base No. 4, U.S. Forces Commander, the President of the Historical Institute of Terceira, and other representatives of local authorities. Public activities which accompanied the speeches included the unveiling of an azulejo to mark the anniversary, the activation of a private radio transmitter, visits by 500 children from 14 schools in Angra do Heroísmo, Porto Judeu, São Sebastião, Praia da Vitória, Areeiro-Fontinhas, Vila Nova, Agualva, Outeiro, and general guided tours with a film "Faróis de Portugal, cinco séculos de história".

== Architecture ==
Located along the maritime coast, in the south-east corner of the island of Terceira, called Ponta das Contendas, it is situated in an elevated zone, resulting in a focal point that is 54 metres above sea level. Although protected by a wall, the lighthouse (ARLHS AZO-007; PT-745; Admiralty D2664; NGA 23532) is on the edge of a high cliff, and accessible only from the Estrada 509, alongside several agricultural fields.

Its plan is composed of four inter-connected rectangular rooms connected by a central body (taking the form of a "H"), on which the main 13-metre-high prismatic white tower is surmounted by a red cupola. The lighthouse building complex consists of three spaces for lighthouse-keepers, two cisterns, an office and inspection room. The first floor terrace gives access to the tower, through two narrow openings, to the terrace, and from there to the dome structure, which is manufactured steel topped by a weather-vane. The building, which is circled by a cornice and terrace, is painted white. The light terrace and the lamp housing atop the building are painted red. The structure is interspersed with square sash windows and sills.

It is illuminated by crystal optic, with a third-order Fresnel rotation beacon, with a 500-millimetre focal length. The light characteristic is four flashes every fifteen seconds (Gp Fl.(4)W.R. 15s), white on 220°–020° and 044°–072° and red otherwise. It is visible for 23 nautical miles (43 km; 26 mi).

== See also ==
- List of lighthouses in Portugal
