= Fort of the Caninas =

Fort in the Azores

- Forte das Caninas
- Terceira, Central, name=Azores in Portugal

Site information
- Type: Fort
- Owner: Portuguese Republic
- Open to the public: Public

Location
- Location of the fort within the municipality of Angra do Heroísmo
- Coordinates: 38°38′34″N 27°4′59″W

Site history
- Built: 16th century
- Materials: Basalt

The Fort of the Caninas (Portuguese: Forte das Caninas), is a medieval fort situated in the Portugueses civil parish of Porto Judeu, municipality of Angra do Heroísmo, in the archipelago Azores.

== History ==
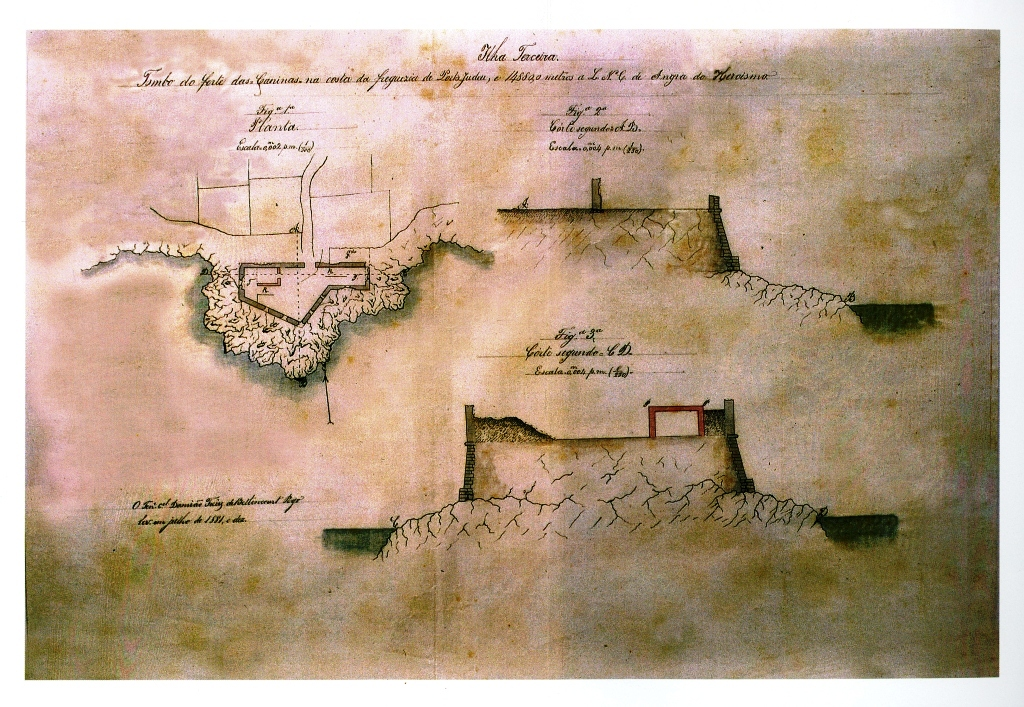
An 1881 plan of the Forte das Caninas

Constructed during the course of the 1580 Succession Crisis by the Azorean Corregedor, Ciprião de Figueiredo e Vasconcelos, it was based on the plan elaborated by Tommaso Benedetto in 1567, after attacks by French corsair Pierre Bertrand de Montluc on Funchal (October 1566) and the attempt on Angra the same year:

"There did not exist at that time [Succession Crisis of 1580] in all the coast of the island of Terceira a fortification, except that of São Sebastião, a post that all along the southern coast there existed a few redoubts and stations, in the localities more susceptible to enemy disembark, from the indication and plan of engineer Tomás Benedito, who in his diligence he went about in 1567, later that, in 1566, the French, commanded by the terrible pirate Caldeira, barbarously had sacked the island of Madeira, and intended to do the same thing on this island, where it appears they were repelled at force of arms"

Francisco Drummond noted:

"...it is a little ahead of [the Fort of Cavalas] was built the fort of Caninas."

Drummond went on to note, that the fort was reconstructed in 1653, at the expense of the municipal council (taking on the majority of the build), following damage caused by waves crashing along the coast, at a time when 50 known pirate ships circled the waters of the archipelago.

During the context of the War of Spanish Succession (1702-1714) the fort was referred to as O Forte das Caninas, in the Fortificações nos Açores existentes em 1710.

With the installation of the Captaincy-General of the Azores, a 1767 report on the fort, indicated:

"8° - Fort of the Caninas. It is rebuilt anew, has five canon emplacements and four pieces and auxiliaries, good; it needs another and to garrison, it needs another five artillerymen and 20 auxiliaries."

The fort was referred to as 7. Fort of the Caninas, in the report Revista aos fortes que defendem a costa da ilha Terceira by the adjunct-of-orders, Manoel Correa Branco, in 1776, who described the fort in these terms:

"Also rebuilt anew, it does not need any work"

The Relação of Field Marshall Baron of Bastos (in 1862) suggested that the fortress was unable to perform its duties. By 1881, the fort was already abandoned and used to graze goats. This did not improve, as maritime erosion escalated and the walls fell into ruin.

In the context of the Second World War, a military post was erected on the site and portions of the walls were used to build a small building to garrison troops. One of the walls of this building remains intact.

== Architecture ==
The fort is located on a dominant position along the coast, consisting of a fortification built to protect the island from pirate and privateer attacks, crossing fire with the Fort of the Cavalas, located 560 metres (1,840 ft) in the Bay of Salga and the entrance to the Bay of Mós.

The bastion consists of an irregular 330 metres (1,080 ft) polygon, adapted to the terrain constructed of masonry. The fort's fortification wall cornerstones were constructed of basalt, while other 16th century forts in archipelago were constructed of tuff stones: a softer stone, that minimized the effects of the shells fired by attackers. The plan had space to support five artillery pieces, with two towers for fusiliers (to the east and west corners) and a vaulted magazine.

On the outside of the fort, to the interior left, is the barracks.
