= Fort of Greta (Angra do Heroísmo) =

Portuguese fortification

- Forte de Greta
- Terceira, Central, name=Azores in Portugal

Site information
- Type: Fort
- Owner: Portuguese Republic
- Open to the public: Public

Location
- Coordinates: 38°38′37″N 27°4′38″W

Site history
- Materials: Plastered stone, Basalt, Wood, Tile roof

The Fort of Greta (Portuguese: Forte da Greta) is a fort along the promontory of Santa Catarina, on the western edge of the Bay of Mós, in the civil parish of Vila de São Sebastião, in the municipality of Angra do Heroísmo, on the Portuguese archipelago of the Azores.

== History ==
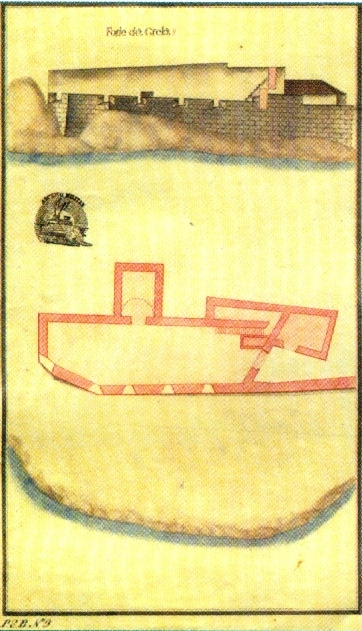
The 1830 plan of the Fort of Greta (José Rodrigo de Almeida, GEAEM)

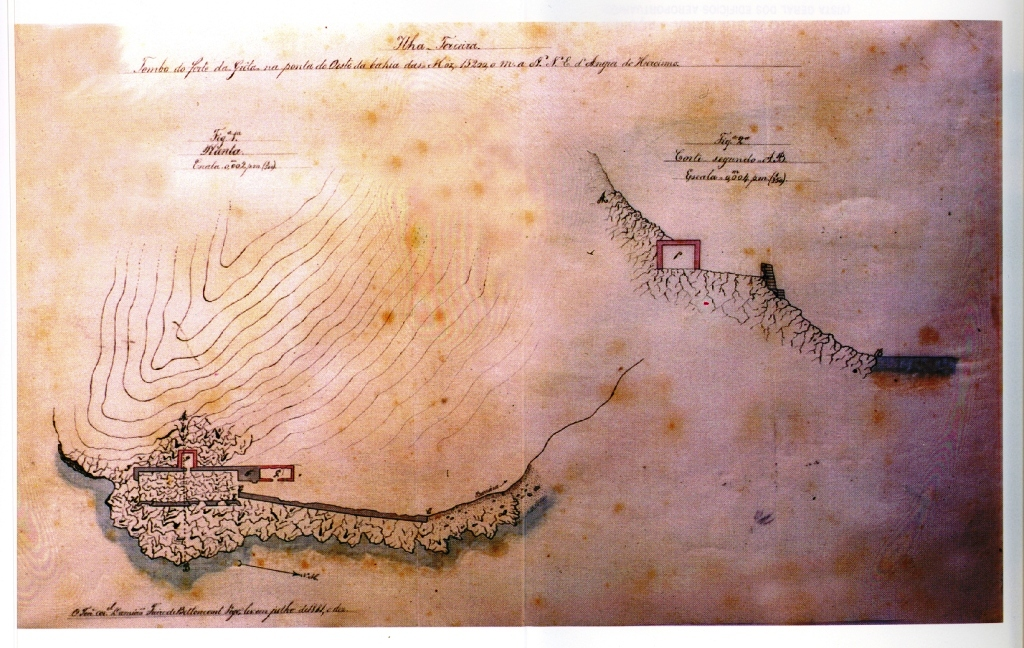
A chart from the Planta do Forte da Greta by Damião Pego (July 1881)

The Fort of Greta was a fortification constructed on Terceira during the context of the 1580 Succession Crisis by the Corregedor of the Azores (Ciprião de Figueiredo e Vasconcelos). Its construction was part of the defensive plan originally elaborated by Tommaso Benedetto in 1567, following the attacks of the French pirate Pierre Bertrand de Montluc, who attacked Funchal in October 1566 and later in Angra:

"There didn't exist at that time [during the Succession Crisis of 1580] all along the island coast some fortress, except that of São Sebastião, that if along the southern curtain there had been a few redoubts and stations, in the areas susceptible to enemy disembarkation, due to the indications and plan of engineer Timás Benedito, that in his diligence he undertook in the year 1567, after which, the French, led by the terrible pirate Caldeira, barbarously sacked the island of Madeira, and intended to do the same on this island, where it appears they were repelled at force of arms."

Drummond described the fort in this context:

In the bay...das Mós, which is the deepest of the island, and where the Minas islets, well recognized in the maritime charts, they constructed the fort of Greta; and the Fort of Santa Catarina das Mós, for their situation and construction could be considered a castle; and a wall fortification to enclose it, whose remains there exist; and the islet created a bastion, in the locality where for years in front, the Municipal Hall ordered construct the Fort of Bom Jesus.

It was successful in the defense of D. Pedro de Valdés forces in 1581, following the Battle of Salga on 25 July 1583, but was unable to impede the landing along the Bay of Mós between 26 July and 27 July 1583 by Spanish forces under the command of D. Álvaro de Bazán. This larger force was responsible defeat the military resistance on the island of Terceira during the Conquest of the Azores.

During the War of Spanish Succession (1702-1714) the fort was referred to as the Redoubt of Greta, in the Fortificações nos Açores existentes em 1710.

Following the installation of the Captaincy-General of the Azores the fort was described in 1767 as:

9° - Fort of Greta. It is discharged from service again, it has six canon emplacements, and four iron pieces capable with its men, it requires two more with men and for the garrison it requires six artillerymen and 24 auxiliaries.

It was also referred as the 8. Fort of the Grotto the first of the Bay called das Mós, in the report Revista aos fortes que defendem a costa da ilha Terceira, prepared by the adjunct Manoel Correa Branco (1776), who described the fort in this term: Also it is rebuilt anew, it does not need work.

During the context of the Portuguese Civil War (1828-1834) the fort returned to a strategic importance, and was referenced in the Colecção de Plantas e Alçados de 32 Fortalezas dos Açores, by José Rodrigo de Almeida in 1830, from the Gabinete de Estudos de Arquitetura e Engenharia Militar (Architectural and Military Engineering Studies Cabinet) in Lisbon.

In the Relação of Field Marshall Baron of Bastons, in 1862, the site was first identified as in the parish of Porto Judeu, but was considered incapable of defending the region for several years. Similarly, the Tombos (in 1881), referred to as being very ruined for being found abandoned and almost ignored for many years. The walls are toppled....

In the 20th century, its condition had little improved: it continued to exist in ruins, extending along the southern coast for 18 metres (59 ft), with vestiges of some cornerstones. On the ground are various construction materials, that include tile and mortar, with a rectangular structure along the south that includes two niches.

== Architecture ==
It is situated in a dominant position along the coast, a fortification destined to defend the anchorage from pirate or privateer attacks that played the waters of the mid-Atlantic. It crossfired with the Fort of Santa Catarina das Mós and the small unnamed bastion that existed along the point south of the bay. This small bastion was later substituted the Fort of Bom Jesus.

The bastion fortification has an organic plan, adapted to the terrain, with walls in stonework, broken by four canon emplacements oriented to the bay, while two towards the south. The gunpowder magazine was partially excavated into the cliff face of the flank along the promontory of Santa Catarina. There are still vestiges of barracks and an earthen kiln to produce the ammunition.

The fort is complemented by a trench for fusiliers, that ran parallel to the coast until it connected the Fort of Santa Catarina. Today, the trenches are practically non-existent, being systematically destroyed following the destruction of the barriers.

Access to the fort is made along an open public road.
