= Conquest of the Azores =

Naval battle between Spain and Portugal (1583)

- Part of the War of the Portuguese Succession
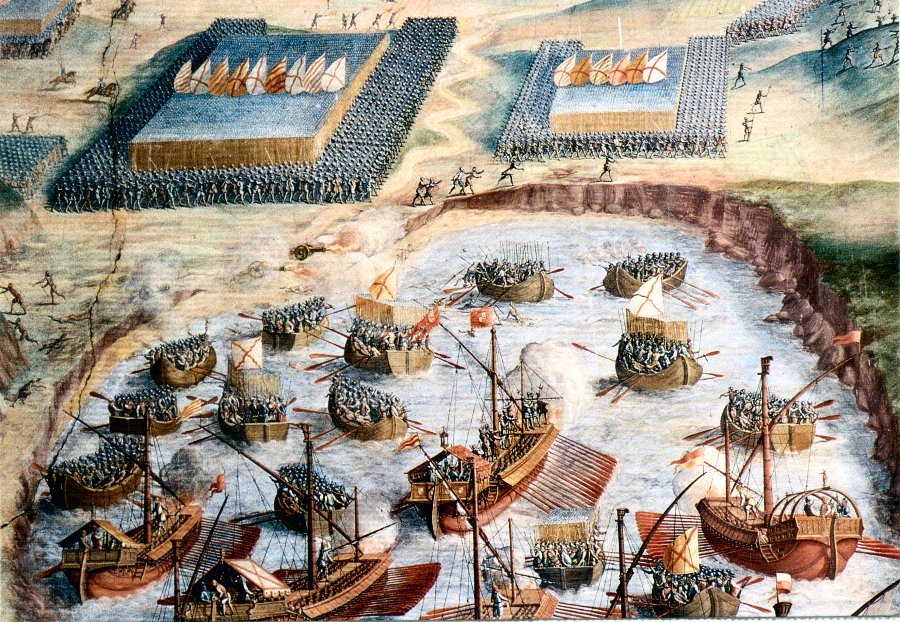
- The Spanish Tercios landing on Terceira (July, 1583), in El Escorial Hall of Battles.
Date	2 August 1583
Location	Terceira Island, Azores Islands
Result	Victory for Philip I of Portugal

Belligerents
(Portugal) Portuguese loyal to Prior of Crato; France; England	Spain; Portuguese loyal to Philip I of Portugal

Commanders and leaders
(Portugal) Prior of Crato	(Spain) Álvaro de Bazán

Strength
9,200 men 30 warships	11,700 men 96 warships

Casualties and losses
9,000 dead or captured (Mostly prisoners); 30 warships captured	400 dead or wounded

The Conquest of the Azores (also known as the Spanish conquest of the Azores), but principally involving the conquest of the island of Terceira, occurred on 2 August 1583, in the Portuguese archipelago of the Azores, between forces loyal to the claimant D. António, Prior of Crato, supported by the French and English troops, and the Spanish and Portuguese forces loyal to King Philip II of Spain, I of Portugal commanded by the Admiral Don Álvaro de Bazán, Marquis of Santa Cruz, during the War of the Portuguese Succession. The victory of the Marquis of Santa Cruz resulted in the rapid Spanish conquest of the Azores, facilitating the integration of the Kingdom of Portugal and its colonial possessions into the Spanish Empire.

Following a day's fighting, forces of the island of Terceira were defeated by Spanish Tercios, using the strategies and tactics of Álvaro de Bazán. A few days later, a contingent of Spanish-Portuguese troops landed on the island of Faial, where they defeated and captured a garrison of five French and one English company (700 men in total). At the end of the campaign, approximately 9,000 Portuguese, French, Italian, and English were captured by the Spanish. The French, English, and Italian soldiers on the islands were allowed to retire unharmed, but 16 supporters of the Portuguese claimant, António, Prior of Crato, who had attempted to flee on the night of the attack were executed: António and a few of his supporters were lucky to escape with their lives.

== Background ==
After the victory at the Battle of Ponta Delgada, the Marquis of Santa Cruz, secure within his Lisbon base, prepared an amphibious invasion of overwhelming force: 15,372 men and 98 ships, including 31 big merchantmen converted as troop transports, small vessels and landing craft, fighting galleons, 12 galleys, and 2 galleasses. This time his aim was not to fight a fleet but to land an army: the task force could certainly defend itself if necessary, but its primary role was to put troops, together with their supporting equipment and supplies, on a selected beach-head and then to back them up until the military objectives had been gained. Philip II ordered Bazán by letter to hang those French and English subjects on the island caught in arms against his forces.

The Terceirans expected the Spaniards to land at the harbours of Angra and Peggia, and had disposed their forces – under Charles de Bordeaux and Battista Scrichi – accordingly. However, Santa Cruz decided to deliver his main thrust at Mole, a beach 10 miles from Angra defended only by light earthworks occupied by infantry with some artillery support. António himself was on Terceira, where he supervised the raising of levies for defense, but left in November to persuade the French to furnish another 1,500 men, who arrived in June 1583. The Queen Mother of France, Catherine de' Medici, sent 1,200 French and 400 English soldiers organized in 9 companies under Aymar de Chaste, governor of Dieppe, who took the command of the islands.

De Chaste increased the fortifications of Terceira by building, on its southern and most exposed coast, up to 31 stone forts and 13 fascine outposts, connected altogether by trenches and furnished with a total of 293 cannons. The quality of the defending troops was diverse: the French and English were veteran soldiers, while the local militia under the command of the governor Manuel da Silva was unreliable for the battle. On the other hand, most of the Spanish troops, which included 3 tercios, 1 German regiment of 4 companies, 3 Italian companies, and one Portuguese company, were well-disciplined veterans of the Dutch Revolt.

== Landing ==
The Spanish army landed on Calheta das Mós, next to Angra, in the early hours of 26 July. The date for the landing was selected because it was the first anniversary of Bazán's victory over the French fleet at Ponta Delgada. At 03:00 the 12 Spanish galleys led by Captain Diego de Medrano headed to the beach with the landing craft in tow carrying 4,500 soldiers aboard, with Bazán commanding the operation in person. The beach was guarded by the fort of Santa Catarina, garrisoned by a French captain named Bourguignon with 50 Frenchmen and 2 Portuguese companies. As the Spanish ships were sighted at dawn, Bourguignon opened fire with Santa Catarina's artillery. Passing within arquebus shot, Bazán's flagship, leading the way, received heavy gunfire and lost its coxswain. Backed up by nine other galleys, however, he silenced the fort.

The landing craft made their way to the beach and landed the infantry; among the first men ashore was Rodrigo de Cervantes, brother of Miguel de Cervantes. They were met by arquebus fire directed from the trenches and ramparts which caused several fatalities and many wounded. The fort was then carried by assault with scaling ladders, with Bourguignon and 35 of his men killed during the fighting. The capture of Santa Catarina allowed the Spanish to land the rest of the infantry, six cannons, and supplies, and easily took control of the surrounding heights. Bazán then ordered his force to advance towards Vila da Praia to meet the French army. De Chaste also gathered his troops with eight cannons to counter the Spanish .

== Battle ==
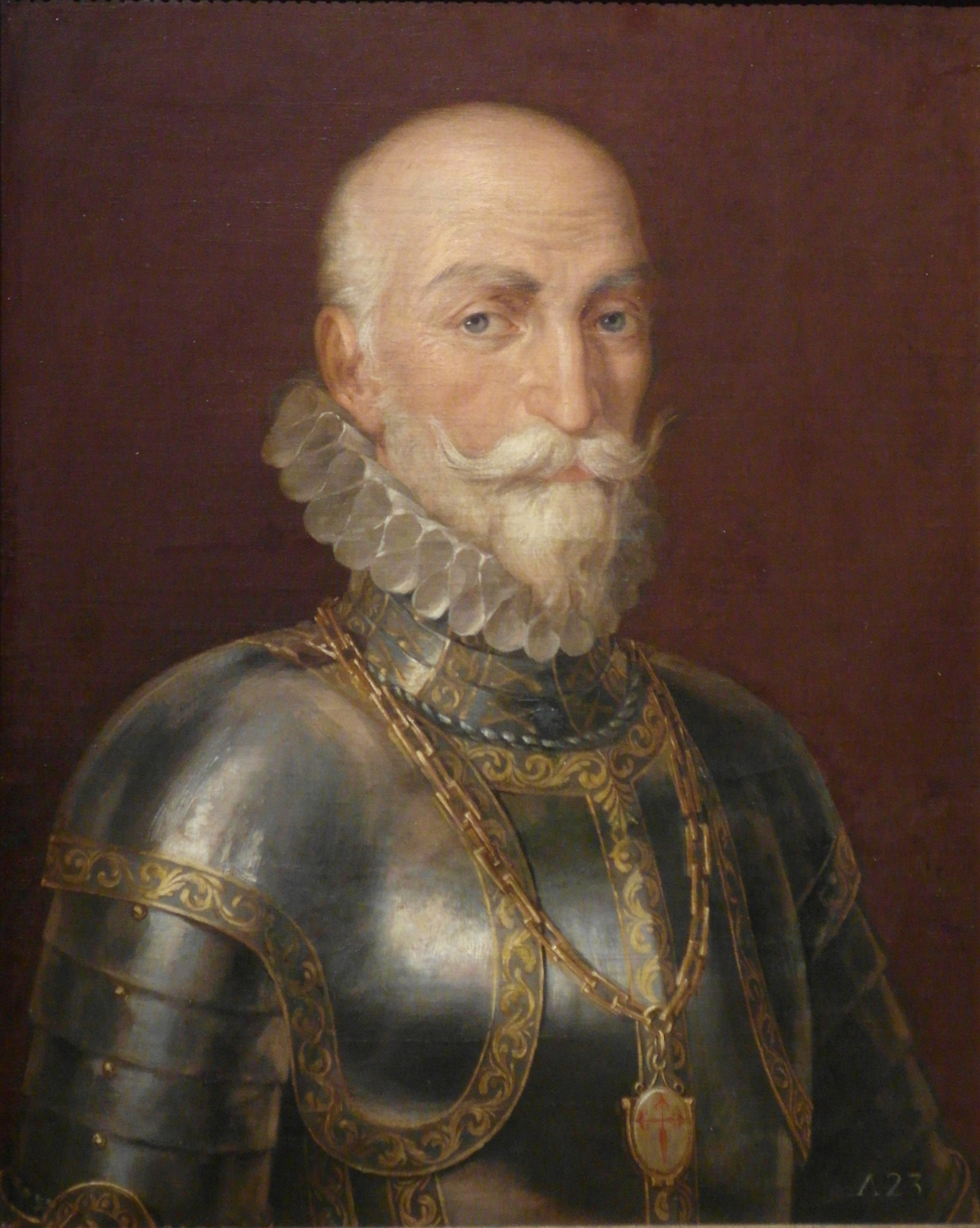
Spanish Admiral Don Álvaro de Bazán. Naval Museum of Madrid.

Bazán formed his army into three lines, the Germans on the right wing and the Spanish on the left. The vanguard was formed by sleeves of arquebusiers which met a heavy resistance in the hedges and fences of the ground. From there, De Chaste launched fierce counterattacks and managed to break the Spanish first line several times. However, Bazán reinforced his arquebusiers with German pikemen and held the ground. By the afternoon, Manuel da Silva arrived at the battlefield with 1,000 Portuguese soldiers and a herd of cows to launch over the Spanish battalions. De Chaste felt himself strong enough to renew the attack. However, the nightfall prevented this. After 16 hours of fighting, the Spanish army had lost 70 men killed and 300 wounded, against 70 French and Portuguese deaths and over 400 wounded or prisoner.

The morning after the battle De Chaste was abandoned by his Portuguese allies, who fled to the mountains inside the island. The Spanish took the initiative soon and advanced upon São Sebastião. De Chaste retired with his French troops to the mountain of Nossa Senhora da Guadalupe, allowing Bazán to capture Angra unmolested. There, 13 French, 16 Portuguese, and 2 English ships were seized by the Spanish galleys. 30 Spaniards and 21 Portuguese partisans of Philip II were freed from the jail. The French meanwhile, began to dug trenches on the slopes of Nossa Senhora da Guadalupe, but the soldiers mutinied and opened negotiations with the Spanish to surrender. De Chaste managed to suppress the mutiny, but as the Portuguese militia subdued to Bazán, he realized that the victory was not possible and continued the talks.

De Chaste, owing his friendship with the Spanish Maestre de Campo Pedro de Padilla, whom he served in the Great Siege of Malta against the Ottomans, expected to obtain good terms. In the end, however, only the officers were allowed to keep their weapons. The English and Italian soldiers were included in the negotiations, but not the Portuguese rebels.

== Faial ==
On 30 July, Pedro de Toledo sailed from Angra with 12 galleys, 4 pataches, and 16 pinnaces, with 2,500 soldiers aboard, to seize the island of Faial, where 400 or 500 French and English soldiers still held out supported by the locals. Toledo sent an emissary to negotiate with the foreign troops, but the Portuguese commander, António Guedes de Sousa, murdered him. Toledo landed his troops and took the Fort of Santa Cruz. The French and English soldiers were given the same pacts as De Chaste's men on Terceira, but Guedes de Sousa had his hands cut off and was hanged in retaliation for the emissary's death. On 8 August the Portuguese governor, Manuel da Silva, was beheaded in Angra by the executioner of the German regiment.

== Consequences ==
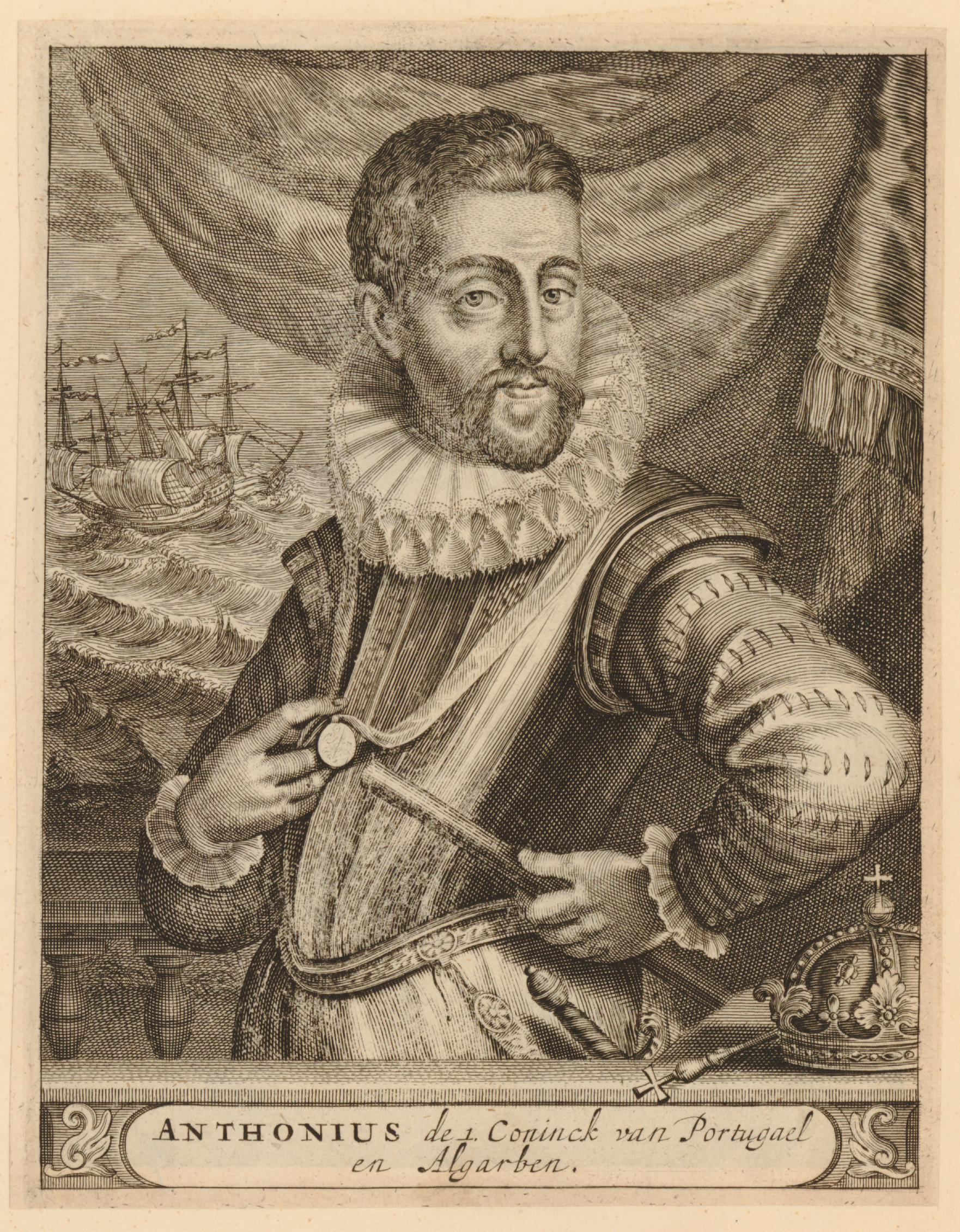
Dom António managed to escape from Terceira Island with some of his men.

With the conquest of the Terceira Island, the Azores Islands were completely controlled by the Habsburg King, Philip II of Spain (Philip I of Portugal), and the war ended with the complete incorporation of the Kingdom of Portugal and its colonial possessions into the Spanish Empire. Dom António returned to France and lived for a time in Rueil, near Paris. In 1589, the year after the Spanish Armada, he accompanied an English expedition, supported by the United Provinces of the Netherlands, under the command of Sir Robert Devereux, Earl of Essex, Sir Francis Drake, and Sir John Norreys, to the coast of Spain and Portugal, where the English Armada was routed.

Fear of spies, employed by Philip II of Spain, drove Dom António from one refuge to another until he finally went to England. Elizabeth I of England and her advisers viewed with trepidation the rising tide of Spanish victories (the conquest of the Azores Islands in the south and of the Flemish coast in the north) in 1583.

== See also ==
- War of the Portuguese Succession
- Spanish Empire
- Iberian Union
- History of Portugal
- Anglo–Spanish War (1585)
- Timeline of Portuguese history
