= Battle of Salga =

Military battle in 1581 during the War of the Portuguese succession

Coordinates: 38°36′56″N 27°5′51″W

- Part of War of the Portuguese Succession
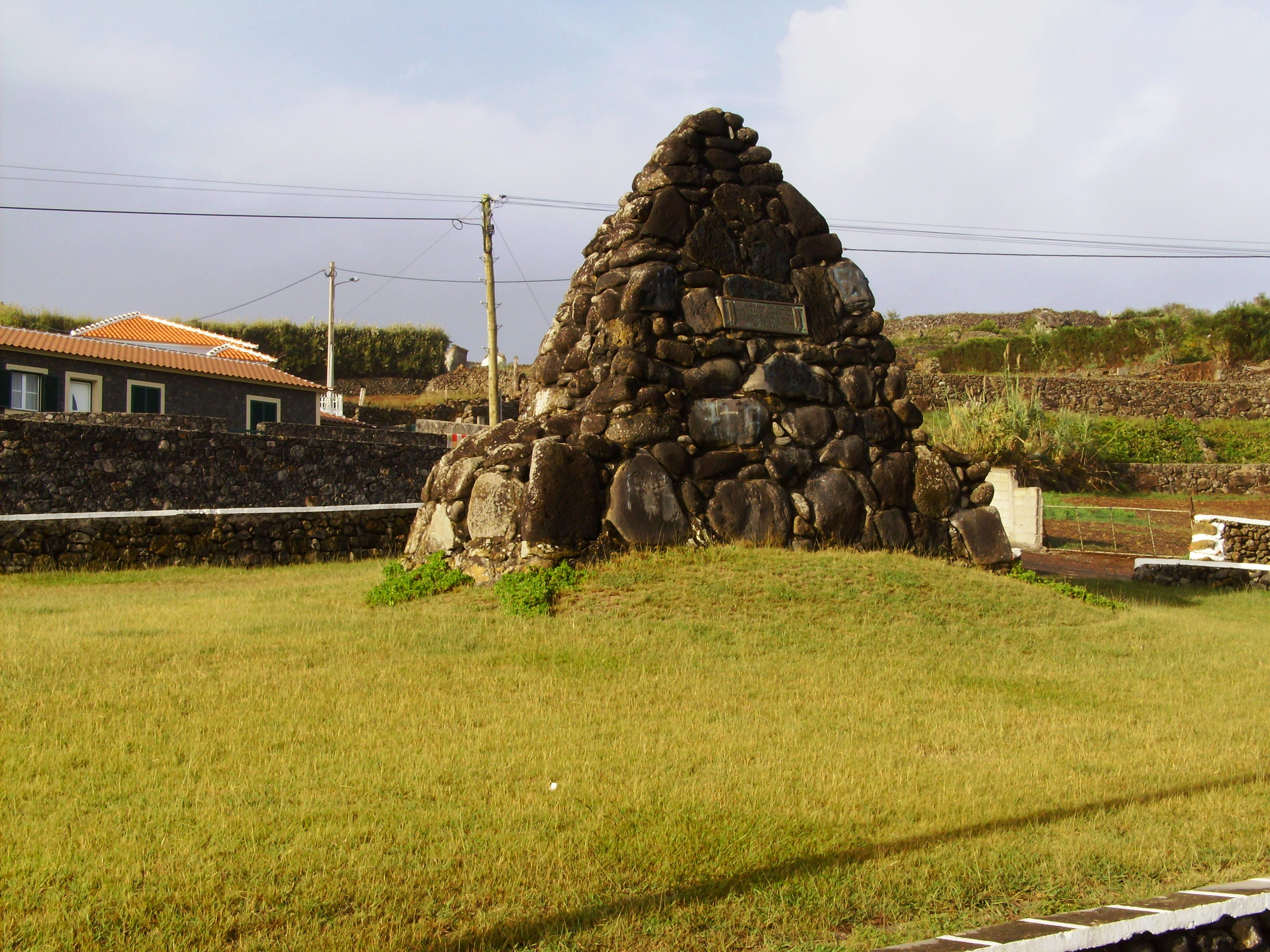
- Monument erected to mark the Battle of Salga
Date	25 July 1581
Location	Salga Bay, Terceira, Azores
Result	Victory for António, Prior of Crato

Belligerents
(Portugal) Portuguese loyal to António, Prior of Crato; France	Spain (Portugal) Portuguese loyal to Philip I

Commanders and leaders
(Portugal) Ciprião de Figueiredo	(Spain) Pedro de Valdez

Strength
6,000 troops	8 galleons 1 patache 1 caravel 1,000 troops

Casualties and losses
approx. 100	approx. 500

The Battle of Salga occurred on 25 July 1581, around the Bay of Salga and along the coastal part of the parish of Vila de São Sebastião, on the island of Terceira in the Portuguese Azores, between Spanish and Portuguese forces. The latter, in the name of António, Prior of Crato, successfully defended the island against the personal union with the Spanish crown during the War of the Portuguese Succession.

== Background ==
After a successful conquest of the Kingdom of Portugal, Philip II of Spain was confronted with a new conflict with António, Prior of Crato, forcing the former to delay the acclamation and recognition of his son, Diego, Prince of Asturias, as heir and legitimate successor to the Portuguese Crown.

Philip had opened the Junta dos Estados (English: Council of States) on 17 April, 1581, to establish guarantees for the Portuguese Crown, and to facilitate this, he published an amnesty for those implicated in supporting the Prior of Crato during the succession crisis. However, it was not a general amnesty and contained many artificial clauses that the King refused to alter, including the refusal to pardon many, including António, the Count of Vimioso, the Bishop of Guarda (son of the Count), as well as 52 others.

When he eventually arrived in Almada, the King was advised of the bad disposition that existed on the island of Terceira towards his reign and that they had refused to accept Ambrósio de Aguiar Coutinho as the new governor. Consequently, he ordered the preparation of an armada that could potentially secure the island of São Miguel, place locals under the obedience of the Crown, and facilitate shipping to the Indies. The fleet, under the command of Pedro de Valdez, was ordered to take Terceira until greater forces could be sent to assist in the control of the Azores. With Pedro, Phillip sent letters to the government in Angra do Heroísmo and particular instructions for the residents of the island, saying that with peace the new restrictions would be alleviated.

== Armada ==
From his base on the island of Santa Maria, Pedro de Valdez awaited the arrival of reinforcements from the continent. While there, he trained his crews and continued repairs on the fleet. By spring, he had left Santa Maria with seven large carracks and 1,000 troops. His small armada arrived at São Miguel, where he took on provisions that were supplied by Governor Ambrósio de Aguiar Coutinho, and his cousin, Juan de Valdez, who had joined the fleet. The group included eight galleons, one patache, and a fire ship that was there initially to observe; it was with this detachment that they embarked for Terceira.

=== Angra ===
On the morning of 5 July 1581, the armada appeared on the horizon, visible from the Bay of Angra to the east. There was a mixed reaction in the populace upon the fleet's arrival, as the island's residents were equally divided between the two factions. Some believed the fleet to be António's supporters from France (he had petitioned Catherine de Medici for help) and England, with much-promised aid, while the remaining nobles hoped that it had brought Philip II's armies to subjugate the island and put an end to António's reign. His supporters, confident in the support of their allies, were not as vigilant as they should have been as the ships appeared on the horizon; their hopes of triumph and confidence in their cause blinded them to the true nature of the fleet, and they were not prepared for an attack.

This immediately changed as the ships crossed in front of the port and began to shell the city and the ships in the harbour. At the time, the fortress of Santo António did not exist, and troops from the ships disembarked the next morning near Monte Brasil, confiscated a fishing boat that could have been used to alert the residents, and strengthened their positions overlooking the city by the third night. The commander, Valdez, sent a dispatch to Governor Ciprião de Figueiredo e Vasconcelos and the rest of the landed gentry, instructing them to surrender in the name of King Philip II and advising them that the monarch was willing to pardon them for their rebellion and provide them with other favours with the King's peace. Valdez finally noted that should they refuse, he was ready to send 1,000 troops to take the island without providing a quarter to anyone.

=== Reaction ===
Most islanders reacted belligerently towards the Castilian, seeing the threats of force and favourable promises as nothing more than bluster. The Terceirenses, although small in number, were not interested in reconciliation with Lisbon unless their patron, António, was willing to accept them. António was popular with the island residents, who embraced him as their sovereign and swore fealty. This reaction, although expected, also indicated the degree of support of rural islanders, and he was forced to wait in Angra Bay for news from Philip II.

Philip II of Spain heard of the state of Terceira and its dependants, and, except for São Miguel and Santa Maria, its residents rejected the installation of the new governor that he sent to the islands.

Without losing any time, he prepared and armed a few ships necessary to conquer the rebel islands, under the command of Lopo do Figueiroa, to join Pedro Valdez's small flotilla. When Pedro heard that Lopo was on his way and, more importantly, had become the commander of the fleet, charged with conquering the renegade islands, he was incensed. Motivated by ambition, a potential victory, and the glory associated with it, Pedro Valdez decided to disembark his forces in a pasture used by some of his troops to collect fruit or parlay with the local Portuguese. Valdez believed that the following tactic would end the rebellion: dispatch troops to join some of his men on the mainland, take Angra, and refortify the enclave until Lopo de Figueiroa arrived to provide support (which was expected). He gave orders and prepared for the surprise attack the following day.

=== Island defense ===
The islanders had constructed posts along the coast to watch for enemy attacks; these posts were guarded by elements of the local militia and, in some cases, cannons. Consequently, on the morning of 24 July, Governor Ciprião do Figueiredo determined that the enemy, because of a few movements, intended to create a beachhead in the parish of Santo António do Porto Judeu. He ordered a contingent of the militia under Domingos Onsel to rendezvous in the area with 10 pikemen and 20 musket-armed infantrymen and to melt into the local population. In addition, the group was charged with defending the port and coast at the Casa da Salga, an area frequented by many of the Castilians in the days before the attack.

Onsel and his militia marched from Angra with a well-armed, well-monitored group and arrogantly believed their superiority to the unprepared Spanish. As a result, after arriving at Port Judeu and realizing that the local population and coastal defences were adequate, he dismissed his 10 pikemen and ordered them to return to Angra. Fearful of the consequences, the governor sent to Port Judeu a second contingent that included a few infantrymen and horsemen along with the nobles Martim Simão de Faria, António de Ornelas Gusmão, Manuel Pires Teixeira, Manuel Gonçalves Salvago, ou Salgado, Pantaleão Toledo, Domingos Fernandes, and André Fernandes de Seia. The group, in consultation with Domingos Onsel, deliberated that their best option was to divide into smaller groups and stake out points along the coast with some armed soldiers and members of the local population. Each team dispersed into an area of about a league, from Port Judeu's fort to Salga Bay, an act that dispersed their forces considerably.

== Battle ==
On the morning of the feast day of Santiago (25 July), finding the waters peaceful and the wind favourable, Pedro de Valdez ordered troops to set out on small launches and the seized boat, with his first column of 200 well-armed men and some artillery. Valdez planned to disembark his men at Casa da Salga, in the valley of Porto Judeu (a mile from Vila de São Sebastião). Salga Bay was a relatively large bay with a deep channel that allowed easy offloading of men and munitions, and which extended inwards along the valley into a vast plain that reached towards Pico de Garcia Ramos (at the parish's northern limits).

In the early hours, the lookout at Ponta dos Coelhos sounded the alarm to warn that the enemy was drawing near. The bell was rung by the priest, Pereira, in the bell tower of the parochial church of Santo António to awaken the residents to the Spanish intervention. Domingos Onsel and his troops quickly mustered but arrived too late to impede the Spanish landing at Port Judeu. Meeting no resistance, and led by João de Valdez, the Spanish offloaded their artillery and men, including Juan de Bazan (nephew of the Marquess of Santa Cruz), the nephew of the Count of Alba, and many other experienced men, advanced into the valley, while 50 men remained behind to defend the beachhead.

As the battle progressed, a small group of local defenders, captained by Baltasar Afonso Leonardes, arrived in the valley and joined the battle. Meanwhile, from Valdez's carracks another 200 men and arms had offloaded, so that "from daylight there could be on land 400 men, illustrious people, and old soldiers, who surely was fearful; and its order and force exemplified grande soldiers."

The Spanish forces spread into the plain of Vale, while the defenders gathered on the high ground near a spring and manor owned by the farmer Bartolomeu Lourenço, his wife Brianda Pereira (a nobleman's daughter), and their children. Brianda was the object of Spanish attention, and the family home was the first conquest of the battle: her husband was gravely wounded along with one of his sons during the defence, but arrested by the advancing Spanish, as she escaped. The family home was sacked, destroyed, and the wheat store was ransacked. But unfortunately for the Spanish, she was able to motivate and exhort the women in the nearby villages to stand alongside their men in the defence of the island.

By this time, Pedro de Valdez had finally made it to shore, with the rest of his 1,000 troops and made camp at the beachhead.

At about 9:00 in the morning reinforcements arrived from Angra under the command of Sebastião do Canto, Pedro Cota da Malha, Bernardo de Távora, Gaspar Cavio de Barroso, and Francisco Dias Santiago; from Praia, contingents under Gaspar Camelo do Rego and Simão de Andrade Machado; from Vila de São Sebastião Baltasar Afonso (as the Captain-major in the jurisdiction) and André Gato (captain of the forces in Porto Judeu); a contingent of French troops onboard António Eschalim's carrack; and many other people that swelled their ranks to 6,000 combatants. This group slowly advanced on the Spanish in the plain and towards the coast. Captain Artur de Azevedo de Andrade arrived with an artillery piece, marching along the coast towards the beachhead, intent on creating confusion among the Spanish ranks, but he was attacked and retreated. The Spanish dragged the cannon to their camp and sang songs of victory, secured in the belief that they had the advantage, protected by the beachhead and the armada.

=== Lack of Portuguese desertions; Valdez reembarks ===
By midday, no Portuguese had passed onto the Castilian camp, as the latter had expected, either because the main Portuguese leaders were imprisoned or withdrawn in the mountains, or because they saw the defeat of Valdez and his as inevitable due to his risky landing.

Seeing how little he could expect from his party on land therefore, and the fervor with which the Portuguese fought, and the mounting casualties of his soldiers, he retired aboard his ship.

=== The cattle stratagem ===
In this conflict was Friar Pedro, an Augustinian clergyman from Angra (as elsewhere, the friars on this island engaged in military matters), fighting on horseback with a sword in hand; seeing the risk in which the Portuguese were, he advised governor Ciprião de Figueiredo to release a large number of bovine cattle, frightening them onto the enemy with goads and arquebus fire, because they would easily throw the Spanish into disarray, and would serve as an aid to the Portuguese.

As the island was always very abundant with cattle of this kind, the Portuguese soon brought in as much or more than the number of the enemies, and when they arrived, they set them in order, spread out to take up the width and size of the field. Seeing the stratagem one of the Castillians was recorded as having said: — Vien con ganado, gañados somos! ("They're coming with cattle, we're done for!")

Eric Lassota von Steblau, a German from Bleischwitz (modern-day Poland) who recorded in his memoirs his service on the Habsburg fleet wrote:

... in a place called 'Porto Judeos'... but this man released against the Spanish many oxen, broke their ranks, fell from above, exterminated them all, without allowing those who fled to the sea to reach some ship or boat by swimming; he committed great atrocities even against the dead on the island, ripping the hearts out and cutting off the noble parts to make a public demonstration of all."

Many threw themselves into the sea, but as they were equipped with armour, they easily sunk; others, wishing to drop their weapons, could not do so so quickly that they would not be killed, without the boats being able to approach, due to the much gunfire that was being made on against them from land.

As the Castilians were tired of the skirmish, without gunpowder or bullets, and at this time the Portuguese with great impetus attacked them following the cattle, they charged them with such fury and luck, seeing the harm the Spanish had done them, slashing and burning their fields, that in a short time, the Spanish were routed; and when those who were in the rear arrived, they found the battle had subsided, without the Castilians having been able to take advantage of their retreat to the beach because they were killed inhumanly there; even those who surrendered were not forgiven.

Juan de Bazán, nephew of the Marquis of Santa Cruz, and another nephew of the Duke of Alba were killed, as were many other nobles of Castile.

General Ciprião de Figueiredo ordered that everyone should withdraw back up the hills, and leave behind the spoils, under the penalty of death.

Through this victory, not only did the Portuguese recover the artillery that the Castilians had taken from them when they had landed on the island, but also captured that which they brought, the weapons with which they came, flags and boxes, and in the end everything that had been stolen from the islanders.

The following day, 26 July, when the church celebrated the feast of Saint Anna Ana, in Portalegre, in Porto Judeu, there were many feasts, and processions in thanksgiving, for the victory achieved with the loss of so few people. According to António de Herrera, all the residents, men and women and children, and all the religious orders, except the Jesuits, returned to the battlefield to see and desecrate the dead.

Finally, Governor Ciprião de Figueiredo, after having buried the bodies he had driven in carts to a common grave, triumphantly entered the village of São Sebastião, dragging the enemy's flags, and shortly afterwards passed on to the city of Angra, where he was received with elation.
