= Fort of Greta =

Fort of Greta may refer to:

- Fort of Greta (Horta)
- Fort of Greta (Angra do Heroísmo)
