= Fort of the Cavalas =

Fort in the Azores

- Forte das Cavalas
- Terceira, Central, name=Azores in Portugal

Site information
- Type: Fort
- Owner: Portuguese Republic
- Open to the public: Public

Location
- Location of the fort within the municipality of Angra do Heroísmo
- Coordinates: 38°48′40″N 27°5′35″W

Site history
- Built: 16th century
- Materials: Basalt

Fort of the Cavalas (Portuguese: Forte das Cavalas) is a fort situated in the civil parish of São Sebastião in the municipality of Angra do Heroísmo, in the Portuguese archipelago of the Azores.

== History ==
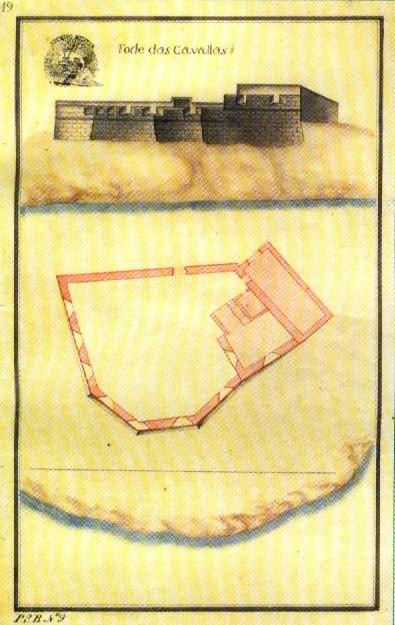
Fort of the Cavalas (José Rodrigo de Almeida, 1830, GEAEM)

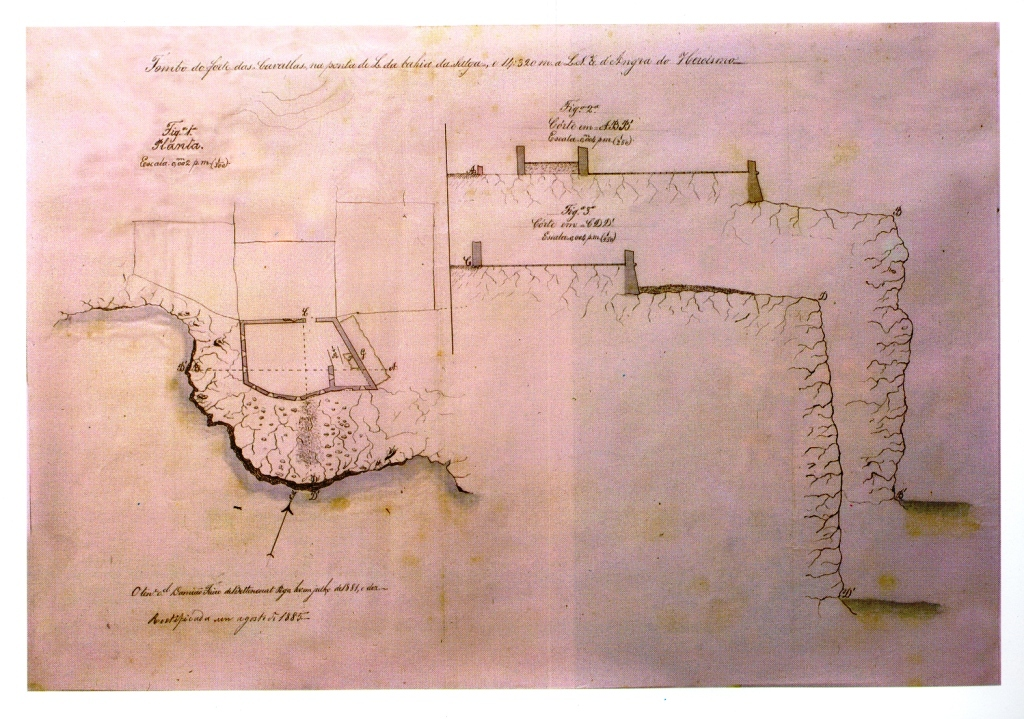
Plan of the Fort of the Cavalas (Damião Pego, Julho de 1881

The Cavalas Fort was one of the fortifications constructed in the context of the 1580 Succession Crisis, by the Corregedor of the Azores, Ciprião de Figueiredo e Vasconcelos, from the defensive plans elaborated by Tommaso Benedetto in 1567, after the attack of the French pirate Pierre Bertrand de Montluc on Funchal (October 1566), and the attempted attack on Angra, also in 1566:

"There did not exist at that time [Succession Crisis of 1580] in all the coast of the island of Terceira a fortification, except that of São Sebastião, a post that all along the southern coast there existed a few redoubts and stations, in the localities more susceptible to enemy disembark, from the indication and plan of engineer Tomás Benedito, who in his diligence he went about in 1567, later that, in 1566, the French, commanded by the terrible pirate Caldeira, barbarously had sacked the island of Madeira, and intended to do the same thing on this island, where it appears they were repelled at force of arms."

Drummond registered: "More ahead [of the Bay of Salga], significant space, was founded the fort of the Cavalas, with wall on the west to defend the natural wharf that there existed..."

In the context of the Spanish Succession (1702–1714) it was referred to as "O Forte das Cavallas", in the "Fortificações nos Açores existentes em 1710".

With the establishment of the Captaincy-General of the Azores, the state of the fort was listed in 1767 as:

"7 Fort of the Cavallos. Was rebuilt anew, it has six good pieces, with its capable repairs and it need two more pieces with its repairs and to garrison eight artillery and 32 auxiliaries."

Manoel de Mattos P. de Carvalho, in his "Notícia da fortificação da ilha Terceira", around 1766:

"There is a fortification in the town of Praia:...13 - the fortress of the Cavallas, with three pieces...all these fortresses are found presently in repair, due to the war." Similarly, it is referred to as "6. Fort of the Cavallas" in the report "Revista aos fortes que defendem a costa da ilha Terceira", the adjunct Manoel Correa Branco (1776), who wrote: "This fort does not require any repairs."

A plan was also referred to as Forte das Cavallas, in the "Colecção de Plantas e Alçados de 32 Fortalezas dos Açores, por Joze Rodrigo d'Almeida em 1806". The Relação of field Marshall Barão de Bastos (1862) situated the fort in the parish of Porto Judeu and indicated that it was incapable of defending the coast. In the survey of the forts of Terceira in 1881, the fortress was abandoned and in a state of ruin.

During the second World War, part of the corner of the old fort was reused to construct the houses used to garrison the machine-gunners posted along the bays of Salga and das Mós.

In 1962, then president of the Câmara Municipal de Angra, Manuel Coelho Baptista de Lima, obtained the concession from the Minister of War. At the time they projected the recuperation of the fort, that included landscaping and the creation of campground. Alongside the Fort of Salga, a similar re-purposing of military fortifications occurred, where they would create a picnic area. Yet, even after these plans, the project never advanced and the fort continued to degrade.

== Architecture ==
Located in a dominant position over a coastal section of the civil parish, the fortification was used for defence of anchorage from pirates and privateers that frequented the waters of the North Atlantic. The fort crossed artillery barrages with the Redoubt of Salga, the Fort of Salga and the Fort of the Caninas.

The bastion-type 465 square metres (5,010 ft^{2}) fortification is based in an irregular polygon, adapted to the cliff and coastal shoreline. With capacity for nine artillery pieces and canon emplacements, the interior spaces include gunpowder magazine accessed by a ramp and a garrison building.
