= Anthony of Sienna =

Anthony of Sienna (?–2 January 1585) was a Portuguese Dominican theologian, so called because of his great veneration for Saint Catherine of Siena. He was born near Braga in Portugal. He studied at Lisbon, Coimbra, and Louvain, eventually coming to teach philosophy at Louvain. There he was made Doctor of Theology in 1571, and in 1574 was put in charge of the Dominican college there.

He was a supporter of António, Prior of Crato, in his claim to the throne of Portugal during the Portuguese succession crisis of 1580; because of this, he was banished from the Spanish dominions. He travelled through Italy, England, and France, studying and writing, until his death at Nantes on 2 January 1585.

== Publications ==
- Edition of Summa Theologica with an index of all authors quoted within: 1569, Antwerp.
- Collaborated in Roman edition of the works of St. Thomas Aquinas, prepared by the order of Pope Pius V: 1570-1571
- Edition of the Quaestiones Disputatae with other works of St. Thomas with an index of all quoted authors: 1571
- Edition of a commentary on the Book of Genesis, supposed at the time to have been a work of St. Thomas, later found incorrect: 1573
- Edition of St. Thomas' commentary on the Books of Maccabees: prepared at Paris in 1584, published in 1612 by Come Morelles, O.P., in the Antwerp edition of the works of St. Thomas.
- Chronicon: 1585, Paris
- Bibliotheca Ordinis Praedicaturum: 1585, Paris
