= Bay of Salga =

Bay on Terceira Island in Azores, Portugal

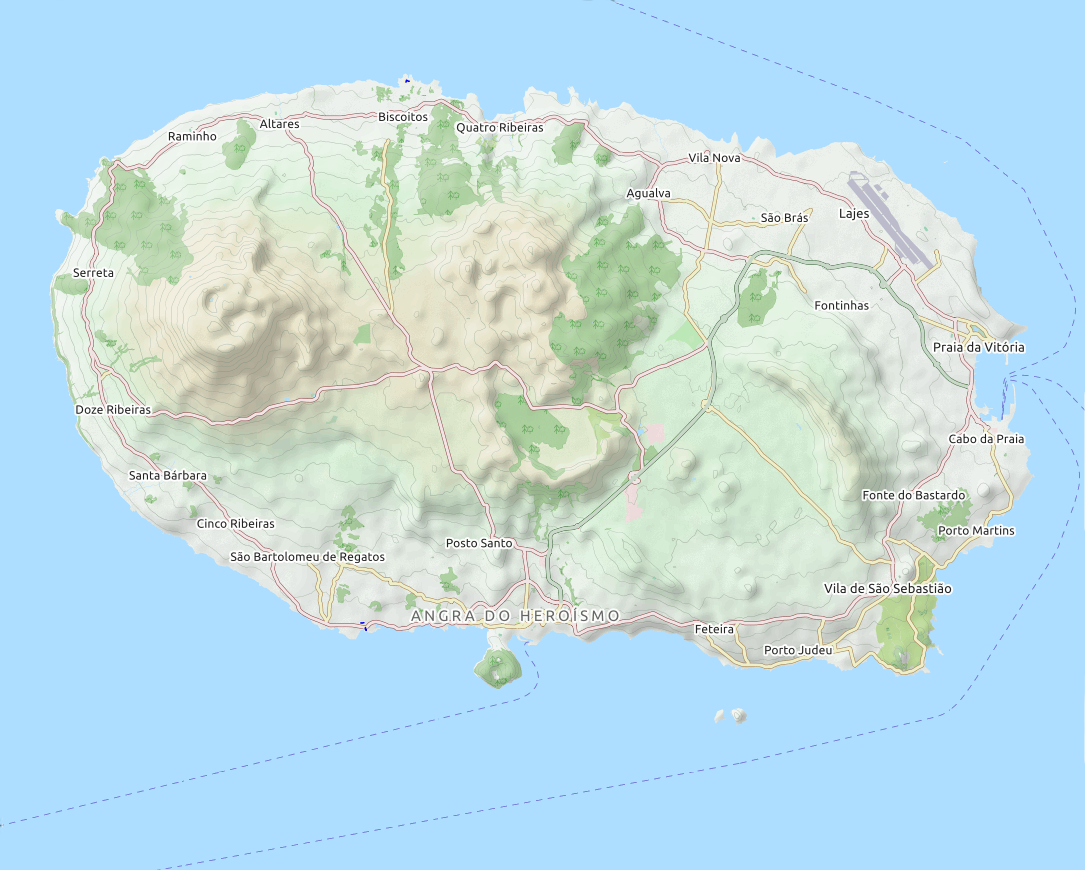
- Location within Terceira
- Location: Azores
- Coordinates: 38°39′N 27°6′W
- Ocean/sea sources: Atlantic Ocean
- Basin countries: Portugal
- Average depth: 40 metres (130 ft)
- Islands: Terceira
- Settlements: Angra do Heroísmo

Bay of Salga (Portuguese: Baía da Salga) is a bay in the civil parish of Vila de São Sebastião, in the municipality of Angra do Heroísmo, in the Portuguese archipelago of the Azores.

It is historically significant for the famous Battle of Salga, which delayed the military conquest of the Azores by Spanish forces on 25 July 1581. Troops loyal to António, Prior of Crato, pretender to the Portuguese throne, defended the island of Terceira in his name against forces loyal to Castile, during the Portuguese succession crisis of 1580.

Alongside the bay is a monument to Brianda Pereira, a peasant woman who led a group of women who released cattle and bulls against the Spanish coming ashore, forcing the troops to return to their ships. This incident permitted the islanders to hold out for another two years, and resulted it becoming the unique independent Portuguese territory not administered by Spain.

The area was transformed into a leisure zone, supported by a campground, small port and natural tidal pools. Also within the proximity of the coast is the former home of Brinda Pereira, which was restored and preserved to mark the heroic woman's perseverance and fortitude.

The beach has been classified by the Regional Government of the Azores (1/2005/A, 15 February 2005) for "intensive use, adjacent or not to the urban agglomerations, that has several infrastructure of elevated level, supports and equipment to secure public service use."

== See also ==
- List of bays in the Azores
