= List of bays in the Azores =

The following is a list of the prominent bays in the islands of the Azores:

== Corvo ==
- Bay of Porto da Casa

== Faial ==
- Bay of Areia da Quinta
- Bay of Ribeira das Cabras
- Bay of Varadouro
- Bay of Horta
- Bay of Porto Pim

== Flores ==
- Bay of Lajes
- Bay of Alagoa

== Graciosa ==
- Bay of Poça
- Bay of Engrade
- Bay of Lagoa
- Bay of Caldeirinha
- Bay of Filipe
- Bay of Folga
- Bay of Quarteiro
- Bay of Ponta da Barca
- Bay of Barra
- Bay of Santo António

== Pico ==
- Bay of Pedrinhas
- Bay of Água Velha
- Bay of Calhau Miúdo
- Bay of Ferro
- Bay of Domingos Pereira
- Bay of Fonte
- Bay of Caravela
- Bay of Céu de Abraão
- Bay of Engrade
- Bay of Calhau
- Bay of Canus
- Bay of Cachorro
- Bay of Barca
- Bay of Lajes do Pico
- Bay of Canas

== Santa Maria ==
- Bay of Anjos
- Bay of Cré
- Bay of Raposa
- Bay of Tagarete
- Bay of São Lourenço
- Bay of Cura
- Bay of Praia
- Bay of Maia

== São Jorge ==
- Bay of Velas
- Bay of Areia
- Bay of Entre Morros
- Bay of Arrais
- Bay of Senhora do Rosário
- Bay of Calheta

== São Miguel ==
- Bay of Santa Iria
- Bay of Água

== Terceira ==
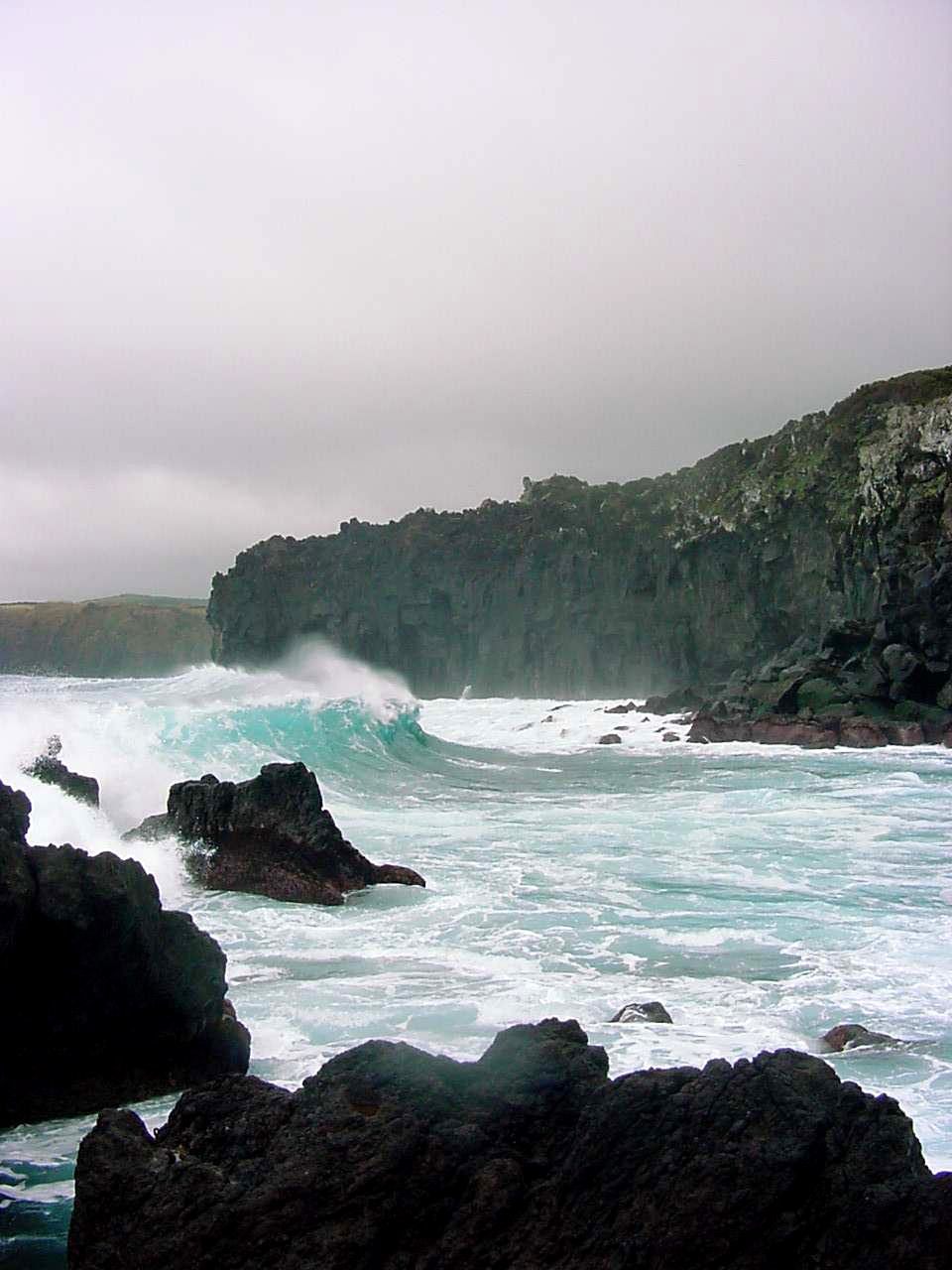
A view of the Bay of Pombas, during a stormy day, on the island of Terceira

- Bay of Angra
- Bay of Tumba
- Bay of Mós
- Bay of Biscoitos
- Bay of Vila
- Bay of Villa Maria
- Bay of Praia da Vitória
- Bay of Angra do Heroísmo
- Bay of Salga
- Bay of Salgueiros
- Bay of Porto Judeu
- Bay of Fanal
- Bay of Contendas
- Bay of Refugo
- Bay of Zimbral
- Bay of Quatro Ribeiras
- Bay of Canas
- Bay of Negrito
- Bay of Agualva
- Bay of Pombas

== See also ==
- List of fajãs in the Azores
