= Francisco Ferreira Drummond =

Portuguese historian (1796–1858)

Francisco Ferreira Drummond (21 January 1796 – 9 November 1858) was a historian, paleographer, musician and politician from a locality of Vila de São Sebastião on the island of Terceira, the Portuguese Azores. He was a historic publisher occupying a better part of his work with documenting the History of the Azores (primarily from the island of Terceira), where he was responsible for writing the Anais da Ilha Terceira ('Annals of the island of Terceira').

== Biography ==
Francisco Ferreira Drummond was born in the modern parish of Vila de São Sebastião, Terceira. He was the son of Tomé Ferreira Drumond, a wealthy landowner, and his wife Rita de Cássia, who delivered Francisco at home on 21 January 1796 and baptized six days later.

The Drummond family was intimately linked to the first educational classes and administrators of the Vila de São Sebastião: Tomé would hold the presidency in 1821, and his older brother, José Ferreira Drummond, was the Ordinance Captain, dominating the local political life for various decades.

Francisco, since his infancy, revealed a vocation in languages and music, under the influence of his paternal uncle the Kings-Master Francisco Machado Drummond. Concluding his early primary instruction, he studied Latin, logic and rhetoric. His musical abilities provided his with a nomination to the organists chair at the Parochial Church in Praia da Vitória in 1811 (at the time he was 18 years old), a position he retained until his death. Complementing this role, he was an organ craftsman assistant, and called on to perform maintenance on organs throughout the island.

=== Liberal Wars ===
With the elevation of the São Sebastião to the status of municipality, he was elected secretary for the municipal chamber in 1822. It was also in this year that the new Portuguese constitutional framework would establish a liberal form of government. In the following year, the Vila-Francada in Portugal (1823) ushered in political persecution of constitutionalists, in which Terceira was not immune. Francisco Ferreira, as with others, saw themselves forced to escape, on 27 July, to the island of Santa Maria, then São Miguel and Madeira, eventually terminating in Lisbon, where he remained exiled for less than a year. With the failure of Prince Miguel's Abrilada rebellion (30 April 1824), Francisco was able to return to Terceira. From there he participated in the struggles of the Portuguese Civil War (1828–1834), which he later described in the Anais da Ilha Terceira.

=== Later life ===
Returning to São Sebastião, he took on the position of secretary for orphans, then administrative secretary for the municipal council and notary. In 1836, he was elected President of the municipal government, a position he held for three years. During his tenure he defended the interests of an autonomous municipality, as well as guaranteeing the construction of aqueducts and channels to transport potable waters from the springs near Cabrito for mills. At the time it was the largest hydraulic public work in Terceira, and one of the largest in the Azores.

In 1839, he was elected Solicitor General for the Junta Geral, while exercising for many more years the role of ombudsman for the Santa Casa da Misericórdia. Ferreira Drummond also supported the fight against the extinction of the municipality of São Sebastião, and through his activity was able to delay its implementation from 24 October 1855 until 1 April 1870.

He died at the age of 63, in the home offered by the Santa Casa da Misericórdia along the Travessa da Misericórdia, in the Vila de São Sebastião.

In 1951, Francisco Ferreira Drummond was honoured a small monument in Rossio, Vila de S. Sebastião.

== Published works ==
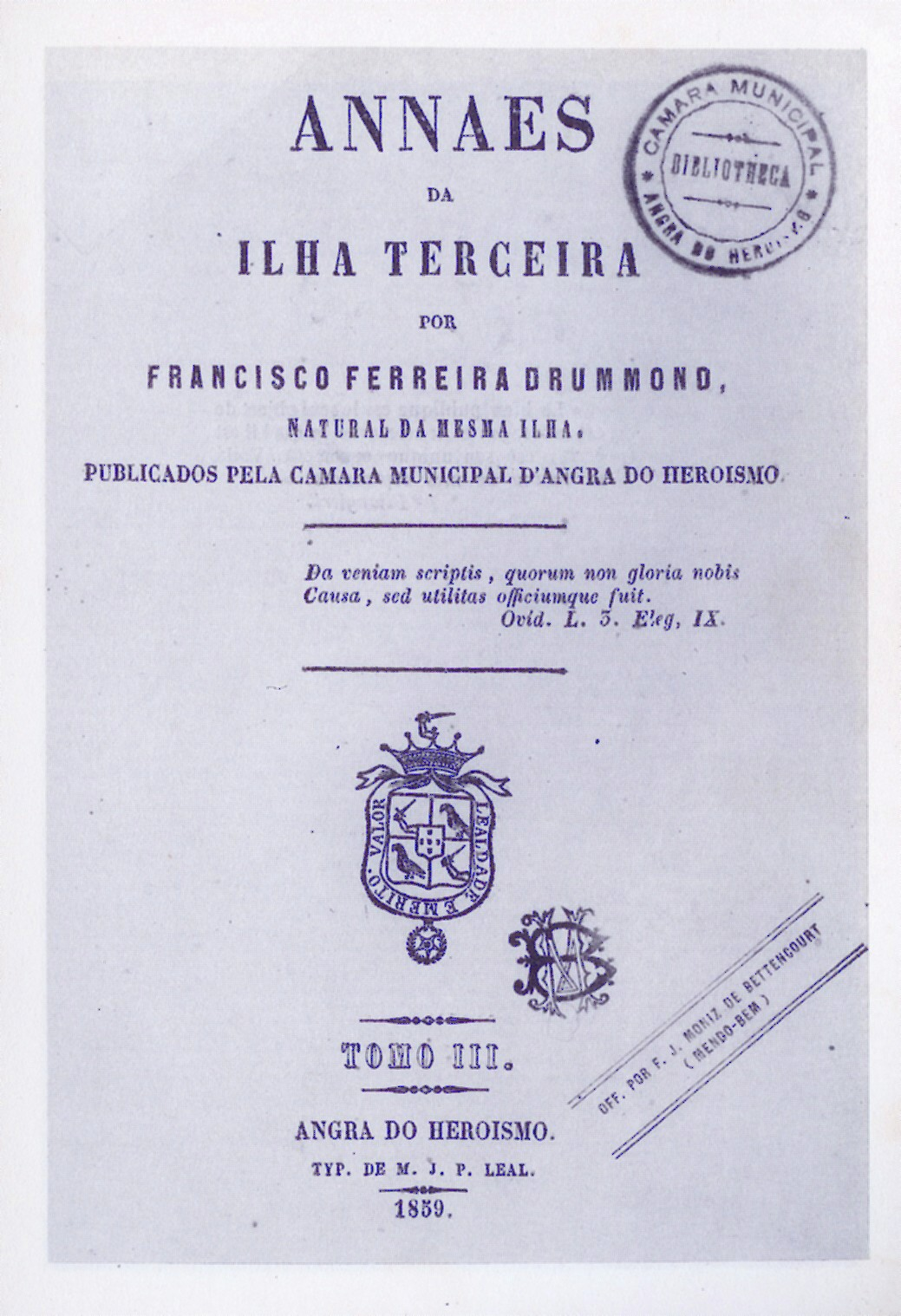
Cover of the 3rd Volume of the Anais da Ilha Terceira

- Memória Histórica da Capitania da Praia da Vitória (Historic Memory of the Captaincy of Praia da Vitória); ed. Câmara Municipal da Praia da Vitória (1846), 56pp Praia da Vitória; republished in the collection Memória Histórica do Horrível Terramoto de 15.VI.1841 que Assolou a Vila da Praia da Vitória (Historic Memory of the Horrible Earthquake of 15 June 1851 that devastated the town of Praia da Vitória), ed. Câmara Municipal da Praia da Vitória (1983)
- Anais da Ilha Terceira (Annals of the island of Terceira); chronological annals of the history of the island of Terceira (1850), and presented by the Câmara Municipal of Angra do Heroísmo. The work contains four volumes, containing 1420 pages and 510 documented references. Volume I was first published in 1850, the second volume in 1856, the third volume in 1859 and the fourth, posthumously in 1864. The work was photocopied and republished in 1981, by the Secretaria Regional da Educação e Cultura (Regional Secretariate for Education and Sciences)
- Apontamentos Topográficos, Políticos, Civis e Eclesiásticos, para a História das Nove Ilhas dos Açores (Notes on the Topography, Politics, Judiciary and Eclesiatics, towards a History of the Nine Islands of the Azores), published by the Instituto Histórico da Ilha Terceira, 648 pp.
