= Forte de Santa Catarina das Mós (Vila de São Sebastião) =

Fort in the Azores archipelago, Portugal

Coordinates: 38°38′43″N 27°04′46″W

Forte de Santa Catarina das Mós (Vila de São Sebastião) is a fort in the Azores which was built in Baía das Mós in 1581. It is located in Angra do Heroísmo, on the island of Terceira.
