= Fradinhos =

Island in the Azores, Portugal

Native name: Os Fradinhos
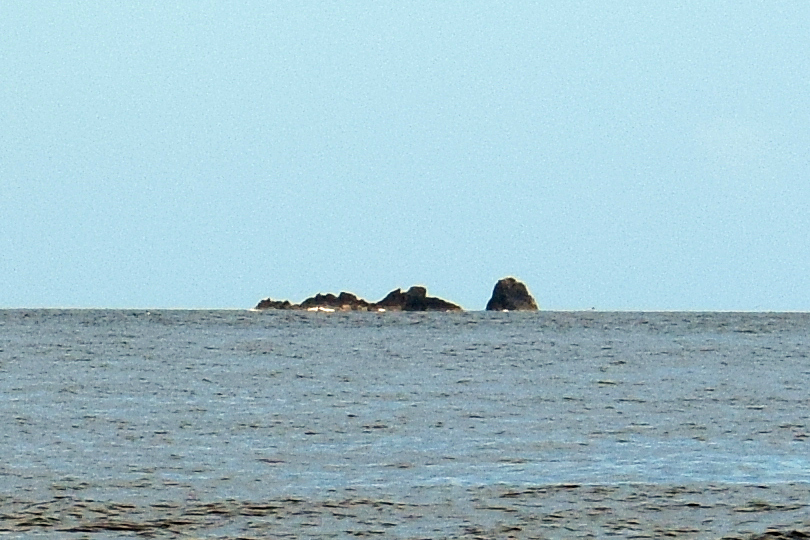
- Fradinhos seen from the Cabras Islets

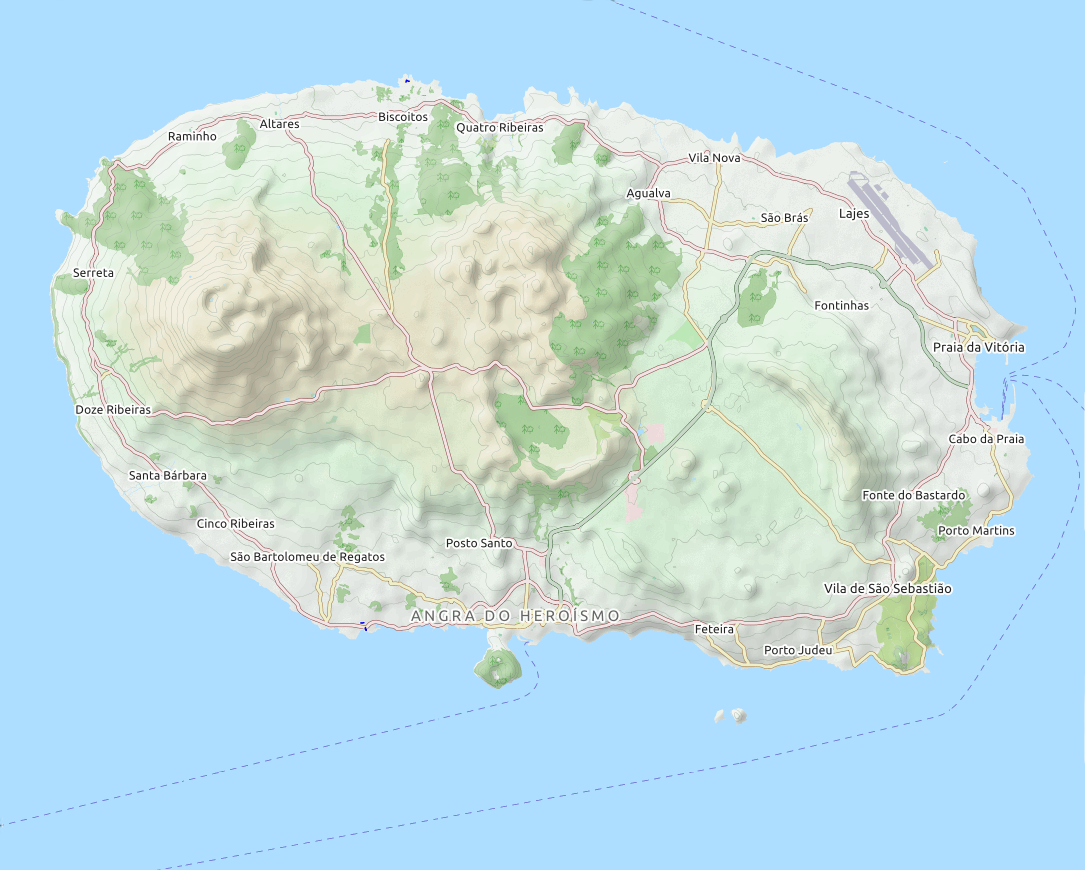
- Location of the islet group off the coast of Terceira
- Etymology: "Os Fradinhos" is Portuguese for "the little friars"

Geography
- Location: Atlantic Ocean
- Coordinates: 38°36′07″N 27°06′06″W

Administration
- Portugal
- Autonomous region: Azores

Demographics
- Population: uninhabited

The Fradinhos (Portuguese: Os Fradinhos; literally, The Little Friars) is an unvegetated, uninhabited islet group composed of four distinct escarpments located off the southeast coast of the island of Terceira in the Portuguese archipelago of the Azores.

== Geography ==
The Fradinhos are located off the coast of Terceira, approximately 2.1 nautical miles (3.9 km; 2.4 mi) off of Porto Judeu and 9 nautical miles (17 km; 10 mi) from Angra do Heroísmo. The four exposed rock formations are the basaltic tops of a submarine volcanic cone, heavily eroded by the sea and frequently immersed completely by waves during inclement weather. As such, the rocks only reach between 4 and 8 metres (13 and 26 ft) above sea level.

However, the Fradinhos are part of larger rock formations which slope up to sea level rather steeply from the surrounding ocean floor. The underwater environment in the area is characterized by lava flows with various caverns, slopes, and fractures—all eroded by the sea over time—which is typical in the volcanically-formed Azores.

=== Biome ===
The zone around Fradinhos is biodiverse, with more than 100 identified species. Its waters are home to Azores chromis (Chromis limbata), barred hogfish, black corals, groupers, Mediterranean parrotfish (Sparisoma cretense), red scorpionfish (Scorpaena scrofa), oysters, slipper lobsters (family Scyllaridae), and European spider crab (Maja squinado). The area also supports pelagic fish such as barracuda, bluefish, longfin yellowtail, and Chilean devil ray. Though the exposed surfaces of the Fradinhos are not vegetated by terrestrial plants, the underwater surfaces are home to various algae including the red alga Asparagopsis armata.

The Fradinhos offer excellent visibility for scuba diving. However, due to their location in open ocean relatively far off the coast, strong currents, and caverns up to 30 metres (98 ft) deep, only experienced divers should attempt a visit. By boat it takes approximately 20 minutes to reach Fradinhos from Angra do Heroísmo, or 35 minutes from Praia da Vitória.
