= Historical Institute of Terceira =

Historical society in Azores, Portugal

- Instituto Histórico da Ilha Terceira
- Formation: 1942
- Founder: Dr. Luís da Silva Ribeiro, first president of IHIT
- Headquarters: Ladeira de São Francisco 9, 9700-181 Angra do Heroísmo
- Location: Portugal
- Coordinates: 38.656780°N 27.216635°W
- Website: www.ihit.pt/pt/

The Historical Institute of Terceira, or literally the Historical Institute of the Island of Terceira (Portuguese: Instituto Histórico da Ilha Terceira), or IHIT, is a private association and cultural institute and museum, dedicated to the investigation and studying of the islands of the Azores. The institute is headquartered in the classical Convent of São Francisco (Convent of Saint Francis of Assisi) in Angra do Heroísmo.

It was established by like-minded individuals in 1942, who founded that institute in order fill a gap in the archipelago's legal charter, the Estatuto dos Distritos Autónomos das ilhas Adjacentes (1940–47). The district services outlined in this document did not include provisions for cultural elaboration and development, but rather promoted economic intervention in agriculture, public works, industry, energy and terrestrial transport, as well as at least one social issue: public health. It was pioneering for the Azores, and would spawn the creation of the Instituto Cultural de Ponta Delgada (English: Cultural Institute of Ponta Delgada) and, a few years later, the Núcleo Cultural da Horta (English: Cultural Nucleus of Horta).

== History ==
The creation of the institute was led by Luís Ribeiro and José Agostinho, both public educators with vocations in ethnography, history and natural sciences, and who were influenced by the Instituto de Coimbra, as well as other Portuguese and international societies. From this centre, a small academy developed, attracting many members, both locally and by correspondence, in addition to many Portuguese honorary members.

In 1985, its constitution was reformulated in order to adapt the association to the new reality, that abandoned the district system in favor of the autonomy model in the Azores.

The institute has promoted several colloquies reflecting important subjects in Azorean society, including: Os Açores e o Atlântico (a conference which began in 1983, and later continued in 1987, 1990 and 1993); Os Impérios do Espírito Santo e a Simbólica do Império (1984); and Uma Reflexão Sobre Portugal (1994). In 1995, a national congress was held on the contributions of Henry the Navigator to Azores history. Recently, the institute has been involved in the protection and valourization of historical buildings and monuments in the Autonomous Region of the Azores. This has included the process to designate the Historic Centre of Angra do Heroísmo as a UNESCO World Heritage site (1981–1983), the diffusion of international texts on the preservation of historical buildings and many collaborative efforts between the Institute and the Regional Secretariat of Education and Culture (Portuguese: Secretaria Regional de Educação e Cultura).

== Publications ==
It publishes an annual bulletin that includes fundamental studies of the history, ethnography and documents of cultural interest relative to the Azores. Further, it has been a publisher of larger works that are larger in scope and provide detailed examinations of society in the Azores. These have included: Ilha Terceira: Notas Etnográficas by Frederico Lopes Jr. (1980), Obras by Luís Ribeiro (three volumes, published in 1982), The Image of the Azorean by Mary T. Vermette (1984), Ruas da Cidade e outros escritos by Henrique Bras (1985), Os Açores e o Domínio Filipino by Avelino Freitas de Meneses (two volumes published in 1987), 'Tradições e Festas Populares da Freguesia dos Altares by Inocêncio Enes (1988), Apontamentos para a História dos Açores by Francisco Ferreira Drummond (text and transcription of the manuscript by José Guilherme Reis Leite, 1990).

The most ambitious publication of the institute was Fenix Angrence by Manuel Luís Maldonado, with edition and manuscript transcription by Helder Parreira de Sousa Lima (first volume in 1989, second in 1990 and the third and final volume in 1998).
