= António, Prior of Crato =

Disputed king of Portugal in 1580

António
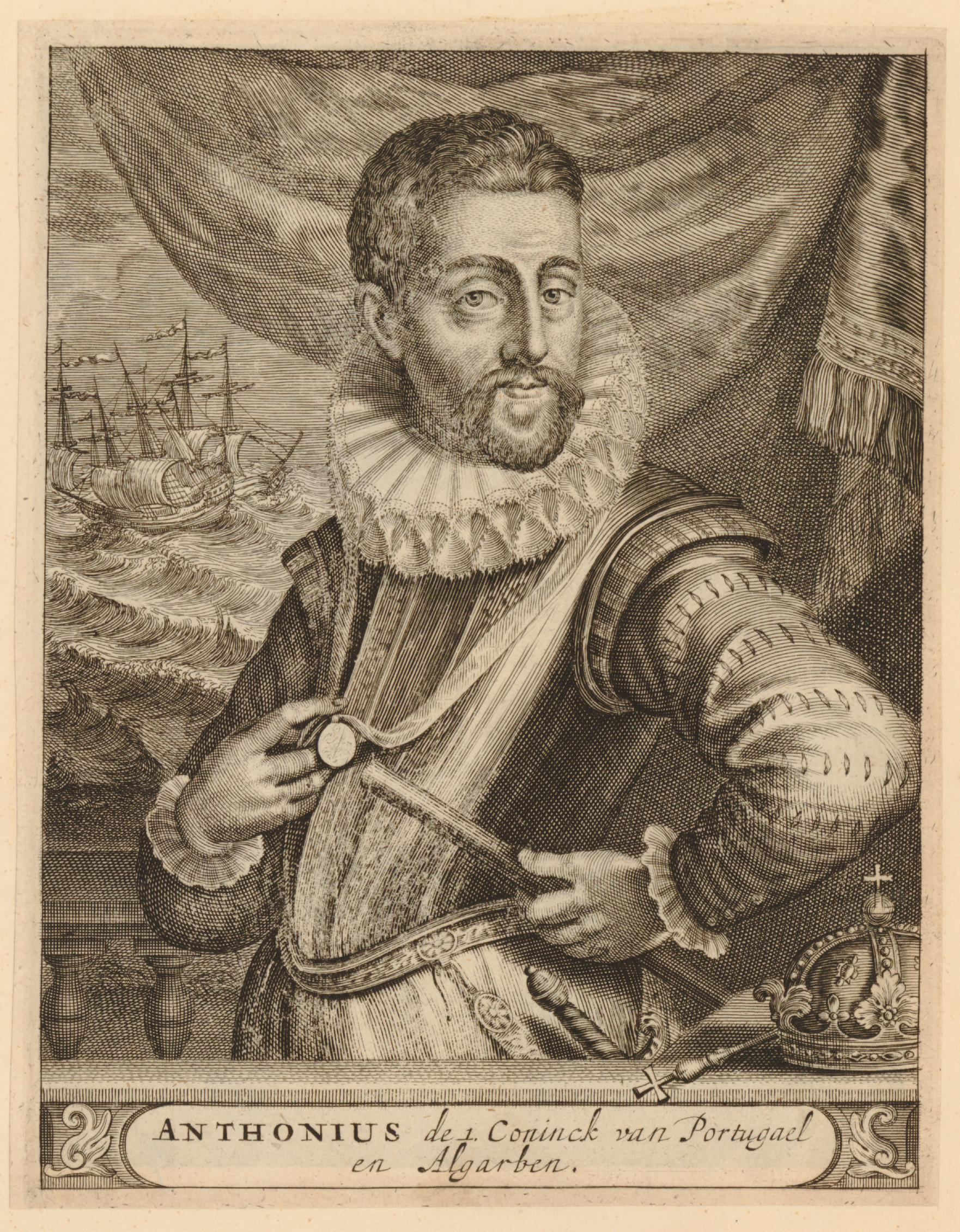
- Portrait, 1595

King of Portugal (disputed)
- Reign: 24 July 1580 – 25 August 1580
- Acclamation: 24 July 1580, Santarém
- Predecessor: Henry
- Successor: Philip I
- Born: 1531; Lisbon, Portugal
- Died: 26 August 1595 (aged 63–64); Paris, France
- Issue: See Descendants
- House: Aviz
- Father: Louis, Duke of Beja
- Mother: Violante Gomes
- Religion: Roman Catholicism

António, Prior of Crato (Anglicized: Anthony,European Portuguese pronunciation: [ɐ̃ˈtɔni.u, ɐ̃ˈtɔnju]; 1531 – 26 August 1595), sometimes called "The Determined", "The Fighter", "The Independentist" or "The Resistant", was a grandson of King Manuel I of Portugal who claimed the Portuguese throne during the 1580 dynastic crisis. According to some historians, he was King of Portugal for 33 days in 1580. Philip II of Spain prevailed in the succession struggle, but António claimed the throne until 1583. He was a disciple of Bartholomew of Braga.

== Early life ==
António was born in Lisbon, the illegitimate son of Prince Luis, Duke of Beja (1506–1555) and Violante Gomes (some sources argue that his parents were later married, perhaps at Évora). His mother may have been of Sephardic Jewish extraction, as many Portuguese sources maintain, or possibly of "new Christian" (a convert of Jewish or Muslim origin) extraction. At least one source says she was a member of the minor Portuguese nobility, the daughter of Pedro Gomes from Évora. She died a nun at Santarém on 16 July 1568.

António was educated in Coimbra, and he was placed in the Order of St. John. He received the wealthy priory of Crato as a benefice. In 1571, he was named governor of the Portuguese fortification at Tangiers in Morocco.

Nonetheless, little is known of his life until 1578. In that year, he accompanied King Sebastian of Portugal (1557–1578) in his invasion of Morocco, and he was taken prisoner by the Moors at the Battle of Alcácer Quibir, the same battle where the young king was slain. António is said to have secured his release on easy terms by concocting a fiction. He was asked the meaning of the cross of St. John that he wore on his doublet, and he replied that it was the sign of a small benefice which he held from the Pope, something he would lose if he were not back in Portugal by 1 January 1579. His captor, believing him to be a poor man, allowed his release upon payment of a small ransom.

== Claimant ==
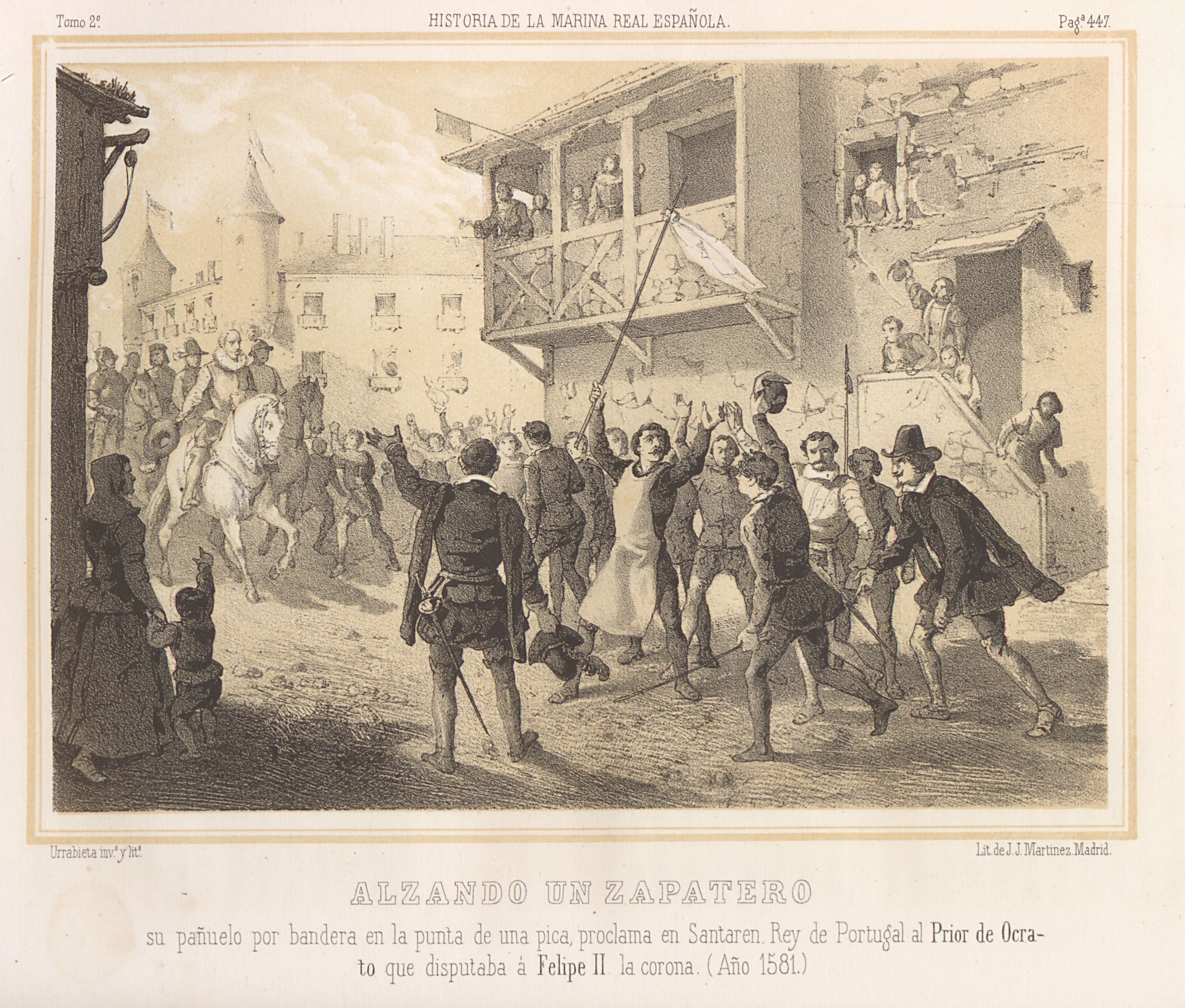
Acclamation of António, Prior of Crato as King of Portugal in Santarém, 1581.

While António was a prisoner in Morocco, his uncle Henry, the cardinal archbishop of Évora and only surviving brother of King John III of Portugal (1521–1557), was proclaimed the new monarch. The cardinal was the last legitimate Portuguese male representative of the royal line, he was old and, as a Cardinal and Bishop of the Roman Catholic Church, unable to have legitimate children. Consequently, the succession became the one overwhelming issue of this short reign.

According to the Portuguese cognatic custom of primogeniture, where males are given precedence, the oldest living male child of the king is proclaimed the legitimate successor. On the death of King Sebastião in Morocco, the line of King John III, eldest son of King Manuel I, was extinguished. Manuel's next son, the Duke of Beja, had had only António as a son, due to whose illegitimacy the throne had passed to Manuel's third son, Henry. Manuel had had three more children with issue - the Duke of Guimarães, who had two surviving daughters married, respectively, to the Duke of Braganza and the Duke of Parma; the Infanta Isabella, married to Charles V, mother of Philip II; and, the Infanta Beatrix, married to the Duke of Savoy.

The succession was contested by a number of claimants, only three of whom are of note. Philip II of Spain had the strongest claim, both as the eldest grandson of King Manuel I by his eldest daughter, Isabella, and through his deceased wife, the Infanta Maria Manuela, eldest daughter of King John III, who had been Heir Presumptive to the Portuguese throne from her birth until 1535. His claim was also backed-up by his position of power, access to an army and a ready availability of gold. His cousin, Catherine, Duchess of Braganza, was also a granddaughter of Manuel I, by her father the Infante Duarte, Duke of Guimarães, and was by this time the only legitimate Portuguese member of the royal family. Although both had strong claims to the throne, neither was ideal - Philip was effectively Spanish and Catherine was a woman - although these characteristics posed no legal limitation in and of themselves. Conversely, António as a bastard son of a Portuguese Prince had no legal claim to the throne. Cardinal Henry was torn between the two former claimants, dismissing António, albeit tending towards Philip II given the latter's assurances that Portugal would retain formal independence as well as autonomous administration of both its European territory and its empire.

In January 1580, the Portuguese Cortes were assembled in Almeirim to decide the question of the succession. Unfortunately, old Cardinal-King Henry died without having designated a successor. The regency of the kingdom was then assumed by a governing junta composed of five members, with the Cortes increasingly leaning towards Philip II, given Catherine's limited support, particularly following her uncle's death. Paradoxically, it would be her grandson, King John IV of Portugal, who would restore full Portuguese independence from the Habsburg monarchs 60 years later.

António endeavoured to prove that his father and mother were married after his birth, but no evidence of the alleged marriage was ever presented, and relied upon popular hostility to a Spanish ruler to present himself as an alternative candidate to King Philip II. Although his claim was not supported by two of the three arms of the cortes (the nobility and the church), who supported either Catherine or, increasingly, Philip, his support was drawn instead from the lower clergy (such as Anthony of Sienna), the peasantry, and artisans. He compared the situation to the 1383-1385 Crisis, pushing for an election of the king by the Cortes as for the Master of Aviz (John), illegitimate son of King Peter I of Portugal, who claimed his rights to the throne that ended in victory in the Battle of Aljubarrota and in the Cortes of Coimbra in 1385. The question of illegitimacy in 1580, however, was viewed very differently from 200 years earlier, underlined by the precedent of the Duke of Coimbra, only surviving son of King John II.

Philip ensured the success of his claim to the Portuguese crown by threatening to use his significant military power, buying support with gold from the Americas, and by convincing the Cortes of the future benefits to a struggling Portuguese economy from the personal union of the two crowns, while maintaining Portugal's independence.

== King ==
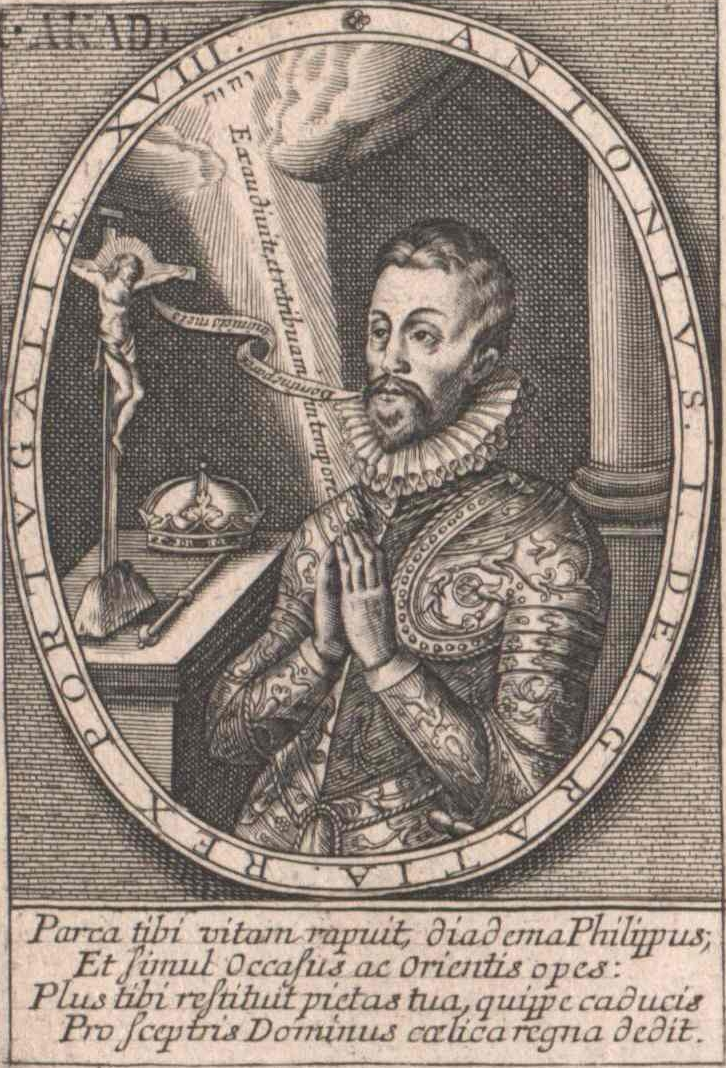
Engraving depicting António I as King of Portugal

On 19 July 1580, António was acclaimed King of Portugal in Santarém by his supporters, followed by popular acclamation in Lisbon and other towns. This was the excuse Philip II required to push his army into Portugal. Antonio was never formally acclaimed by the Cortes and governed in Continental Portugal for only 20 days. António and his supporters were decisively defeated in the Battle of Alcântara by the Spanish Habsburg armies led by Fernando Álvarez de Toledo, Duke of Alba on 25 August.

He then attempted to rule Portugal from the island of Terceira, in the archipelago of the Azores, where he established an opposition government that lasted until 1583, and where he even minted coin — a typical act of sovereignty and royalty. His rule was recognized only in the Azores where his supporters, such as Ciprião de Figueiredo and Violante de Canto, were able to organize a resistance. Meanwhile, on the continent and in the Madeira Islands, power was exercised by Philip II, who was officially recognized as king the following year in the Portuguese Cortes of Tomar.

== Exile ==
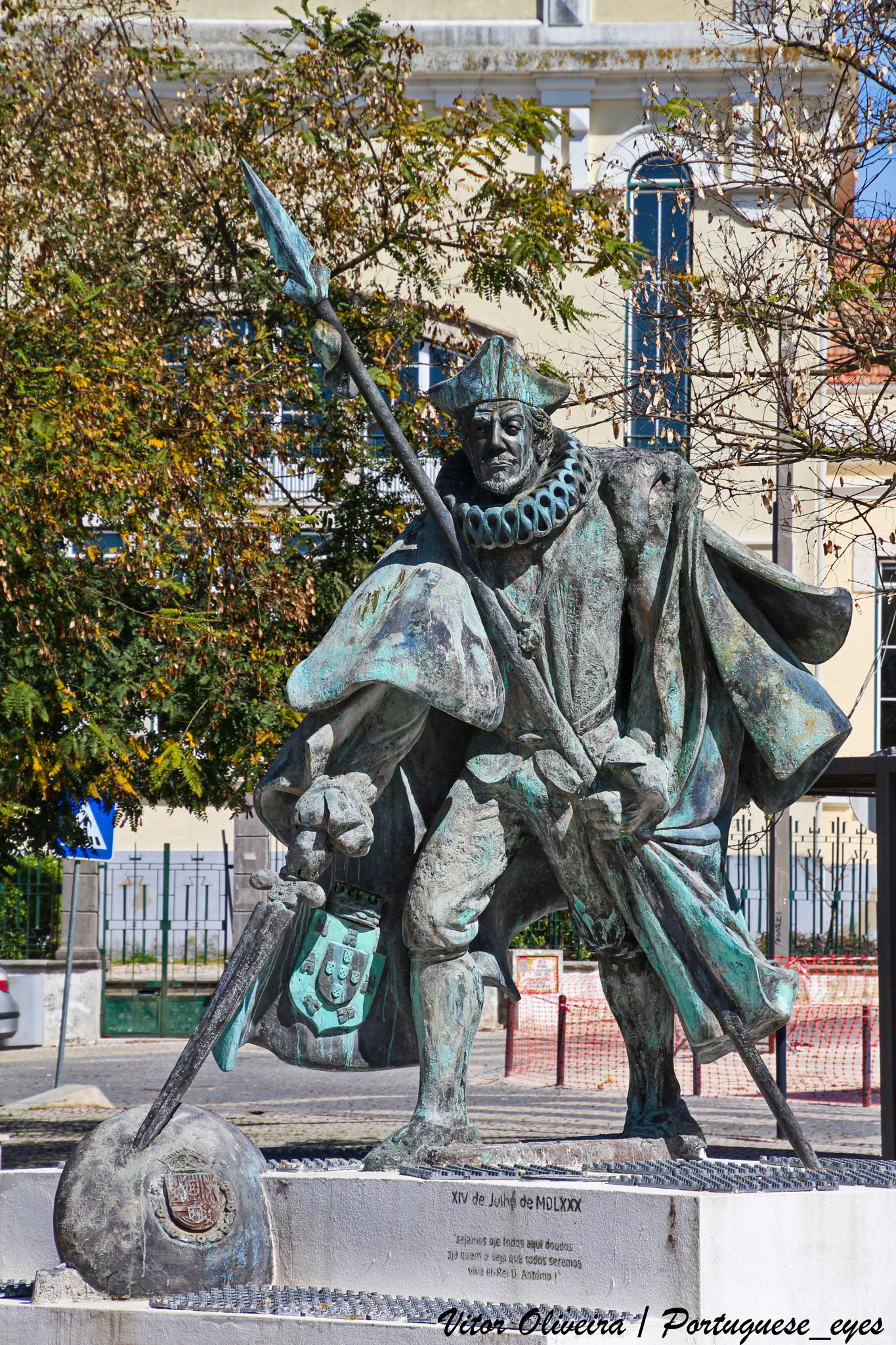
Monument to António I in Santarém.

In early 1581, António fled to France carrying the Portuguese Crown Jewels, including many valuable diamonds. He was well received by Catherine de' Medici, who also had a claim to the Crown of Portugal. She looked upon him as a convenient instrument to be used against Philip II. By promising to cede the Portuguese colony of Brazil to her and the sale of some of his jewels, António secured support to fit out a fleet.

As the Habsburgs had not yet occupied the Azores, he sailed for them with a number of French adventurers under Philip Strozzi, a Florentine exile in the service of France, but was utterly defeated at sea by the Álvaro de Bazán, 1st Marquis of Santa Cruz at the Battle of Ponta Delgada, off the coast of the island of São Miguel between 25 and 26 July 1582. He then returned to France and lived for a time in Rueil near Paris: fear of assassins, employed by Philip II, drove António from one refuge to another until he finally went to England.

Queen Elizabeth I of England favoured him for much the same reasons as Catherine de' Medici did. In 1589, the year after the Spanish Armada, he accompanied an English expedition, under the command of Francis Drake and John Norreys, to the coast of Spain and Portugal. The force consisted partly of the queen's ships, and partly of privateers who joined in search of booty. António, with all the credulity of an exile, believed that his presence would provoke a general rising against Philip II. However, none took place and the expedition was a costly failure.

== Later life ==
António soon fell into poverty. His remaining diamonds were disposed of by degrees. The last and finest was acquired by Nicholas Harlai, Seigneur de Sancy, from whom it was purchased by Maximilien de Béthune, duc de Sully. It was later included among the jewels of the crown of France. During his last days, António lived as a private gentleman on a small pension given by King Henry IV of France. He died in Paris on 26 August 1595, and was buried in the middle of the choir of the convent church of the Franciscan Observantists (Cordeliers). The church was demolished in 1811. He left nine illegitimate sons by three different women. In addition to papers which he published to defend his claims, António was the author of the Panegyrus Alphonsi Lusitanorum Regis (Coimbra 1550), and of a cento of the Psalms, Psalmi Confessionales (Paris 1592), which was translated into English under the title of The Royal Penitent by Francis Chamberleyn (London 1659), and into German as Heilige Betrachtungen (Marburg, 1677).

== Ancestry ==
Ancestors of António, Prior of Crato

8. Infante Fernando, Duke of Viseu
4. Manuel I of Portugal
9. Infanta Beatrice of Portugal
2. Infante Louis, Duke of Beja
10. Ferdinand II of Aragon
5. Maria of Aragon and Castile
11. Isabella I of Castile
1. António, Prior of Crato
6. Pedro Gomes
3. Violante Gomes

== Descendants ==
António left several children – all born from gallant adventures, as he never married. Celibacy was, in fact, one of the obligations of the Knights Hospitaller.

Name	Birth	Death	Notes
Manuel de Portugal	1568 in Tangier	22 June 1638 in Brussels	Accompanied his father in the exile in France, England and Flanders. Married Emilia of Nassau, daughter of William the Silent.
Cristóvão de Portugal	April 1573 in Tangier	3 June 1638 in Paris	After his father's death continued to fight for his cause.
Dinis de Portugal	?	?	Cistercian monk.
João de Portugal	?	?	Died young.
Filipa de Portugal	?	?	Nun at the Monastery of Lorvão.
Luísa de Portugal	?	?	Nun in Tordesillas.

== See also ==
- War of the Portuguese Succession
- 1580 Portuguese succession crisis

== Sources ==
- Livermore, H.V. (1976). A New History of Portugal. Cambridge University Press.
- MacKay, Ruth (2012). The Baker Who Pretended to Be King of Portugal. University of Chicago Press.
- António is frequently mentioned in French, English, and Spanish state papers of the time. A life of him, attributed to Gomes Vasconcellos de Figueiredo, was published in a French translation by Mme de Sainctonge in Amsterdam (1696). A modern account of him, Un prétendant portugais au XVI siècle, by M. Fournier (Paris, 1852), is based on authentic sources. See also Dom Antonio Prior de Crato-notas de bibliographia, by J. de Araújo (Lisbon, 1897).
- Bento, Carlos Melo (2008), História dos Açores: Da descoberta a 1934 (in Portuguese), Ponta Delgada (Azores), Portugal: Câmara Municipal de Ponta Delgada

António, Prior of Crato House of Aviz Cadet branch of the House of Burgundy Born: 1531 Died: 26 August 1595
Regnal titles
Preceded by Henry	King of Portugal and the Algarves; 1580 (settled in Portugal); 1580–1581 (settled in the Azores Islands)	Succeeded by Philip I
Titles in pretence
Habsburg succession	— TITULAR — King of Portugal and the Algarves; Aviz claimant 1581–1595	Succeeded by Teodósio
