= Vila de São Sebastião =

- Civil parish
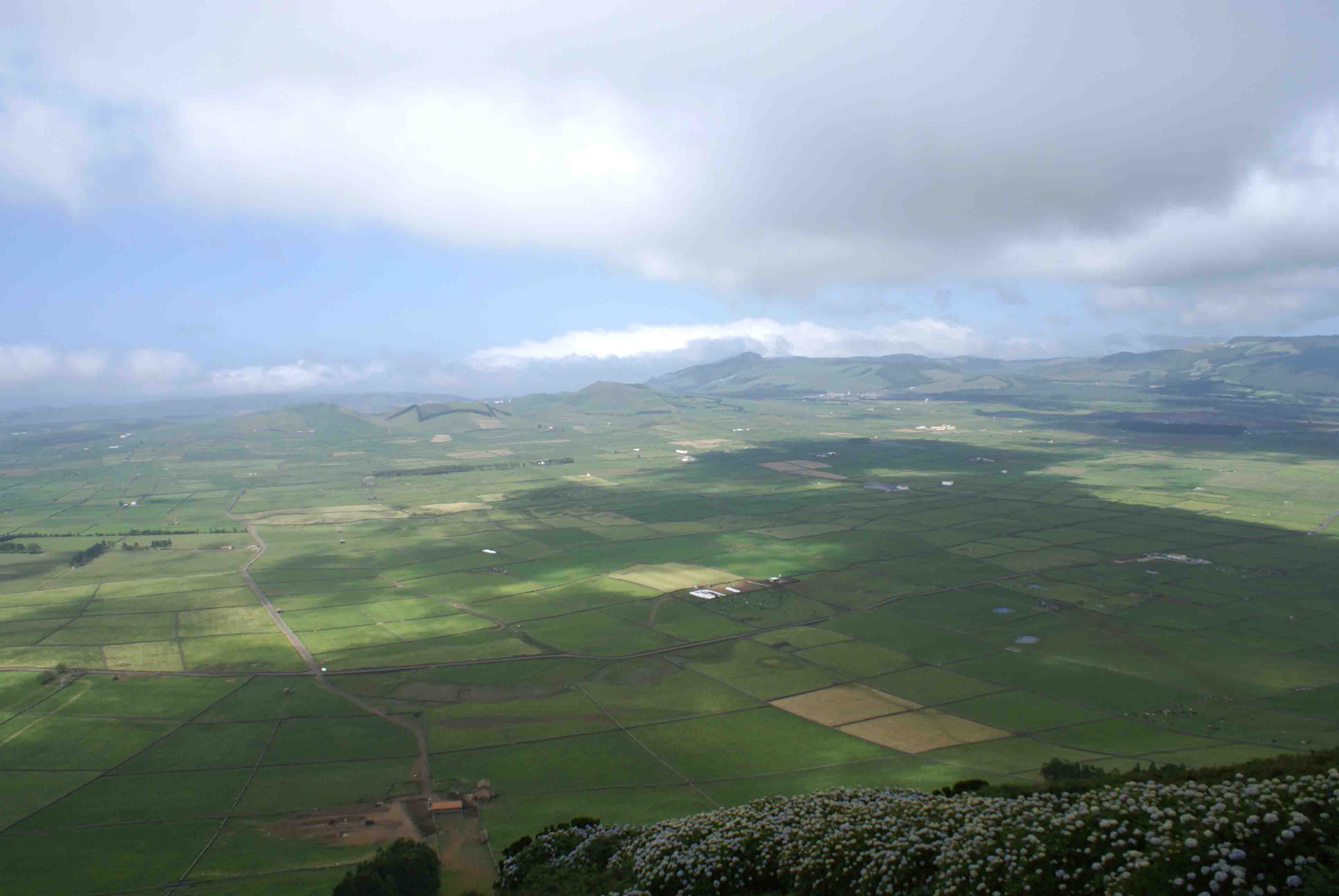
- The Achada Plain, the remnants of the Guilherme Moniz crater within the parish of São Sebastião

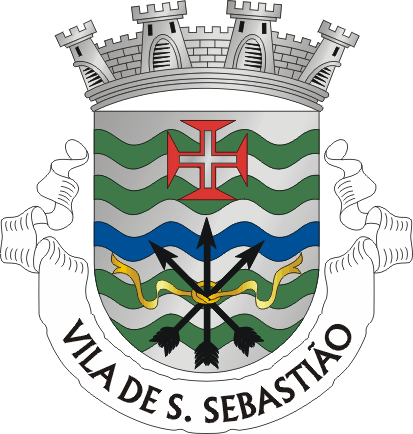
- Coat of arms

- Location in the Azores Vila de São Sebastião (Terceira)
- Coordinates: 38°39′56″N 27°5′28″W
- Country: Portugal
- Auton. region: Azores
- Island: Terceira
- Municipality: Angra do Heroísmo
- Established: Settlement: fl. 1500; Town: 23 March 1503; Civil parish: 24 October 1855

Area
  - Total: 23.93 km^{2} (9.24 sq mi)
- Elevation: 149 m (489 ft)

Population (2011)
  - Total: 2,096
  - Density: 87.59/km^{2} (226.9/sq mi)
- Time zone: UTC−01:00 (AZOT)
  - Summer (DST): UTC+00:00 (AZOST)
- Postal code: 9700-613
- Area code: 295
- Patron: São Sebastião

Vila de São Sebastião, commonly shortened to São Sebastião (Portuguese for Saint Sebastian), is a civil parish in the municipality of Angra do Heroísmo, on the island of Terceira in the Portuguese archipelago of the Azores. The population in 2011 was 2,096, in an area of 23.93 square kilometres (9.24 sq mi). It is in the southeastern part of the island of Terceira. It contains the localities Arrabalde, Boavista, Cavalas, Canada da Salga, Contendas, Cruz, Maria Vieira, Ribeira Seca de Cima, Ribeira Seca de Baixo, Salgueiros and Vila de São Sebastião.

== History ==
The history of the parish is tied to the early settlement of Terceira. A year after the Infante Henry the Navigator signed a charter on 21 March 1450 in Silves to pass the donatorio of the island to the Flemish nobleman Jacome de Bruges, the nobleman made for Terceira, where he disembarked along the southeast shoreline of the island, in an area called Pesqueiro dos Meninos. But, as Francisco Ferreira Drummond later indicated, "that they established themselves a league away, on a vast and appreciable field, that they called Porta Alegre, constructing a small church to the invocation of Santa Ana, the first and only church on the island, where were annexed the chapels of Santo António do Porto Judeu and São Pedro da Ribeirinha...". Drummond later added that these early settlers moved so far to avoid impending conflicts with Spain, in which Portugal was commonly active.

This areas was the oldest demographic centre by the time that Jácome de Bruges left Porta Alegre in 1456 to launch another settlement in Praia. By this time a second place, Ribeira de Frei João was already inhabited by a nascent community. The discovery of a marble slab with inscriptions by Drummond and local inhabitants in 1780 imply that the parochial church of São Sebastião was established in 1480. Although the early church of Sant'Ana da Portalegre das Quatro Ribeiras was constructed some time after early settlement, the construction of a temple in the locality of Ribeira de Frei João was almost immediate.

King Manuel I in a charter dated 23 March 1503 elevated the local community to the status of Vila (town) and seat of the municipality (which included the parishes of Porto Judeu and the locality of Raminho, which for a time pertained to the ecclesiastical parish of Altares). At this time, owing to the Church's patron saint being Saint Sebastian, the new municipality was renamed São Sebastião.

In 1836, Francisco Ferreira Drummond fought against the idea of dissolving the old municipality and merging it into Angra do Heroísmo. On April 1, 1870, São Sebastião became part of Angra do Heroísmo and changed its name to Vila de São Sebastião.

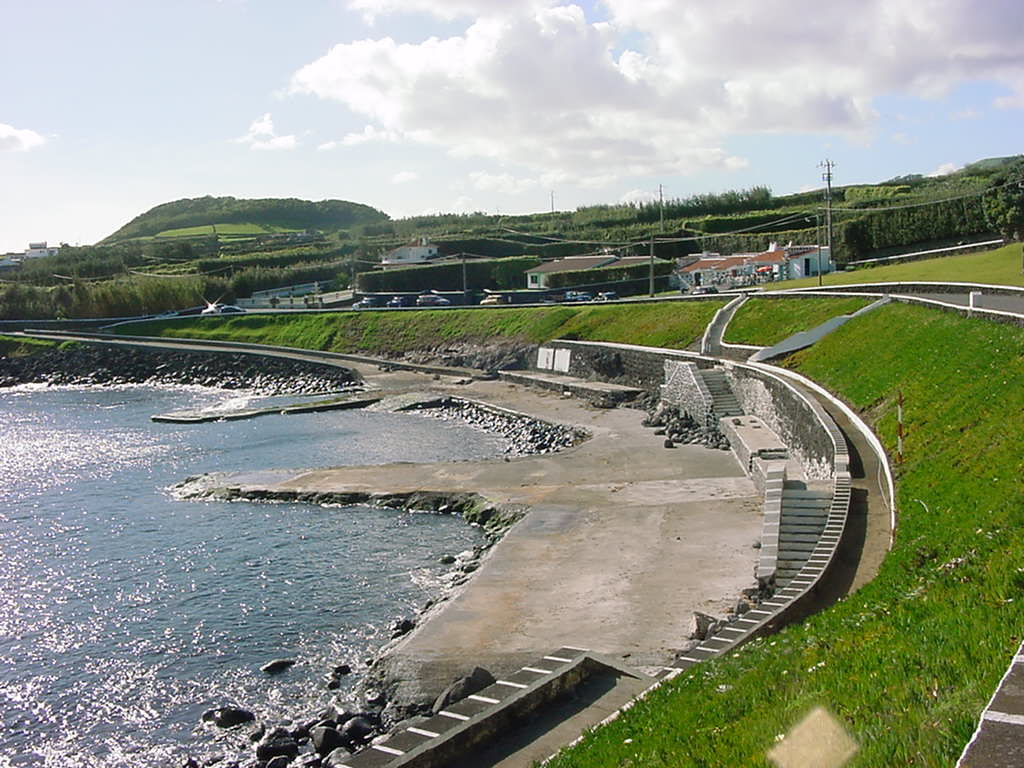
Salga Bay

== Architecture ==
=== Civic ===
- Fountain of Santa Ana (Portuguese: Fontanário Armoreado do Rossio/Fonte de Santa Ana)
- Lighthouse of Ponta das Contendas (Portuguese: Farol de Ponta das Contendas), located on the southeast coast of the parish, the lighthouse is an H-shaped structure used to protect this region as a navigational aid; its plan was initiated in 1882, but nonetheless, its construction only began in 1930, becoming operational on 1 February 1934.

=== Military ===
- Fort of Greta (Portuguese: Forte de Greta), a 16th century fort that protected the southern coast, working in conjunction with the Fort of Santa Catarina de Mós. For many years it was used to defend the territory from pirate raids, until the end of the 19th century, when it fell into ruin.

=== Religious ===
- Chapel of the Misericórdia of São Sebastião (Portuguese: Capela da Misericórdia de São Sebastião e Casa de Francisco Ferreira Drumond), a chapel and shelter erected by the Misericórdia in the 16th century, it later became the home of the historian Francisco Ferreira Drummond until his death.
- Church of Santa Ana (Portuguese: Capela de Santa Ana/Ermida de Santa Ana/Igreja de Santa Ana),
- Church of São Sebastião (Portuguese: Igreja Paroquial de São Sebastião/Igreja de São Sebastião)
- Império of the Holy Spirit of São Sebastião (Portuguese: Império do Espírito Santo de São Sebastião)

== Notable citizens ==
- Francisco Ferreira Drummond (21 January 1796 - 11 September 1858), a Portuguese writer, historian and politician who fought against the extinction of the former municipality of São Sebastião, as well as author of the Annals of the island of Terceira.
