= House of Braganza =

Portuguese dynasty

Most Serene House of Braganza Sereníssima Casa de Bragança
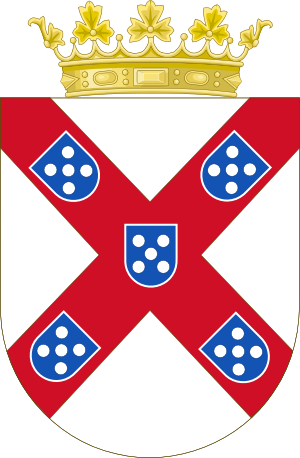
- Coat of arms of the House of Braganza.
- Parent house: Portuguese House of Burgundy by way of the House of Aviz
- Country: Kingdom of Portugal; Empire of Brazil; United Kingdom of Portugal, Brazil and the Algarves
- Founded: 30 December 1442; 583 years ago
- Founder: Afonso I, Duke of Braganza
- Current head: Duarte Pio, Duke of Braganza
- Final ruler: United Kingdom of Portugal, Brazil and the Algarves: John VI (1822) Kingdom of Portugal: Manuel II (1910) Empire of Brazil: Pedro II (1889)
- Titles: List: Emperor of Brazil; King of the United Kingdom of Portugal, Brazil and the Algarves; King of Portugal; King of Brazil; King of the Algarve; Prince Imperial of Brazil; Prince Royal of United Kingdom of Portugal, Brazil and the Algarves; Prince Royal of Portugal and the Algarves; Prince of Brazil; Prince of Beira; Prince of Grão-Pará; Prince of Brazil; Prince of Portugal; Infante of Portugal; Duke of Braganza; Duke of Guimarães; Duke of Barcelos; Duke of Porto; Duke of Beja; Dukes of Viseu; Duke of Coimbra; Marquis of Vila Viçosa; Marquis of Valença; Marquis of Montemor-o-Novo; Marquis of Frechilla and Villarramiel; Count of Guimarães; Count of Barcelos; Count of Arraiolos; Count of Ourém; Count of Neiva; Count of Faro; Count of Faria
- Deposition: Kingdom of Portugal: 1910 Implementation of the Republic Empire of Brazil: 1889 Proclamation of the Republic
- Cadet branches: Agnatic: House of Lafões; House of Valença; House of Cadaval; House of Melo de Portugal; House of Carvalho and Saldanha; Non-agnatic: House of Bourbon-Braganza (Spain); House of Braganza-Saxe-Coburg and Gotha (Portugal); House of Orléans-Braganza (Brazil); House of Saxe-Coburg and Braganza (Brazil)

The Most Serene House of Braganza (Portuguese: Sereníssima Casa de Bragança), also known as the Brigantine dynasty (dinastia Brigantina), is a dynasty of emperors, kings, princes, and dukes of Portuguese origin which reigned in Europe and the Americas.

The house was founded by Afonso I, 1st Duke of Braganza, illegitimate son of King John I of Portugal of the House of Aviz, and would eventually grow into one of the wealthiest and most powerful noble houses of Iberia during the Renaissance period. The Braganzas came to rule the Kingdom of Portugal and the Algarves after successfully deposing the Philippine Dynasty in the Restoration War, resulting in the Duke of Braganza becoming King John IV of Portugal, in 1640. The Braganzas ruled Portugal and the Portuguese Empire from 1640 and with the creation of the United Kingdom of Portugal, Brazil and the Algarves, in 1815, and the subsequent independence of the Empire of Brazil, in 1822, the Braganzas came to rule as the monarchs of Brazil.

The House of Braganza produced 15 Portuguese monarchs and all four Brazilian monarchs, numerous consorts to various European kingdoms, such as Catherine of Braganza (wife of Charles II of England who introduced tea to Britain) and Maria Isabel of Braganza (wife of Ferdinand VII of Spain who founded the El Prado Museum), as well as sometime candidates for the thrones of Poland and Greece, Infante Manuel, Count of Ourém and Pedro, Duke of Braganza, respectively, and numerous other notable figures in the histories of Europe and the Americas. The Braganzas were deposed from their thrones in Europe and the Americas at the turn of the 19th–20th centuries, when Emperor Pedro II was deposed in Brazil, in 1889, and when King Manuel II was deposed in Portugal, in 1910.

== Feudal establishment ==
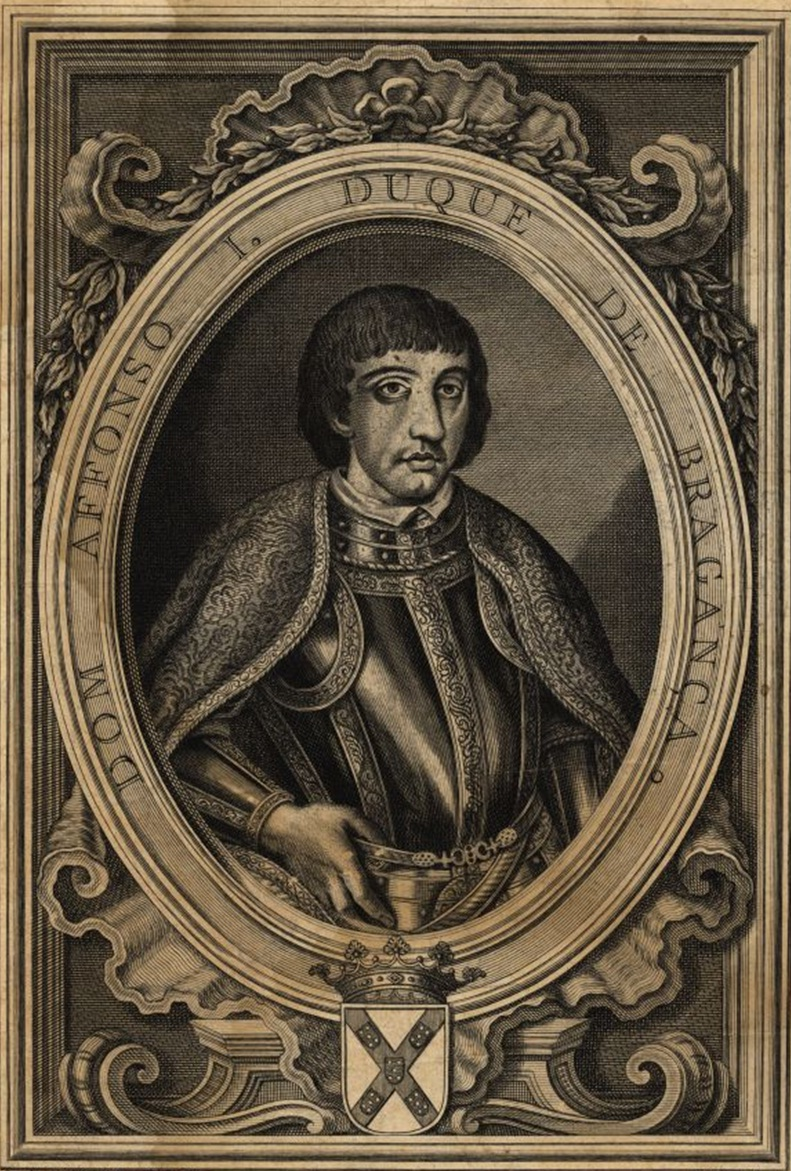
Afonso I, first Duke of Braganza and founder of the House of Braganza

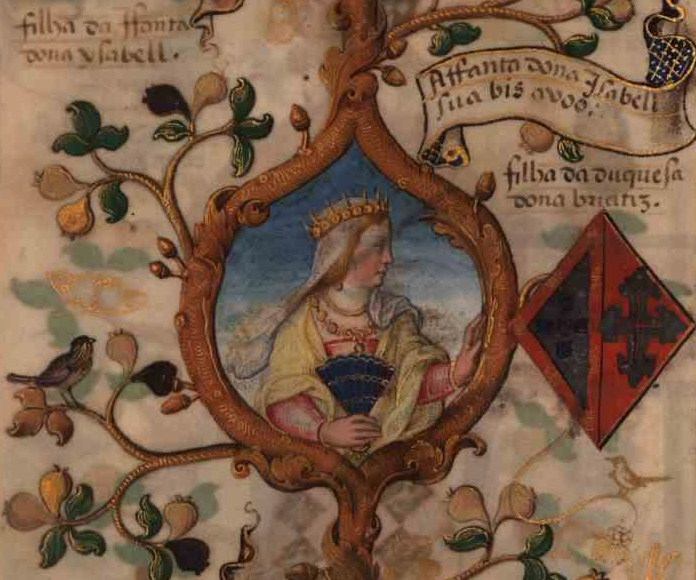
Isabel of Braganza was the first to intermarry with the royal family, as wife of Infante João, Constable of Portugal.

The House of Braganza originated with Afonso I, an illegitimate son of King John I of Portugal, founder of the House of Aviz, and Inês Pires. (Note: There is some controversy regarding the ancestry of Inês Pires (born in Borba, c. 1350). She was the daughter of Pedro Esteves (for that she is sometimes called Inês Pires Esteves) and Maria Anes ("Grande Enciclopédia Portuguesa e Brasileira", Editorial Enciclopédia, Lisboa, vol. 4, pp. 172; António Caetano de Sousa, "História Genealógica da Casa Real Portuguesa", Atlântida Ed., Coimbra, 1946, vol. 2, pp. 25). Some historians and genealogist claim that her father was a converso – a Jew converted to Catholicism (Augusto Soares d' Azevedo Barbosa de Pinho Leal, "Portugal Antigo e Moderno", Cota d' Armas, Lisboa, 1990; Isabel Violante Pereira, "De Mendo da Guarda a D. Manuel I", Livros Horizonte, Lisboa, 2001), while the majority of sources give her a long and well attested noble Christian ancestry (Felgueiras Gayo, "Nobiliário das Famílias de Portugal", Carvalhos de Basto, Braga, 1989).) Though Afonso was illegitimate, his father valued and cared for him a great deal, demonstrated by his arrangement of Afonso's marriage to Beatriz Pereira de Alvim, daughter of Nuno Álvares Pereira, Portugal's most important general and a personal friend of King John I. As well as increasing his social status by his marriage into a well-established house, Afonso was also ceded the title of Count of Barcelos.

With his newly consolidated place in the nobility of Portugal, Afonso commenced what would be a highly successful political and social career. In 1415 he took part in the Conquest of Ceuta, alongside his father, his brothers, and the leading members of the nobility and military. By the time of his father's death in 1433, Afonso had won favour with his brother, King Duarte I and the rest of high Portuguese society. With his brother's premature death in 1438, a regency was established for Afonso's nephew, the 6 year old King Afonso V, under the leadership of the king's mother, Leonor of Aragon, and later Afonso's brother, Infante Pedro, Duke of Coimbra. The Duke of Coimbra's regency, however, soon proved unpopular and Afonso quickly became the King's preferred advisor. On 30 December 1442, the Duke of Coimbra, still the King's regent and thus acting in his name, created Afonso as the Duke of Braganza, as a gesture of good will and reconciliation between the two brothers. Afonso's elevation to the dukedom, the highest level of nobility, marked the foundation of the House of Braganza, which was to become a key family in Portuguese history.

As a result of the hard work and success of Afonso I, his children all secured successful positions and lived privileged lives. Afonso I's first son, Afonso of Braganza, was a prominent member of the nobility, having been granted, by his grandfather, Nuno Álvares Pereira, the lucrative and powerful title of Count of Ourém, in 1422. He was an accomplished diplomat, and served as the king's representative at the Council of Basel in 1436, and the Council of Florence in 1439. In 1451, the Count of Ourém was made Marquis of Valença and escorted Infanta Leonor of Portugal to her husband Frederick III, Holy Roman Emperor. Later, in 1458, he participated in the capture and conquest of Alcácer-Ceguer. The Marquis of Valença, however, died in 1460, one year before his father and therefore did not succeed him. Afonso I's first daughter, Isabel of Braganza, married Infante João, Lord of Reguengos de Monsaraz, thus relinking the House of Braganza to the Royal House of Portugal. Isabel's strategic marriage proved successful, and produced four children, whose descendants would be some of the most important in Iberian history. Afonso I's last child and successor, Fernando I, Duke of Braganza, continued his legacy of prominence in the military and society.

When Fernando I was born, in 1403, his grandfather, Nuno Álvares Pereira, ceded him the title of Count of Arraiolos. Fernando became an accomplished military man, participating in various Portuguese imperial campaigns. Though Fernando I was a popular and powerful member of the nobility, he did not always find himself in the favour of the king, most notably exemplified when Fernando I openly declaimed King Duarte I, at the Portuguese Cortes, on the topic of the rescue and recovery of the King's brother, Infante Fernando, Lord of Salvaterra de Magos from the Moors. However, Fernando I became a favourite of both the royal and imperial government and of King Afonso V, earning him the position of Governor of Ceuta and the titles of Marquis of Vila Viçosa and Count of Neiva.

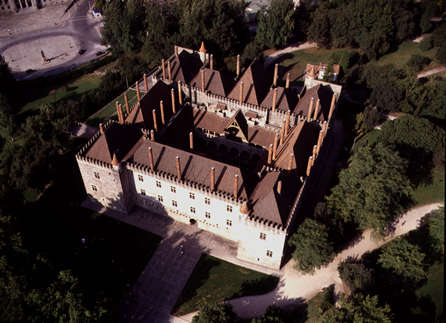
The Palace of the Dukes, in Guimarães, was seat of the House of Braganza from 1420 until Fernando II of Braganza was executed for treason by King João II in 1483.

Fernando I's children, by his wife, Joana de Castro, Lady of Cadaval, continued to enlarge the influence of the House of Braganza. Of his nine children, all six who survived to adulthood established themselves either through positions or marriages, though the actions of King João II would seek to weaken their influence. Fernando I's first son and successor, Fernando II, was initially a bright and popular nobleman, but his conflict with King João II would see his and the House's downfall. His second son, João of Braganza, 1st Marquis of Montemor-o-Novo, was an accomplished military man and was made Constable of Portugal. Fernando's third son, Afonso of Braganza, became a popular nobleman of society and was made 1st Count of Faro. The Duke's fourth son, Álvaro of Braganza, inherited the fiefs of his mother, becoming the 5th Lord of Ferreira, 4th Lord of Cadaval, and 1st Lord of Tentúgal. Fernando's eldest surviving daughter, Beatriz of Braganza, married Pedro de Meneses, 1st Marquis of Vila Real. Fernando's last surviving child, Guiomar of Braganza, married Henrique de Meneses, 4th Count of Viana do Alentejo. Ultimately, however, Fernando I's children and grandchildren would suffer great difficulty under the reign of King João II.

By the tenure of the third duke, Fernando II, the House of Braganza was undoubtedly one of the greatest noble houses of Portugal and Iberia as a whole. Fernando II continued the House's legacy of acquisition and gained the title of Duke of Guimarães. To the Duke and the House's downfall, however, King João II's reign concerned itself with the royal consolidation of power and the diminishment of the nobility. Fernando II, having been a prominent and powerful nobleman, was accused of treason and executed by King João II in 1483; the House's titles and properties were merged into the crown and its members exiled to Castile.

Due to their father's misfortunes, Fernando II's children, from his marriage to Isabel of Viseu, daughter of Infante Fernando, Duke of Viseu and Beja, initially had a tumultuous childhood; but King João II's successor, King Manuel I, who had previously himself been the Duke of Beja, chose to forgive the House and re-grant them all their properties in exchange for their loyalty. Fernando II's oldest surviving son and successor, Jaime I, returned to Portugal and reestablished himself at Vila Viçosa, the former seat of the Dukes. Fernando II's only other surviving son, Dinis of Braganza, married Beatriz de Castro Osório, Countess of Lemos, and had four children with her.

== Portuguese Renaissance ==
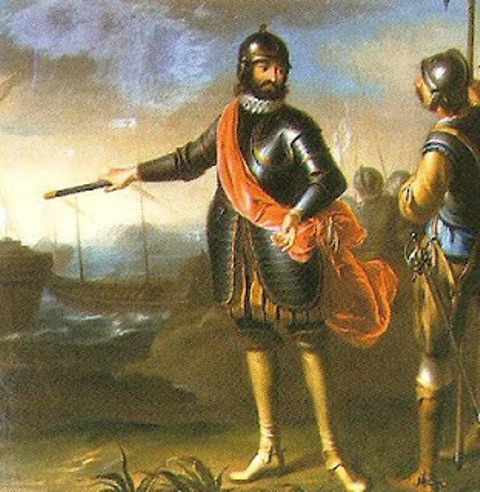
Jaime I restored the Braganzas' status after his father's execution and built the Ducal Palace of Vila Viçosa.

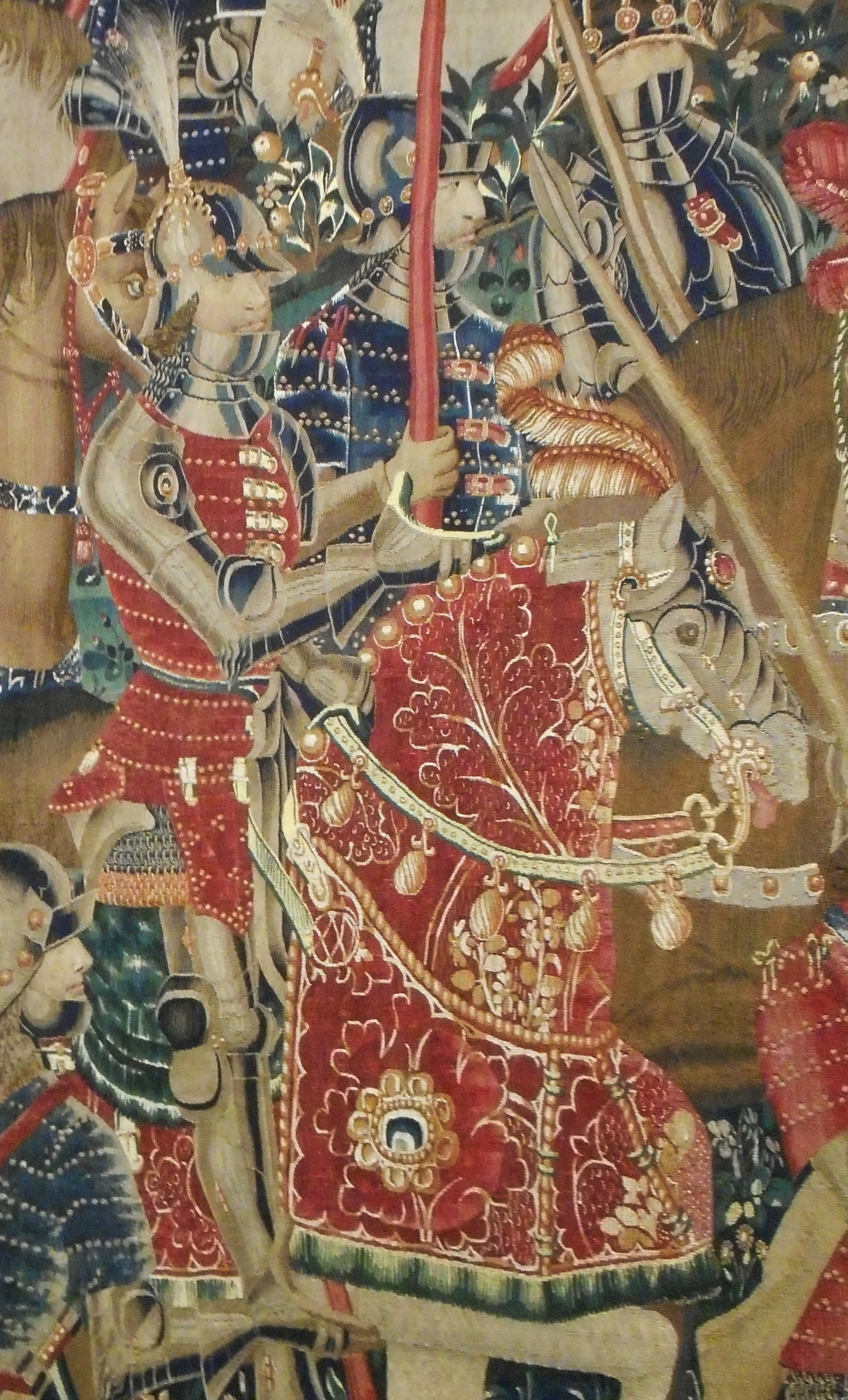
João of Braganza, Marquis of Montemor-o-Novo led the Portuguese conquest of Tangier in 1471.

Jaime I's tenure as Duke of Braganza was one of restoration and grandness. Upon his return to Portugal from exile, Jaime took possession of the House's formerly confiscated properties. In order to establish a new image for the House, he ordered the construction of a new seat for the House, which would become one of the largest palaces in Iberia, the Ducal Palace of Vila Viçosa. Jaime I's restoration also continued with the House's relations with the King, Jaime I having becoming a favourite of King Manuel I and even once his temporary heir. The Duke also had his share of scandal, having funded the conquest of the city of Azamor, for the royal crown as, as punishment for his ordering the murder of his first wife, Leonor Pérez de Guzman, daughter of Juan Alfonso Pérez de Guzmán, 3rd Duke of Medina Sidonia.

The children of Jaime I, both the two first children by his first wife, Leonor of Pérez de Guzman, and the later eight children by his second wife, Joana of Mendoça, all saw successful lives under the restored House of Braganza. Jaime I's first daughter, Isabel of Braganza, married Infante Duarte, Duke of Guimarães, and had three children, while his first son and successor, Teodósio I, was a successful prince of the Portuguese Renaissance. Five of Jaime I's children, Jaime, Maria, Fulgêncio, Teotónio, and Vicência, all entered into religious orders. The Duke's second daughter, Joana of Braganza, married Bernardino de Cardenas, 3rd Marquis of Elche, and his third daughter, Eugénia of Braganza, married Francisco de Melo, 2nd Marquis of Ferreira. Jaime I's only other son, other than Teodósio I, to not enter into the church, Constantino of Braganza, married Maria de Melo, daughter of D. Rodrigo de Melo, 1st Marquis of Ferreira, but had no children. Constantino was famed as a great officer of the Portuguese Empire, having served as the Viceroy of Portuguese India and Captain of Ribeira Grande, among other positions.

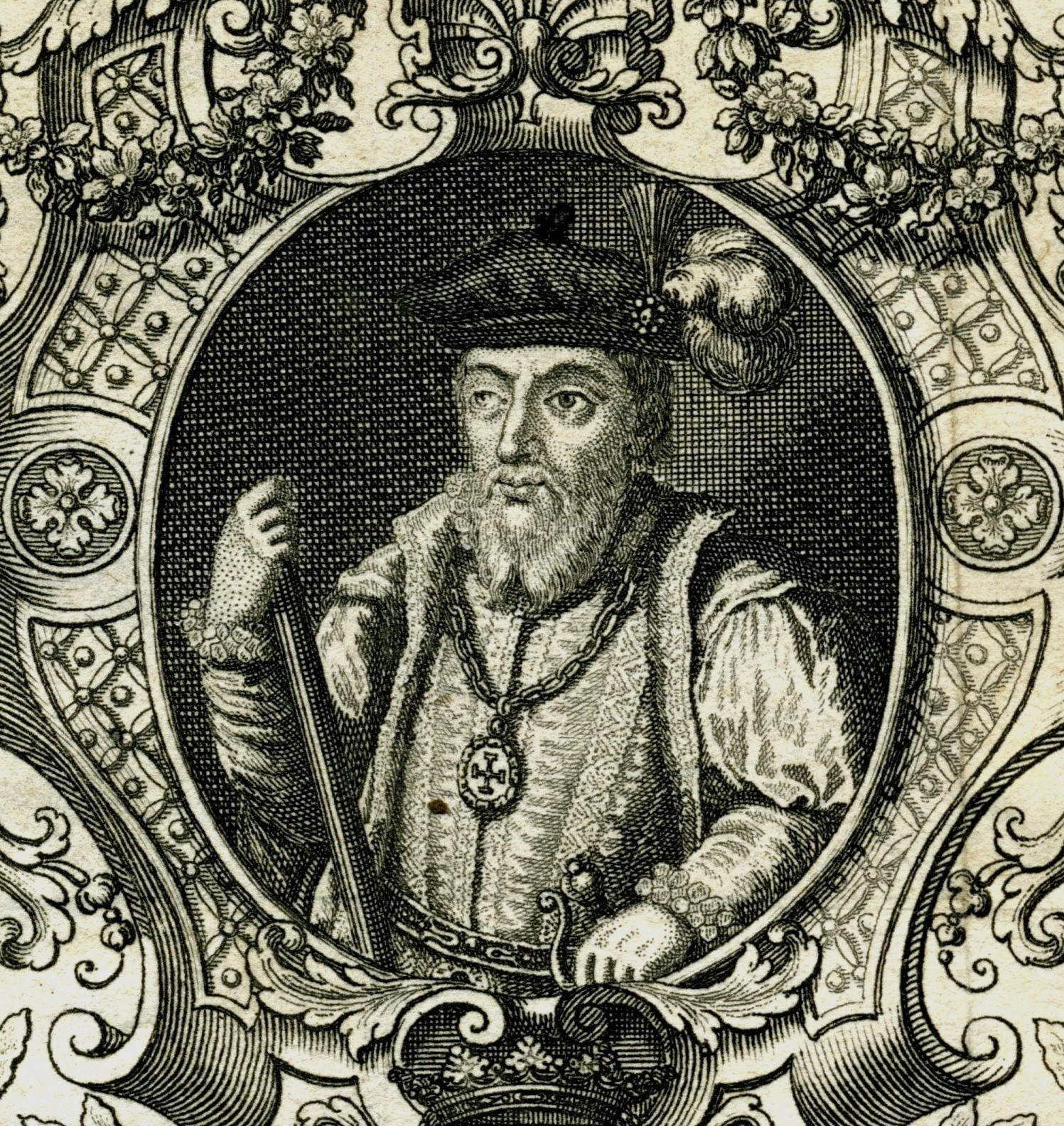
Constantino of Braganza was Viceroy of Portuguese India and led the 1st Portuguese invasion of Sri Lanka.

The fifth Duke, Teodósio I, is remembered for being the personification of the Portuguese Renaissance. A patron of the arts and scholarly noble, Teodósio I maintained the prestige of the House of Braganza, although not leaving a significant mark on the House's history. The Duke notably ceded the Dukedom of Guimarães to Infante Duarte of Portugal as the dowry of his sister, Isabel of Braganza.

Teodósio I's second son, Jaime of Braganza, died fighting alongside King Sebastião I at the Battle of Alcácer Quibir. The Duke's only daughter, Isabel of Braganza, married Miguel Luis de Meneses, 1st Duke of Caminha, though their union had no issue. Teodósio I's first child and successor, João I, lived a very different life from Teodósio I's calm and relatively peaceful tenure, having been involved in the controversies of the Portuguese succession crisis of 1580 and the subsequent War of the Portuguese Succession.

João I's tenure as Duke was one intertwined with controversy and intrigue. Having been married to Infanta Catarina, daughter of Infante Duarte, Duke of Guimarães, and thus a grandchild of King Manuel I, during the succession crisis of 1580, the couple pressed their claims to the Portuguese throne. Though Infanta Catarina was a popular claimant, her Habsburg cousin was eventually crowned Philip I of Portugal and the Iberian Union was established. In an attempt at reconciliation with the Brigantine House, King Philip I renewed the title of Constable of Portugal, which João I had held previously, to the Duke's first son, Teodósio II, alongside other title and land grants to the Duke and the House.

João I's daughters, Maria, Serefina, Querubina, and Angélica, were some of the most eligible ladies of Portugal and all Iberia, though the only one to marry was Serefina of Braganza, who married Castilian Juan Fernandez Pacheco, 5th Duke of Escalona. The Duke's oldest son and successor, Teodósio II, famously fought in the Battle of Alcácer Quibir at the age of ten and later became an accomplished general. João I's second son, Duarte of Braganza, was made 1st Marquis of Frechilla, and the Duke's third son, Alexandre of Braganza, became Archbishop of Évora, both receiving their titles and many concessions from King Philip I when the monarch was making amends with the House of Braganza. Unlike his other sons, João I's last son, Filipe of Braganza, died without marriage, children, or titles.

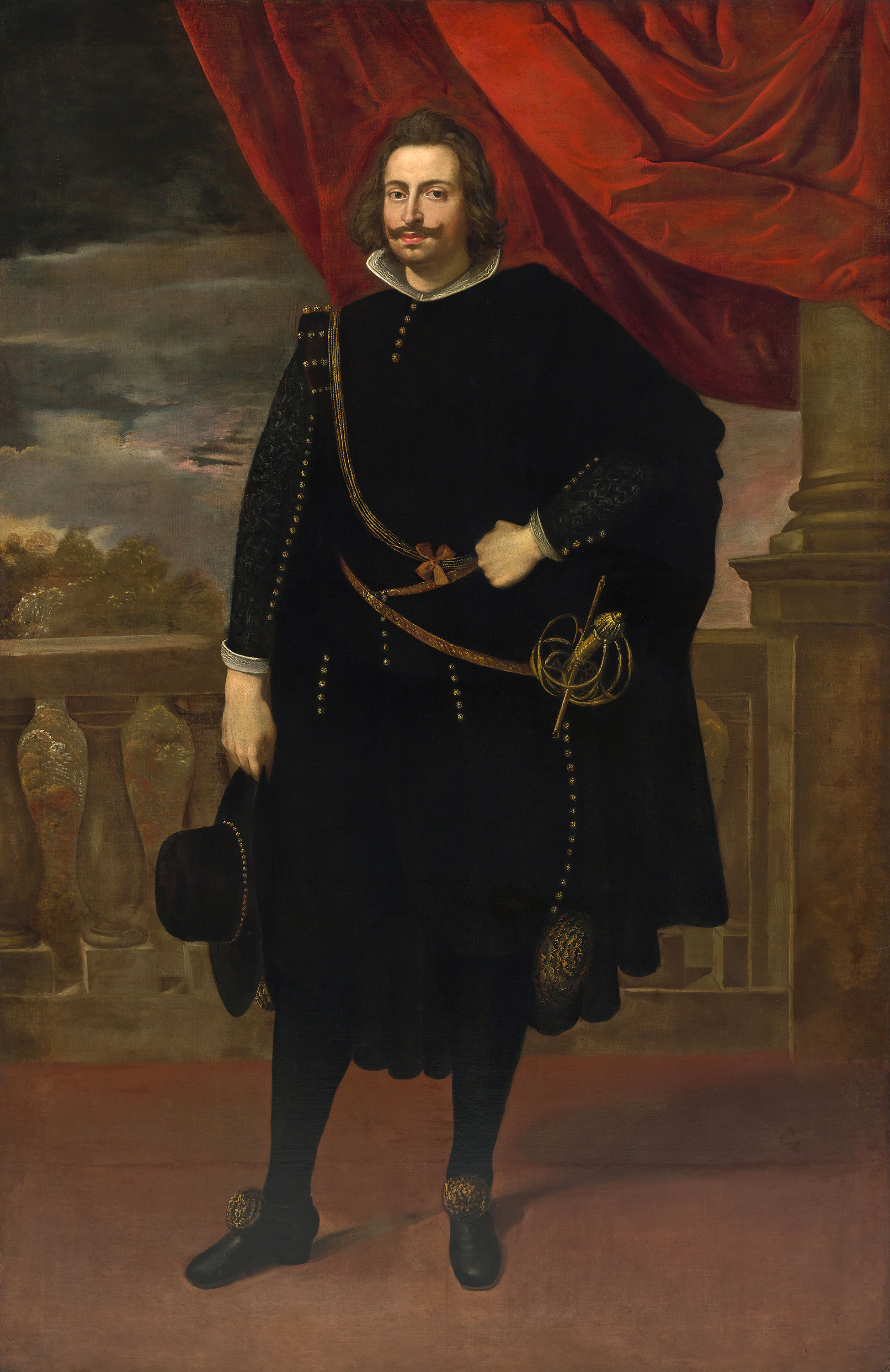
In 1640, John IV became the first Braganza to reign as King of Portugal, starting the Portuguese Restoration War.

The seventh Duke, Teodósio II, became famous at a young age, having been made page to King Sebastião I and having marched into the Battle of Alcácer Quibir, alongside the King and his uncle, Jaime of Braganza, at the age of ten. Teodósio II later pledged his allegiance and became a faithful countryman to the Philippine Dynasty, having even defended Lisbon against King Philip I's rival claimant to the throne, António, Prior of Crato, who had been acclaimed, by his supporters, as King António I of Portugal. In recognition for his military prowess, Teodósio II was made Constable of Portugal. The Duke's support and service to the Philippine Dynasty, earned the Braganzas more lands and titles and, by 1640, the House had amassed around 80,000 vassals, alongside numerous churches, orders, and institutions under its patronage.

In 1603, Teodósio II married Ana de Velasco y Girón, daughter of Castilian Juan Fernández de Velasco, 5th Duke of Frías, and had four children with her. The Duke's first son and successor, João II, raise the House of Braganza to new heights of power, having launched the Portuguese Restoration War and been acclaimed King João IV of Portugal, thus installing the House as the ruling dynasty of Portugal. Teodósio II's second son, Duarte of Braganza, was made Lord of Vila do Conde and became a diplomat, serving at the court of Ferdinand III, Holy Roman Emperor, but later died a prisoner as a cost of the Restoration War. Teodósio II's two other children, Alexandre and Catarina, both died without children, titles, or marriage.

== Throne of Portugal ==
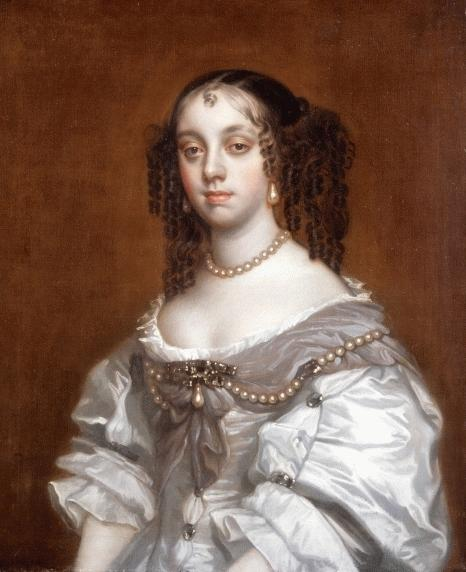
Queen Catherine of Braganza, wife of Charles II of England, credited with introducing the English to tea-drinking, popular with the Portuguese nobility.

By 1640 the wise policies of D. Philip I in respect of Portugal were long past. The country was overtaxed, Portuguese colonies were left unprotected, and the King Philip III of Portugal no longer had the trust or support of most Portuguese nobility. He was especially loathed by the powerful Portuguese guild of merchants. Portugal, like the rest of Philip's kingdoms, was on the verge of rebellion.

The eighth Duke of Braganza, D. João II of Braganza, had inherited the claim of his grandmother, Infanta Catarina of Portugal, and the remoter claim through of his grandfather João I of Braganza. Because of his claims, the discontent Portuguese nobility asked João II to lead their restoration as their king. According to court historians, D. João II was a modest man without particular ambitions to the crown. Legend says that his wife, Dona Luisa de Guzmán, daughter of the duke of Medina-Sidonia, urged him to accept the offer, saying "I'd rather be queen for one day than duchess for a lifetime." He accepted the leadership of the rebellion, which was successful, and was acclaimed João IV of Portugal on 1 December 1640.

After the accession of the Braganzas to the throne, the duchy was linked to the Crown. "Duke of Braganza" became the traditional title of the heir to the throne, together with Prince of Brazil and, later, Prince Royal of Portugal. João's accession resulted in the Portuguese Restoration War with Spain. The sovereignty of Portugal's new dynasty would not be recognized until 1668 during the reign of João's son, Afonso VI.

The zenith of the Braganza dynasty came with the long reign of D. João V (1706–1750), who ruled with grandeur and piety. The reign of D. José I, son of D. João V, was marked by the great earthquake, which struck Lisbon in 1755. The political genius of his reign was the 1st Marquis of Pombal. The end of the 18th century was characterized by stability, under the rule of Dona Maria I (1777–1816), who discharged Pombal at her accession. Because Maria's recurrent mental illness rendered her incapable of governing, her son João assumed the role of head of government in 1792.

== Realm in Brazil ==
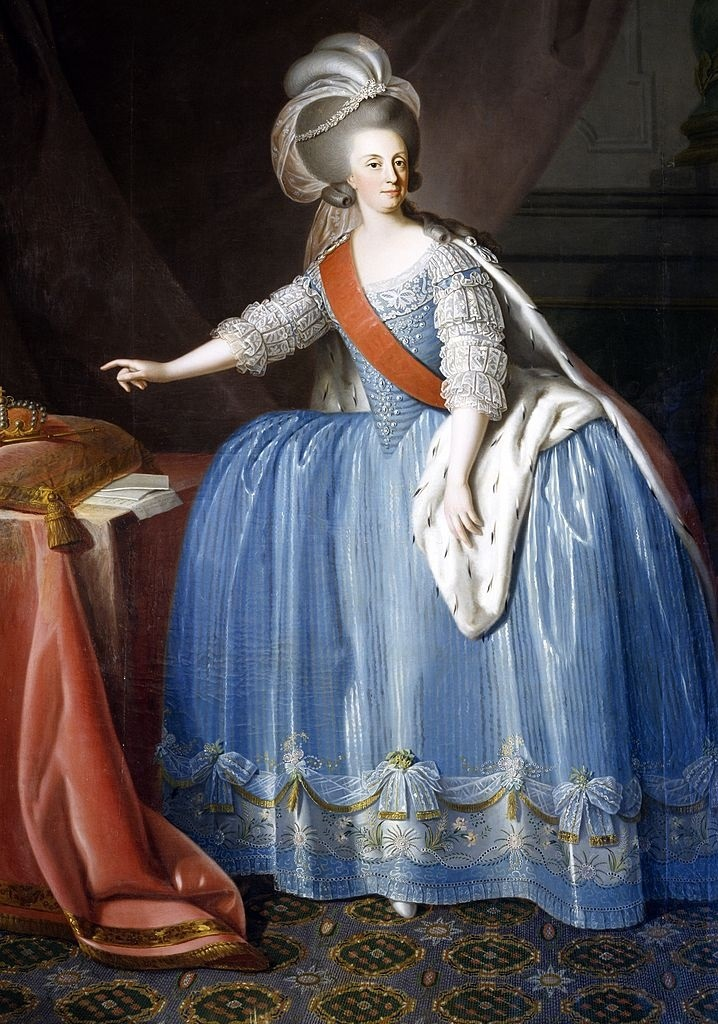
Queen Maria I became the first monarch of Brazil with the creation of the United Kingdom of Portugal, Brazil and the Algarves in 1815.

In 1807, faced with impending Napoleonic invasion, the Braganzas transferred their royal court to the State of Brazil, Portugal's largest colony. Some time after they had crossed the Atlantic, a royal decree changed the status of Brazil from a Portuguese colony to a kingdom alongside Portugal, and the United Kingdom of Portugal, Brazil and the Algarves was formed. D. João VI succeeded in 1816, and returned to Portugal in 1821.

João VI left his eldest son, D. Pedro, Prince Royal of Portugal, Brazil, and the Algarves, as regent in Brazil. In 1822, Brazilian rebels declared independence and acclaimed D. Pedro as Emperor of Brazil. D. Pedro I ruled Brazil until 1831, when he abdicated in favor of his young son D. Pedro II, and returned to Portugal to aid his daughter D. Maria II (see below).

D. Pedro II, being only six years old at the time of his coronation, had a regency established. The regency rules until 1840, when the Emperor turned 14 years old. His reign lasted until 1889, when the Brazilian monarchy was abolished. His reign saw the abolition of slavery in Brazil, economic growth, and very long periods of tranquility and development in his empire.

== Warring branches ==
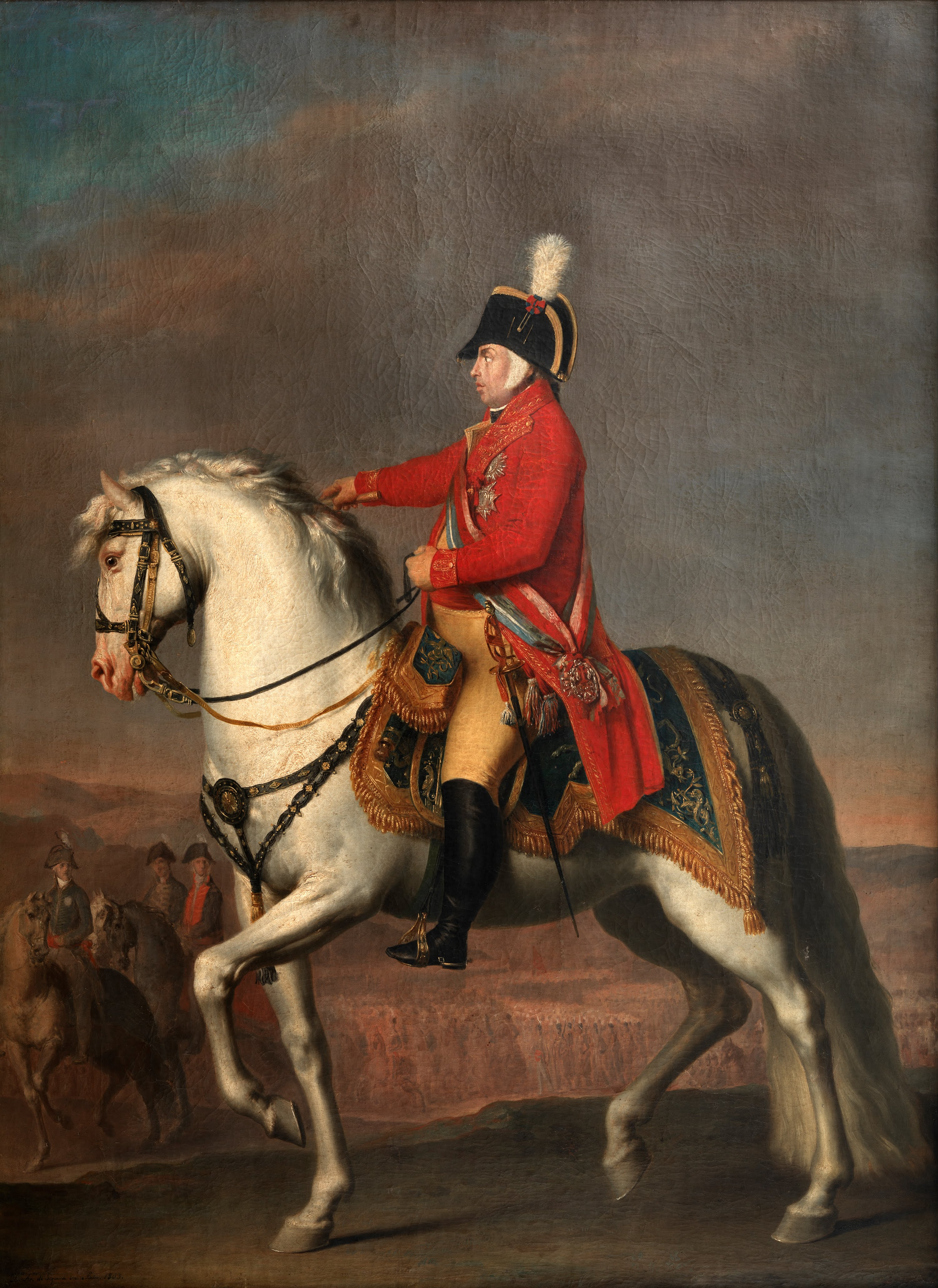
King-Emperor João VI's children split the Braganzas into 3 branches: the Brazilian Imperial branch, the Portuguese Constitutional branch, and the exiled Miguelist branch.

In Portugal, D. Pedro I of Brazil became King as D. Pedro IV (1826), but no one wanted to re-establish the union of Portugal and Brazil. Pedro abdicated the Portuguese throne in favor of his daughter Princess Maria da Glória, then seven years old. D. Pedro's brother D. Miguel was to act as Regent, and to marry Maria when she came of age. In 1828, Miguel instead proclaimed himself King of Portugal and repudiated the liberal constitution granted by D. João VI, trying to establish an absolute monarchy.

In 1828, Maria II was forced into exile by her uncle, the new King Miguel I. Her father D. Pedro IV of Portugal returned from Brazil, launched a successful military campaign, from the Azores, against Miguel I. He finally defeated and exiled Miguel I in 1834. Though exiled, Miguel would not give up his claim to the throne and would establish the Miguelist branch of the House of Braganza. The strategic marriages of his children to the various royal houses of Europe would earn him the nickname the "Grandfather of Europe".

== First Reign of Brazil ==
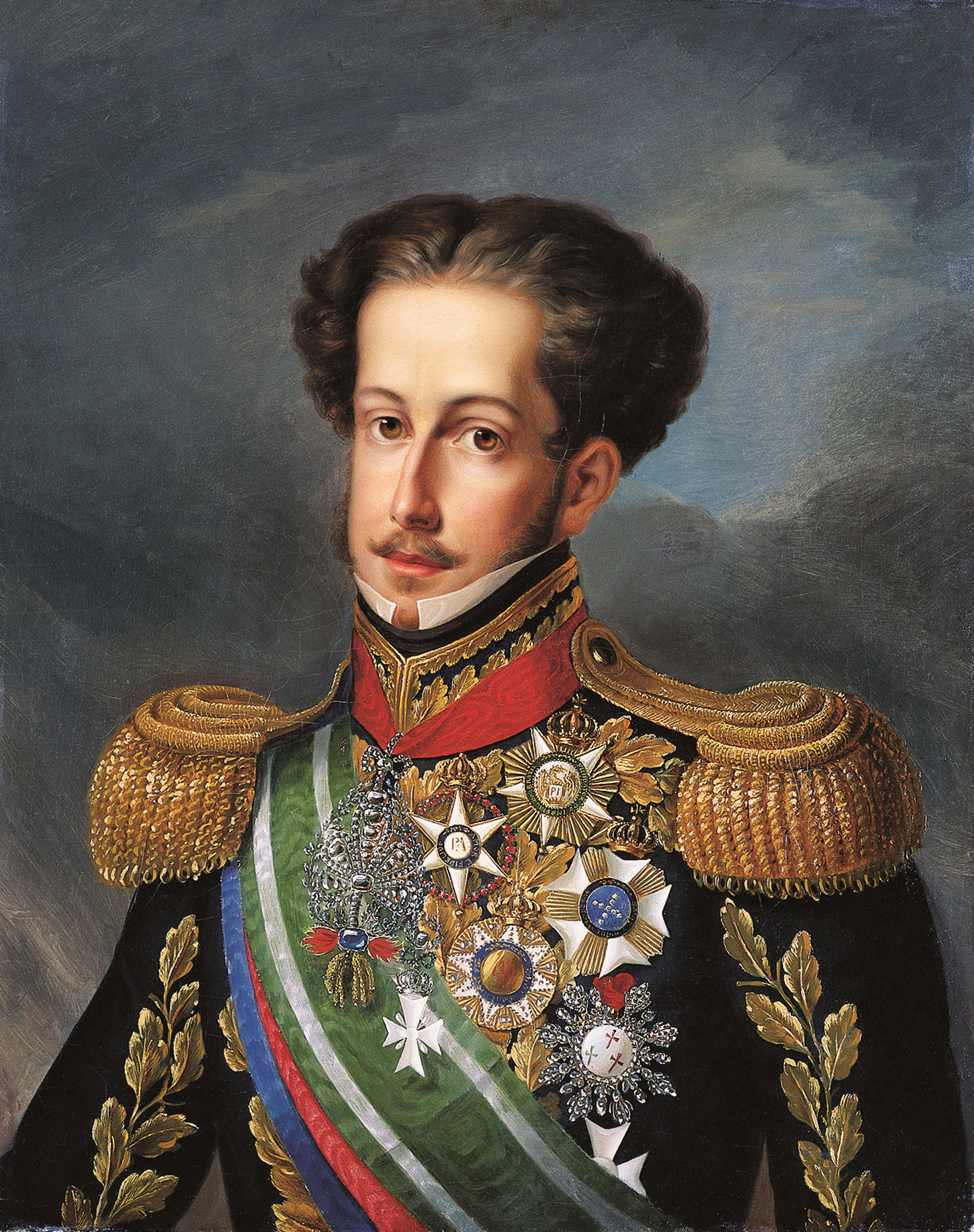
Emperor-King Pedro I and IV achieved the Brazilian independence as Emperor of Brazil and won the Liberal Wars as King of Portugal.

On 7 September 1822, Dom Pedro of Braganza, Prince Royal of Portugal, Brazil and the Algarves, member of the House of Braganza, heir apparent to the Portuguese throne and Regent of the Kingdom of Brazil, declared the country's independence from the United Kingdom of Portugal, Brazil and the Algarves and was acclaimed Emperor of Brazil. On 12 October, the prince was acclaimed Pedro I, first Emperor of the newly created Empire of Brazil, a constitutional monarchy. In 1825, signing the treaty of Rio de Janeiro of this date, his father, King Dom João VI, recognized the independence of the new state, the former Portuguese dominion, now Empire of Brazil.

Pedro I encountered a number of crises during his reign. A secessionist rebellion in the Cisplatine Province in early 1825 and the subsequent attempt by the United Provinces of the Río de la Plata (later Argentina) to annex Cisplatina led the Empire into the failed Cisplatine War. In March 1826, João VI died and Pedro I inherited the Portuguese crown, briefly becoming King Pedro IV of Portugal before abdicating in favor of his eldest daughter, Maria II. The situation worsened in 1828 when the war in the south ended with Brazil's loss of Cisplatina, which would become the independent republic of Uruguay. During the same year in Lisbon, Maria II's throne was usurped by Prince Miguel, Pedro I's younger brother.

Other difficulties arose when the Empire's parliament opened in 1826. Pedro I, along with a significant percentage of the legislature, argued for an independent judiciary, a popularly elected legislature and a government which would be led by the emperor who held broad executive powers and prerogatives. Others in parliament argued for a similar structure, only with a less influential role for the monarch and the legislative branch being dominant in policy and governance.

The struggle over whether the government would be dominated by the emperor or by the parliament was carried over into debates from 1826 to 1831 on the establishment of the governmental and political structure. Unable to deal with the problems in both Brazil and Portugal simultaneously, the Emperor abdicated on behalf of his son, Pedro II, on 7 April 1831 and immediately sailed for Europe to restore his daughter to her throne.

== Second Reign of Brazil ==
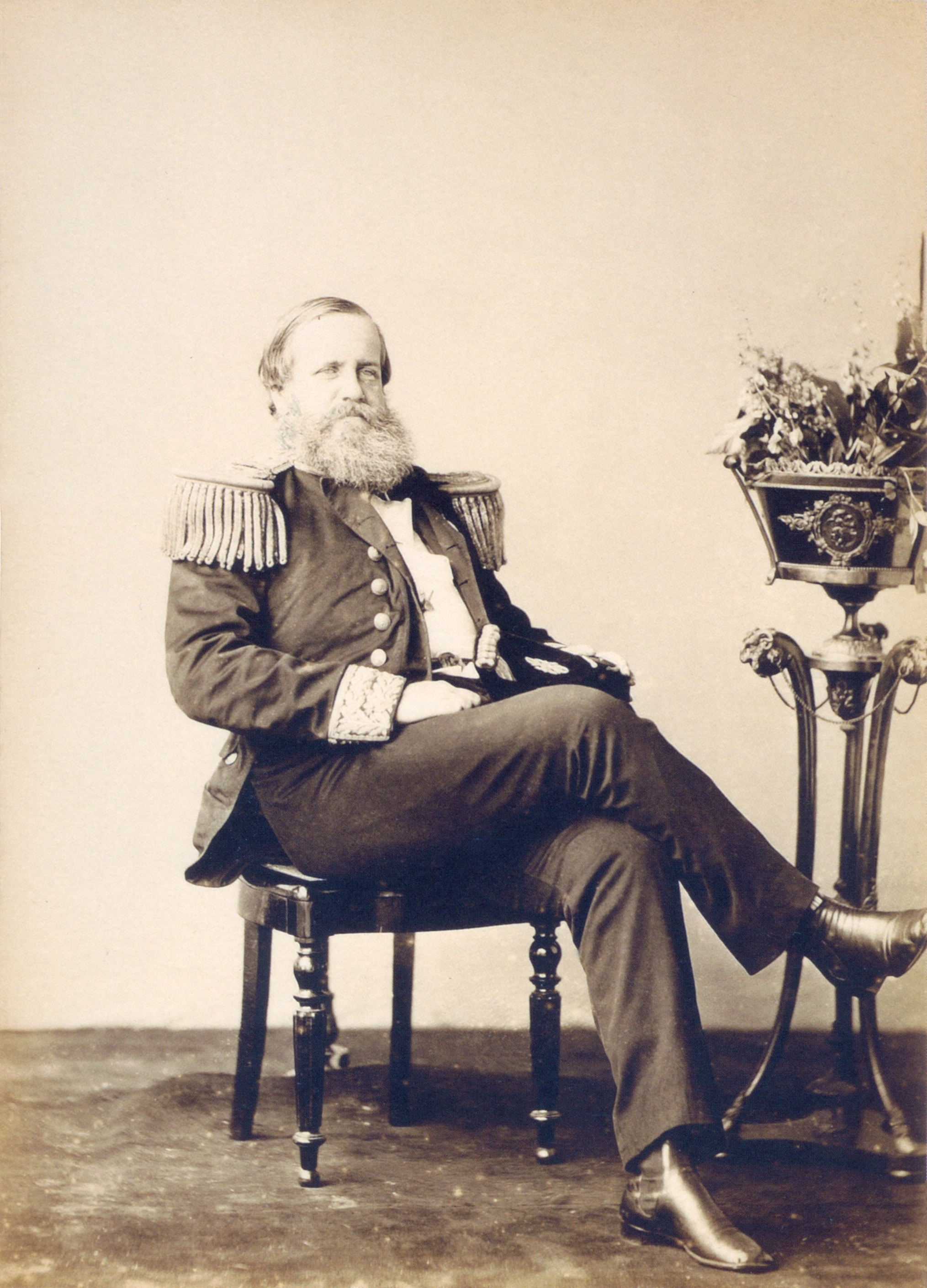
Pedro II was the last Emperor of Brazil after the Proclamation of the Republic of Brazil in 1889.

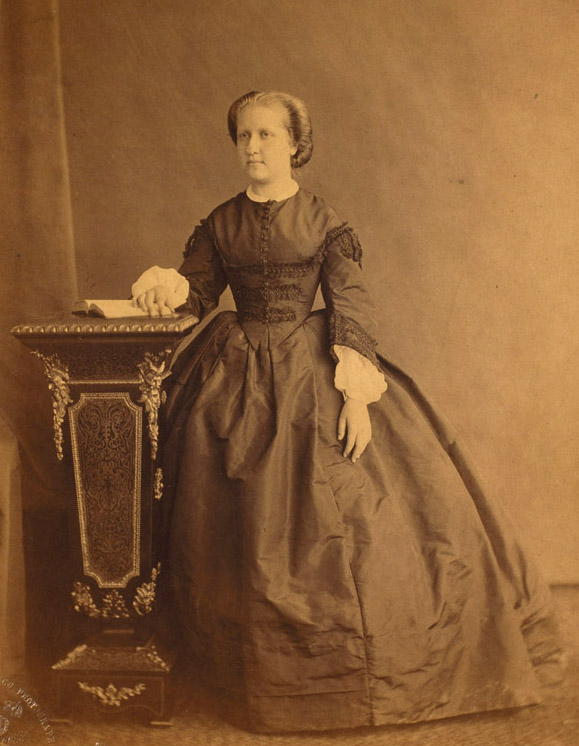
Isabel of Braganza, Princess Imperial of Brazil signed the Lei Áurea in 1888, abolishing slavery in Brazil.

Pedro I's successor in Brazil was his five-year-old son, Pedro II. As the latter was still a minor, a weak regency was created. The power vacuum resulting from the absence of a ruling monarch as the ultimate arbiter in political disputes led to regional civil wars between local factions. Having inherited an empire on the verge of disintegration, Pedro II, once he was declared of age in 1840, at 14 years old, managed to bring peace and stability to the country, which eventually became an emerging international power. Brazil was victorious in three international conflicts (the Platine War, the Uruguayan War and the Paraguayan War) under Pedro II's rule, and the Empire prevailed in several other international disputes and outbreaks of domestic strife. With prosperity and economic development came an influx of European immigration, including Protestants and Jews, although Brazil remained mostly Catholic. Slavery, which had initially been widespread, was restricted by successive legislation until its final abolition in 1888 by Princess Isabel.

Even though the last four decades of Pedro II's reign were marked by continuous internal peace and economic prosperity, he had no desire to see the monarchy survive beyond his lifetime and made no effort to maintain support for the institution. The next in line to the throne was his daughter Isabel, but neither Pedro II nor the ruling classes considered a female monarch acceptable. Lacking any viable heir, the Empire's political leaders saw no reason to defend the monarchy. Although there was no desire among the majority of Brazilians to change the country's form of government, republicans began pressuring army officers to overthrow the monarchy. After a 58-year reign, on 15 November 1889 the Emperor was overthrown in a sudden coup d'état led by a clique of military leaders whose goal was the formation of a republic headed by a dictator, forming the First Brazilian Republic. Throughout the coup Pedro II dismissed all suggestions put forward by politicians and military leaders for quelling the rebellion. The Emperor and his family were exiled to the Portuguese kingdom and France. Although there was significant monarchist reaction after the fall of the Empire, this was thoroughly suppressed, and neither Pedro II nor his daughter and heiress supported a forced restoration.

== Constitutional Kings ==
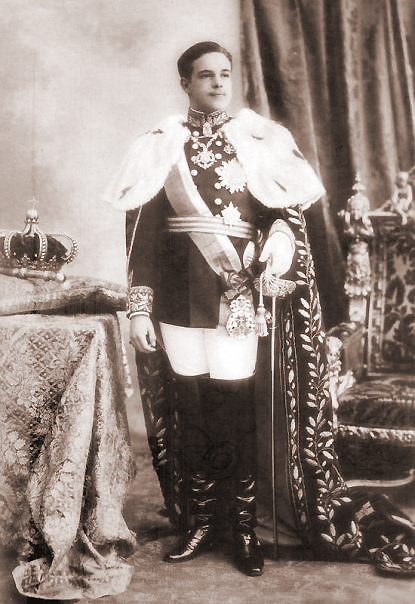
Manuel II, last King of Portugal and the last Braganza to rule as a monarch.

In 1836, Queen Maria II of Portugal married Prince Ferdinand of Saxe-Coburg-Gotha, later King Ferdinand II of Portugal. Despite the tradition of following the custom of patrilineal descent of royal houses, common throughout Europe, Article 5 of the Portuguese constitution of 1826 stated that "The Reigning Dynasty of the Most Serene House of Braganza Shall Continue in the Person of Lady Princess Maria da Glória, by the Abdication and Cession of Her August Father Lord Pedro I, Emperor of Brazil, Legitimate Heir and Successor of Lord João VI.".

Maria II was succeeded in 1853 by her son D. Pedro V, a hard-working reformer who died prematurely in 1861 of typhoid fever. D. Pedro V was succeeded by his brother D. Luís, as D. Pedro V had no children.

D. Luís I was succeeded in 1889 by his son, D. Carlos I. Carlos I's popularity dramatically declined after Portugal submitted to the 1890 British Ultimatum, and ceded its claim to territories between Portuguese West Africa and Portuguese East Africa (as shown in the Pink Map) to Britain. Popular anger over submission to the Ultimatum, combined with the deposition of the Emperor Pedro II of Brazil, resulted in a rise of republican sentiment in Portugal.

In 1908, republicans assassinated King Carlos I and his eldest son, D. Luís Filipe, Prince Royal. His younger son, D. Manuel, Duke of Beja, survived the attack and became king as Manuel II, but was toppled two years later in the 1910 republican revolution. After the revolution, Manuel sought refuge in Great Britain and showed little inclination towards pursuing a restoration.

== Modern Braganzas ==
=== Portuguese Braganzas ===
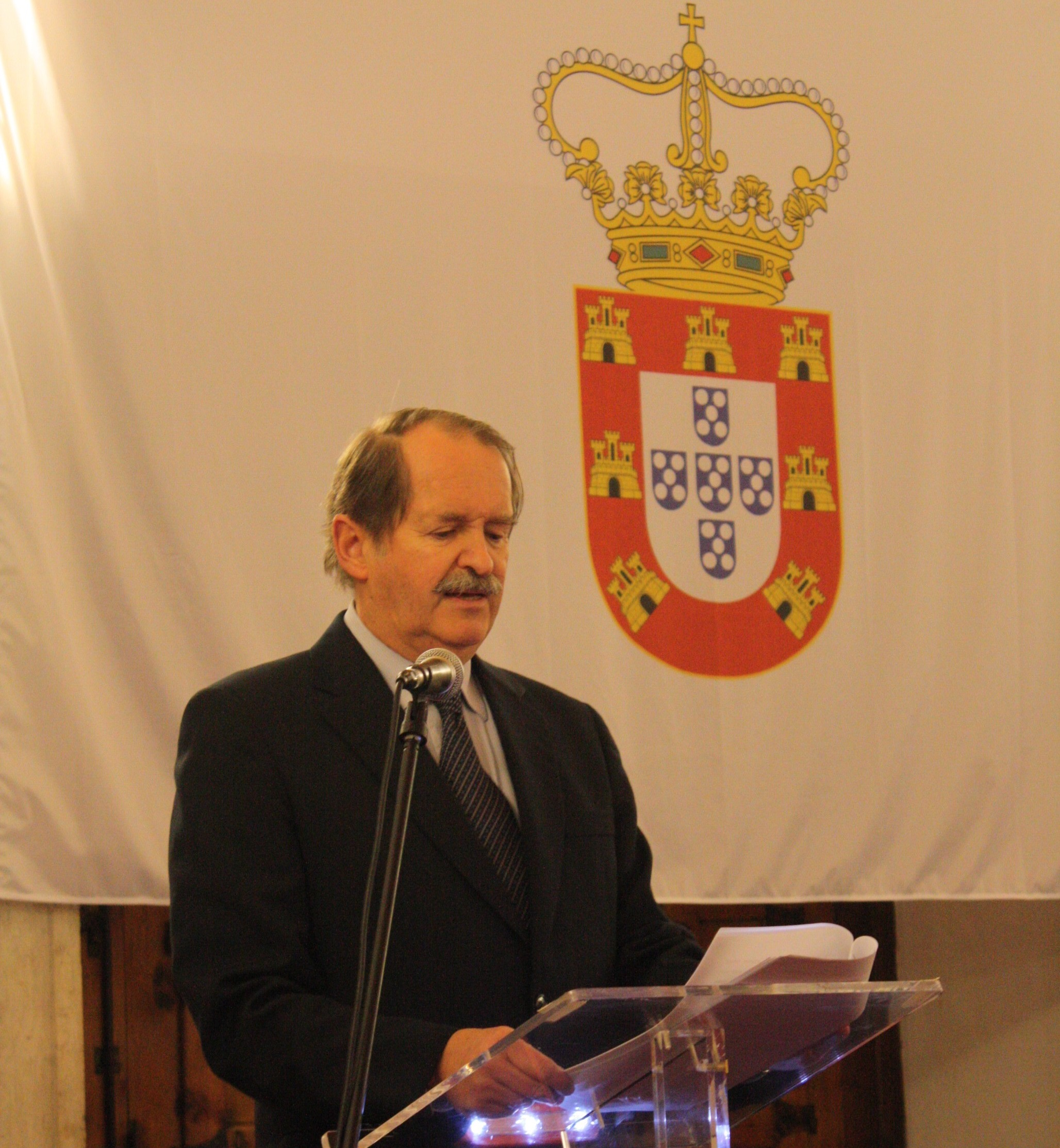
Duarte Pio, Duke of Braganza, Head of the House of Braganza and recognized pretender to the Crown of Portugal since 1976.

After the revolution of 1910, King Manuel II settled in England until his death in 1932. He was childless, and descendants of Miguel of Braganza (the usurper of 1826) claimed the throne. In 1922, the two (of the now four) branches of the House of Braganza allegedly negotiated a pact under which Manuel II named as his heir Duarte Nuno of Braganza, grandson of Miguel. In 1942, Duarte Nuno, now Duke of Braganza, married a great-granddaughter of Emperor Pedro II of Brazil, uniting the two lines of the House. He remained the Braganza pretender until his death in 1976.

In 1950 Portugal repealed the law of exile against the Braganzas, and Duarte Nuno moved to the country in 1952.

Duarte Nuno was succeeded as pretender by his son, Duarte Pio of Braganza (born 1945). Duarte Pio served in the Portuguese Armed Forces and took the customary oath of allegiance to the Republic, but Portuguese monarchists recognize him as the pretender to the Portuguese throne. In 1995 he married Isabel de Herédia, a Portuguese businesswoman and descendant of Francisco Correia de Herédia, 1st Viscount of Ribeira Brava (a Vitalício title, meaning Life peerage). He worked actively in support of the independence of East Timor from Indonesia.

Duarte Pio and Isabel have three children. Duarte Pio's oldest son is Afonso de Santa Maria, who bears the traditional titles of Prince of Beira (as heir apparent to the Portuguese pretender) and Duke of Barcelos (as heir apparent to the Duke of Braganza). He has a brother Dinis, Duke of Porto, and a sister, Infanta Maria Francisca.

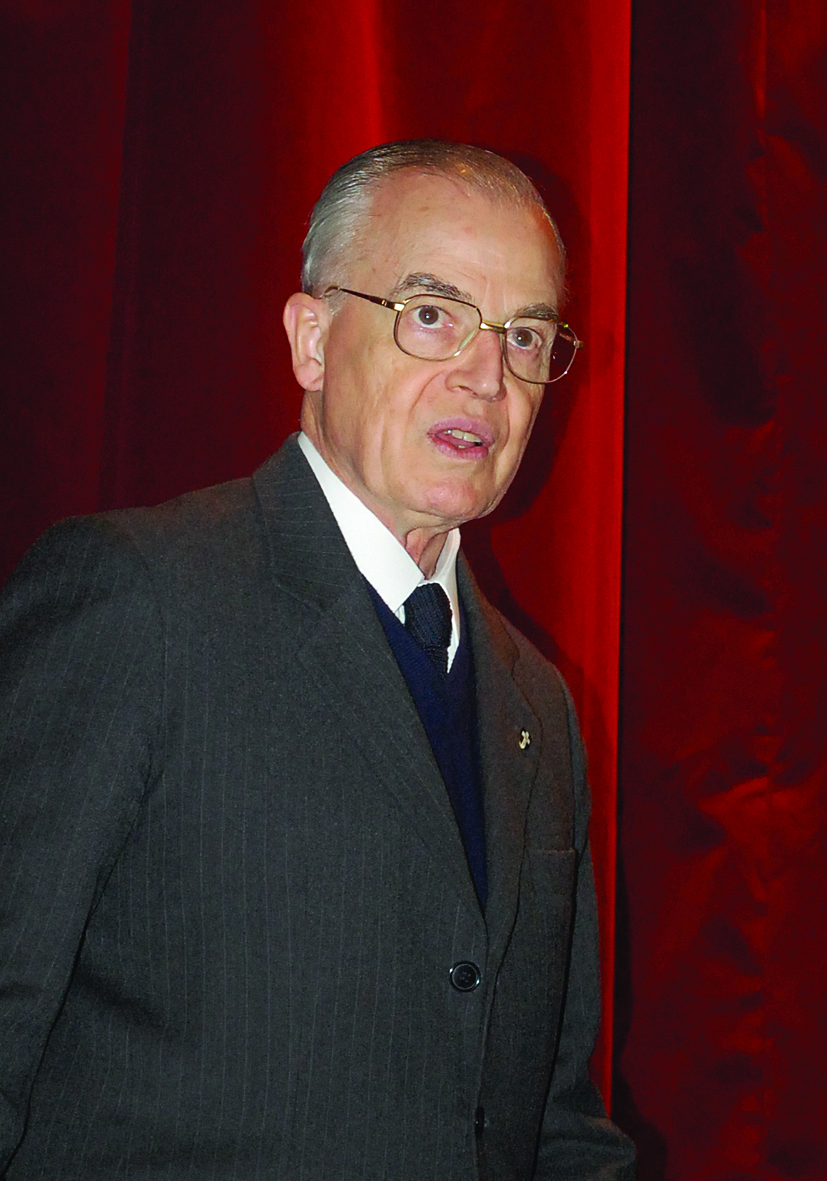
Prince Bertrand of Orléans-Braganza, Head of the Brazilian Imperial Family since the death of his older brother in 2022.

Maria Pia of Saxe-Coburg and Braganza, who claimed she was an illegitimate daughter of King Carlos I of Portugal, began asserting that she was the heir to the throne from 1957. Allegedly, she adopted the Italian Rosario Poidimani, transferring her claimed rights to the Portuguese throne to him.

=== Brazilian Braganzas ===
After the military coup of 1889, Emperor Dom Pedro II settled in France until his death in 1891. His eldest daughter and family went to live in the Chateau d'Eu in French Normandy. She was recognized by Brazilian monarchists as Empress-in-Exile as Dona Isabel I of Brazil until her death in 1921.

She was succeeded by her grandson, Prince Pedro Henrique of Orléans-Braganza, as Head of the Imperial House of Brazil, and he by his son Prince Luiz of Orléans-Braganza, who was succeeded by his brother and Current Head Bertrand of Orléans-Braganza. With the end of the banishment of the Imperial Family in 1920, some princes returned to live in Brazil, while another remained in Europe. After the end of World War II, Prince Pedro Henrique, then Head of the Imperial House and married to Princess Maria Elisabeth of Bavaria, returned to Brazil with his family.

The Imperial House of Brazil divided into rival branches because of the renunciation of Pedro de Alcântara, Prince of Grão-Pará in 1908 and the subsequent repudiation of that act by his descendants.

While some members of the two branches of the family subsequently lived in the Grão-Pará Palace, some married royalty or nobles and have lived in Europe, and others elsewhere in Brazil. A 1993 referendum on restoration of the monarchy was defeated, garnering 13.2 percent of the vote against 66 percent for the republic. Members of both the so-called Petropolis branch of Braganzas (Princes Pedro Gastão and his nephew, Joazinho of Orléans-Braganza) and the more broadly recognised Vassouras line of the Imperial Family led by Prince Luiz Gastão of Orléans-Braganza, participated in the restoration effort, and the Head of the Vassouras branch continues to lead a movement to restore the monarchy.

== Braganza dukes and monarchs ==
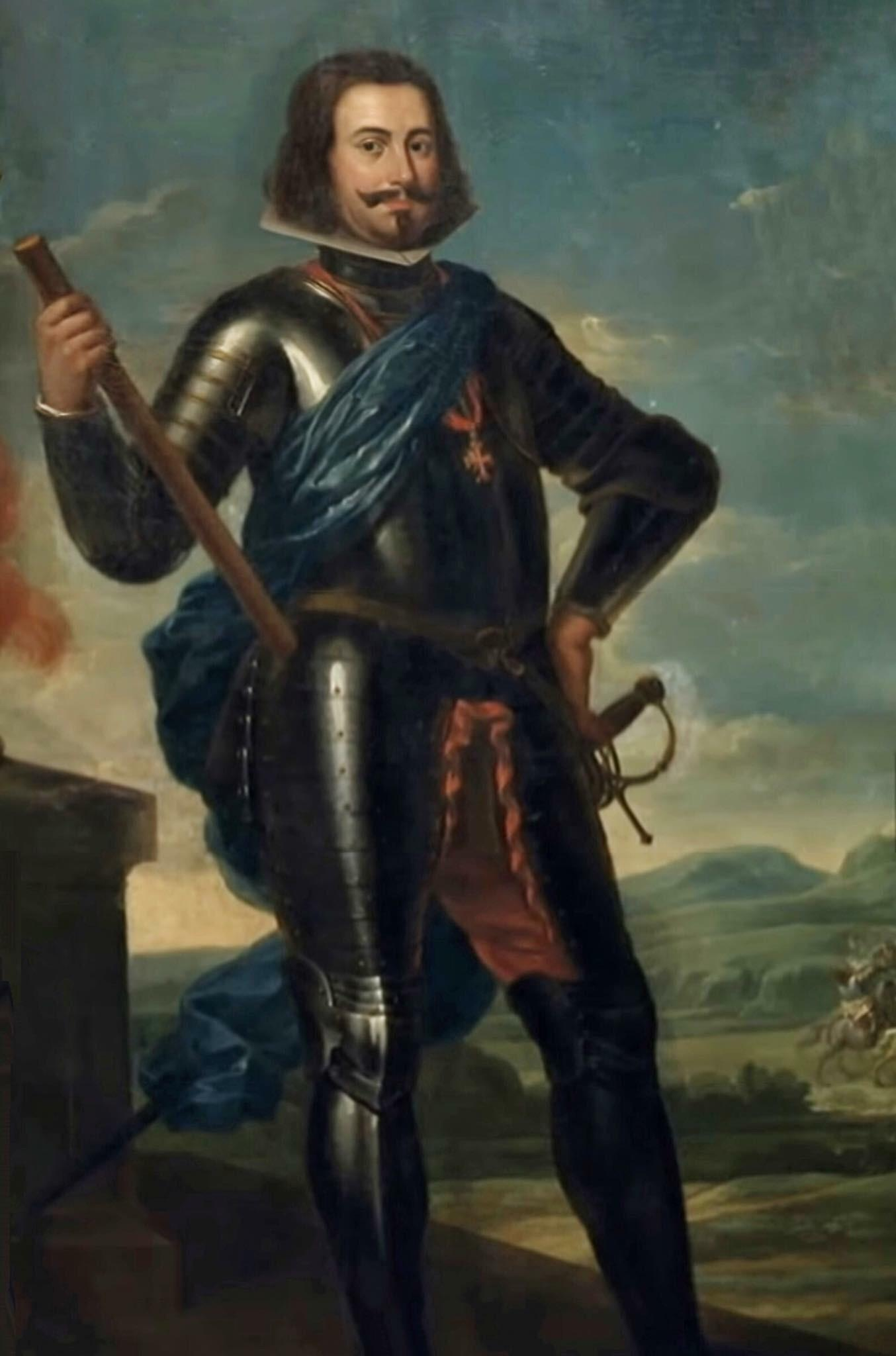
João II of Braganza was the first Braganza King of Portugal as King João IV.

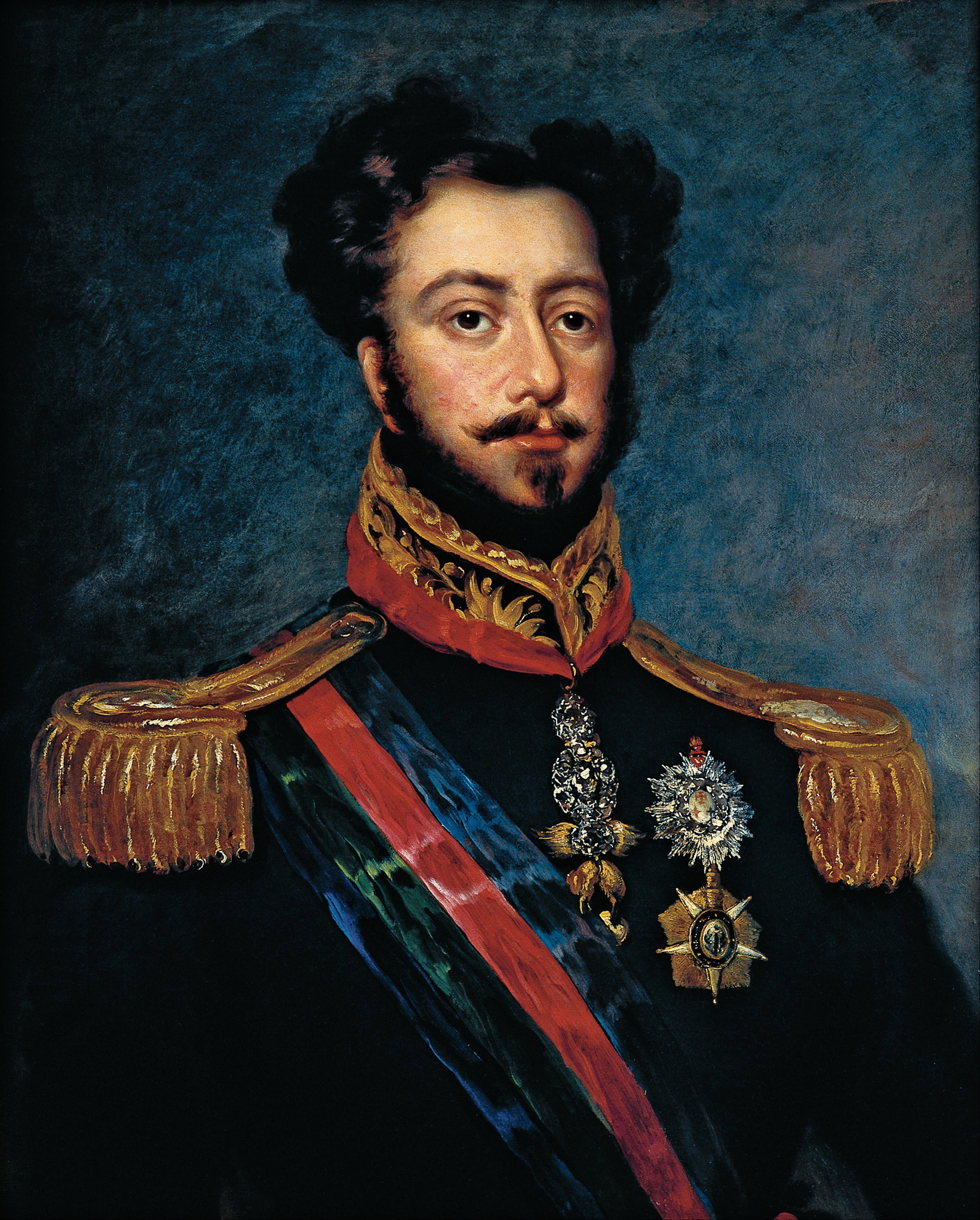
Pedro of Braganza was Emperor of Brazil and King of Portugal as Emperor-King Pedro I and IV.

=== Dukes of Braganza (before ascension to the throne) ===
Name	Became duke	Notes
Afonso I of Braganza	1442	Duke of Braganza; Count of Barcelos
Fernando I of Braganza	1461	Duke of Braganza; Marquis of Vila Viçosa
Fernando II of Braganza	1478	Duke of Braganza; Duke of Guimarães
Jaime I of Braganza	1498	Duke of Braganza
Teodósio I of Braganza	1532	Duke of Braganza; ceded Dukedom of Guimarães
João I of Braganza	1563	Duke of Braganza; Duke of Barcelos
Teodósio II of Braganza	1583	Duke of Braganza
João II of Braganza	1630	Duke of Braganza; Duke of Guimarães; first Braganza monarch of Portugal

=== Monarchs of Portugal ===
Name	Became monarch	Notes
João IV of Portugal	1640	King of Portugal and the Algarves; first Braganza monarch of Portugal
Afonso VI of Portugal	1656	King of Portugal and the Algarves; died without heir
Pedro II of Portugal	1683	King of Portugal and the Algarves; brother of Afonso VI
João V of Portugal	1706	King of Portugal and the Algarves
José I of Portugal	1750	King of Portugal and the Algarves
Maria I of Portugal and Pedro III of Portugal	1777	Queen and King of Portugal, Brazil, and the Algarves
João VI of Portugal	1816	King of Portugal, Brazil, and the Algarves; Titular Emperor of Brazil
Pedro IV of Portugal	1826	King of Portugal and the Algarves; Emperor of Brazil
Maria II of Portugal	1826	Queen of Portugal and the Algarves; lost throne to Miguel I in 1828; regained throne in 1834
Miguel I of Portugal	1828	King of Portugal and the Algarves; reigned for 6 years; succeeded by Maria II
Pedro V of Portugal	1853	King of Portugal and the Algarves
Luís I of Portugal	1861	King of Portugal and the Algarves
Carlos I of Portugal	1889	King of Portugal and the Algarves; assassinated in Lisbon Regicide
Manuel II of Portugal	1908	King of Portugal and the Algarves; last monarch of Portugal

=== Monarchs of Brazil ===
Name	Became monarch	Notes
Maria I of Portugal, Brazil, and the Algarves	1815	Queen and founder of the United Kingdom of Portugal, Brazil, and the Algarves
John VI of Portugal, Brazil, and the Algarves	1816	King of Portugal, Brazil, and the Algarves; Titular Emperor of Brazil; last King of Brazil
Pedro I of Brazil	1822	Emperor of Brazil; proclaimer of Brazilian Independence; King of Portugal and the Algarves
Pedro II of Brazil	1831	Emperor of Brazil; last Emperor of Brazil

== Symbols ==
=== Wyvern ===
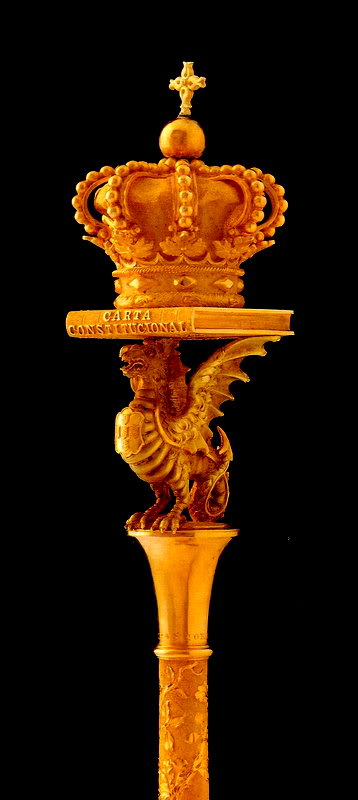
The Sceptre of the Dragon

The traditional symbol and crest of the House of Braganza is a green wyvern, commonly taken to be a dragon, representing Saint George, patron saint of Portugal.

This symbol can be found in many different monuments in Portugal and Brazil, such as the Monument to the Independence of Brazil in São Paulo and in the palaces of the Imperial family in Rio de Janeiro and Petrópolis. It is famously found atop the Portuguese Crown Sceptre and the Sceptre of the Emperor of Brazil. The wyvern is also sometimes used as a supporter in the coat of arms of both the Brazilian and Portuguese branches of the family.

Because of its use in heraldry by the Braganza as the ruling house, and given Pedro IV's link with Porto, a dragon was added to the old coat of arms of the municipality of Porto and is still a part of FC Porto's coat of arms, who are nicknamed "The Dragons".

=== Curse of the Braganzas ===
Since the 17th century, the House of Braganza has allegedly suffered from the Curse of the Braganzas (Portuguese: Maldição dos Braganças). For supposedly mistreating a Franciscan friar, a curse was purportedly placed on King João IV of Portugal, stating that never again would a first-born male of the Braganza Dynasty live long enough to succeed to the throne. Since the reign of King João IV, only three have reigned as monarch in Portugal or Brazil.

Supposed victims of the Curse of the Braganzas:

- Teodósio of Braganza, Prince of Brazil (1634–1653) – First-born son of King João IV of Portugal
- João of Braganza, Prince of Brazil (1688–1688) – First-born son of King Pedro II of Portugal
- Pedro of Braganza, Prince of Brazil (1712–1714) – First-born son of King João V of Portugal
- José of Braganza, Prince of Brazil (1761–1788) – First-born son of Queen Maria I of Portugal and King Pedro III of Portugal
- Francisco António of Braganza, Prince of Beira (1795–1801) – First-born son of King João VI of Portugal
- Miguel of Braganza, Prince of Beira (1820) - First-born son of King-Emperor Pedro I and IV
- Afonso of Braganza, Prince Imperial of Brazil (1845–1847) – First-born son of Emperor Pedro II of Brazil
- Luís Filipe of Braganza, Prince Royal of Portugal (1887–1908) – First-born son of King Carlos I of Portugal

=== Estates and properties ===
Ajuda National Palace, Lisbon

Belém Palace, Lisbon

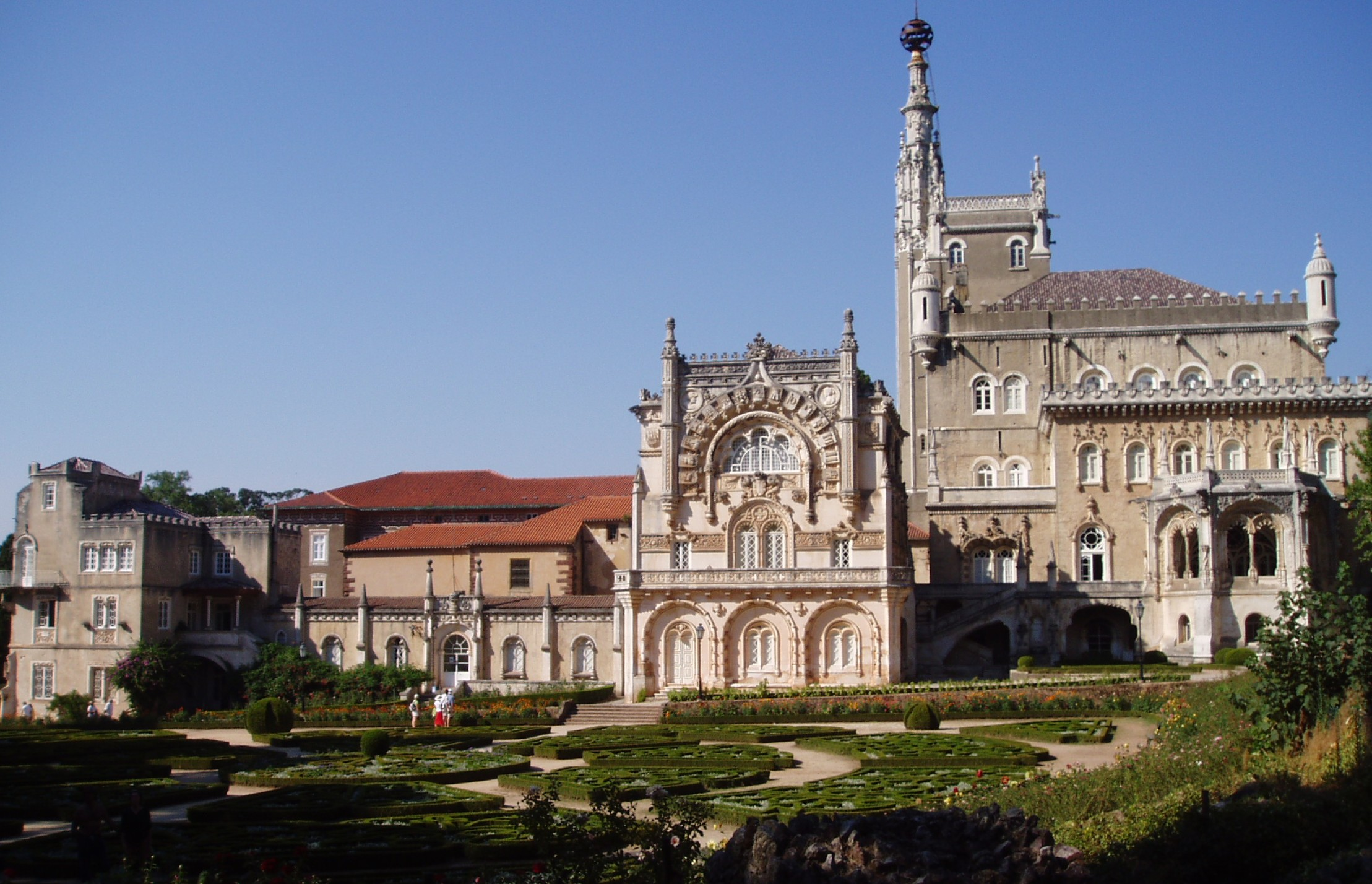
Buçaco Palace, Buçaco

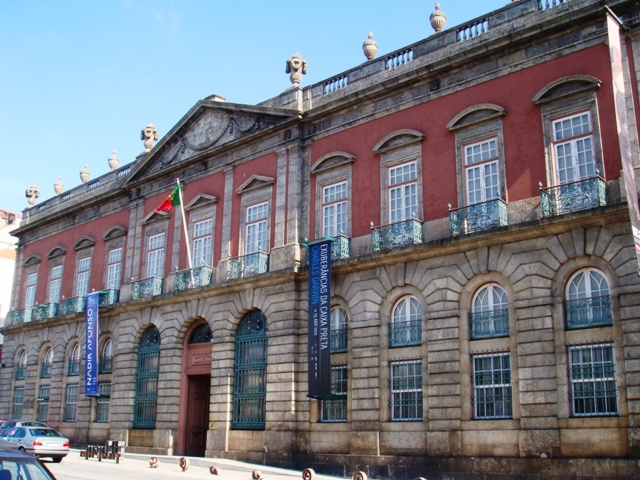
Palace of the Carrancas, Porto

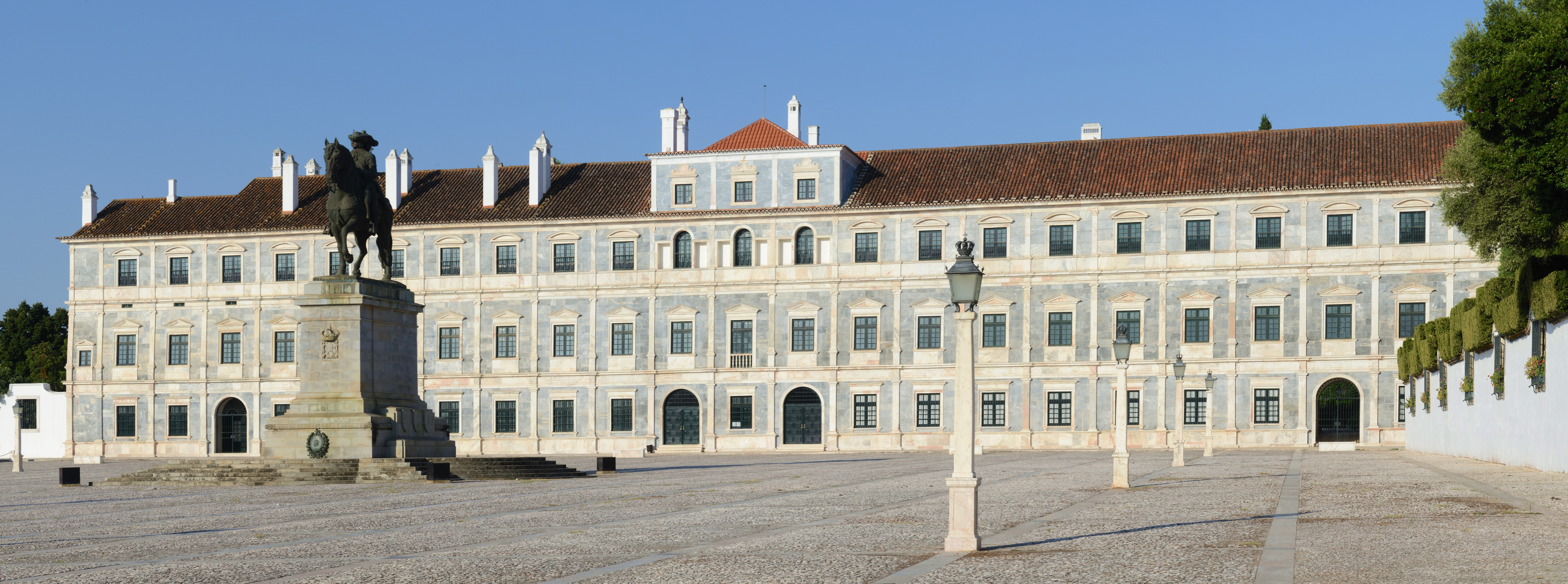
Ducal Palace, Vila Viçosa

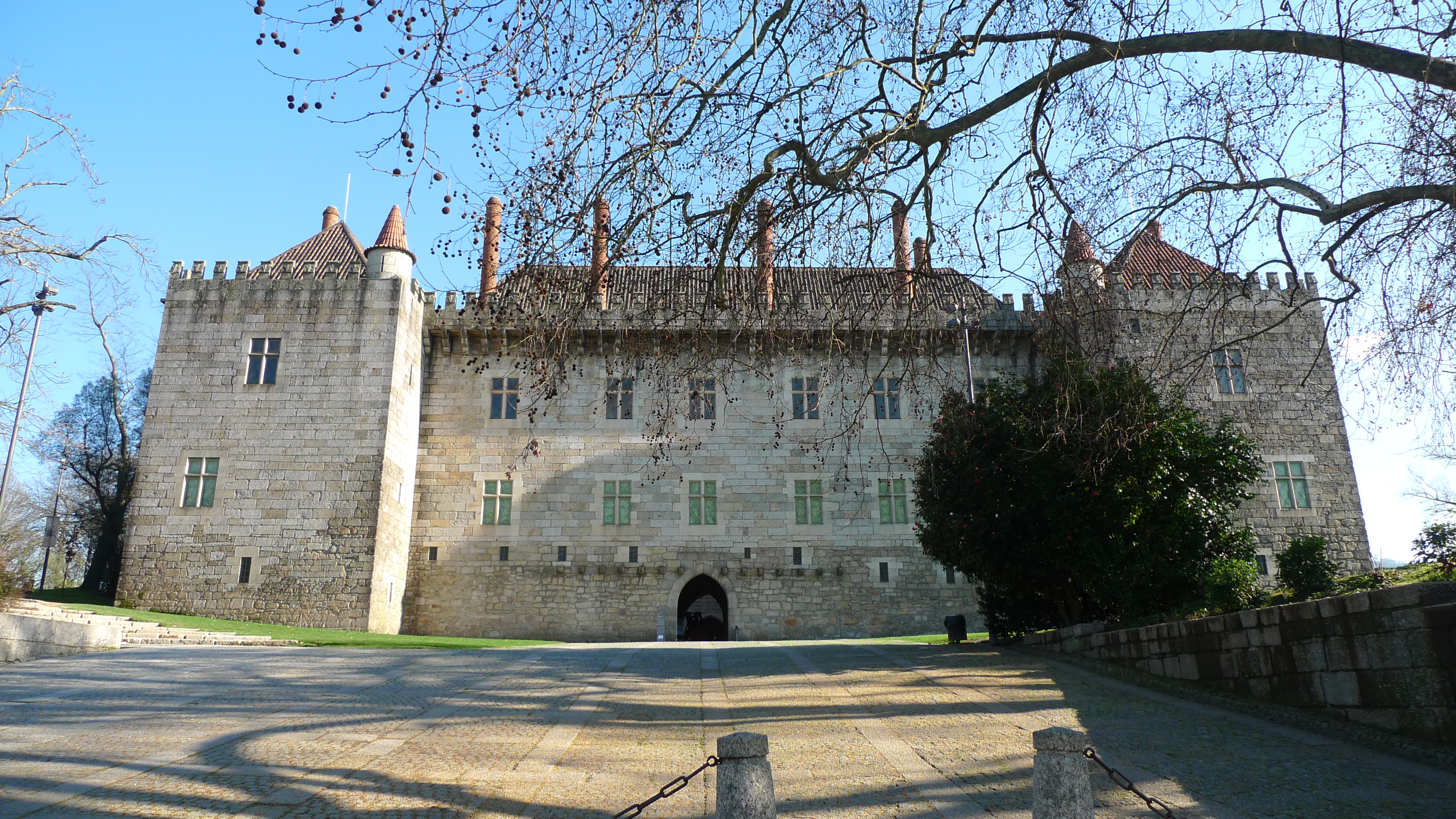
Palace of the Dukes, Guimarães

Necessidades Palace, Lisbon

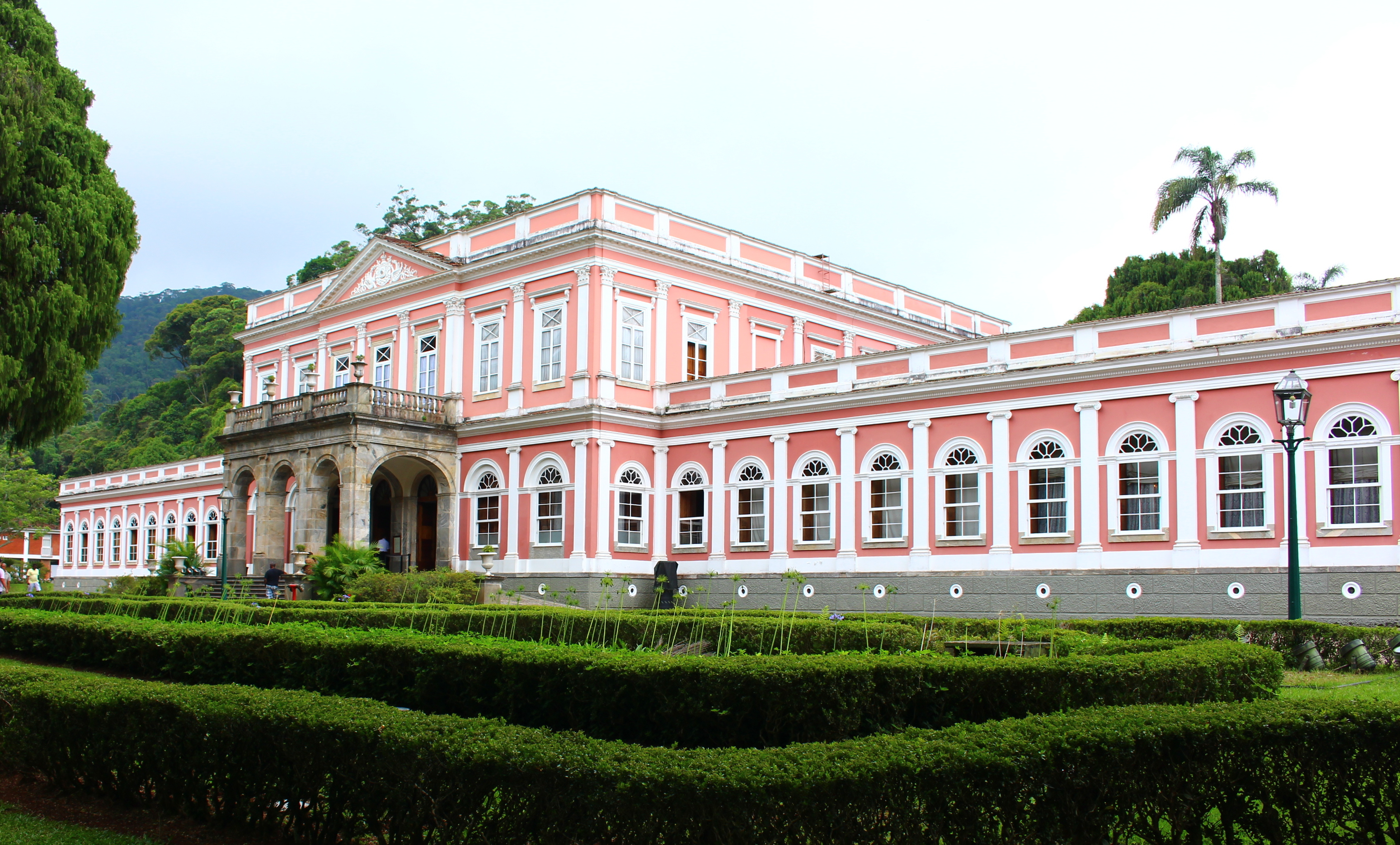
Imperial Palace of Petrópolis, Petrópolis

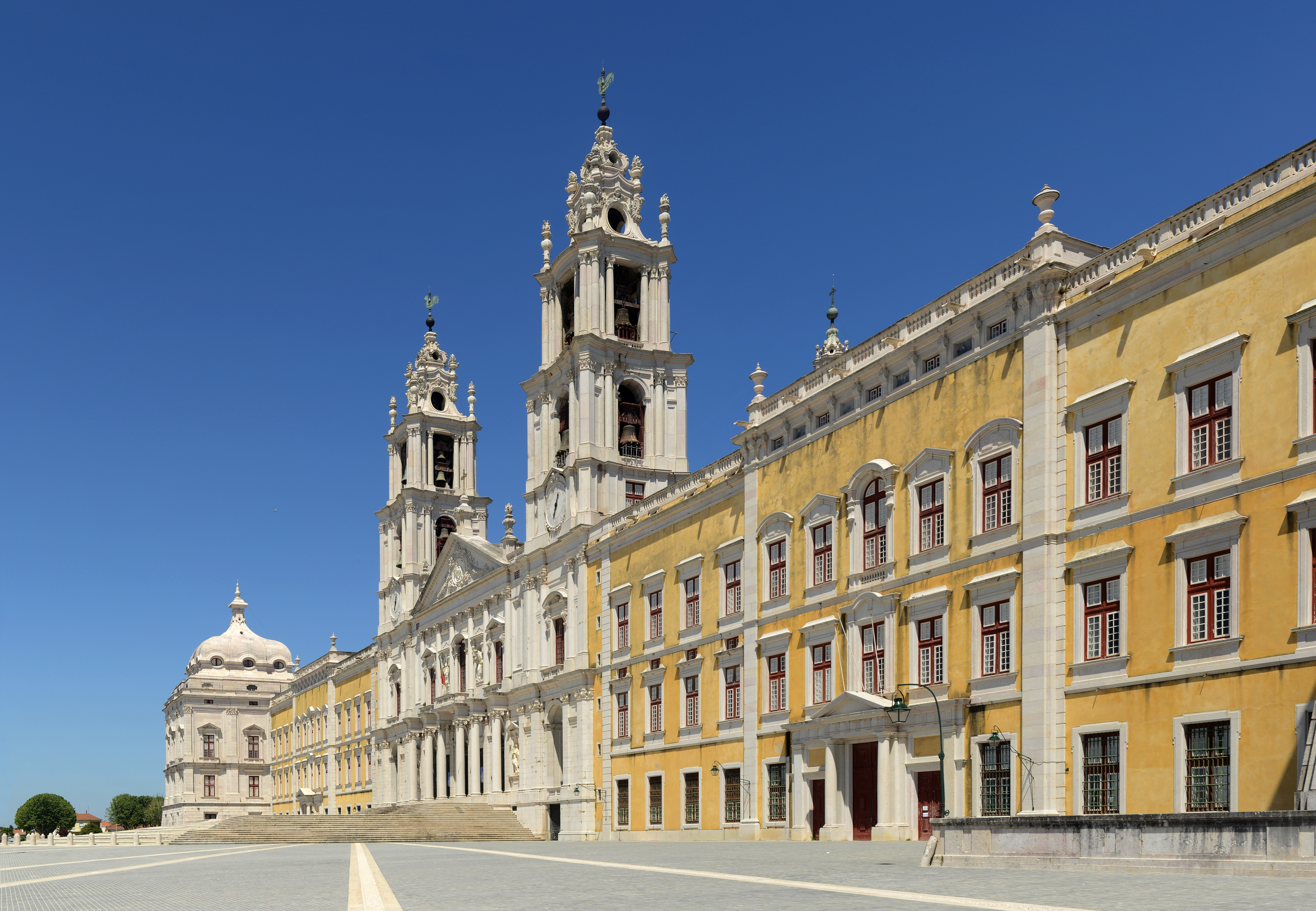
Mafra National Palace, Mafra

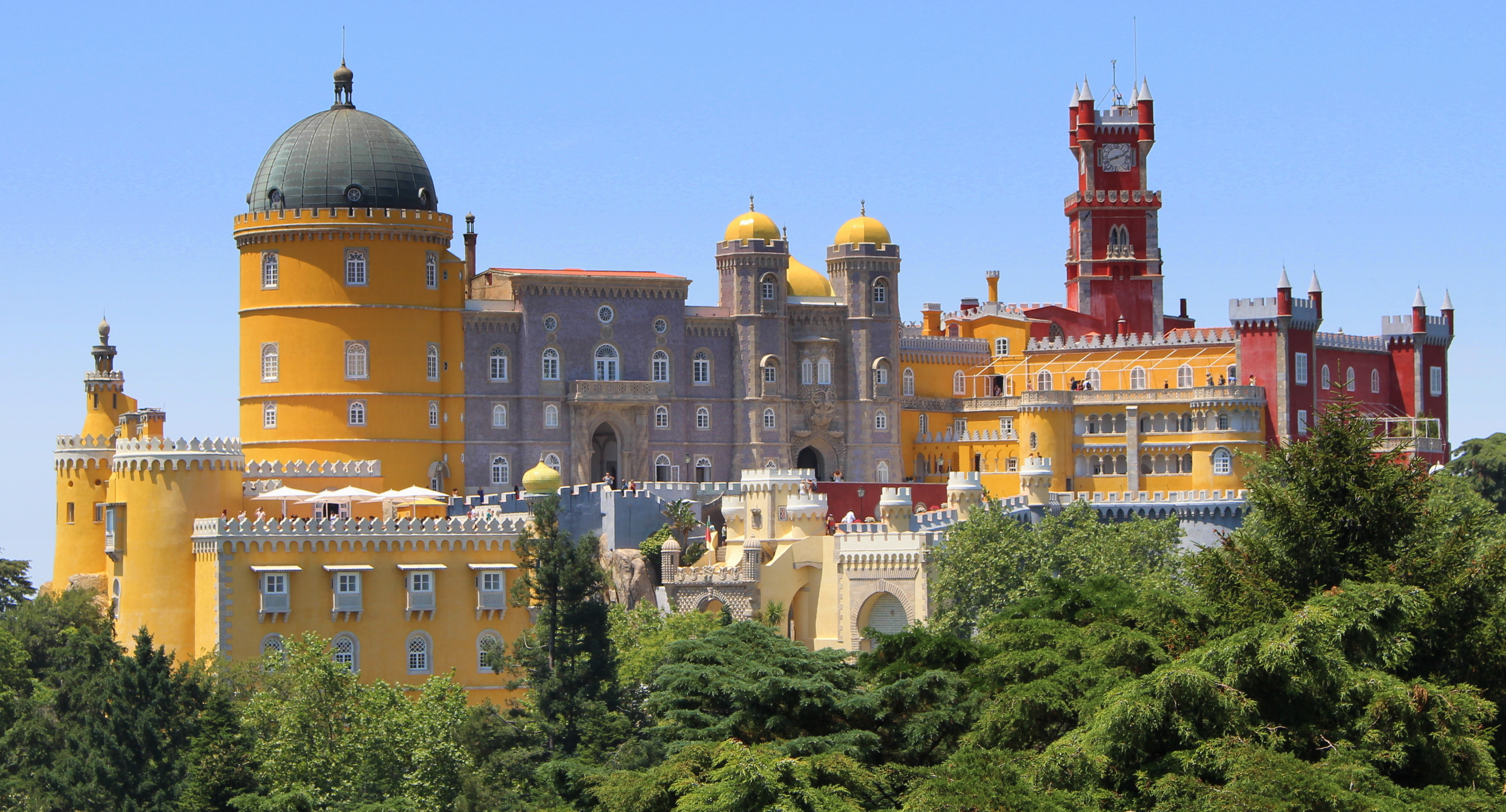
Pena National Palace, Sintra

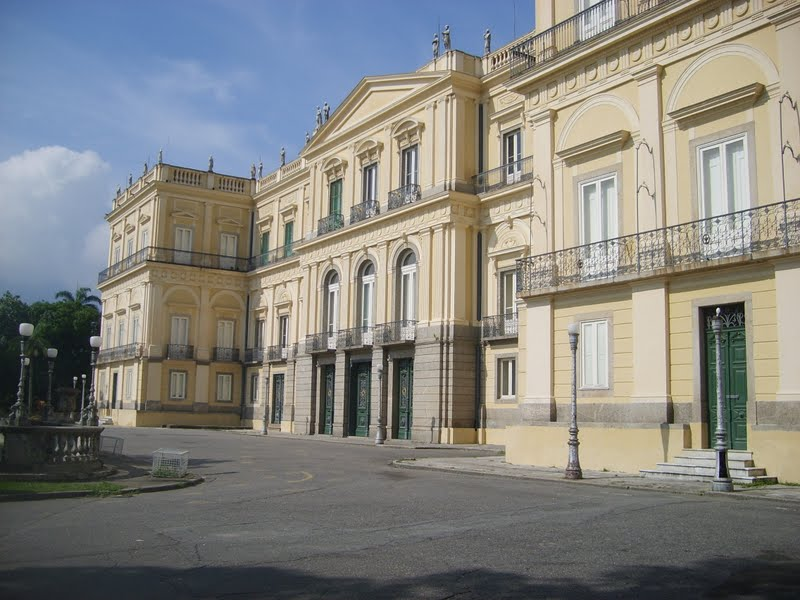
Paço de São Cristóvão, Rio de Janeiro

Palace of Queluz, Sintra

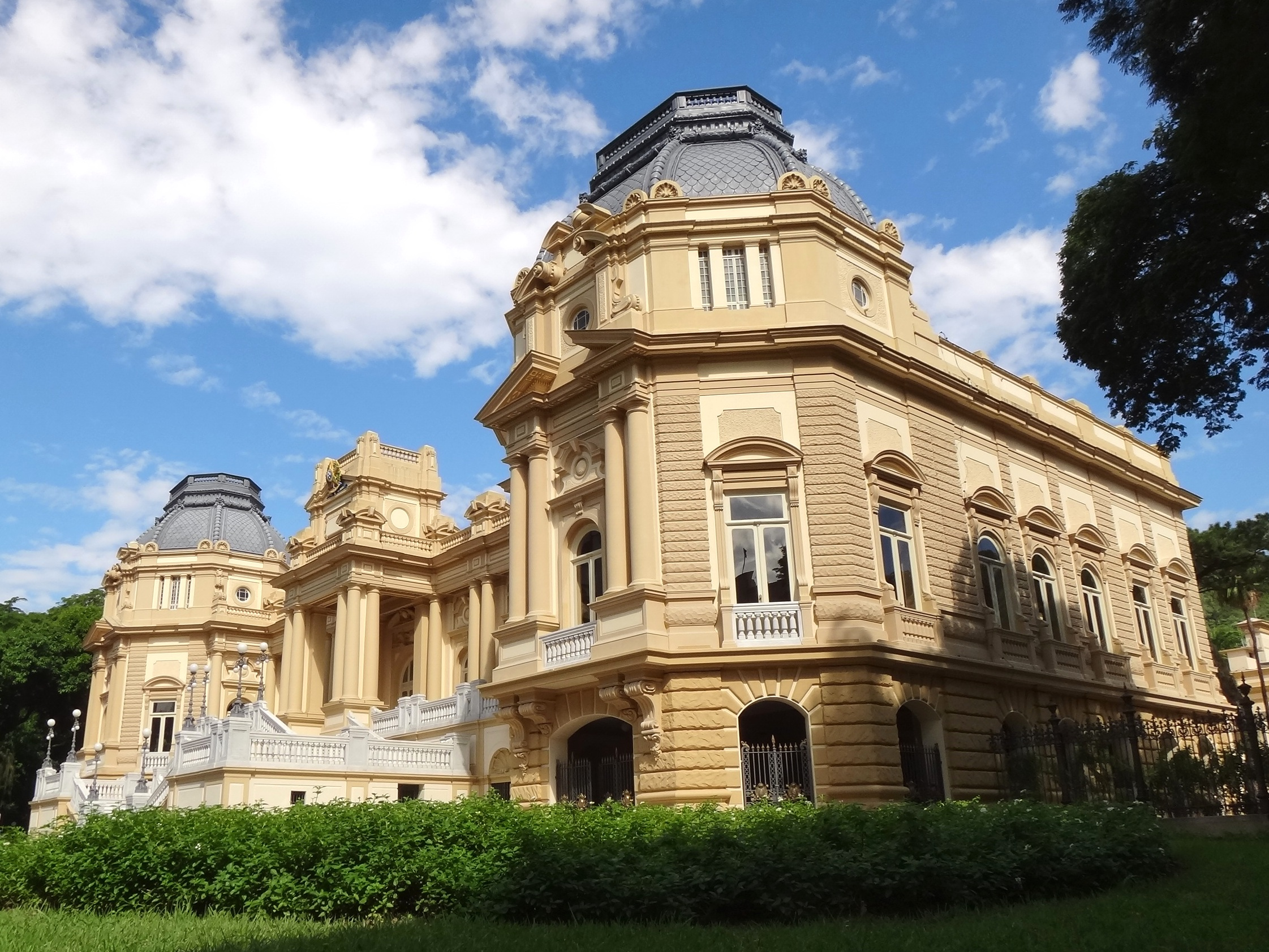
Guanabara Palace, Rio de Janeiro

Sintra National Palace, Sintra

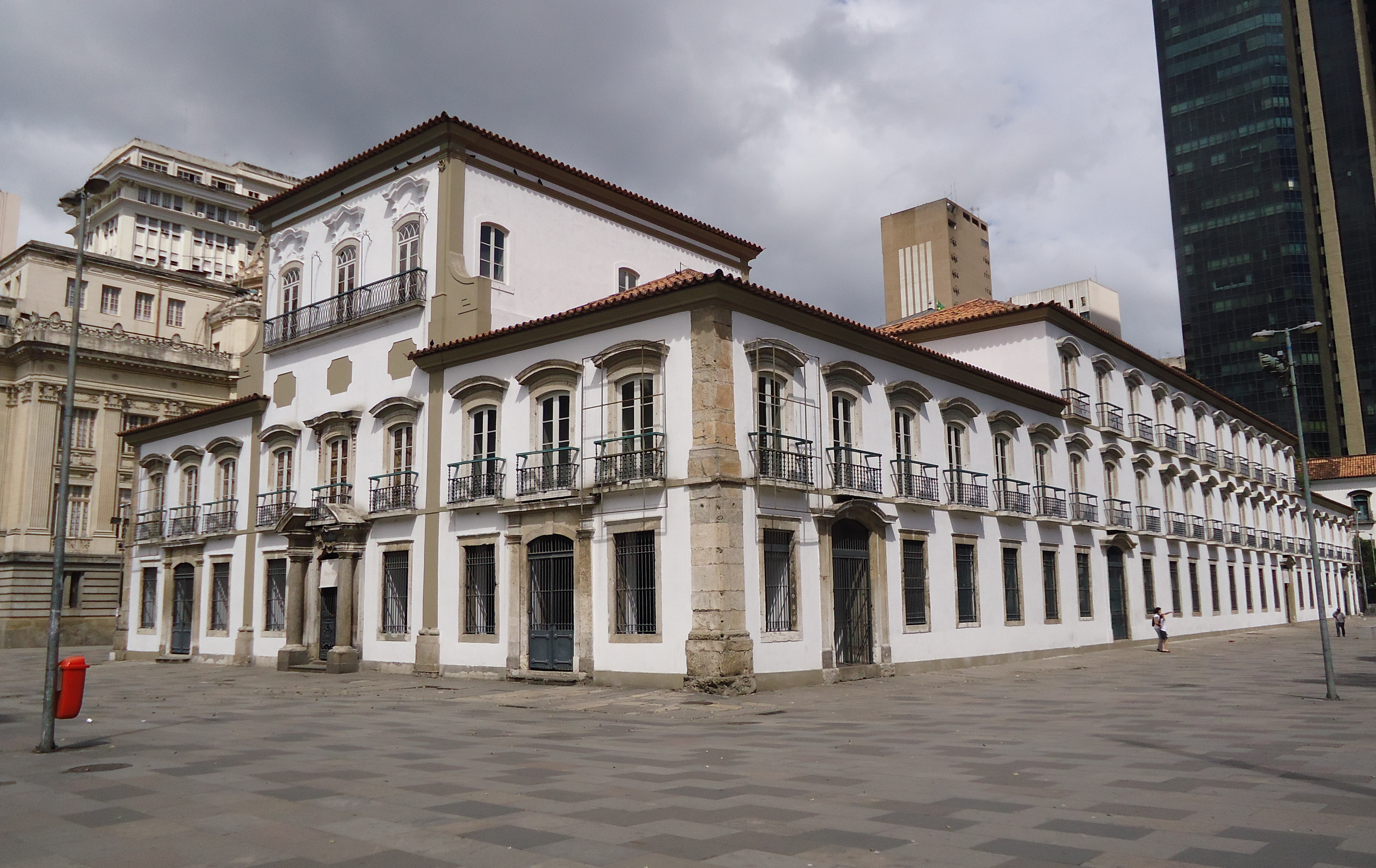
Paço Imperial, Rio de Janeiro

=== Armorial ===
Coat of arms	Title	Tenure	Coat of arms	Title	Tenure	Coat of arms	Title	Tenure
	Emperor of Brazil	1822–1889		King of the United Kingdom of Portugal, Brazil, and the Algarves	1815–1825		King of Portugal	1640–1910
	King of the Algarves	1640–1910		Prince of Portugal; Prince of Brazil; Prince Royal of Portugal	1481–present (Note: Title currently held by Duarte Pio, Duke of Braganza)		Prince of Beira	1734–present (Note: Title currently held by Afonso, Prince of Beira)
	Prince Imperial of Brazil	1822–1889		Duke of Braganza; Duke of Guimarães; Duke of Barcelos; Marquis of Vila Viçosa	1442–present (Note: Titles currently held by Duarte Pio, Duke of Braganza and Afonso, Prince of Beira)		Duke of Porto	1833–present (Note: Title currently held Infante Dinis, Duke of Porto)
	Duke of Viseu	1909–present (Note: Title currently held by Infante Miguel, Duke of Viseu)		Duke of Coimbra	1847–present (Note: Title currently held by Infante Maria Francisca, Duchess of Coimbra)		Count of Ourém; Count of Neiva; Count of Faria	1451–present

== Genealogy ==
=== Ducal line: Afonso I to Teodósio II (1377–1630) ===
Genealogical tree of the House of Braganza, during its ducal period, from origins of its founder, Afonso I, Duke of Braganza, to the issue of its last noble duke, Teodósio II, Duke of Braganza:

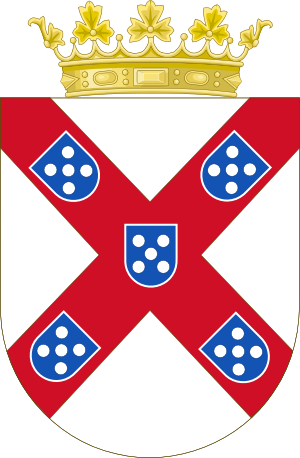
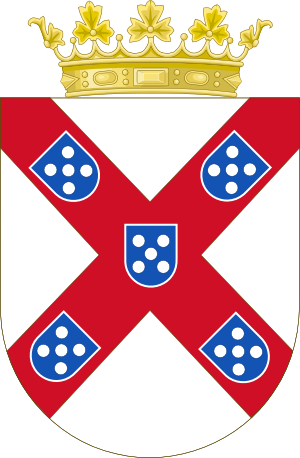
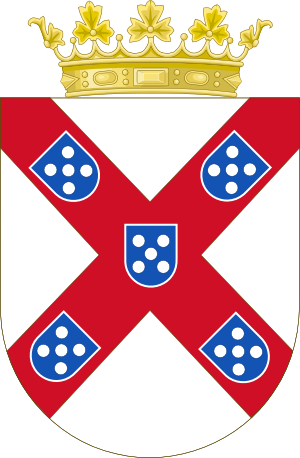
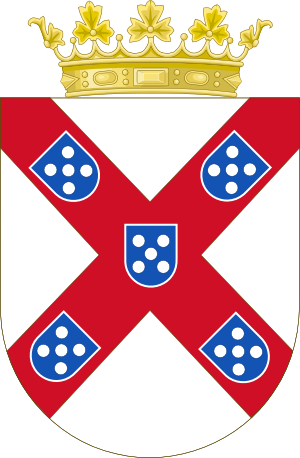
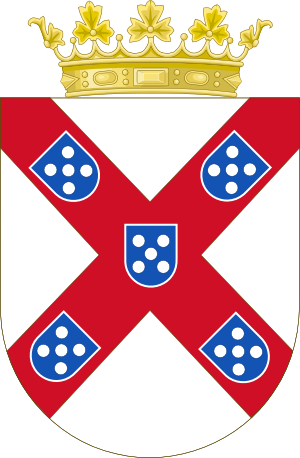
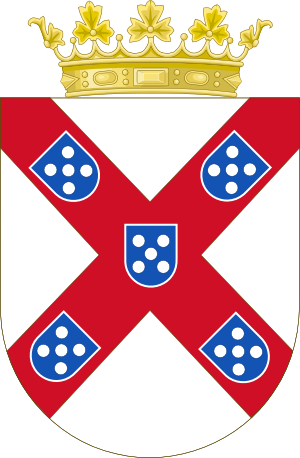
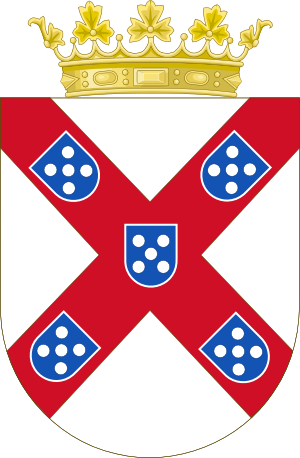
King Pedro I King of Portugal and the Algarve (1320–1367) Member of the Portuguese House of Burgundy
King João I King of Portugal and the Algarve (1357–1433) Founder of the House of Aviz
Afonso I 1st Duke of Braganza, 8th Count of Barcelos (1377–1461) Founder of the House of Braganza
Afonso of Braganza; 1st Marquis of Valença (1400–1460)	Fernando I 2nd Duke of Braganza, 1st Marquis of Vila Viçosa (1403–1478)	Isabel of Braganza; Infanta of Portugal (1402–1466)	Infante João; Constable of Portugal (1400–1442)
From his issue descend the lines of the Counts of Vimioso and the Marquises of Valença	João of Braganza; 1st Marquis of Montemor-o-Novo (1430–1484)	Fernando II; 3rd Duke of Braganza, 1st Duke of Guimarães (1430–1483)	Álvaro of Braganza; Lord of Cadaval (1440–1504)	Afonso of Braganza; 1st Count of Faro (1435–1483)	Infanta Beatriz; Duchess of Viseu (1430–1506)
Dinis of Braganza; 6th Count of Lemos (1481–1516)	Jaime I 4th Duke of Braganza, 2nd Duke of Guimarães (1479–1532)	From his issue descend the lines of the Dukes of Aveiro and the House of Cadaval	From his issue descend the lines of the Counts of Faro and the Counts of Odemira	King Manuel I King of Portugal and the Algarves (1469–1521)
From his issue descend the lines of the Counts of Lemos, the Dukes of Berwick, and the Dukes of Veragua in Spain and the Counts of Santa Cruz, the Marquesses of Gouvêa and the Marquesses of Lavradio in Portugal.	Isabel of Lencastre; Duchess of Braganza (1513–1558)	Teodósio I 5th Duke of Braganza, 3rd Duke of Guimarães (1510–1563)	Constantino of Braganza; Viceroy of India (1528–1575)	Isabel of Braganza; Duchess of Guimarães (1514–1576)	Infante Duarte; 4th Duke of Guimarães (1515–1540)
João I 6th Duke of Braganza, 1st Duke of Barcelos (1543–1583)	Infanta Catarina; Duchess of Braganza (1540–1614)
Teodósio II; 7th Duke of Braganza, 2nd Duke of Barcelos (1568–1630)	Duarte of Braganza; 1st Marquis of Frechilla (1569–1627)
Duarte of Braganza; Lord of Vila do Conde (1605–1649)	King João IV; King of Portugal and the Algarves; 8th Duke of Braganza, 6th Duke of Guimarães (1604–1656)	From him descend the lines of the Dukes of Frías and Escalona and the Marquises of Jarandilla and Villar de Grajanejos.

=== Royal line: João IV to João VI (1604–1826) ===
Genealogical tree of the House of Braganza, from its first monarch, João IV, King of Portugal, to the fracture of the house into its three main branches, in the issue of João VI, King of United Kingdom of Portugal, Brazil, and the Algarves:

King João IV; King of Portugal and the Algarves; 8th Duke of Braganza (1604–1656)
Prince Teodósio; 1st Prince of Brazil (1634–1653)	King Afonso VI; King of Portugal and the Algarves (1643–1683)	King Pedro II; King of Portugal and the Algarves (1648–1706)	Princess Joana; 1st Princess of Beira (1635–1653)	Queen Catarina; Queen Consort of England (1638–1705)
Infante Francisco; Duke of Beja (1691–1742)	Infante António; Infante of Portugal (1695–1775)	Infanta Francisca Josefa; Infanta of Portugal (1699–1736)	King João V King of Portugal and the Algarves (1689–1750)	Infante Manuel; Count of Ourém (1697–1766)	Princess Isabel Luísa; Princess of Beira (1669–1690)	Luísa of Braganza; Duchess of Cadaval (1679–1732)	José of Braganza; Archbishop of Braga (1703–1756)	Miguel of Braganza; Duke of Lafões (1699–1724)
João of Braganza; Duke of Abrantes (1726–1780)	Infante Carlos; Infante of Portugal (1716–1736)	King José I King of Portugal and the Algarves (1714–1777)	Queen Barbara; Queen Consort of Spain (1711–1758)	José of Braganza; High-Inquisitor of Portugal (1720–1801)	Gaspar of Braganza; Archbishop of Braga (1715–1789)	From his issue descend the lines of the Dukes of Lafões, the Marquises of Marialva and of Arronches
King Peter III; King of Portugal and the Algarves; 3rd Lord of the Infantado (1717–1786)	Queen Maria I Queen of Portugal and the Algarves; Queen of Brazil (1734–1816)	Infanta Maria Ana; Infanta of Portugal (1736–1813)	Infanta Doroteia; Infanta of Portugal (1739–1771)
Infanta Mariana; Infanta of Portugal; Infanta of Spain (1768–1788)	King João VI; King of Portugal and the Algarves; King and Emperor of Brazil (1767–1826)	Prince José; Prince of Brazil; Prince of Beira (1761–1788)	Princess Benedita; Princess of Brazil; Princess of Beira (1746–1829)
Infante Pedro; Infante of Portugal; Infante of Spain (1786–1812)	Princess Teresa; Princess of Beira; Countess of Molina (1793–1874)	King Miguel I King of Portugal and the Algarves; Duke of Braganza (1802–1866)	Emperor-King Pedro I/IV; King of Portugal and the Algarves; Emperor of Brazil (1798–1834)	Queen Maria Isabel; Queen Consort of Spain; Infanta of Portugal (1787–1818)	Infanta Assunção; Infanta of Portugal (1805–1834)	Infanta Francisca; Infanta of Portugal; Infanta of Spain (1800–1834)	Infanta Isabel; Regent of Portugal; Infanta of Portugal (1801–1876)	Infanta Ana de Jesus; Infanta of Portugal; Marquise of Loulé (1806–1857)
From their marriage descends the House of Bourbon-Braganza	From him descends the Miguelist branch of the House of Braganza	Queen Maria II; Queen of Portugal and the Algarves (1819–1853)	Emperor Pedro II; Emperor of Brazil (1825–1891)	From her marriage descends the House of Loulé
From her descends the Constitutional branch of the House of Braganza	From him descends the Brazilian branch of the House of Braganza

=== Imperial line: Pedro I to Pedro II (1798–1891) ===
Genealogical tree of the Brazilian branch House of Braganza, from its first monarch, Pedro I, Emperor of Brazil, to the issue of Pedro II, the last Emperor of Brazil.

Emperor-King Pedro I/IV; King of Portugal and the Algarves; Emperor of Brazil (1798–1834)
Queen Maria II; Queen of Portugal and the Algarves (1819–1853)	Princess Januária; Princess Imperial of Brazil; Countess of Aquila (1822–1901)	Emperor Pedro II; Emperor of Brazil (1825–1891)	Princess Paula; Princess of Brazil (1823–1833)	Princess Francisca; Princess of Brazil; Princess of Joinville (1824–1898)	Princess Maria Amélia; Princess of Brazil (1831–1853)
From her descends the Constitutional Line	Princess Isabel; Princess Imperial of Brazil (1846–1921)	Princess Leopoldina; Princess of Brazil; Princess of Saxe-Coburg and Gotha (1847–1871)
From her descends the House of Orléans-Braganza	From her descends the cadet branch of the Brazilian Imperial Family

==== Orléans-Braganza line: Isabel to Luiz and Pedro Carlos (1846–Present) ====
Genealogical tree of the House of Orléans-Braganza, from its origin to the current claimants:

Vassouras line: The descendants of Prince Luís of Orléans-Braganza

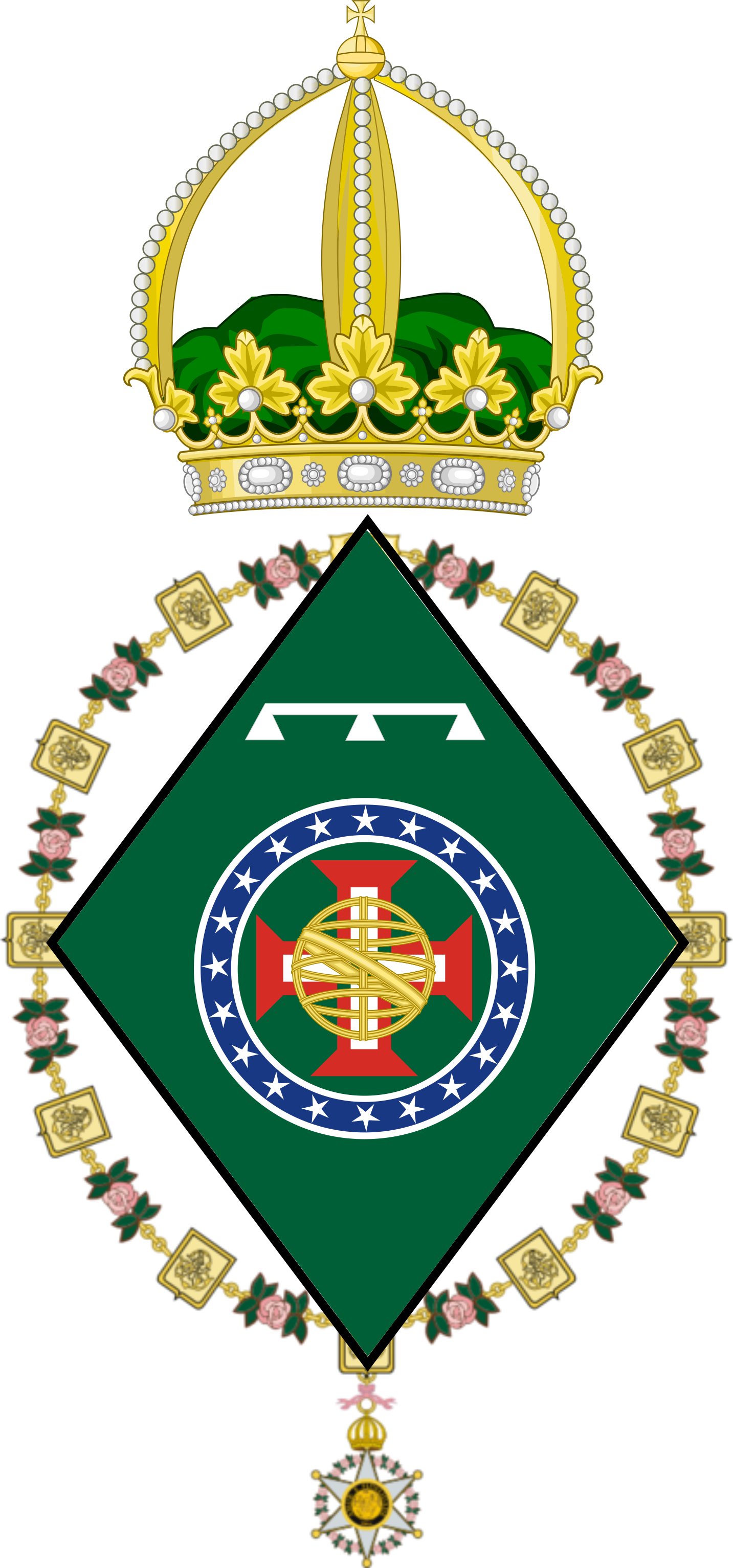
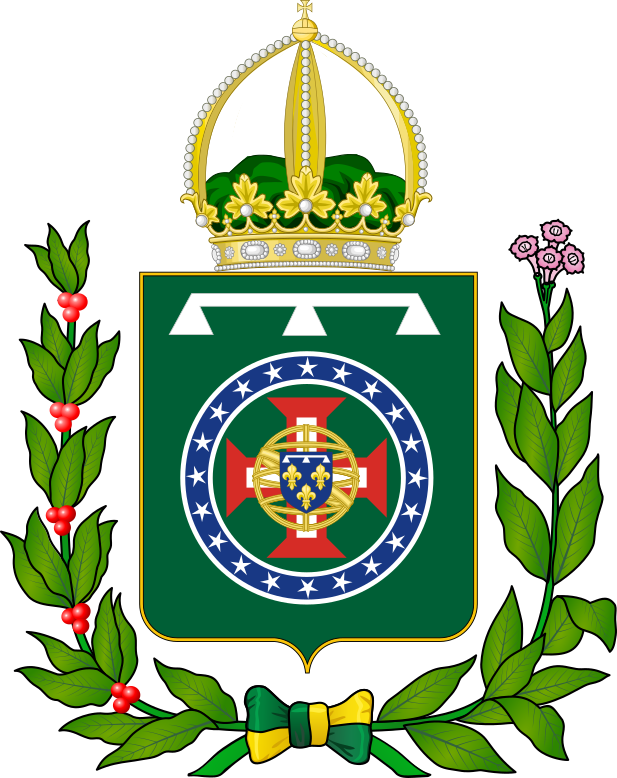
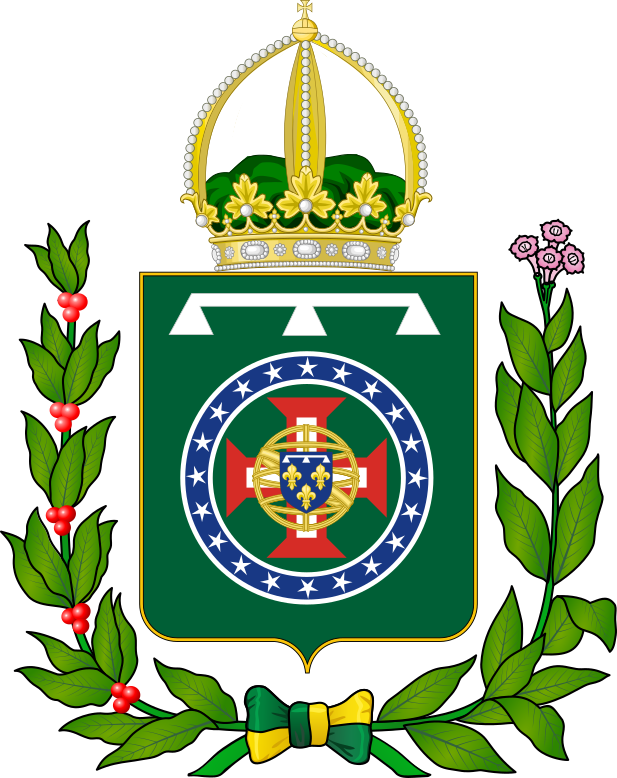
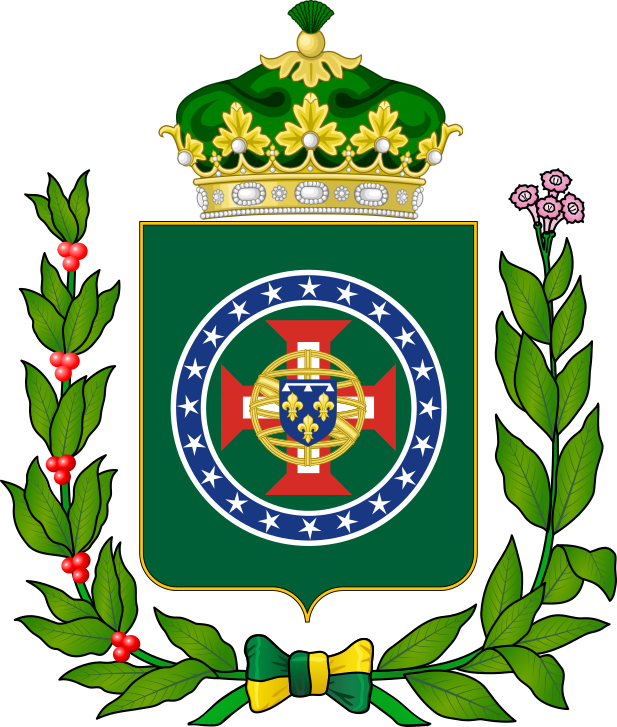
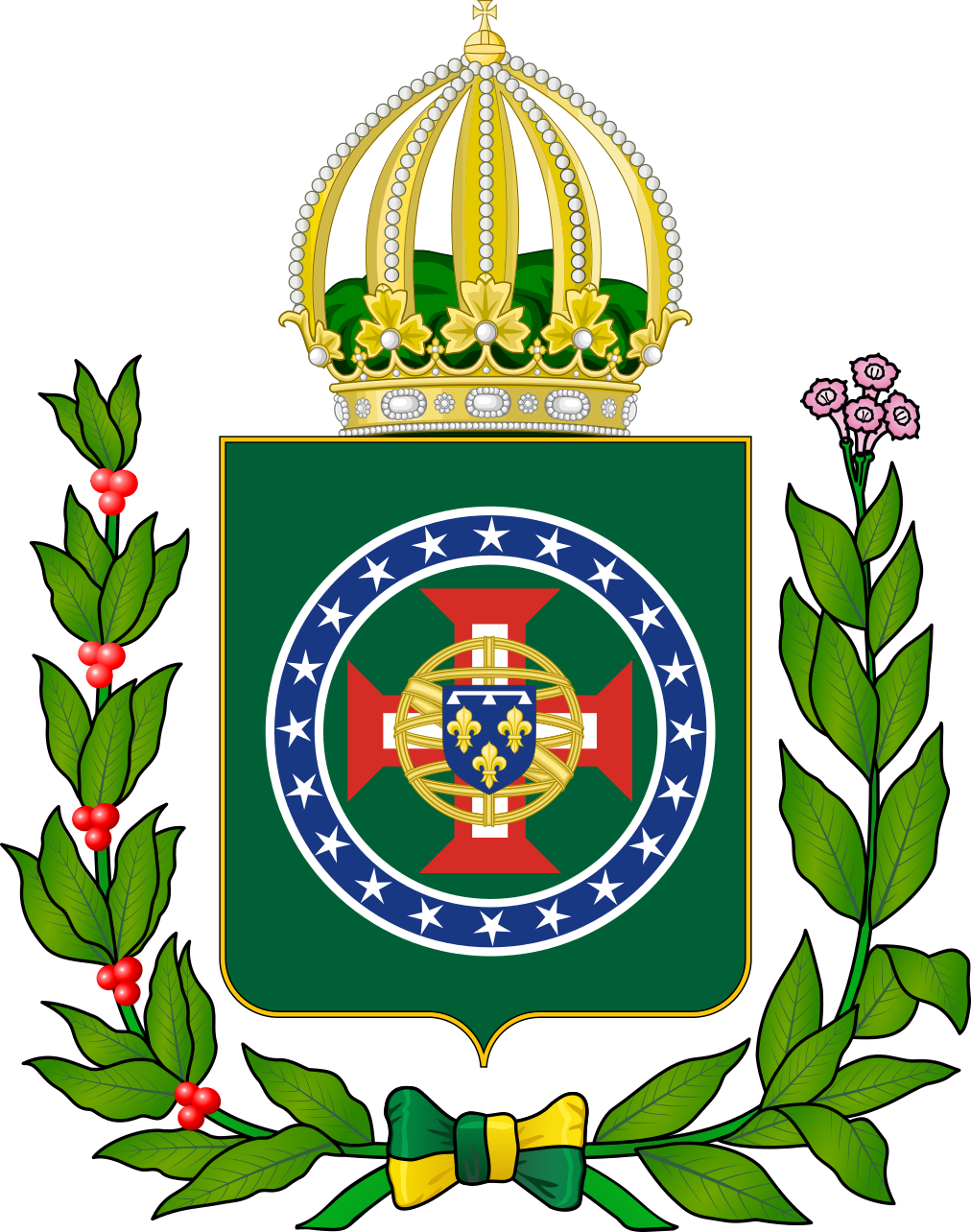
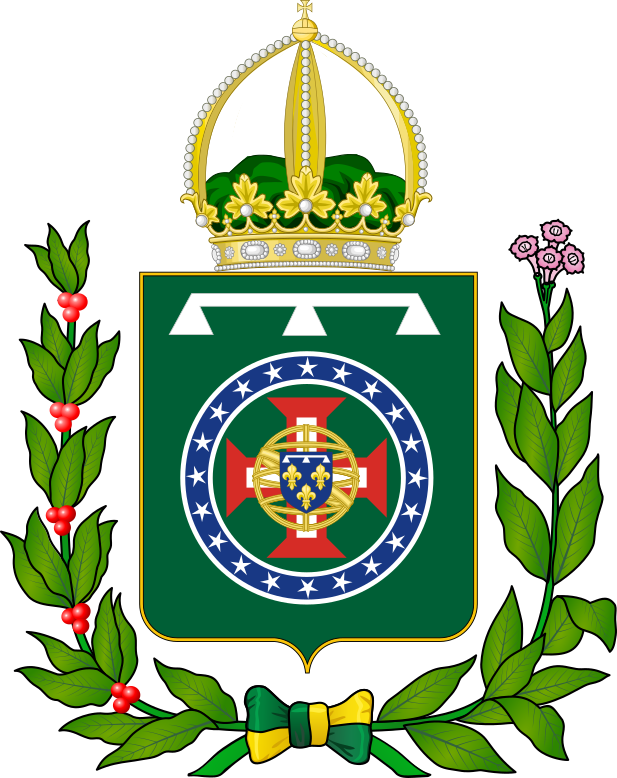
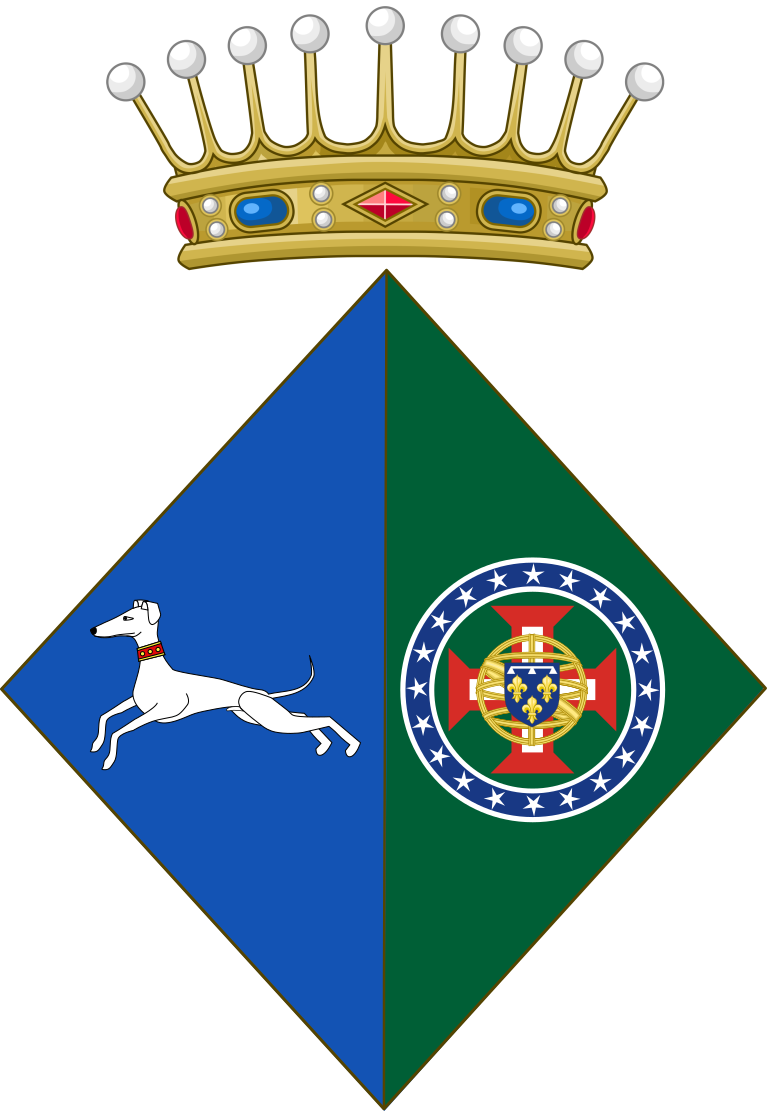
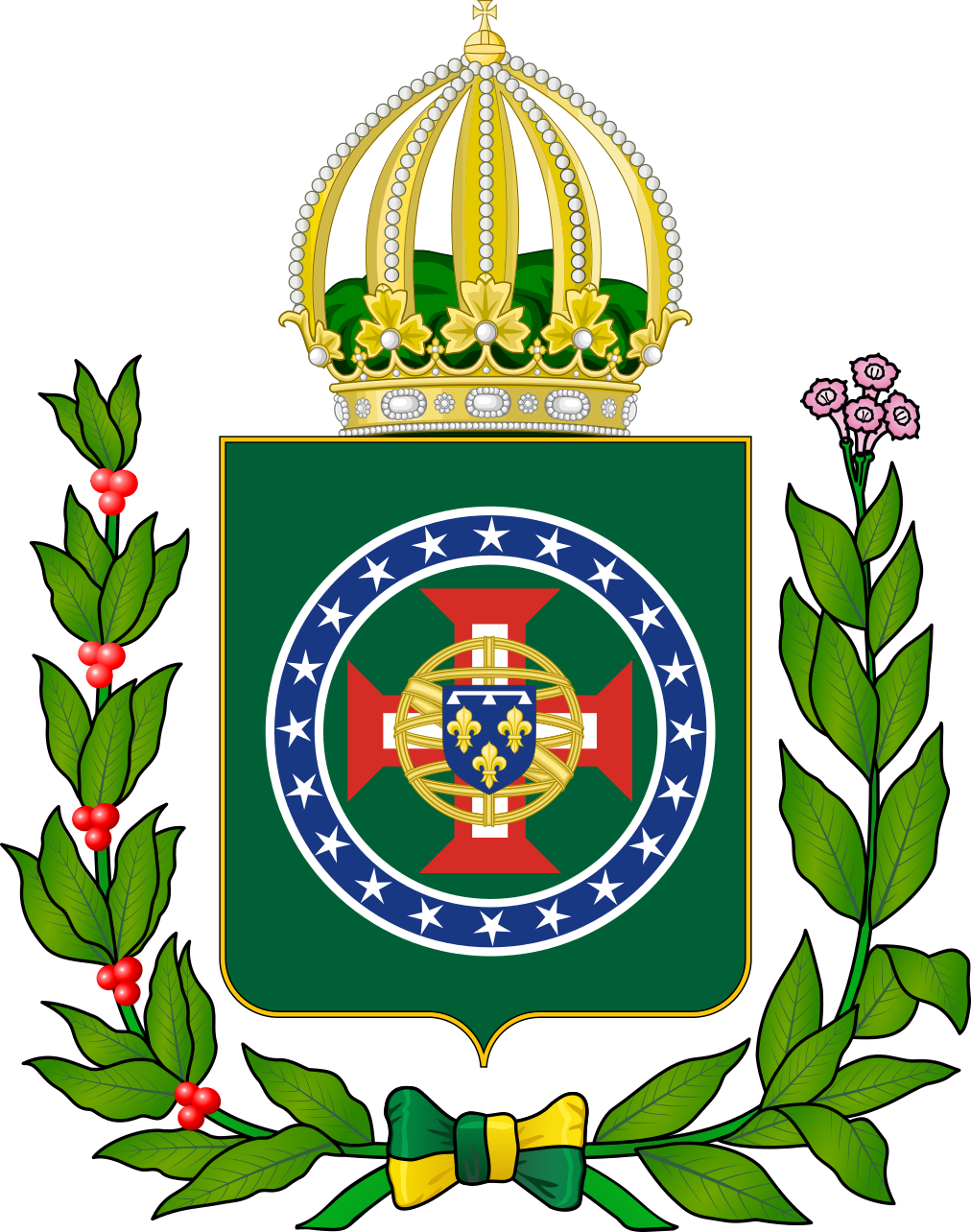
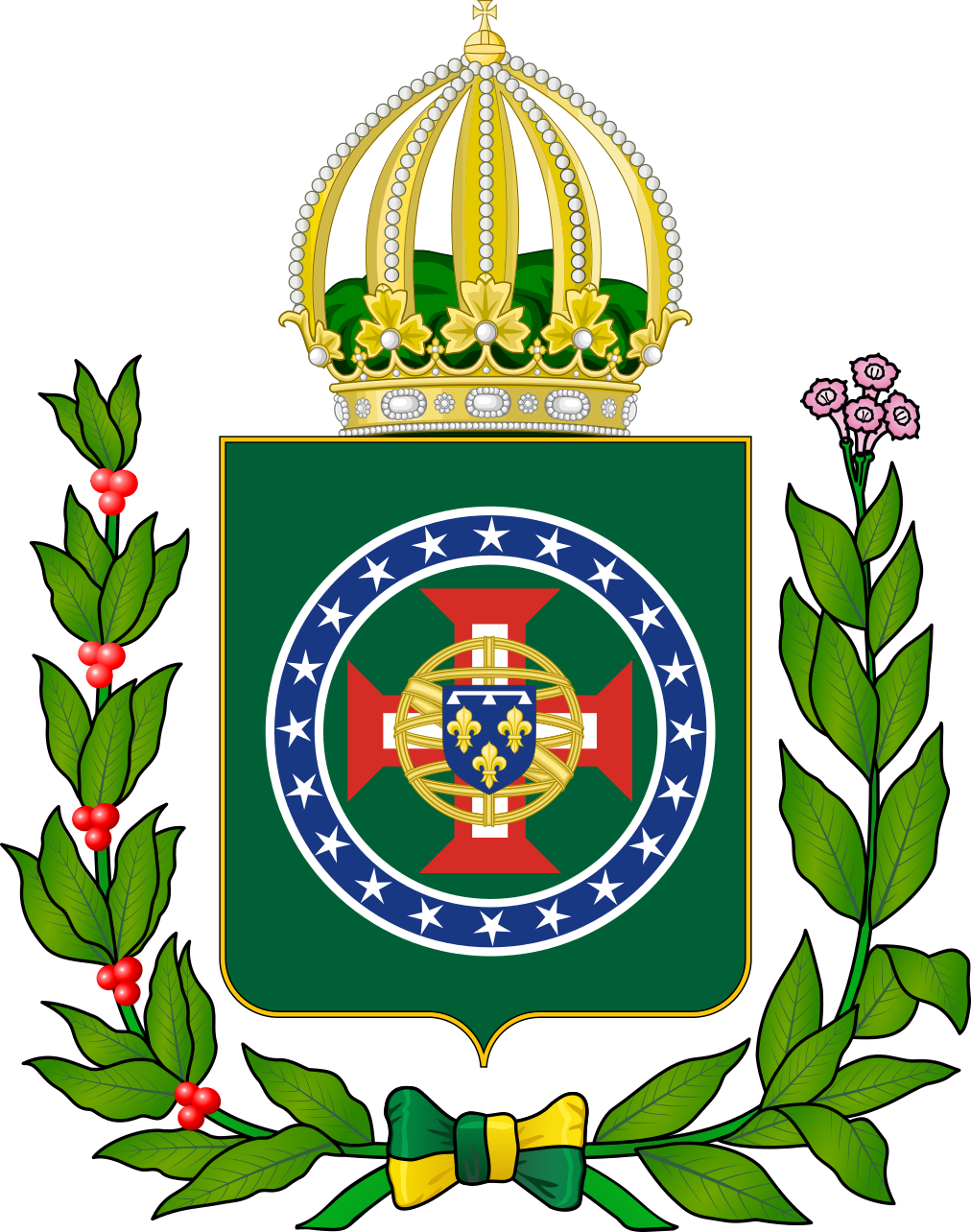
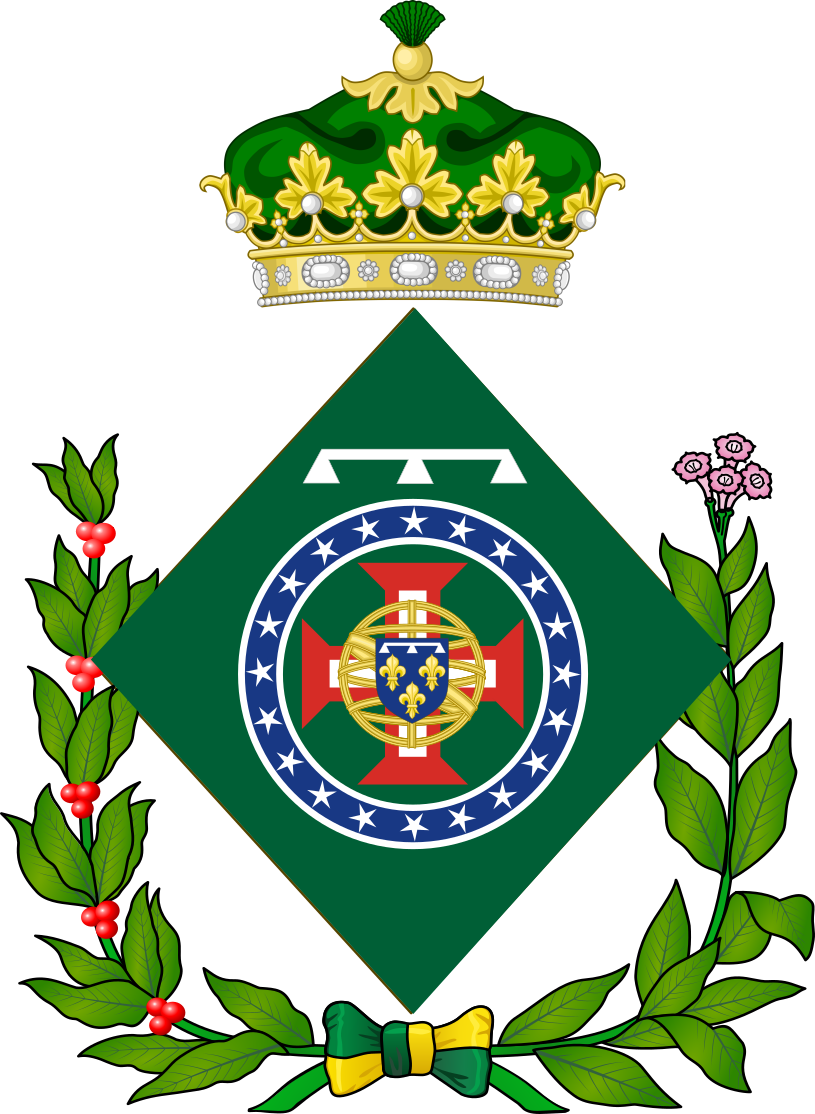
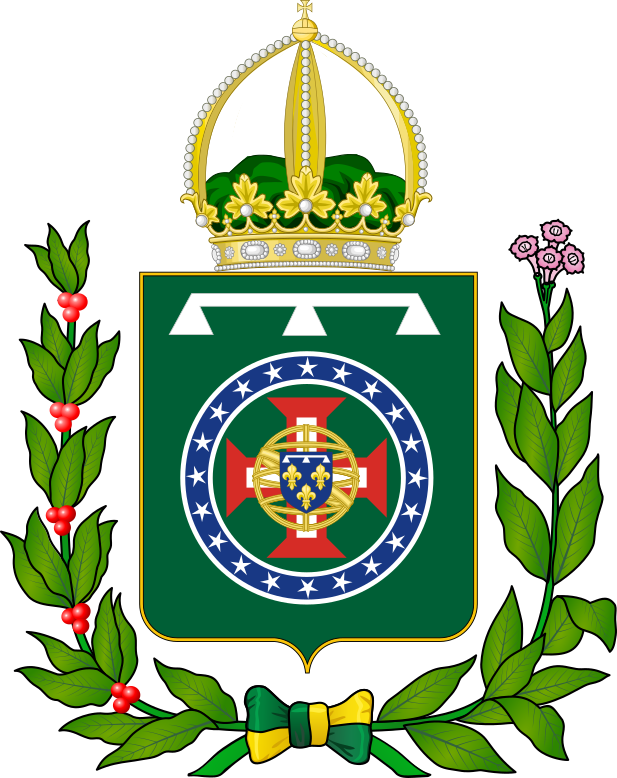
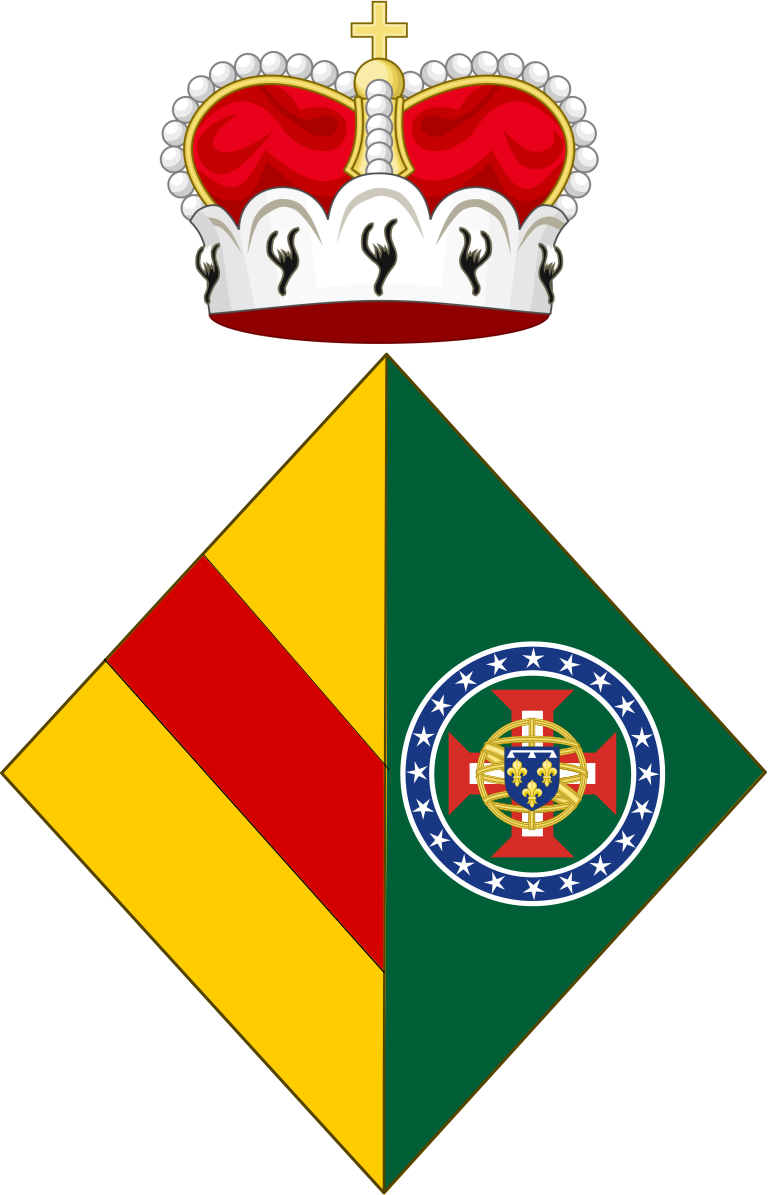
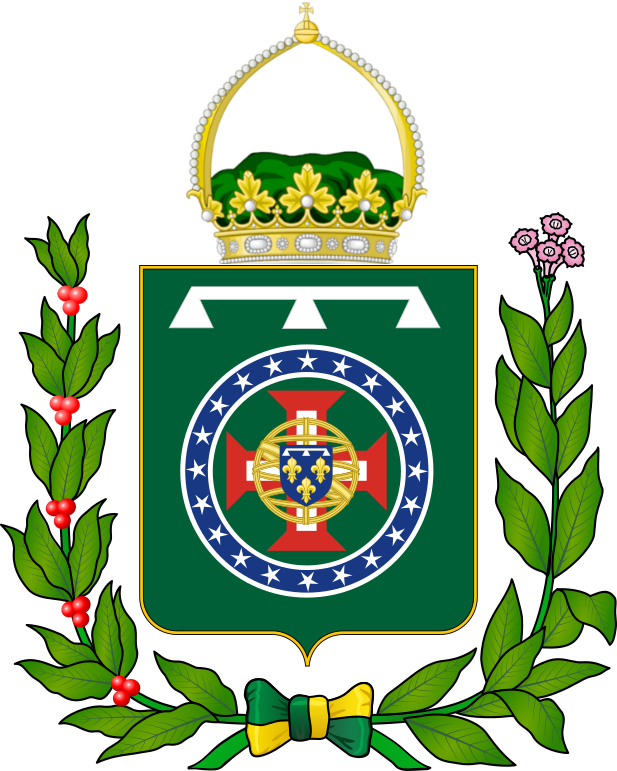
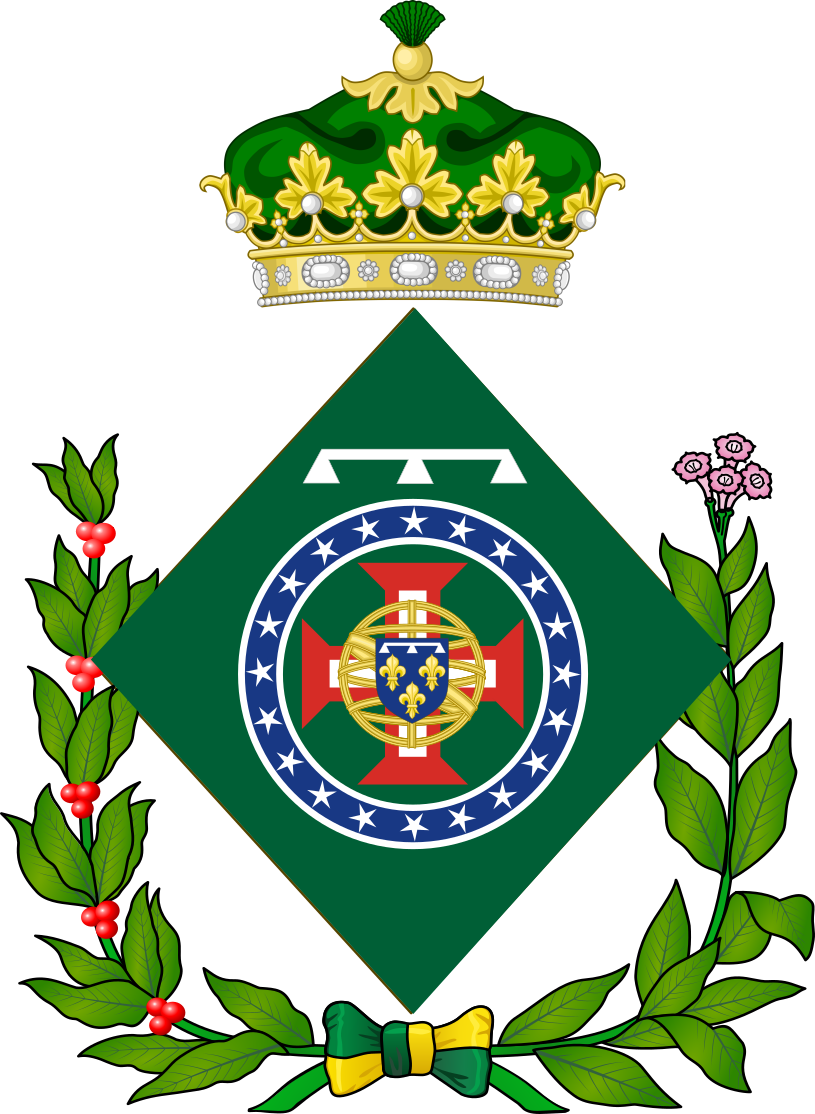
Princess Isabel; Princess Imperial of Brazil; Countess of Eu (1846–1921)
Prince Pedro de Alcântara; Prince Imperial of Brazil; Prince of Orléans-Braganza (1875–1940)	Prince Luís; Prince Imperial of Brazil; Prince of Orléans-Braganza (1878–1920)	Prince Antônio Gastão; Prince of Brazil; Prince of Orléans-Braganza (1881–1918)
Prince Pedro Henrique; Prince and Head of the House of Orléans-Braganza (1909–1981)	Prince Luiz Gastão; Prince Imperial of Brazil; Prince of Orléans-Braganza (1911–1931)	Princess Pia Maria; Princess Imperial of Brazil; Princess of Orléans-Braganza; Countess Nicolay (1913–2000)
Prince Luiz; Prince and Head of the House of Orléans-Braganza (1938–2022)	Prince Bertrand; Prince and Head of the House of Orléans-Braganza (b. 1941)	Princess Isabel; Princess of Brazil; Princess of Orléans-Braganza (1944–2017)	Prince Antônio; Prince Imperial of Brazil; Prince of Orléans-Braganza (b. 1950)	Princess Eleanora; Princess of Brazil; Princess of Orléans-Braganza; Princess of Ligne (b. 1953)	Seven more Princes of Orléans-Braganza who renounced their dynastic rights
Prince Rafael Antônio; Prince of Grão-Pará; Prince of Orléans-Braganza (b. 1986)	Princess Maria Gabriela; Princess of Brazil; Princess of Orléans-Braganza (b. 1989)

Petrópolis line: The descendants of Pedro de Alcântara, Prince of Grão-Pará

Princess Isabel; Princess Imperial of Brazil (1846–1921)
Prince Pedro de Alcântara; Prince of Grão-Pará; Prince of Orléans-Braganza (1875–1940)	Prince Luís; Prince Imperial of Brazil; Prince of Orléans-Braganza (1878–1920)	Prince Antônio Gastão; Prince of Brazil; Prince of Orléans-Braganza (1881–1918)
Princess Isabelle; Princess of Orléans-Braganza; Countess of Paris (1911–2003)	Prince Pedro Gastão; Prince of Orléans-Braganza (1913–2007)	Princess Maria Francisca; Princess of Orléans-Braganza; Duchess of Braganza (1914–1968)	Prince João Maria; Prince of Orléans-Braganza (1916–2005)	Princess Teresa Teodora; Princess of Orléans-Braganza (1919–2011)
Prince Pedro Carlos; Prince of Orléans-Braganza (b. 1945)	Princess Maria da Glória; Princess of Orléans-Braganza former Crown Princess of Yugoslavia (b. 1946)

=== Agnatic descendants of John IV ===
- John IV of Portugal
  - Teodósio, Prince of Brazil
  - Afonso VI of Portugal
  - Peter II of Portugal
    - João, Prince of Brazil
    - John V of Portugal
      - Pedro, Prince of Brazil
      - Joseph I of Portugal
      - Infante Carlos of Portugal
      - Peter III of Portugal
        - José, Prince of Brazil
        - John VI of Portugal
          - Francisco António, Prince of Beira
          - Pedro I of Brazil
            - Miguel, Prince of Beira
            - João Carlos, Prince of Beira
            - Pedro II of Brazil
              - Afonso, Prince Imperial of Brazil
              - Pedro Afonso, Prince Imperial of Brazil
          - Miguel I of Portugal
            - Miguel, Duke of Braganza
              - Prince Miguel, Duke of Viseu (renounced his succession rights)
                - John de Bragança (1912–1991)
                  - Miguel de Bragança (1951–)
                    - Miguel de Bragança (1986–)
                - Miguel de Bragança (1915–1996)
              - Prince Francis Joseph of Braganza
              - Duarte Nuno, Duke of Braganza
                - Duarte Pio, Duke of Braganza
                  - Afonso, Prince of Beira
                  - Infante Dinis, Duke of Porto
                - Infante Miguel, Duke of Viseu
                - Infante Henrique, Duke of Coimbra
      - Infante Alexandre of Portugal
    - Infante Francisco, Duke of Beja
    - Infante António of Portugal
    - Infante Manuel, Count of Ourém
    - Miguel de Bragança (illegitimate)
      - Dukes of Lafões

=== Non-agnatic branches ===
- Maria I of Portugal
  - John VI of Portugal
    - Pedro I of Brazil
      - Maria II of Portugal
        - House of Braganza-Saxe-Coburg and Gotha
      - Pedro II of Brazil
        - Isabel, Princess Imperial of Brazil
          - House of Orléans-Braganza
  - Infanta Maria Ana Vitória of Portugal
    - House of Bourbon-Braganza

== See also ==
- Descendants of John VI of Portugal
- Descendants of Miguel I of Portugal
- List of Portuguese monarchs
- List of Brazilian monarchs
- Curse of the Braganzas

== Sources ==
- Barbosa, Ignacio de Vilhena (1860). As cidades e villas da Monarchia portugueza que teem brasão d'armas: Volume I. Lisboa: Typographia do Panorama.
- Berry, William (1828). Encyclopaedia Heraldica or Complete Dictionary of Heraldry: Volume I. London: Sherwood, Gilbert and Piper.
- Brazil (1890). Collecção das leis do Brazil de 1812. Rio de Janeiro: Imprensa Nacional.
- Leal, Augusto Soares de Azevedo Barbosa de Pinho (1882). Portugal Antigo e Moderno; Diccionario: Volume X. Lisboa: Mattos Moreira.
- Marques, Antonio Henrique R. de Oliveira (1976). History of Portugal. Columbia University Press. ISBN 978-0-231-08353-9.
- McMurdo, Edward (1889a). History of Portugal. Vol. II. London: S. Low, Marston, Searle, & Rivington.
- McMurdo, Edward (1889b). History of Portugal. Vol. III. London: S. Low, Marston, Searle, & Rivington.
- Newitt, Malyn (2019). The Braganzas: The Rise and Fall of the Ruling Dynasties of Portugal and Brazil, 1640–1910. Reaktion Books. ISBN 978-1-78914-165-8.
- Nicolas, Sir Nicholas Harris (1841). History of the orders of knighthood of the British Empire; of the order of the Guelphs of Hanover; and of the medals, clasps and crosses, conferred for naval and military services; Volume I. London: Pickering, Rodwell.
- Sousa, D. Antonio Caetano de (1736). Historia Genealogica da Casa Real Portugueza: Tomo II. Lisboa: Joseph Antonio da Sylva.
- Stephens, H. Morse (1891). The Story of Portugal. New York: G. P. Putnam's Sons.
- Zúquete, Afonso Eduardo Martins, ed. (1989). Nobreza de Portugal e do Brasil (in Portuguese). Vol. III (2nd ed.). Lisboa: Editorial Enciclopédia.

*Royal House* House of Braganza Cadet branch of the House of Aviz
Regnal titles
Preceded by House of Habsburg	Ruling House of the Kingdom of Portugal and the Algarves; 1640–1910	Monarchy Abolished; See First Portuguese Republic
New title	Ruling House of the Kingdom of Brazil; 1815–1822	Independence of Brazil; See Empire of Brazil
New title	Ruling House of the Empire of Brazil; 1822–1889	Monarchy Abolished; See First Brazilian Republic
Titles in pretence
Preceded by Itself as the reigning house	— TITULAR — Claimant House of the Portuguese monarchy 1910–present Reason for succession failure: Portuguese monarchy abolished	Incumbent
Preceded by Itself as the reigning house	— TITULAR — Claimant House of the Brazilian monarchy 1889–1921; Reason for succession failure: Brazilian monarchy abolished	Succeeded by House of Orléans-Braganza
