= Infante =

Title and rank given in the Iberian kingdoms of Spain and Portugal

Infante (Spanish: [iɱˈfante], Portuguese: [ĩˈfɐ̃tɨ]; f. infanta), also anglicised as "infant" or translated as "prince", is the title and rank given in the Iberian kingdoms of Spain (including the predecessor kingdoms of Aragon, Castile, Navarre, and León) and Portugal to the sons and daughters (infantas) of the king, regardless of age, sometimes with the exception of the heir apparent or heir presumptive to the throne who usually bears a unique princely or ducal title. A woman married to a male infante was accorded the title of infanta if the marriage was dynastically approved (e.g., Princess Alicia of Bourbon-Parma), although since 1987 this is no longer automatically the case in Spain (e.g., Princess Anne d'Orléans). Husbands of born infantas did not obtain the title of infante through marriage (unlike most hereditary titles of Spanish nobility), although they were occasionally elevated to the title de gracia ("by grace") at the sovereign's command.

While the title belonged by right to all sons and daughters of a monarch (even when they ceased to be children of the reigning sovereign), it was also often accorded to sons-in-law and male-line grandchildren of the sovereign (e.g., Prince Ferdinand of Bavaria, Infante Pedro Carlos of Spain and Portugal), sometimes to other agnates of the ruling dynasty (e.g., Infante Enrique, Duke of Seville), and to female-line relatives of the monarch (e.g. Infante Sebastian of Portugal and Spain, Infante Alfonso de Orléans-Borbón).

== History ==
Although the title is derived from the same root as "infant", in Romance languages the term may be more broadly interpreted to mean "child" (cf. French enfants de France), and historically indicated that the infante or infanta was the child of the nation's monarch.

Like the enfants de France, all infantes in the various Iberian kingdoms were princes of the blood royal, although since 1987 the Spanish sovereign may also confer the title infantado by decree upon a person (typically the spouse of an infante or infanta) who is not of royal descent.

== Spanish infantes ==
Heraldic crown of a Spanish infante

In the Spanish royal family, the dynastic children of the monarch and of the heir apparent are entitled to the designation and rank of infante with the style of Royal Highness (infantes by birth). A second category of infantes may be granted that title by royal decree (infantes by grace), but only bear the style of Highness. Previously, the title and rank of infante of Spain was often granted to relatives and in-laws of Spain's monarchs, but unlike those created under the 1987 decree, their dynastic wives were automatically infantas and bearers of the title were Royal Highnesses.

In addition, some distant relatives of Spanish sovereigns, usually children of infantes by grace, were accorded the "honours and treatment" of infante or infanta, but were not granted the title itself, Included in this category were the children of Infante Carlos de Borbón-Dos Sicilias' second marriage to Princess Louise d'Orléans, those of Infante Fernando de Bavaria y Borbón's marriage with Infanta Maria Teresa of Spain, and those of Infante Alfonso de Orléans-Borbón's marriage to Princess Beatrice of Saxe-Coburg and Gotha (e.g., Princess María de las Mercedes of Bourbon-Two Sicilies, Countess of Barcelona, Prince Alvaro de Orléans-Borbón, Duke di Galliera).

=== Current infantes of Spain ===
The current infantes of Spain are (by precedence):

- Infanta Sofía (daughter of King Felipe VI and Queen consort Letizia, younger sister of Leonor, Princess of Asturias, the heir presumptive);
- Infanta Elena, Duchess of Lugo (elder daughter of former King Juan Carlos I and former Queen consort Sofía);
- Infanta Cristina (younger sister of above);
- Infanta Margarita, Duchess of Soria (younger sister of former King Juan Carlos I)

== Portuguese infantes ==
Coronet of a Portuguese infante

Infante had no feminine form at first in Portugal and may be compared to the infanções of the lower Portuguese nobility, who were also cadets of their families with no prospect of inheriting the main possessions of the noble families to which they belonged, being distinguished in law by some prerogatives, but little patrimony.

Later, the word infanta emerged in Portugal as a feminised form applied to Portuguese princesses after the 16th and 17th centuries. Also, after Edward, King of Portugal, in the 15th century, the heir apparent and his eldest son, or daughter if there was no son, came to be styled "prince" or "princess". The first prince in Portugal was the future Afonso V, his eldest son, maybe adopting the French royal style by an English influence imported by Philippa of Lancaster's retinue.

After the accession of the House of Braganza to the throne, the honorific of "Most Serene" (Sereníssimo) was prefixed to the title of infante (Sereníssima for an infanta), since the complete appellation of this dynasty was "Most Serene House of Braganza" (Sereníssima Casa de Bragança), a style granted by the Pope. The style, however, does not seem to have been used with the title of Prince Royal.

=== Current infantes of Portugal ===
Portugal has been a republic since 1910. Close relatives of Duarte Pio, Duke of Braganza, head of the Portuguese royal house, using the title are:

- Infanta Maria Francisca, Duchess of Coimbra: Duarte Pio's 2nd child;
- Infante Dinis, Duke of Porto: Duarte Pio's 3rd child;
- Infante Miguel, Duke of Viseu: Duarte Pio's 2nd brother

Afonso, Prince of Beira, Duarte Pio's eldest son and heir apparent, is styled Prince of Beira, not infante.

== See also ==
- Cardinal-Infante (disambiguation)
- Portuguese monarchy
- Spanish monarchy
- Crown prince
- Category:Spanish infantes
- Category:Spanish infantas
- Category:Portuguese infantes
- Category:Portuguese infantas
- Category:Leonese infantes
- Category:Leonese infantas
- Category:Castilian infantes
- Category:Castilian infantas
- Category:Aragonese infantes
- Category:Aragonese infantas
