= Isabel de Herédia =

Spouse of Pretender to the throne of Portugal

- Duchess of Braganza
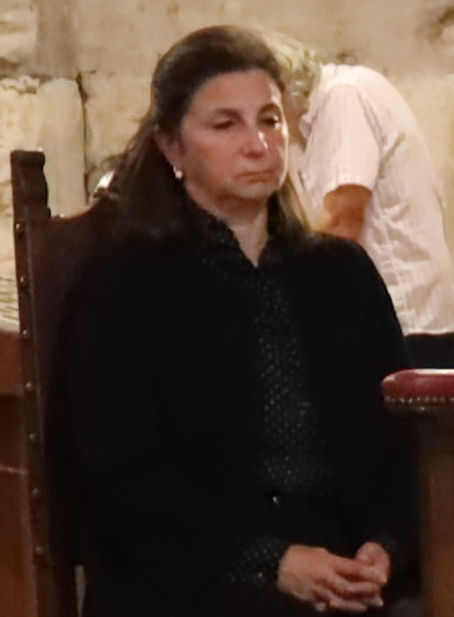
- D. Isabel in 2025, at the memorial Mass for the victims of the Ascensor da Glória derailment

Consort of the Royal House of Portugal
- Tenure: 13 May 1995 – present
- Born: 22 November 1966 (age 59); Lisbon, Portugal
- Spouse: Duarte Pio, Duke of Braganza (m. 1995)
- Issue: Afonso, Prince of Beira; Maria Francisca, Duchess of Coimbra; Dinis, Duke of Porto
- Father: Jorge de Herédia
- Mother: Raquel Leonor Pinheiro de Castro Curvello

Isabel, Duchess of Braganza (née Isabel Inês de Castro Curvello de Herédia; born 22 November 1966) is a Portuguese noblewoman and wife of Duarte Pio, Duke of Braganza, the current pretender to the defunct Portuguese throne.

Born into the family of an old Portuguese nobility, Isabel worked as an assets manager before to her marriage. Since marrying Duarte Pio, Isabel has ceased to have paid employment and become patron to several Portuguese charities and non-profit foundations. She and her husband have had three children together, securing the continuation of the House of Braganza.

== Family ==
Isabel Inês de Castro Curvello de Herédia was born on 22 November 1966, in Lisbon, to Dom Jorge de Herédia (b. 1934), an architect, and his wife, Dona Raquel Leonor Pinheiro de Castro Curvello (b. 1935).

She is a descendant in the male lineage of Francisco Correia de Herédia, 1st Viscount of Ribeira Brava (a Vitalício title, meaning Life peerage) and his wife Dona Joana Gil de Borja de Macedo e Meneses (1851-1925). Although Francisco was a member of the Portuguese nobility, he was a famed republican, who was involved in the failed republican uprising of 28 January 1908.

Isabel de Herédia is the first cousin of Manuel Caldeira Cabral, former Portuguese Minister of Economy.

== Early life ==
Isabel lived between metropolitan Portugal and Portuguese Angola until 1975, when Angola was granted independence. Her family subsequently moved to São Paulo, Brazil. There, she studied at the Colégio São Luís, a Jesuit-run institution. In 1990, she obtained a degree in business administration from the Fundação Getúlio Vargas and returned to Portugal to a job in BMF — Sociedade de Gestão de Patrimónios, S.A. She worked in investment management.

== Personal life ==
On 13 May 1995 she married Duarte Pio de Bragança, at Jerónimos Monastery. Present at the ceremony were representatives of various European royal and noble houses: Prince Philippe, Duke of Brabant, Prince Henri, Hereditary Grand Duke of Luxembourg and Infanta Margarita, Duchess of Soria, among others. The principal Portuguese political figures, including the President of the Republic Mário Soares, Prime Minister Aníbal Cavaco Silva and President of the Assembly António Barbosa de Melo, were also present.

Following her marriage and the birth of her first child, Afonso, Isabel resigned from her professional life and devoted herself to the management of her family, the family's assets and the patronage of various causes.

== Honours ==
=== National honours ===
- (Kingdom of Portugal) House of Braganza: Knight Grand Cross of the Royal Order of the Immaculate Conception of Vila Viçosa
- (Kingdom of Portugal) House of Braganza: Grand Mistress Dame Grand Cross of the Royal Order of Saint Isabel

=== Foreign honours ===
- (Kingdom of Montenegro) Montenegrin Royal Family: Dame Grand Cross of the Royal Order of Prince Danilo I
- Sovereign Military Order of Malta Dame Grand Cross of Honour and Devotion of the Order of Saint John
- (Kingdom of the Two Sicilies) Two Sicilian Royal Family: Dame Grand Cross of Justice of the Royal Order of Saint George

== Genealogy ==
=== Issue ===
Duarte Pio and Isabel of Heredia have three children:

Name	Birth	Notes
Afonso, Prince of Beira	25 March 1996	16th Prince of Beira, 18th Duke of Barcelos; 2nd in line in the succession
Maria Francisca, Duchess of Coimbra	3 March 1997	5th Duchess of Coimbra, Infanta of Portugal; 4th in line in the succession
Dinis, Duke of Porto	25 November 1999	4th Duke of Porto, Infante of Portugal; 3rd in line in the succession
