= Braganza =

Braganza may refer to:

- Bragança, a city in northeast Portugal sometimes called Braganza in English
- Francis Braganza (1922-2011), an Indian Jesuit priest, bishop of Baroda (Vadodara)
- House of Braganza, a Portuguese ducal and later royal House
  - Duke of Braganza, a Portuguese title that has been used for example by several heirs-apparent to the Portuguese throne
- Duchy of Braganza, a fief in medieval history of Portugal
- Braganza (company), a Norwegian holding E company
- Mr Renford Braganza or his widow, the claimant in the case of Braganza v BP Shipping Limited and another, a 2015 UK Supreme Court case addressing the concept of Wednesbury unreasonableness, or irrationality, in relation to employment law

== See also ==
- Bragança (disambiguation)
