= Afonso, Prince of Beira =

Heir to the defunct Portuguese throne (born 1996)

Afonso de Braganza
- Prince of Beira, Duke of Barcelos, (more)
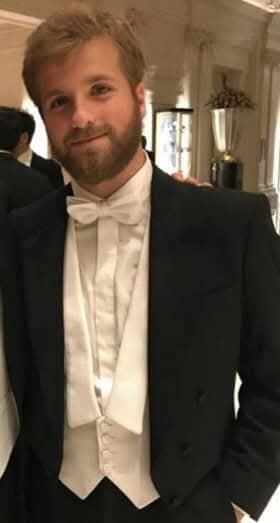
- Afonso in 2025
- Born: Afonso de Santa Maria Miguel Gabriel Rafael; 25 March 1996 (age 30); Lisbon, Portugal
- House: Braganza
- Father: Duarte Pio, Duke of Braganza
- Mother: Isabel de Herédia
- Religion: Roman Catholic

Dom Afonso de Braganza, Prince of Beira (born 25 March 1996), is the eldest son of Duarte Pio, Duke of Braganza and Isabel, Duchess of Braganza. Being the heir of the House of Braganza, he bears the courtesy title of Prince of Beira.

Afonso is a claimant to the succession of the defunct throne of Portugal, as second in line in the Miguelist branch of the House of Braganza, after his father Duarte Pio.

== Early life and education ==
Afonso de Santa Maria Miguel Gabriel Rafael de Bragança was born in Lisbon, the eldest child of Duarte Pio de Bragança, and Dª. Isabel Inês de Castro Curvello de Herédia. His baptismal name ends with Miguel Gabriel Rafael, a family tradition of the House of Braganza that honors the three archangels in the Catholic Church.

On 1 June 1996, in the Cathedral of Braga, Afonso was baptised by Eurico Dias Nogueira, Archbishop of Braga, Primate of all the Spains.

His godparents are Infanta Elena, Duchess of Lugo and his maternal uncle, Afonso Miguel de Herédia.

Immediately after his baptism at the Sé Cathedral of Braga, the young prince was consecrated in nearby Guimarães to Nossa Senhora da Oliveira, (Our Lady of the Olive Tree), where his ancestor King John I (founder of the House of Aviz), along with his illegitimate son Afonso, Duke of Braganza (founder of the House of Braganza), had been to thank her for his victory at the battle of Aljubarrota, in 1385, against his niece Queen Beatrice of Portugal and her husband John I of Castile.

Afonso was educated at St. Julian's School on the Portuguese Riviera, Colégio Planalto in Lisbon, and The Oratory School, a Catholic school in the United Kingdom.

He holds a bachelor's degree in Political Science and International Relations from the Catholic University of Portugal and a master's degree in Marine Economics from the NOVA University of Lisbon.

== Career ==
Afonso did professional internships at the Luso-American Chamber of Commerce, EDP and Accenture, and worked at an asset management company called Pury Pictet Turrenttini in Geneva.

== Succession ==
Afonso will be the next to succeed his father, Duarte Pio, as head of the House of Braganza.

In 2015, in keeping with Portuguese tradition, he was consecrated as heir apparent on his 18th birthday. The ceremony took place at the Sanctuary of Nossa Senhora da Lapa, in Sernancelhe.

== Public role ==
In recognition of his family's connections to East-Timor, particularly his father's role in supporting that country, Afonso was made an honorary Liurai in September 2014, when he and his family visited the country to attend the second Senate session of the Liurais Association, which represents the descendants of the island's tribal kings.

As a public figure, Afonso has interacted with European royalty and other public figures throughout his life. In 2017, he, his brother Dinis, and their parents accompanied their sister Maria Francisca to the Bal des débutantes in Paris.

In August 2018, Afonso joined as an intern in the Social and Pre-Hospitalar Emergency Department, the Voluntary Fire Brigade of Lisbon, following in the foot steps of Afonso, Duke of Porto, who was Honorary Commander of the same brigade. The decision to join the fire brigade came after discussing Portugal's summer fires with his family and friends.

Afonso regularly volunteers in activities in the interior of Portugal aimed at the environment. In 2019, he participated in a reforestation action in Cova da Beira.

He visited the Azores archipelago with his parents, Duarte Pio and Isabel de Herédia, in 2021. This visit included the islands of Faial, Pico, Terceira and São Miguel. In the city of Horta, on the island of Faial, they met with the President of the Legislative Assembly of the Autonomous Region of the Azores, representatives of the Parliamentary Groups and the President of the Regional Government of the Autonomous Region of the Azores.

== Awards with his name ==
Afonso has sponsored awards recognizing accomplishments in several areas.

The Prince of Beira Trophy is an equestrian award that was established in 2008. The winner in 2010 was Portuguese Olympic dressage rider Daniel Pinto, and Afonso presented him the award.

The Prince of Beira Award in Biomedical Sciences is an award that distinguishes researchers of excellence in the field of biomedical sciences; it is a partnership of the Universidade do Minho and the Municipality of Guimarães.

== Claimed titles ==
As well as being a claimant to the title of Infante of Portugal, Afonso de Bragança is a claimant to the title of Prince of Beira, as he is the first-born son of Duarte Pio, the heir apparent and first in line to the throne of Portugal. He is also a pretender to the titles of Duke of Barcelos and Duke of Guimarães.

== Honours ==
Foreign

- Knight Grand Cross of Honour and Devotion (Sovereign Military Order of Malta)
- Knight Grand Cross of the Order of the Holy Sepulchre (Holy See)

Dynastic

- Grand-Cross of the Royal Military Order of the Immaculate Conception of Vila Viçosa (Royal House of Portugal)
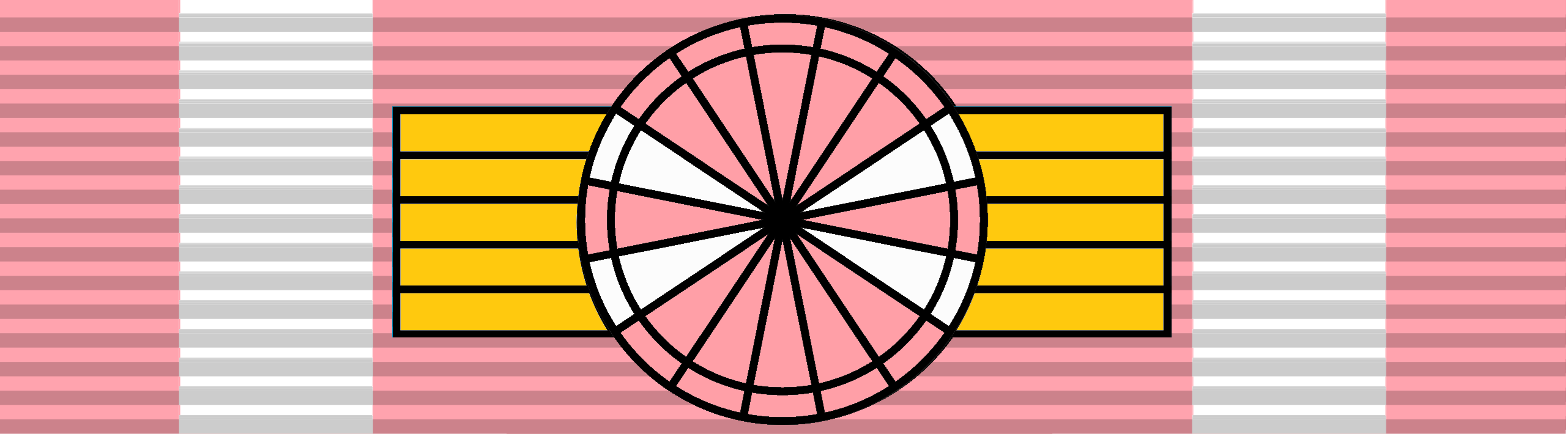
- Grand Cross of the Imperial Order of the Rose (Brazilian House of Orléans-Braganza)
- Knight Grand Cross of Justice of the Castroan-Two Sicilian Sacred Military Constantinian Order of Saint George (Castroan Royal Family of Two Sicilies)

== See also ==
- Royal House of Braganza
- Prince of Beira
- Duke of Barcelos
- Infante of Portugal

Afonso, Prince of Beira House of Braganza Cadet branch of the House of Aviz Born: 25 March 1996
Titles in pretence
Preceded by Duarte Pio	Prince of Beira; Duke of Barcelos; 25 March 1996	Incumbent
