= Duchy of Braganza =

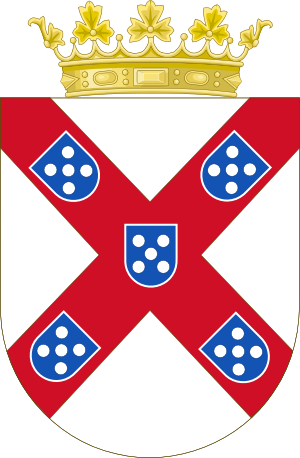
- Creation date: 1442
- Created by: John I of Portugal
- Peerage: Peerage of Portugal
- First holder: Afonso I of Braganza
- Present holder: Duarte Pio, Duke of Braganza
- Remainder to: Heir Apparent of the Throne of Portugal

The Duchy of Braganza (Portuguese: Ducado de Bragança) has been the fief of an important Portuguese noble family: the House of Braganza, and is one of the most important Dukedoms of Portugal. Created in 1442 by King Afonso V of Portugal for his uncle Afonso, Count of Barcelos (natural son of John I of Portugal), it is one of the oldest fiefdoms in Portugal.

After the accession of the House of Braganza to the Portuguese throne in 1640, following the House of Habsburg, the heir to the throne of Portugal was styled as the Duke of Braganza (see that article for further developments of the dukedom) together with Prince of Brazil, and later Prince Royal of Portugal. After the foundation of the Portuguese Republic in 1910, the tradition of the heir to the throne being titled Duke of Braganza was revived by some pretenders to signify their claims to the throne.

== History ==
The Duchy of Braganza, a Dukedom, was created in 1442 by king Afonso V of Portugal for his uncle Afonso, Count of Barcelos (natural son of John I of Portugal). Along with the duchies of Coimbra and Viseu created by John I for his sons Peter and Henry after their capture of Ceuta from the Moors in 1415, it is one of the first duchies of Portugal.

By 1640, Portugal was on the verge of rebellion and a new Portuguese king had to be found. The choice fell upon the eighth duke, John II of Braganza, who had a claim both through his grandmother, Infanta Catherine, and through his great-great-grandfather, the 4th duke, nephew of King Manuel. The duke was a modest man without particular ambitions to the crown. Legend says that his wife, Leonor of Guzman, daughter of the duke of Medina-Sidónia, urged him to accept the offer saying, I'd rather be Queen for one day than duchess for a lifetime. He accepted the leadership of the rebellion, which was successful, and was acclaimed John IV of Portugal on December 1, 1640.

After the accession of the Braganzas to the throne, the duchy was linked to the Crown and the Duke of Braganza became the traditional title of the heir to the Crown, together with or alternate to Prince of Beira, much as Prince of Wales is in the United Kingdom. The fief itself became merged in the crown.

== See also ==
- List of Portuguese monarchs
- Portuguese House of Burgundy
- House of Aviz
- House of Habsburg
- House of Braganza
- House of Braganza-Saxe-Coburg and Gotha
- Timeline of Portuguese history
