= Bragança =

Bragança may refer to:

== People ==
- Jaime Celestino Dias Bragança, a Portuguese footballer

== Politics and History ==
- House of Bragança - A Portuguese Royal House
- Duke of Bragança - A Portuguese noble, and later royal, title
- Bragança - One of the member constituencies of the Assembly of the Republic, the national legislature of Portugal.

== Places ==
=== Brazil ===
- Bragança, Pará, a municipality in the State of Pará
- Bragança Paulista, São Paulo, a municipality in the State of São Paulo

=== Portugal ===
- Bragança, Portugal, a city and municipality in the north-eastern district of Bragança
- Bragança District, a historical district in the Norte region of Portugal

== Sports ==
- G.D. Bragança, association football club based in Bragança Municipality

== See also ==
- Braganza (disambiguation)
