= Order of Saint Isabel =

Order of Saint Isabel Real Ordem de Santa Isabel
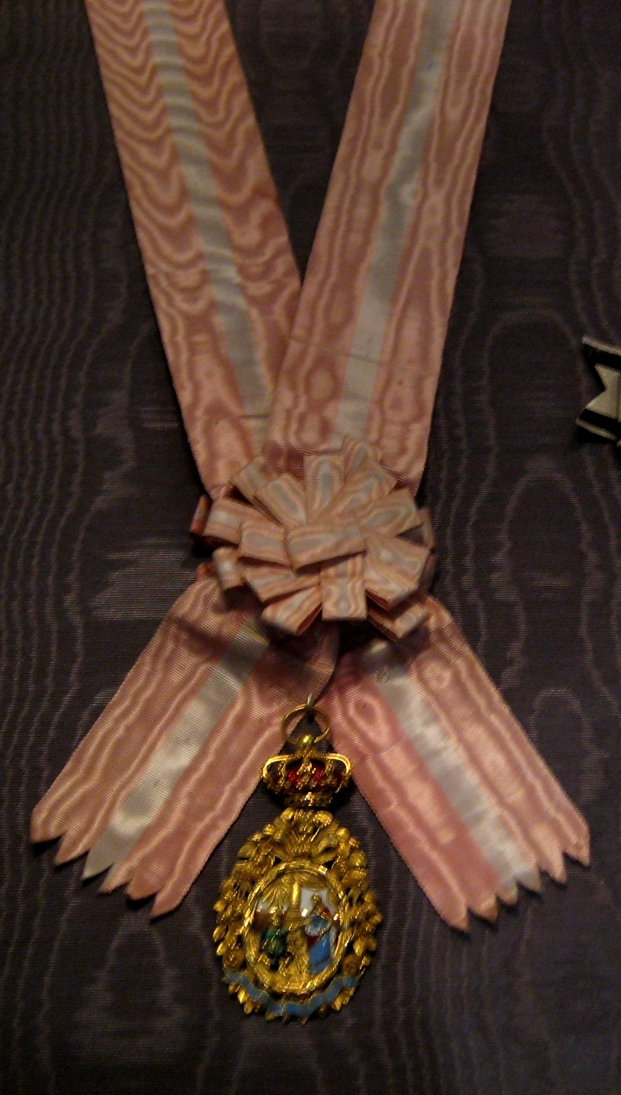
- Sash of the Order

Awarded by Duchess of Braganza
- Type: Dynastic Order
- Established: 4 November 1801; 1801 - 1910 (National Order); 1910 - present (House Order)
- Royal house: House of Braganza
- Religious affiliation: Catholic
- Motto: Pauperum Solatio
- Awarded for: Services in support of the Portuguese Crown, social charity and solidarity
- Status: Currently constituted
- Sovereign: Duarte Pio, Duke of Braganza
- Grand Mistress: Isabel, Duchess of Braganza
- Grades: Dame Grand Cross; Dame 1st Class; Dame 2nd Class

Precedence
- Next (higher): Order of the Immaculate Conception of Vila Viçosa
- Next (lower): Order of Merit of the Portuguese Royal House
- Equivalent: Order of Saint Michael of the Wing
- The Ribbon of the order

The Order of Queen Saint Isabel (Portuguese: Ordem da Rainha Santa Isabel) is a Catholic dynastic order of which the grand mistress is the duchess of Braganza.

== History ==
King John VI of Portugal created the order on 4 November 1801 in honour of Queen Isabel (died in 1236). He invested his wife, Queen Carlota Joaquina, as grand mistress of the order.

On 5 October 1910, the monarchy was replaced by a republic. The order, which was considered dynastic, continued to be bestowed by King Manuel II, who in exile also awarded it to his wife. After his death, the Queen and Queen Mother both continued to use the order's insignia of grand mistress.

In 1986, Duarte Pio, Duke of Braganza re-established the Order of Saint Isabel as an honorific dynastic order of the Portuguese royal family, and claimed its Sovereign Grand Mastership. The Duchess of Braganza is the current grand mistress and, besides honouring Portuguese noblewomen on the Saint's feast day, celebrated each year on 4 July at the Monastery of Santa Clara-a-Nova in Coimbra, the Royal House has, since 2000, bestowed it on various queens, princesses and women dedicated to the support of Portuguese charities.

== Insignia ==
The order's sash is pale pink and has a white stripe in the middle. On the accompanying crowned medallion is a picture of the Queen Saint giving money to a poor man. This picture is surrounded by a frame with roses (an allusion to the Queen's miracle). The insignia's motto is Pauperum Solatio ("Consolation of the Poor").

== Current Dames of Saint-Isabel ==
The annual ceremonial induction of Noble ladies of Saint Isabel takes place in the Convent of Santa Clara in Coimbra, on 4 July.

Dame Grand Mistress

- HRH The Duchess of Braganza (13 May 1995)

Dames (among others)

- HM The Custodian of the Crown of Romania (27 October 2012)
- HRH Maria Teresa, Grand Duchess of Luxemburg (27 October 2012)
- HRH Princess Margaretha, Princess Nikolaus of Liechtenstein (27 October 2012)
- HI&RH The Princess Imperial of Brazil (27 October 2012)
- HI&RH The Princess of Ligne (27 October 2012)
- HRH The Duchess of Castro (16 July 2014)
- HSH Princess Marie Therese of Hohenberg (16 July 2014)
- HH The Duchess of Coimbra (4 July 2018)
- HRH The Countess of Paris
- HRH Princess Marie, Princess Gundukar of Liechtenstein
- HRH Princess Míriam, Princess Ghazi of Jordan

== See also ==
- Order of Saint Michael of the Wing
- Order of the Immaculate Conception of Vila Viçosa

== Bibliography & Image ==
- Secretariado de Estado da Cultura. Tesouros Reais. Lisbon: Textype - Artes Gráficas, Ld.ª, 1992. ISBN 972-9496-12-9
- Evaristo, Carlos. Gli Ordini Portoghesi Della Casa Di Braganza: Evoluzione Storica Ed Attualita pp 227–240
