= Palace of the Dukes of Bragança (Lisbon) =

Former city palace of the dukes of Braganza in Lisbon, Portugal

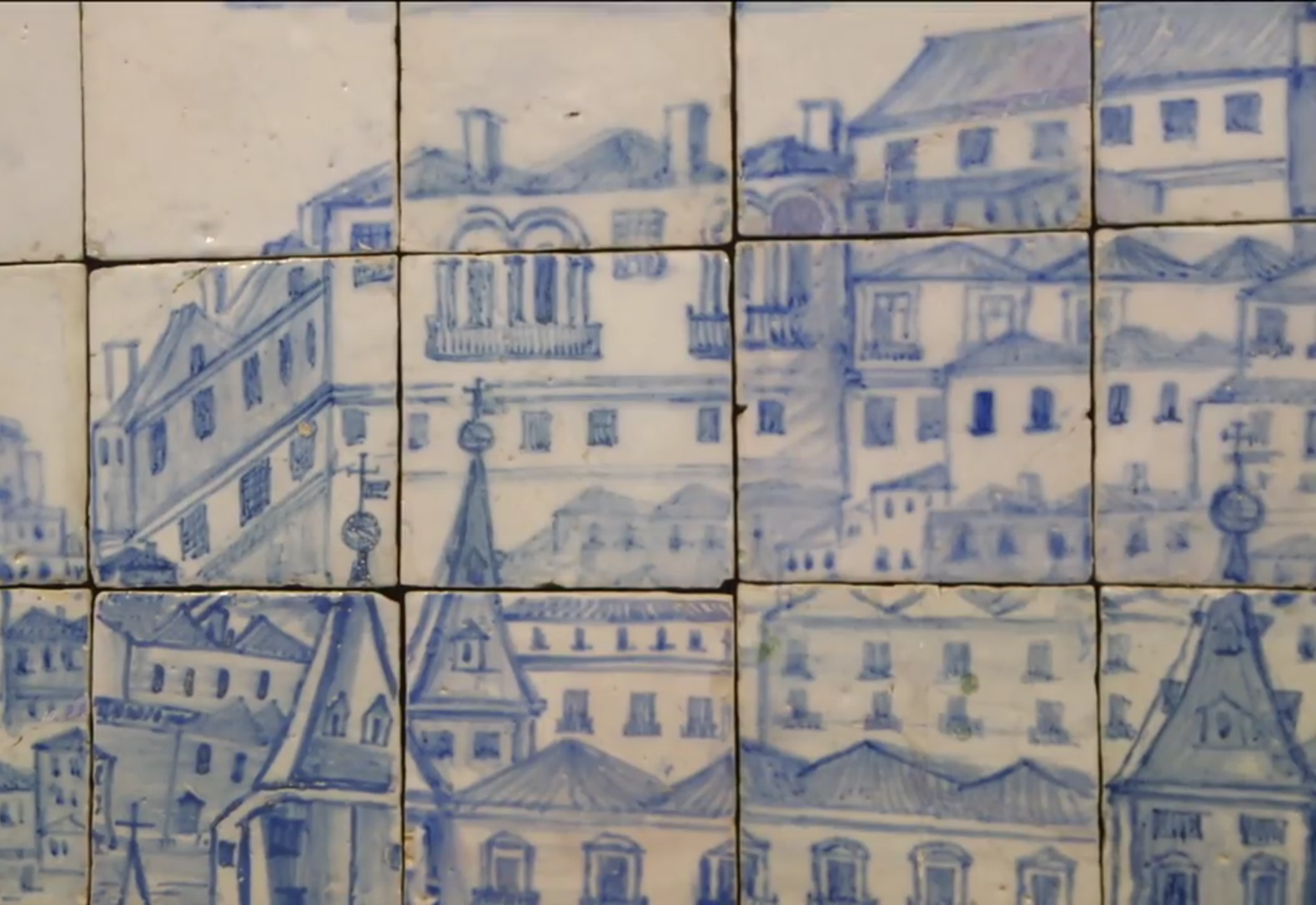
Tiles depicting the Palace of the Dukes of Bragança

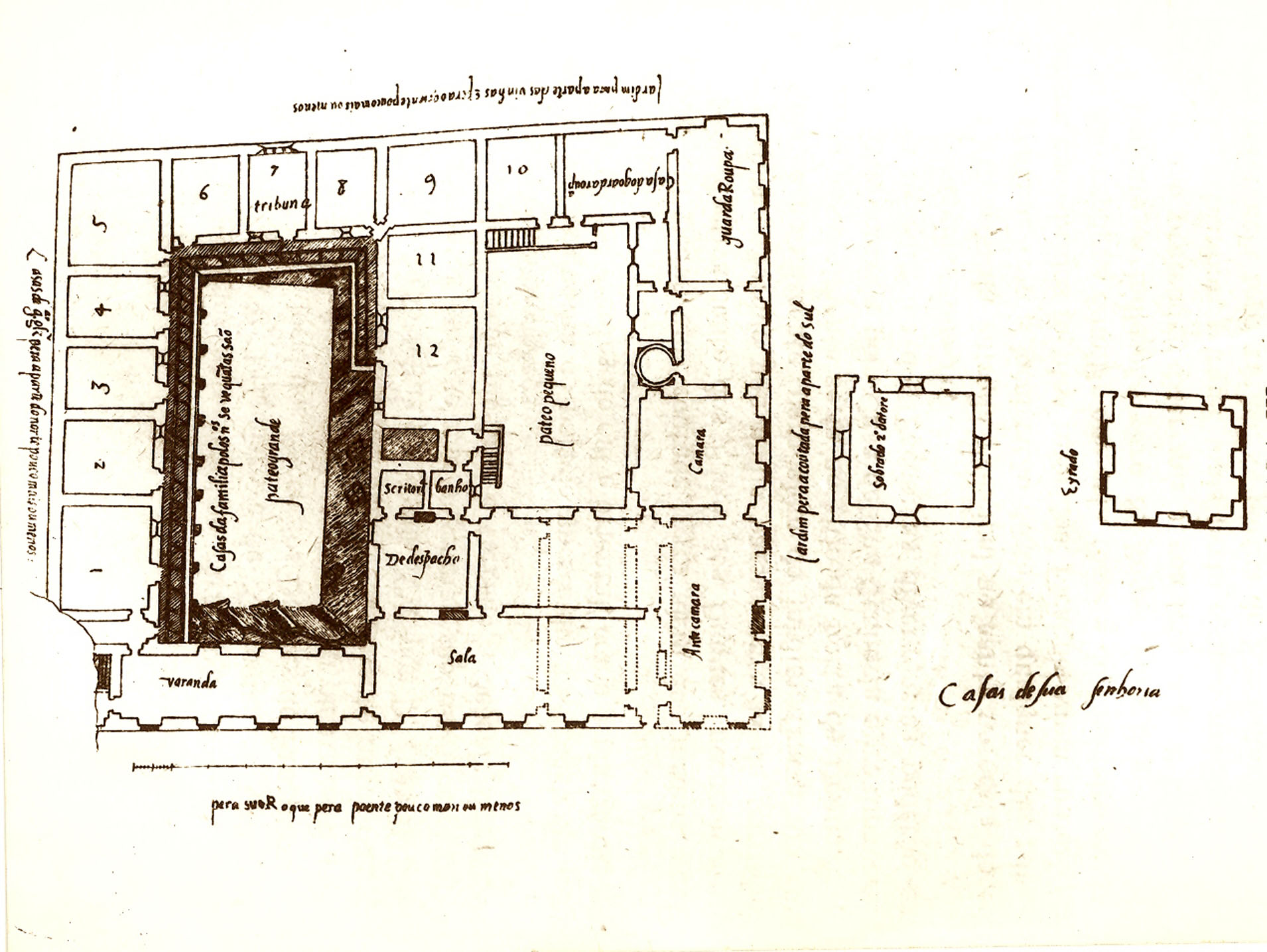
Map of the palace in the 16th century

The Palace of the Dukes of Bragança (Portuguese: Paço dos Duques de Bragança) was a former gothic palace and the residence of the Dukes of Braganza in the city of Lisbon, Portugal.

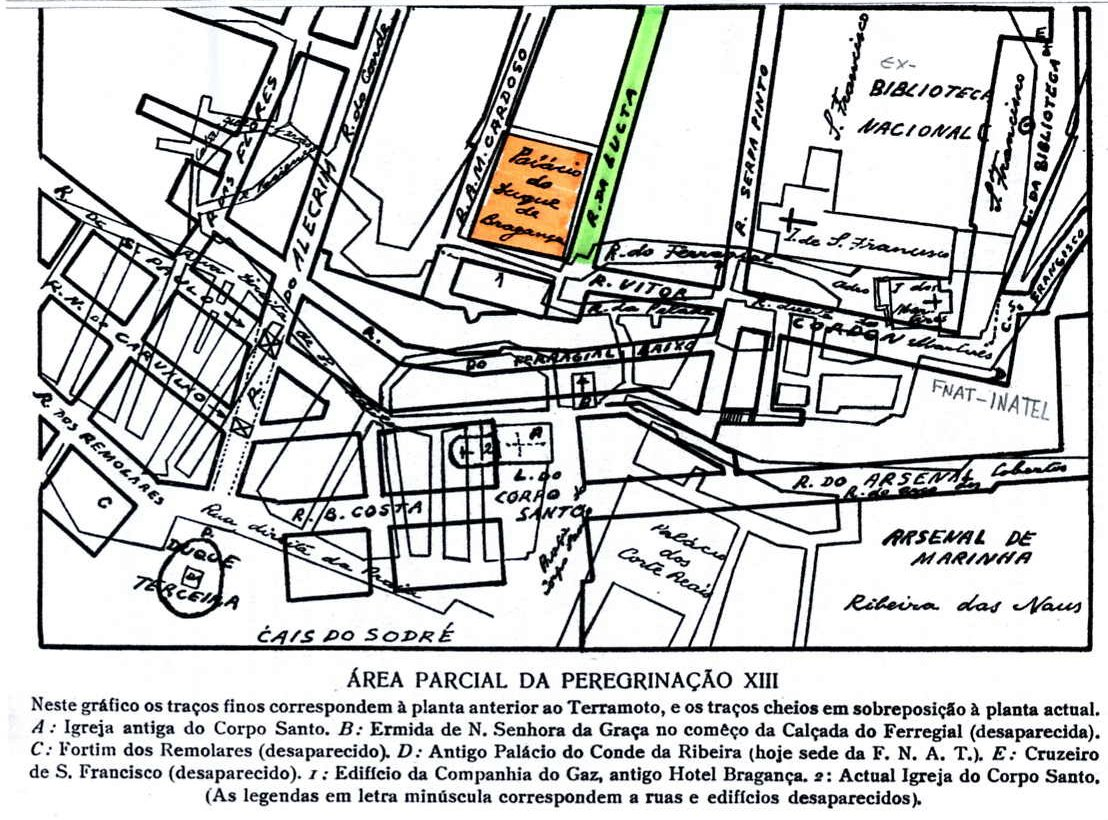
Location of the palace within Lisbon

The palace was constructed by duke Afonso I (1377–1461) in the 15th century. In the first half of the 18th century, the palace was the location of the Royal Academy of Portuguese History. During the 1755 Lisbon earthquake, it was heavily damaged and subsequently demolished.

Today, only the name of the street remembers of the location of the palace: Rua Duques de Bragança.

== Literature ==
- Silva, Augusto Vieira da (1969). "Os Paços dos Duques de Bragança em Lisboa". Dispersos Volume III (in Portuguese). Lisbon: CML. pp. 105–160.
- de Fátima Reis, Maria (January 2019). "O Paço dos Duques de Bragança em Lisboa, Sede da Academia Real da História Portugiesa: Mecenato e Poder Régio". Libros de la Corte Casas y Sitios en las Monarquias de Espana Y Portugal (in Portuguese): 243–257.
