= Order of the Immaculate Conception of Vila Viçosa =

Dynastic order of Portugal

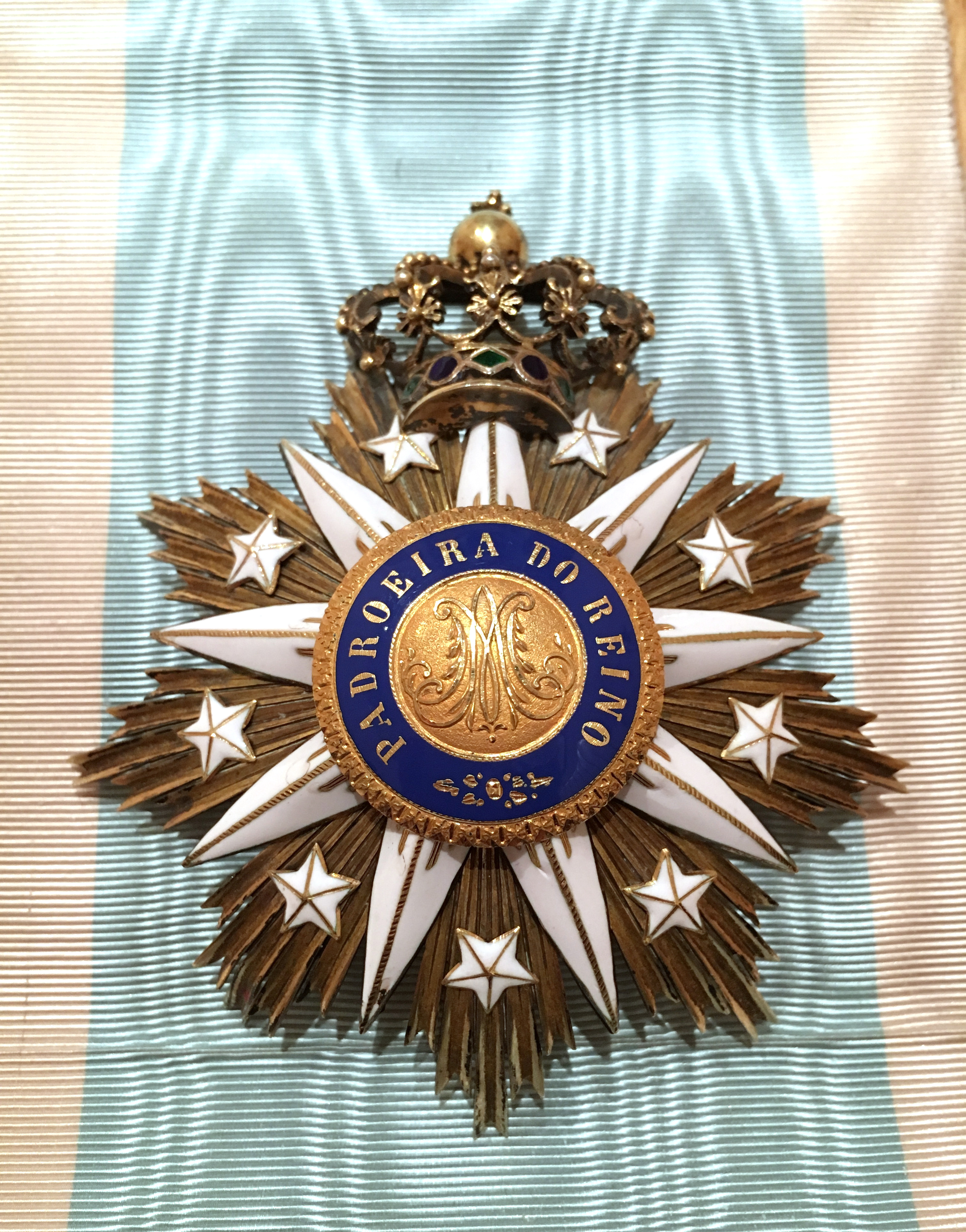
- Grand Cross star and sash

Awarded by The Duke of Braganza
- Type: Dynastic order
- Established: 6 February 1818
- Country: Portugal
- Royal house: Braganza
- Religious affiliation: Roman Catholic
- Ribbon: Light blue with silver stripes
- Sovereign and Grand Master: Duarte Pio, Duke of Braganza

Precedence
- Next (higher): None
- Next (lower): Order of Saint Michael of the Wing; Order of Saint Isabel
- Ribbon Bar

The Order of the Immaculate Conception of Vila Viçosa (also known as The Royal Military Order of Our Lady of the Conception of Vila Viçosa; Portuguese: Real Ordem Militar de Nossa Senhora da Conceição de Vila Viçosa) is a dynastic order of knighthood of the House of Braganza, the former Portuguese Royal Family. The current Grand Master of the Order is Duarte Pio, Duke of Braganza, the Head of the House of Braganza.

== History ==
The order was created by King John VI of Portugal in Rio de Janeiro on 6 February 1818, the date of his acclamation, in recognition for the efficient protection of the Kingdom's Spiritual Sovereign (Portugal is known as the Land of Santa Maria since its foundation). The Blessed Virgin Mother under the invocation of the Immaculate Conception (venerated in the Ducal Chapel of the Palace of Vila Viçosa) had earlier been acclaimed "Queen" and Patroness of the kingdom by King John IV on March 25, 1646 following a referendum of the Empire that lasted 6 years and asked subjects: 1. If they believed the Blessed Virgin Mary to have been conceived without sin, and 2. If they believed that the Blessed Virgin Mary was the physical reigning Queen of Portugal and not just symbolically the Patroness. The people answered affirmatively and since the Coronation that took place at Vila Viçosa, the Kings of Portugal never again wore a crown.

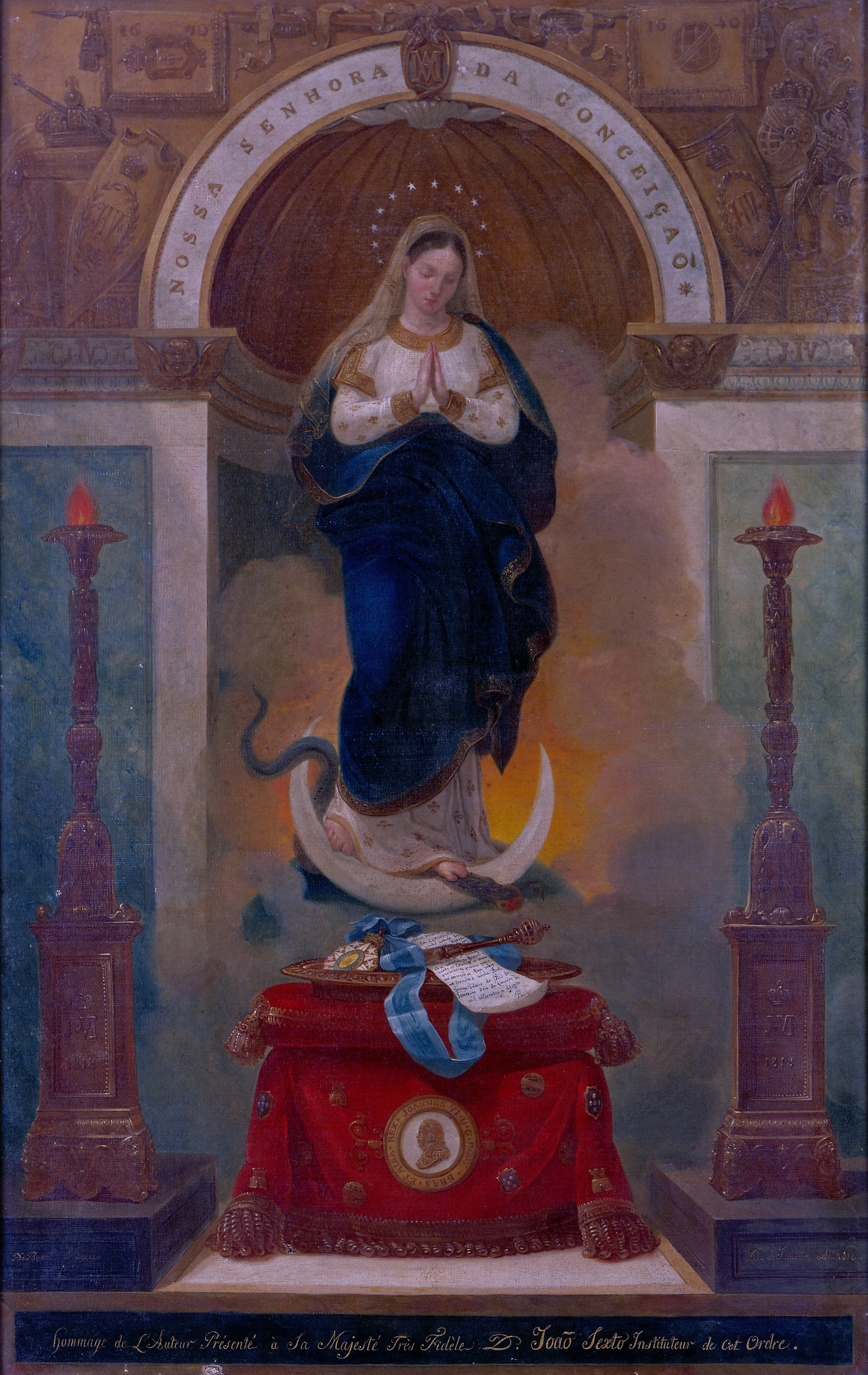
Allegory of the Order of the Immaculate Conception, 1818, by Jean-Baptiste Debret, who also designed the insignias of the new order of knighthood

This order distinguished those who proved their loyalty to the Portuguese Royal House in the war against the Bonapartist occupying forces. Later, in 1818, a royal decree stated that the Order would be given as a military award in four (4) classes of Grand Cross, Commander, Knight, and Servant. Knighthood was given to those who were servants to the king and devoted Catholics to the pope and the Holy Mother. The Order was originally limited to twelve Grand Crosses, forty Commanders and one hundred Knights, with the provision for the award of supernumerary Grand Crosses. Grand Crosses were usually given to higher nobles who had positions in the Royal Household. Lower grades (Commander and below) were granted to lesser nobles who had provided personal service to the King.

Unlike the earlier Religious-Military Orders, the Order of Christ, the Order of St. Benedict of Aviz, and the Order of St. James of the Sword, Vila Viçosa was more aligned to the Order of the Tower and Sword which had been re-established by King John VI. Late into the 19th century, the constitutional sovereigns were inclined to treat the Order of Vila Viçosa as the paramount award given by the sovereign for services rendered to the Royal House.

In 1910, a revolution installed a Republican government that took over all State Orders except the Order of the Immaculate Conception of Vila Viçosa; as a result, King Manuel II of Portugal in exile and, after his death, the Dukes of Braganza continued to use the order's insignia and to bestow it as they considered the Order to belong to their dynasty rather than the state. Just after the Second World War, it was bestowed on Prime Minister António de Oliveira Salazar by Queen Amelia when she visited Portugal for the last time.

In December 1983, Duarte Pio, Duke of Braganza, re-activated the Order of the Immaculate Conception of Vila Viçosa, and maintains it as an honorific order of the Portuguese Royal Family. He has since then distinguished many Portuguese personalities (including giving the Order's Medal of Merit to among them football star Cristiano Ronaldo).

== Organisation ==
Ducal Palace of Vila Viçosa, the seat of the Dukes of Braganza

The order is primarily bestowed upon Portuguese nobles, and only occasionally out of protocol on Heads of State and Royal Houses, but has also been bestowed (before 2005) on foreign and Portuguese recipients who received it solely as an honorary award for services rendered to the expansion of the Cult of the Blessed Virgin Mary, the Message of Our Lady of Fátima, or the Roman Catholic Church, but who are not listed as active members of the Portuguese order and therefore not invited to attend functions or events organised by the order.

The order is unofficially acknowledged by the Portuguese government. It may be worn by Portuguese citizens, but not on Portuguese military uniforms.

Honorary members are not expected to contribute with yearly dues or contributions, although they may wear the decorations at public events if they solicit and obtain permission beforehand to do so from the Secretariat of the Royal House.

== Grades ==
The Order is divided in four grades:

- Grand-Cross (GCNSC)
- Commander (ComNSC)
- Knight/ Dame (CvNSC / DmNSC)
- Serving Brother or Sister (SNSC)

== Insignia ==
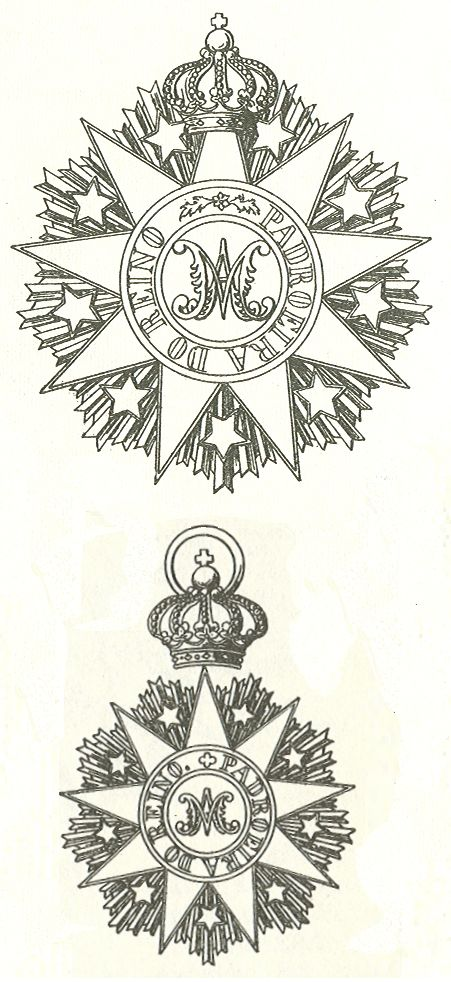
Breast Star of the Grand Cross and sash insignia of the Order of the Immaculate Conception of Vila Viçosa

The order's insignia was designed by the French painter Jean-Baptiste Debret (1768–1848), who was in charge of creating in Rio de Janeiro an arts and crafts lyceum (Escola Real de Artes e Ofícios) under the auspices of King João VI and the Marquis of Marialva. The order's sash is light blue and white. The medallion is starshaped and crowned, and in it center has a monogram with the letters "AM". Surrounding the monogram there is an inscription saying "Padroeira do Reino" ("Patroness of the Kingdom").

== Notable recipients ==
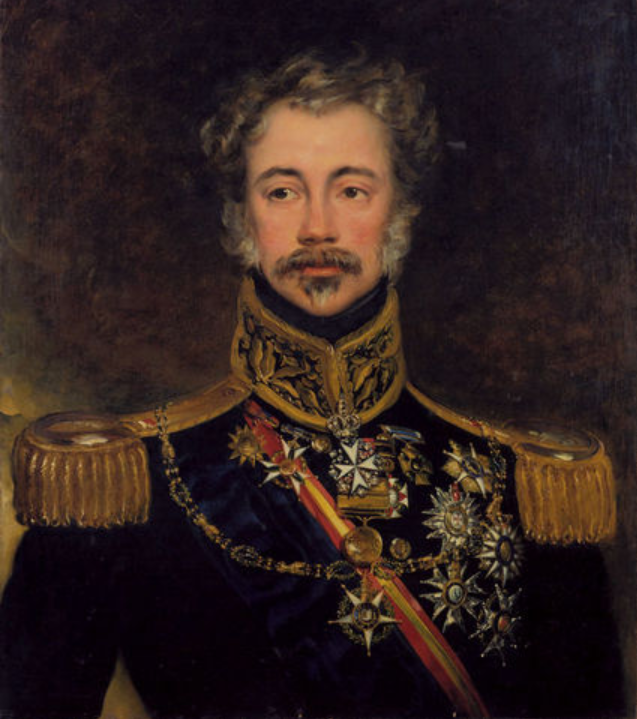
Duke of Saldanha wearing the Grand Cross of the order of Vila Viçosa among other orders of knighthood.

- (Spain) Infante Juan, Count of Barcelona (father to King Juan Carlos I)
- Juan Carlos I of Spain (King of Spain)
- (Belgium) Mgr Gaetano Bisleti (Cardinal)
- (Belgium) Joseph Geefs (Sculptor)
- (Belgium) Aymard d'Ursel (Papal Chamberlain)
- Charles Rogier (8th Prime Minister of Belgium)
- Count Paul de Smet de Naeyer (16th Prime Minister of Belgium)
- (Belgium) Joseph, Prince de Caraman-Chimay (Belgian noble)
- (Kingdom of Italy) Vittorio Emanuele, Prince of Naples; (Head of the Royal House of Italy)
- (Kingdom of the Two Sicilies) Prince Carlo, Duke of Castro (Head of the Royal House of the Two Sicilies)
- (Kingdom of the Two Sicilies) Infante Carlos, Duke of Calabria (Head of the Royal House of the Two Sicilies)
- (Austria-Hungary) Otto von Habsburg (Crown Prince of Austria and Hungary)
- (Kingdom of Yugoslavia) Alexander, Crown Prince of Yugoslavia (Head of the Royal House of Serbia)
- (Kingdom of Portugal) Dom Miguel, Duke of Viseu (Infante of Portugal)
- (Kingdom of Portugal) Infante Henrique, Duke of Coimbra (Infante of Portugal)
- (Kingdom of Portugal) Dom Afonso, Prince of Beira (Infante of Portugal)
- (Kingdom of Portugal) João Carlos Saldanha de Oliveira Daun, 1st Duke of Saldanha (Portuguese military and noble)
- (Empire of Brazil) Conselheiro Rodrigo Augusto da Silva (Brazilian senator)
- (Empire of Brazil) José Paranhos, Viscount of Rio Branco (Prime Minister of Brazil)
- (Empire of Brazil) Luís Alves de Lima e Silva, Duke of Caxias (Brazilian military and noble)
- (Empire of Brazil) Prince Luiz of Orléans-Braganza (Head of the Imperial House of Brazil)
- (Empire of Japan) Itō Hirobumi (1st Prime Minister of Japan)
- (Empire of Japan) Ōkuma Shigenobu (8th Prime Minister of Japan)
- (Germany) Gustav von Padberg Oberhofmarschall of Coburg and Gotha, awarded in 1884.
- (South African Republic) Paul Kruger (President of the Republic of Transvaal, awarded in 1892, after the breakdown of Boer-Portuguese relationships in 1899 he returned the order and was struck off the roll)
- (Cape Verde) Jorge Carlos Fonseca (President of Cabo Verde, decorated in November 2012)
- (Portugal) Cristiano Ronaldo (professional footballer, decorated with the Medal of Merit on 30 August 2006)
- (Portugal) José António Marques, founder of the Portuguese Red Cross
- George Edward Glass, United States ambassador to Portugal

== See also ==
- Order of Saint Michael of the Wing
- Order of Saint Isabel
