= Order of Saint Michael of the Wing =

Dynastic order of Portugal

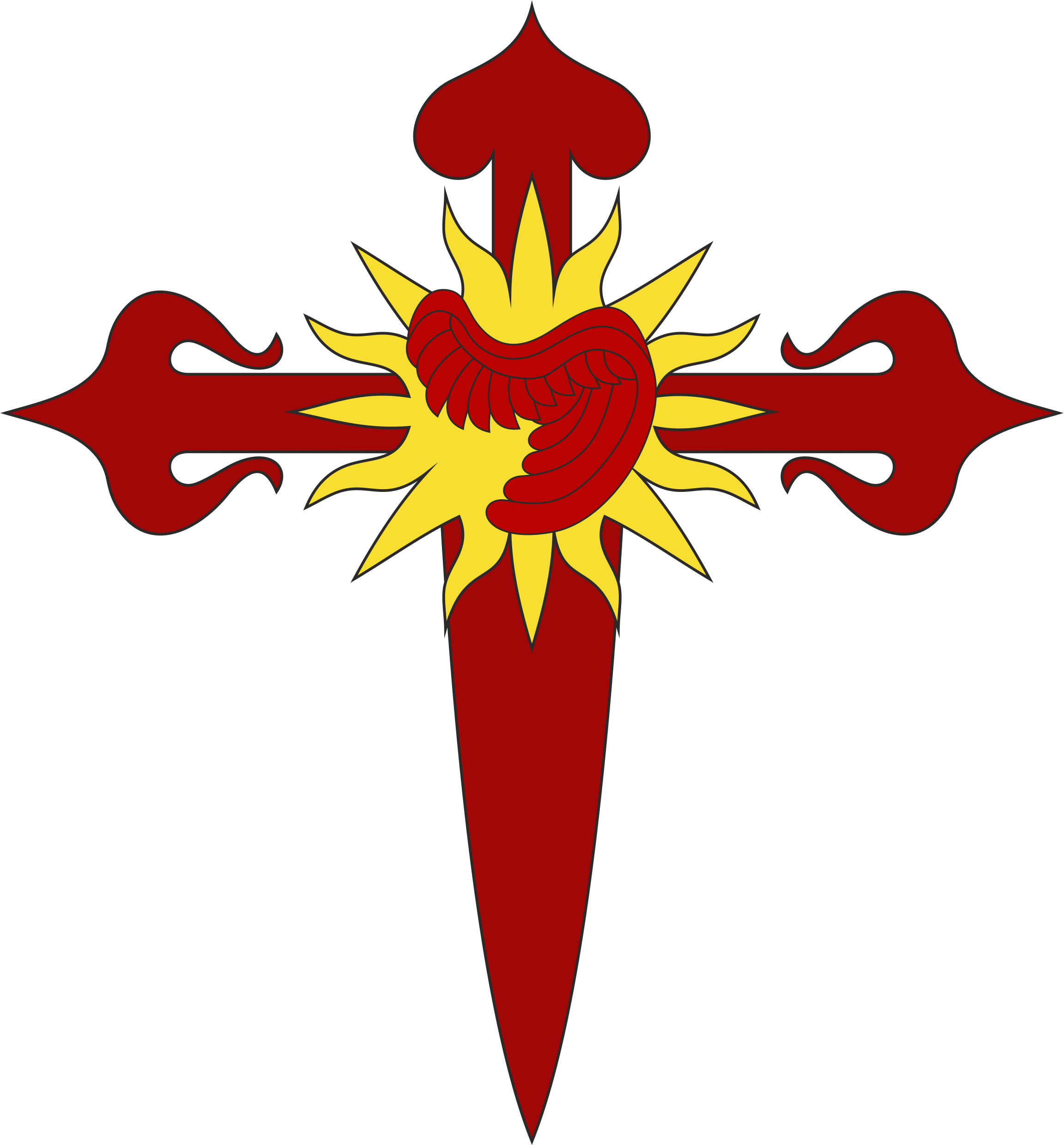
- Emblem of the order.
- Type: Dynastic order/ "Institution of chivalric character"
- Established: 1171; Revived 1828/1848; Revived 1981/1986/2001
- Country: former Royal House of Portugal
- Royal house: House of Braganza
- Religious affiliation: Roman Catholic
- Ribbon: Red
- Motto: Quis ut Deus
- Founder: King Afonso I of Portugal
- Patron Saint: Nuno de Santa Maria Alvares Pereira
- Sovereign and Grand Master: Duarte Pio, Duke of Braganza

Precedence
- Next (higher): Order of the Immaculate Conception of Vila Viçosa
- Next (lower): Order of Merit of the Portuguese Royal House
- Equivalent: Order of Saint Isabel
- Ribbon of the order

The Royal Equestrian and Military Order of Saint Michael of the Wing (Latin: Ordo Equitum Sancti Michaelis sive de Ala, Portuguese: Real Ordem Equestre e Militar de São Miguel da Ala) is a Portuguese Roman Catholic dynastic order that is believed to have been founded in 1147 in the Alcobaça Monastery in Alcobaça, Portugal, by King Afonso I of Portugal, in commemoration of the Conquest of Santarém from the Moors in 1147. The name was chosen in honour of the military Saint Archangel Michael, who assisted in the victory in the shape of a wing in the sky.

Its medieval history including claims of recognition in 1171 by Pope Alexander III, relies heavily on documentation from the 16th to the 18th century. It is classified by the privately operated and funded International Commission on Orders of Chivalry as an "Institution of chivalric character" that was founded as a chivalric order subsequently "revived by the dynastic successor of the founding authority" (2004). The knights were under the jurisdiction of the Abbot of the Cistercian Alcobaça Monastery, and recited the same prayers as its lay brothers along with other military orders during the Reconquista.

It is considered to have been revived twice. First in 1828 or 1848 in support of the Miguelist movement by King Miguel I of Portugal, and secondly in its current form in 1981 by later Portuguese monarchists, recognised in 1986 by the Royal House of Braganza.

Duarte Pio, Duke of Braganza, pretender to the Portuguese throne as head of its former royal house, is grand master of the order and Judge of the associated Royal Brotherhood, statuted as Roman Catholic association of the faithful in 2001, with proof of previous statutes of 1630, 1848 and 1981. Ever since, the order has been conferred on individuals of merit through the brotherhood chosen exclusively by the House of Braganza. The Order plays an important role in recognising the achievements of the Portuguese diaspora and the maintenance of Portuguese language, culture, and identity in the former Portuguese colonies, particularly Macau.

== Name ==
The name derives from the Wing of Saint Michael the Archangel, who, it was believed, assisted at the victory of the Taking of Santarém from the Moors on 8 May 1147.

== History ==
Depending on the source consulted, the order existed briefly in the 12th century, fell into disuse in 1732, subsequently revived in 1848, survived until 1910, subsequently revived in 1986. Unlike many other Portuguese orders, it has not been nationalized as a decoration of the state by the post-1910 Portuguese Republic.

=== Middle Ages ===
The order was founded by King Afonso I to honour a group of knights of the Order of Saint James of the Sword from the Kingdom of León who assisted him in retaking Santarém from the Moors on the Feast of Saint Michael, May 8, 1147. Originally, the order was formed from members of the Military Order of Saint James. This is why it maintains on its coat of arms the red sword of this Order conjoined with two fleurs de lis representing the Cistercian Rule its members observed at the Royal Abbey of Alcobaça where the Order, along with 6 other Military Orders was headquartered until the re-establishment of all Orders as unarmed and non-military Orders of "Honorific Knighthood" in 1834. The Order's first statutes were approved by Pope Alexander III in 1171.

The order fell into disuse by 1732 at the latest. In 1907, George Cyprian Alston, writing in the Catholic Encyclopedia stated that the order died in the Middle Ages, soon after the death of its founder, Alphonse, while others, such as John C.L. Gieseler (also known by the German form of his name Johann K.L. Gieseler), argued that it only ever existed on paper. It was not, in any case, included among the royal orders that were nationalized by the Portuguese Republic after the Revolution of 1910.

=== Miguelism ===
The Order was restored by King Miguel I in 1828 during his brief rule before losing the Liberal Wars to his brother King Pedro IV. Later, in 1848, the order received new statutes under permission of Pope Gregory XVI, whilst King Miguel was living in exile in the Rome. These Statutes restructured it as a secret military order to combat Freemasonry and restore the Absolutist Monarchy in Portugal. Some Portuguese scholars, such as Marcus de Noronha da Costa, Gomes Abrunhosa Marques de Almeida, and Manuel Ângelo, reject the description of the 1848 institution as a revived order and regard it as a secret society aiming to restore Miguel's branch of the Braganza family to power in Portugal. The headquarters of the revived order were located in Porto. After his death in 1866, a group of knights are said to have remained until 1868. Its activity was however officially suspended after the Pope prohibited all secret organisations, Roman Catholic or otherwise.

There are disputed claims that Miguel's revived order was awarded by his descendants until in 1986, Duarte Pio, Duke of Braganza and pretender to the Portuguese throne, informed the Holy See and the Portuguese Republic that he still considered himself to be the Grand Master of the Order, and that although he did not have the power to validly alter the statutes a king had previously approved, he nonetheless still conferred it as an award. Duarte Pio's claims have been disputed in Portuguese courts which, in at least one case, held that Duarte Pio's order is an entirely new private entity, not a dynastic award of the House of Braganza. The Civil Courts finally ruled decisively in favour of the valid and founded claims of Dom Duarte de Bragança, and on December 7, Duarte Pio of Braganza won the case and retained the legal rights.

=== Modern revival ===
In 2001, the Duke promulgated new statutes submitted to various bishops to govern a royal Catholic brotherhood to complement the order as an active social group for Roman Catholic members, and since that time, the order has been conferred on individuals through the brotherhood chosen exclusively by the House of Braganza. The signing of the new statutes of the order were made with proof of previous statutes of the years 1630, 1848 and 1981 by Prince Duarte Pio.

=== Dispute 2014-2015 ===
In 2014, the Court of Lisbon forbade Duarte Pio of Braganza to use the insignia of the Order of Saint Michael of the Wing and demanded that he pay compensation of €300,000 to the legal owners of the rights, Nuno da Câmara Pereira, who allegedly registered the name "Order of Saint Michael of the Wing" (Portuguese: "Ordem de São Miguel da Ala") in 1981, whereas Duarte Pio is said to have registered it in 2004. The condemnation was repeated on October 5, 2015. However, on November 3, 2015, the rights of Nuno Pereira da Camera to the symbols was lost, and on December 7, 2015, Duarte Pio of Braganza won the case and regained the legal rights.

== Organisation ==
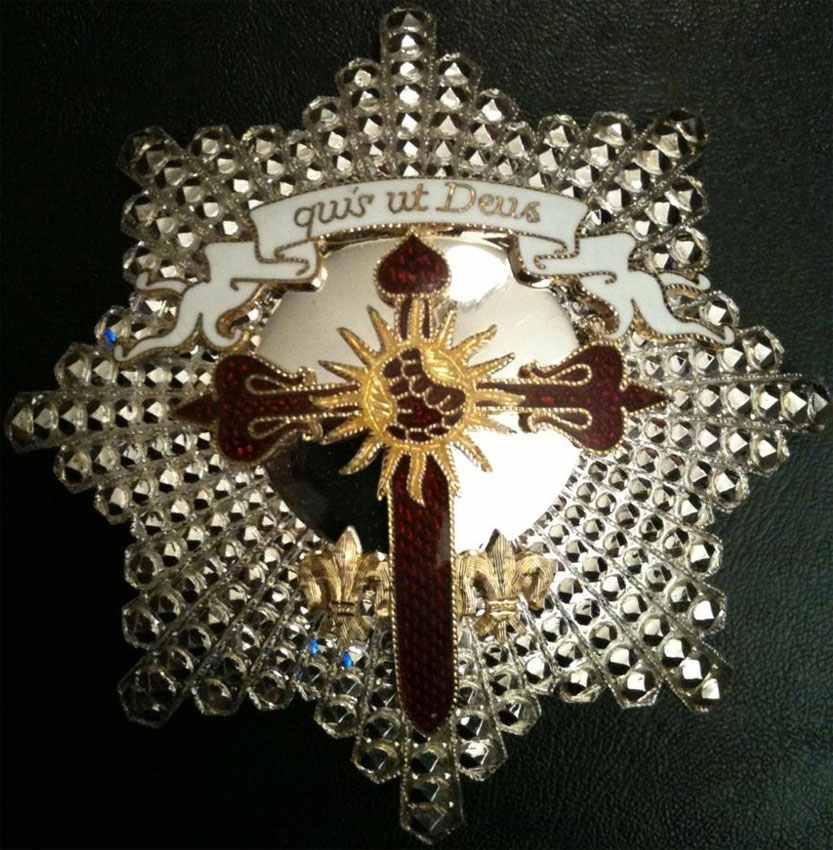
Star of a Knight Commander of the Order of Saint Michael of the Wing.

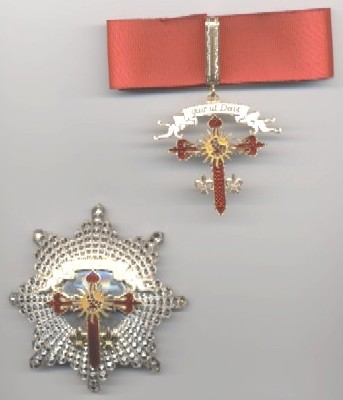
Insignia of the order.

Membership in the order may be bestowed upon individuals of any citizenship, religion, or gender for recognised outstanding contributions to Portuguese royal charities or for the spread of devotion to Saint Michael, traditionally venerated as Angel of Portugal and Angel of Peace.

Members of the order who are Roman Catholics are designated as "Professed Brothers", admitted through the Royal Brotherhood of Saint Michael of the Wing (SMA), a Roman Catholic Association of the faithful of which the Duke of Braganza is "Judge", created as an active Roman Catholic social compliment to the Order in 2001.

Postulants who are not awarded the order for outstanding services may join the Royal Brotherhood if they are Roman Catholics in good standing (practicing and not divorced or interdicted) and usually after three years as a Professed Brother, may be advanced into the order.

=== Ranks ===
The grade advancements include:

- Grand Collar (with insignia surmounted by crown is reserved exclusively for use by the Grand Master and without crown is used by the members of the grand council, i.e. grand chancellor and chancellor)
- Grand Cross with Collar of the Royal Brotherhood (worn by the Grand Master, Royal Patrons, Bishops, vice-chancellors, Grand Chaplains and Judges and also by Delegates of the Royal Brotherhood when serving in representative charge. Otherwise it can be bestowed in special cases to royalty and other high ranking or VIP members of the Order such as heads of state. It can also be bestowed on anyone the Grand Master or Bishops decide to award for extraordinary services rendered. Note that this Collar is the Collar of the Royal Brotherhood of the Order of Saint Michael of the Wing instituted in 2021 for the 850th anniversary of the Order and is not the same as the Grand Collar of the Order)
- Grand Cross (cross in a sash over the right shoulder and a gold plaque)
- Grand Officer (cross around the neck and gold breast star)
- Commander (cross around the neck and silver breast star)
- Knight (cross around the neck of Commander size)

== Notable recipients ==
- Gary R. Herbert, Governor of Utah (Grand Cross)
- David Isserman, American ecommerce entrepreneur and conservationist (Cavaleiro Honorário)

== See also ==
- Order of the Immaculate Conception of Vila Viçosa
- Order of Saint Isabel
