= Maria Francisca, Duchess of Coimbra =

Portuguese royal (born 1997)

Maria Francisca of Braganza
- Infanta of Portugal, Duchess of Coimbra
- Born: Maria Francisca Isabel Micaela Gabriela Rafaela; 3 March 1997 (age 29); Lisbon, Portugal
- Spouse: Duarte Maria de Sousa Araújo Martins (m. 2023)
- House: Braganza
- Father: Duarte Pio, Duke of Braganza
- Mother: Isabel de Herédia

Maria Francisca of Braganza (born 3 March 1997), is the second child and only daughter of Duarte Pio, Duke of Braganza, pretender to the defunct Portuguese throne, and Isabel de Herédia. She uses the titles Infanta of Portugal and Duchess of Coimbra.

== Biography ==
Maria Francisca is the daughter of Duarte Pio and Isabel de Herédia, the couple's second child.

She was baptised in Vila Viçosa by the Archbishop of Évora, Maurílio de Gouveia, on 31 May 1997, and her godparents were Princess Marie of Liechtenstein, her father's maternal cousin, and Henrique Nuno de Bragança, Duke of Coimbra, her father's brother.

She graduated in Social and Cultural Communications from the Catholic University of Portugal. In 2017, she debuted to society at the Bal des débutantes in Paris.

She lives in London, together with her husband.

== Public role ==
She presided over the award ceremony for the Marquês de Rio Maior Agriculture 2023 prize, set up by the Royal Ribatejo Association, on 24 November. In her speech, Maria Francisca congratulated the farmers and their capacity for resilience and innovation.

The Infanta Dona Maria Francisca Prize (Prémio Infanta Dona Maria Francisca), whose patron is Maria Francisca, is an annual prize aimed at highlighting works in painting and sculpture by master's degree students.

The result of a partnership between Soares dos Reis National Museum, Associação Real Social Cultura Desporto, School of Fine Arts of University of Porto and Serralves Museum of Contemporary Art, the prize is awarded annually to two winners, one for painting and one for sculpture.

Maria Francisca was in charge of organising the yearly Jantar dos Conjurados in 2023. The event took place on 30 November at the National Museum of Natural History and supported Banco do Bebé. The event, which took place a month after Maria Francisca's wedding to Duarte Martins, featured a charity auction of objects, including Duarte Pio's panama hat, which he had worn at his daughter's wedding.

== Marriage ==
On 7 October 2023, Maria Francisca married Duarte de Sousa Araújo Martins, a Lisbon-based lawyer. The proposal took place in Timor-Leste and the engagement was announced by Duarte Pio de Bragança on 15 December 2022.

The wedding took place in the Basilica of Mafra, presided over by Manuel Clemente, Cardinal-Patriarch Emeritus of Lisbon, in the presence of Cardinal Américo Aguiar and several Portuguese bishops. The wedding and the reception that followed were broadcast live on TVI. Maria Francisca wore, among other jewellery, Queen Amélia's tiara, inherited by her father Duarte Pio de Bragança, and which had been worn by her mother, Isabel de Herédia, at their wedding. The Basilica and the Palace of Mafra were closed to the public for the previous eight days due to the wedding preparations.

At the end of the wedding, the Apostolic blessing bestowed upon the bride and groom by Pope Francis was read out. Maria Francisca then went to offer the bridal bouquet to the image of Our Lady of Solitude in the main altar of the Basilica, which had recently received the canonical coronation, to the sound of Cante Alentejano.

The wedding was attended by 1,200 guests. Among the guests were Marcelo Rebelo de Sousa, President of Portugal, and various representatives of the Royal Families of Europe and Brazil. Among the reigning families were members of the Royal House of Belgium, the Grand Ducal House of Luxembourg and the Princely House of Liechtenstein, who are descendants of King Miguel I. Also present was Fra' John Dunlap, 81st Prince and Grand Master of the Sovereign Military Order of Malta. Among the non-reigning Imperial or Royal Families were the Imperial House of Brazil, the Royal House of France, the Imperial House of Russia, the Imperial House of Austria and the Royal House of Bulgaria.

Also in attendance were several representatives from Portuguese politics, such as former Prime Ministers Durão Barroso, Pedro Santana Lopes and Pedro Passos Coelho, Miguel Albuquerque, President of Madeira, Carlos Moedas, Mayor of Lisbon, Paulo Portas, former Deputy Prime Minister, among others.

After the wedding, which took place in the afternoon, a reception was held in the cloisters of the Palace of Mafra. Two wedding cakes were prepared, one for the guests inside the Palace and the other for the public in the yard in front of Mafra Palace. In the evening, dinner was held in Sintra, at the bride's parents' estate.

== Claimed titles ==
As well as being a claimant to the title of Infanta of Portugal, she is also a claimant to the title of Duchess of Coimbra. In 2018, the year she turned 21, she was honoured with the title of Duchess of Coimbra by her father, Duarte Pio, a title previously held by her late uncle, Henrique Nuno de Bragança, who died in 2017. Maria Francisca received this title at a ceremony held at the Church of Rainha Santa in Coimbra, which was attended by family and friends of the family. This would make Maria Francisca the 5th Duchess of Coimbra, if Portugal was a constitutional monarchy.

Maria Francisca, Duchess of Coimbra House of Braganza
Titles in pretence
Preceded by Henrique Nuno de Bragança; 4th Duke of Coimbra	5th Duchess of Coimbra; 2018 - present	Succeeded by -

== Honours ==
- Dame of Order of Saint Isabel

== See also ==
- Royal House of Braganza
- Dukes of Coimbra
- Infante of Portugal
