= Duarte Pio, Duke of Braganza =

Pretender to the throne of Portugal (born 1945)

Duarte Pio de Bragança
- Duke of Braganza
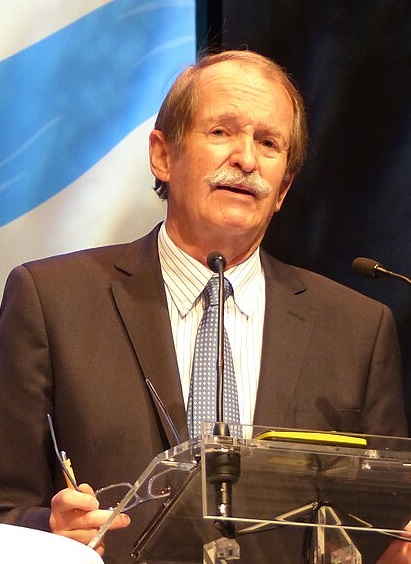
- Duarte Pio in 2017

Head of the Royal House of Portugal
- Reign: 24 December 1976 – present
- Predecessor: Duarte Nuno, Duke of Braganza
- Heir apparent: Afonso, Prince of Beira
- Born: 15 May 1945 (age 81); Bern, Switzerland
- Spouse: Isabel Inês de Castro Curvello de Herédia (m. 1995)
- Issue: Afonso, Prince of Beira; Maria Francisca, Duchess of Coimbra; Dinis, Duke of Porto
- House: Braganza
- Father: Duarte Nuno, Duke of Braganza
- Mother: Princess Maria Francisca of Orléans-Braganza
- Religion: Roman Catholicism
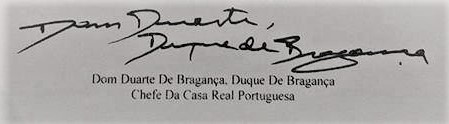
- Signature
- Military career
- Allegiance: Portugal
- Branch: Portuguese Air Force
- Service years: 1968–1971
- Conflicts: Portuguese Colonial War

Dom Duarte Pio, Duke of Braganza (Portuguese: Duarte Pio de Bragança, born 15 May 1945), commonly known simply as Dom Duarte, is the current Duke of Braganza and a claimant to the defunct Portuguese throne, as the head of the House of Braganza. The Miguelist Braganzas, to whom Duarte Pio belongs as a great-grandson of King Miguel I, is a cadet branch of the House of Braganza. With the extinction of male-line dynasts descended from Queen Maria II in 1932, King Miguel's descendants became the only male-line Braganzas remaining and the closest male-line heirs to the defunct Portuguese throne.

Duarte Pio is a figure within the European network of royal houses, often being invited to various foreign royal events. Despite his support for a monarchical government and widespread recognition as pretender to the throne, there are no major movements or parties that support restoration of the monarchy.

In 1995, the Duke married Isabel Inês de Castro Curvelo de Herédia, a Portuguese businesswoman and descendant of Portuguese nobility. Their marriage was the first marriage of a Portuguese royal to happen in Portuguese territory since the marriage of King Carlos I and Princess Amélie of Orléans, in 1886. The Duke and Duchess have three children, thus continuing the line of the Braganzas, as neither of the Duke's brothers has married or had children.

The Duke of Braganza holds Portuguese citizenship, by birth, and East Timorese citizenship due to high service to the country.

== Early life ==
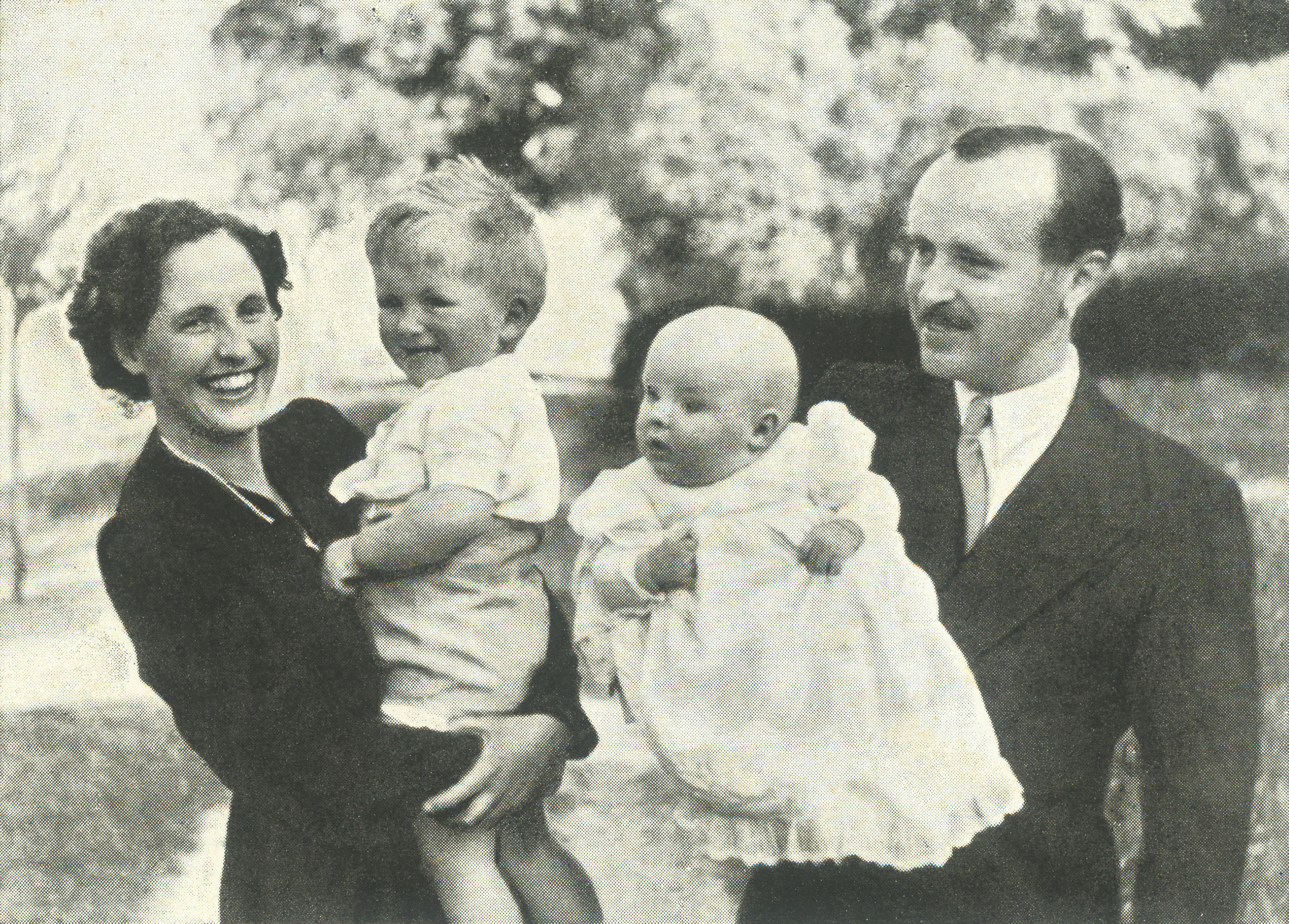
Duarte with his parents, Duarte Nuno, Duke of Braganza, and Princess Maria Francisca of Orléans-Braganza, and his brother Miguel, Duke of Viseu

Duarte Pio was born on 15 May 1945 in Bern, Switzerland, as the first of three sons of Duarte Nuno, Duke of Braganza, and Princess Maria Francisca of Orléans-Braganza. Duarte Pio uses a full name ending with Miguel Gabriel Rafael, a naming tradition of the House of Braganza that honors the three archangels in the Catholic Church. His name as registered at birth was simply Duarte Pio de Bragança. His father was the grandson of King Miguel I, while his mother was a great-granddaughter of King Pedro IV (Emperor Pedro I of Brazil), who was Miguel's elder brother. Through his father, he is a member of the Miguelist branch of the House of Braganza. Duarte Pio's godparents were Pope Pius XII and Queen Amélie of Portugal (the mother of King Manuel II, the last monarch of Portugal).

The Duke is regarded as a Portuguese national by descent, since his father was Portuguese (and so Duarte Pio's birth was legitimately included in the Portuguese Civil Registry). At the time of his birth, Duarte Pio and the rest of the Miguelist Braganzas were banned from entering Portugal, by the laws of exile of 19 December 1834.

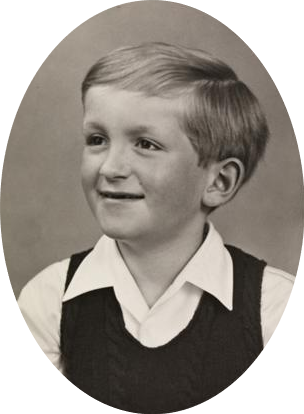
Duarte Pio as a child, while Prince of Beira

On 27 May 1950, the Portuguese National Assembly revoked both the laws of exile from 19 December 1834, which banned the Miguelist Braganzas, and the laws of exile from 15 October 1910, which banned the Legitimist Braganzas. In 1951, Dom Duarte visited Portugal for the first time, accompanied by his aunt, Infanta Filipa. In 1952, he moved to Portugal permanently with his parents and brothers.

From 1957 to 1959, Duarte was enrolled in the Colégio Nun'Álvares in Santo Tirso. In 1960, he entered the Colégio Militar in Lisbon. He attended the Instituto Superior de Agronomia (now part of the Technical University of Lisbon) and later the Graduate Institute of Development Studies of the University of Geneva.

From 1968 to 1971, Dom Duarte fulfilled his military service as a helicopter pilot in the Portuguese Air Force in Portuguese Angola at the time of the Portuguese Colonial War. In 1972, he participated with a multi-ethnic Angolan group in the organization of an independent list of candidates to the National Assembly. This resulted in his expulsion from Angola by order of the Prime Minister Marcelo Caetano.

== Succession ==
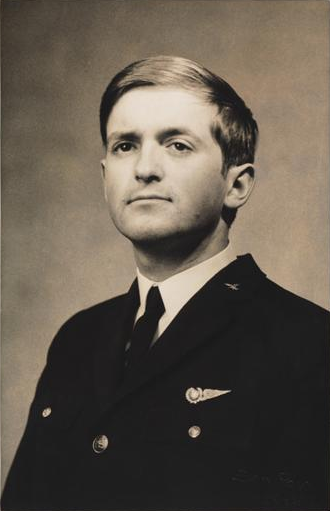
Duarte Pio in Portuguese Air Force uniform during the Colonial War

Duarte Pio claims the throne as the heir of King Manuel II according to the Constitutional Charter of 1826. Duarte Pio is widely considered the heir of the abolished Portuguese throne, but a small number of Portuguese monarchists do not recognise him as pretender to the throne or as Duke of Braganza. The dispute dates back to 1828 when Duarte Pio's great-grandfather was said to have usurped the throne as King Miguel I, starting the Liberal Wars. Miguel's forces were defeated in 1834 by the forces led by his own brother. Miguel I was exiled and his niece, Queen Maria II, was restored to her throne. According to the Law of Banishment (Lei do Banimento) of 1834, Miguel I and all his descendants were forever excluded from the succession to the throne. This exclusion was reinforced four years later with the approval of the Constitution of 1838, which had a similar provision. However, the Constitutional Charter of 1826 was reinstated in 1842; this constitution (which was in place until 1910 when the monarchy was overthrown) did not bar Miguel's descendants from ascending the throne. Finally, the Law of Banishment of 1834 was repealed in 1950.

In 1912 and 1922, Duarte Pio's grandfather, Miguel Januário, Duke of Braganza, reconciled with King Manuel II, but this reconciliation was not accepted by all of their adherents. There are several monarchist organizations in Portugal (like the People's Monarchist Party) which maintain that only the Cortes or the National Assembly could legally determine the rightful claimant if ever Portugal decided to restore the monarchy. One monarchist group in Portugal that did support Miguel Januário, Duke of Braganza, instead of the deposed King Manuel II was the Integralismo Lusitano. The results of the Dover Pact (1912) and Paris Pact (1922) meetings remain controversial: although there was an accord on challenging the republic, there remained no clear agreement on hereditary lines of succession.

=== Parliamentary statements ===
In May 2006, the Portuguese Ministry of Foreign Affairs issued a statement where it referred to Duarte Pio as Duke of Braganza. On 5 July 2006, in response to this statement, Nuno da Câmara Pereira, then leader of the People's Monarchist Party, addressed the President of the Assembly of the Republic, asking for a clarification as to the official recognition of Duarte Pio as pretender to the throne and as Duke of Braganza. In its official response on 11 July 2006, the Ministry of Parliamentary Affairs restated the fact that the Portuguese constitution guarantees the republican regime, and that the reference to Duarte Pio as Duke of Braganza was merely a polite courtesy.

== Roles and positions ==
The Duke often interacts with both national and international political and cultural institutions, by which he represents the Portuguese people and their culture. Though not a head of state or official representative of the Portuguese state, Duarte Pio has been received with such honours by various foreign heads of state, government, and organizations.

=== Politics ===
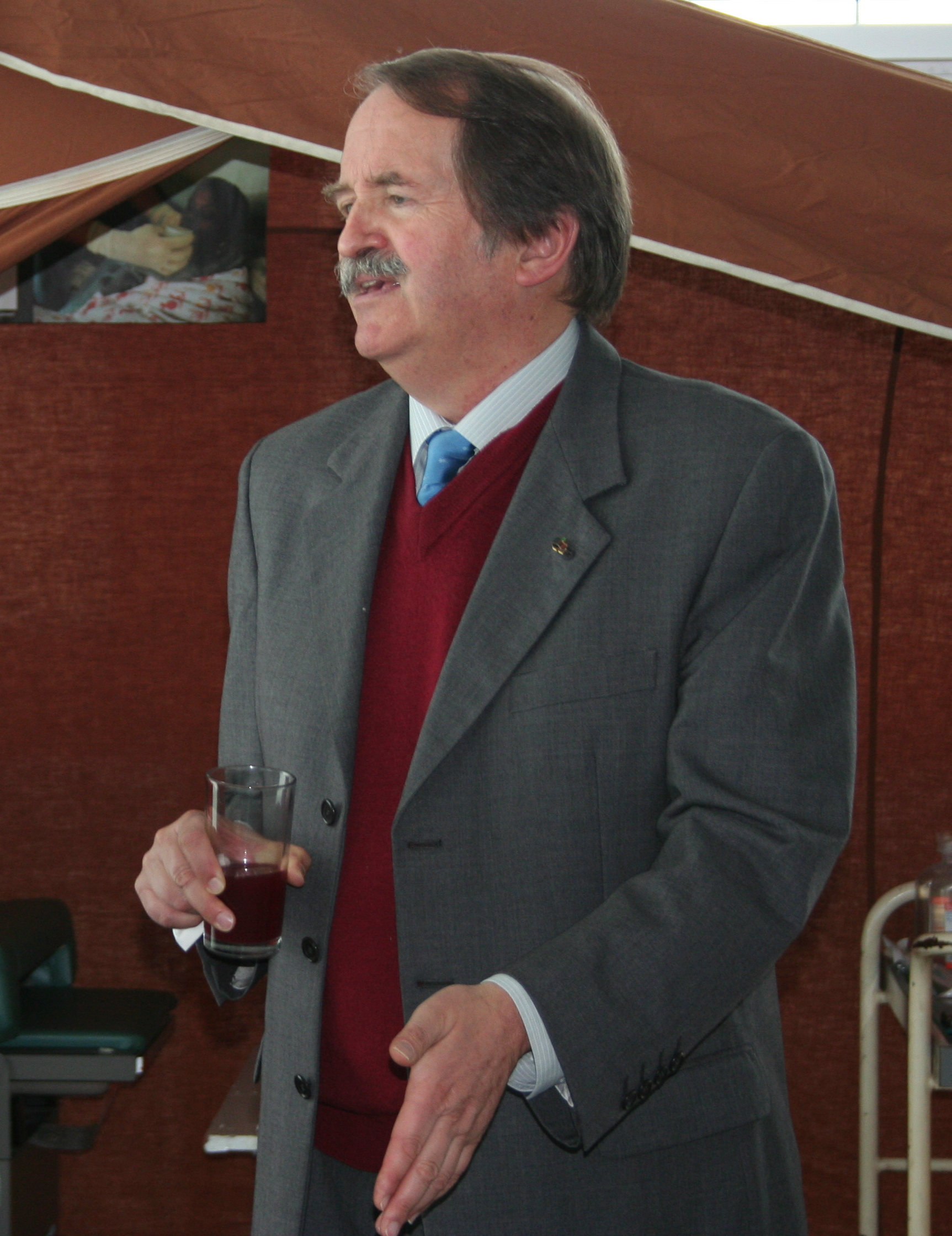
Duarte Pio, speaking at a conference in 2008

Dom Duarte was a major campaigner for the independence of Timor-Leste, a former Portuguese colony which was forcibly annexed by Indonesia in 1975. Before the issue's global popularity from the 1990s onward, the Duke contributed with several national and international campaigns for the political self-determination of the territory, including Timor 87 Vamos Ajudar and Lusitânia Expresso. In 1997, Dom Duarte also suggested a referendum on the independence of East Timor to the Indonesian Vice-President Jusuf Habibie. After Habibie became president of Indonesia in 1999, a referendum was held that resulted in the independence of the country.

In December 2010, Timor-Leste President José Ramos-Horta expressed his interest in making Duarte Pio a Timorese citizen, which the Duke accepted, because of the "profound and spiritual relations of the Timorese people with Portugal", continuing by saying that the symbols of the House of Braganza have a "great significance" in Timor-Leste. In February 2012, with final approval and support of Timor-Leste parliament, President Ramos-Horta conferred Timorese citizenship upon Duarte Pio, along with the Order of Merit. President Ramos-Horta stated that these honours were given because of Duarte Pio's "dedication of a large part of his life to defending justice and liberty for the Timorese people."

In September 2011, President Bashar al-Assad of Syria invited the Duke on a state visit to Damascus. The Duke stated he was invited by President al-Assad with the intention that Duarte Pio relay the Syrian head of state's plans and intents for Syria and its people. Duarte Pio told several Portuguese news outlets that it was the Syrian President's intention to "collaborate on the creation of a future constitution for Syria, close to that of Morocco, which guarantees political, religious, and press freedom." Alongside communicating the political and reformist intentions of the Syrian President, Duarte Pio stated that President al-Assad was a "good and well-intentioned man" and that "since he has assumed power, he has tried to democratize and humanize politics and [that] he has already achieved great advancements."

In his capacity as the President of the King Manuel II Foundation, Duarte Pio is often involved with the Community of Portuguese Language Countries, intergovernmental organization for economic, political, and cultural friendship between Portugal and many of its former colonies. In 2009, the Duke petitioned for the King Manuel II Foundation to become a consultative observer within the CPLP, but with no success. In 2012, Duarte Pio petitioned, with Maria Hermínia Cabral, Director of the Calouste Gulbenkian Foundation, for their respective organizations to become CPLP consultative observers, to which both succeeded in their endeavor. In November 2012, for a meeting of the consultative observers of the CPLP the Duke visited Mindelo, Cabo Verde. While there, the Duke visited various locations within Cabo Verde, and was received by President Jorge Carlos de Almeida Fonseca. During the visit, Duarte Pio decorated President Almeida Fonseca with the Order of the Immaculate Conception of Vila Viçosa. Duarte Pio often visits various municipalities around the country, in an official charge, for economic and political events. On 14 November 2007, the Duke visited the Santiago do Cacém Municipality and was received with honours by the President of the Municipality, in the Palace of the Concelho. On 11 October 2011, Duarte Pio visited the freguesia of São Pedro de Oliveira, in Braga, and was received with honours by the President of the Freguesia Augusto de Carvalho. On 28 March 2012, the Duke and his son, Afonso, Prince of Beira, were guests of honour at the XII Exposition of Folar and Products of the Earth, an exposition staged for the purpose of economic promotion of products from the Valpaços Municipality.

In 2014, the Court of Lisbon forbade Duarte Pio of Braganza from using the insignia of the Order of Saint Michael of the Wing and demanded that he compensate 300,000 euros to the legal owner of the rights, Nuno da Câmara Pereira, who allegedly registered the name "Order of Saint Michael of the Wing" in 1981, whereas Duarte Pio is said to have registered it in 2004. The condemnation was repeated on 5 October 2015, but on 3 November 2015, the rights of Nuno da Câmara Pereira to the symbols was lost, and on 7 December, Duarte Pio of Braganza won the case and regained the legal rights.

=== Culture ===
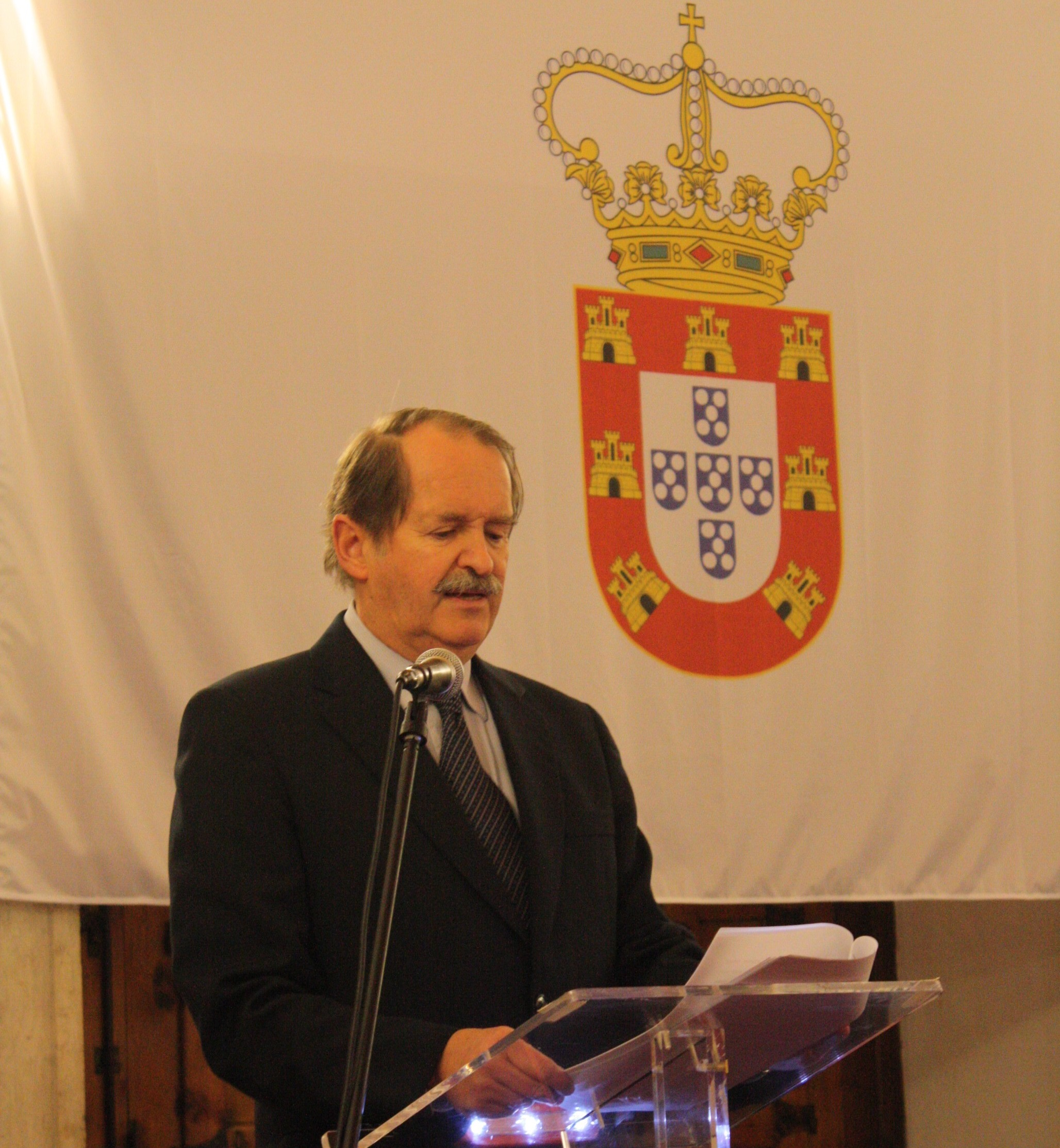
Duarte Pio giving his annual speech at the Forty Conspirators dinner

Duarte Pio often travels and visits various places, in an official charge, for matters concerning cultural affairs, both in Portugal and overseas. From 24 until 25 May 2009, the Duke visited Terceira Island, in the Azores Autonomous Region, as a guest of honour of the Santa Casa da Misericórdia, for the presentation of Mendo Castro Henriques's book, Dom Duarte e a Democracia – Uma Biografia Portuguesa. While in Terceira, Duarte Pio was received with honours by the President of the Municipality of Praia da Vitória and attended and visited various cultural and religious institutions and events, including a dinner at the Santa Casa da Misericórdia and assisting in a Portuguese bullfight.

On 12 September 2011, the Duke, as President of the Henry the Navigator Award, a partner award of the Duke of Edinburgh's Award, visited Funchal, in the Madeira Autonomous Region, for an official visit. While there, the Duke was received with honours by Miguel Albuquerque, President of the Municipality of Funchal, visited the Municipal Gardens of Funchal and held a ceremony for the presentation of the Henry the Navigator Award. On 30 September 2011, Duarte Pio visited Vila Franca de Xira, as a guest of honour for the Royal Tourada, and visited various cultural institutions of the municipality, including the Museum of Neo-Realism and the Celeiro da Patriarcal. On 8 January 2012, the Duke visited the Vila Verde Municipality, as a special guest of the Association for Regional Development of Minho, where he attended an exhibition on regional culture and products and was presented a traditional Lenço de Namorados, made in 1912.

Every year, on 1 December, Restoration Day, the Duke gives his annual speech in honour of the Portuguese Restoration at the dinner of the Forty Conspirators. It was on 1 December 1640 that João II, Duke of Braganza, an ancestor of Duarte Pio, deposed the Portuguese House of Habsburg, installed the House of Braganza as the reigning house of Portugal, and restored sovereign rule to Portugal. In his speeches, the Duke reflects on the historical significance of the date, events of the previous year, and the road ahead for both Portugal in general and the monarchist cause. In 2012, Restoration Day ceased to be an official holiday of the Portuguese state, prompting Duarte Pio to speak out against the action, stating that extinction of the official holiday "devalues the day which should unite the Portuguese".

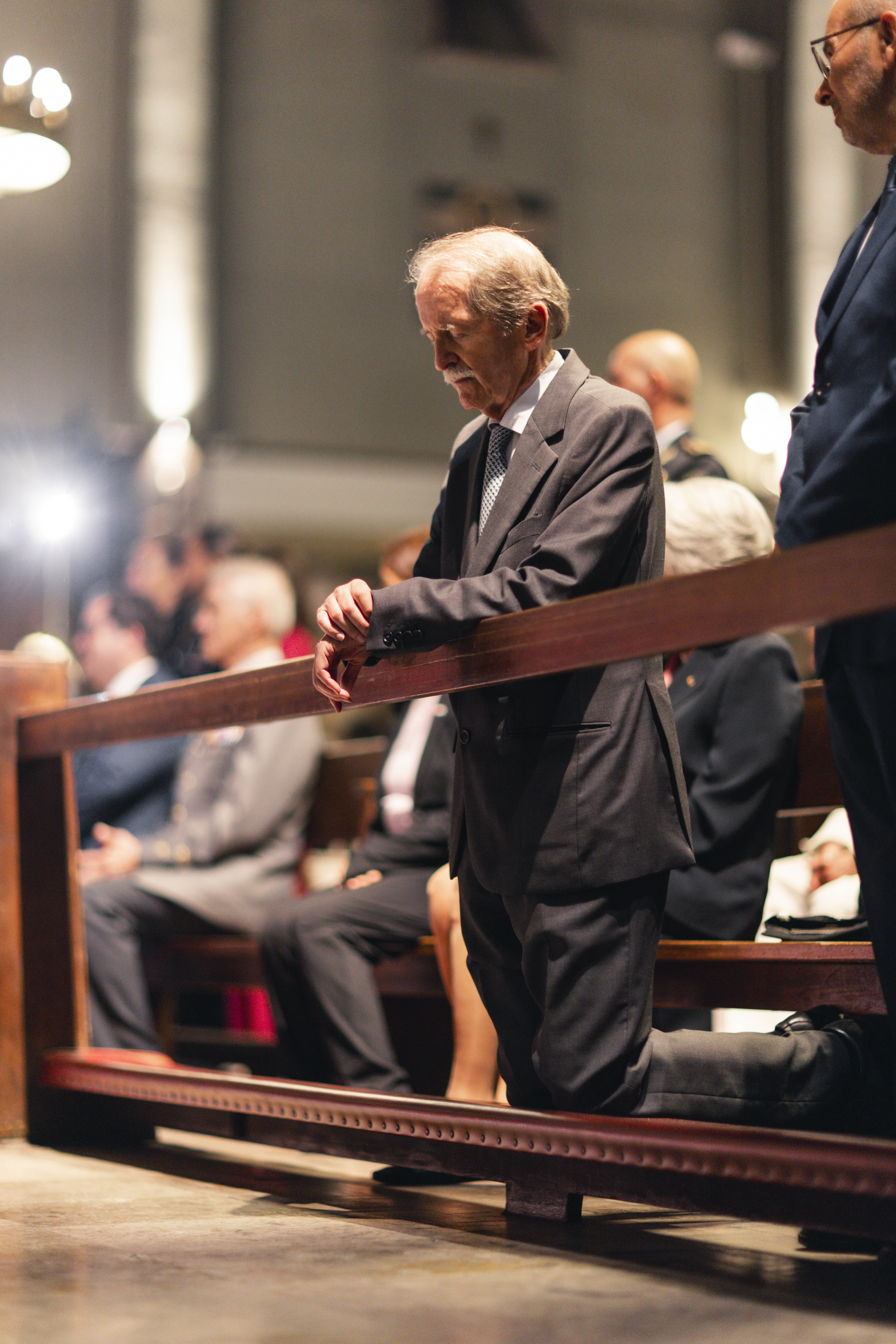
In 2025, Duarte Pio attending the closing Mass of the Jubilee of Authorities at the Church of Our Lady of the Rosary of Fátima in Lisbon, presided over by Cardinal Pietro Parolin

== Marriage and issue ==
On 13 May 1995, Dom Duarte Pio married Isabel Inês de Castro Curvelo de Herédia, a Portuguese businesswoman and descendant of nobility. This was the first marriage of a member of the Portuguese royal family to take place in Portugal since the marriage of King Carlos I in 1886. The ceremony was celebrated in the Monastery of Jerónimos in Lisbon and presided over by Cardinal António Ribeiro, Patriarch of Lisbon. Present at the ceremony were representatives of various European royal and noble houses. These included Prince Philippe of Belgium, Duke of Brabant, Prince Henri, Hereditary Grand Duke of Luxembourg and Infanta Margarita of Spain, Duchess of Soria, among others. The principal Portuguese political figures, including the President of the Republic Mário Soares, Prime Minister Aníbal Cavaco Silva, and President of the Assembly António Barbosa de Melo, were also present.

Following her marriage, Isabel de Herédia began a gradual withdrawal from her professional life, a process which was completed by the time her eldest child, Afonso of Braganza, was born. Thereafter, Isabel has devoted herself to the care of her family and the patronage of various charities. Duarte Pio and Isabel de Herédia have three children:

| Name | Birth | Notes |
|---|---|---|
| Afonso, Prince of Beira | 25 March 1996 | 16th Prince of Beira, 18th Duke of Barcelos; 2nd in line in the succession |
| Maria Francisca, Duchess of Coimbra | 3 March 1997 | 5th Duchess of Coimbra, Infanta of Portugal; 4th in line in the succession |
| Dinis, Duke of Porto | 25 November 1999 | 4th Duke of Porto, Infante of Portugal; 3rd in line in the succession |

In December 2022, the engagement of Maria Francisca to a Lisbon-based lawyer, Duarte de Sousa Araújo Martins, was announced: the couple married on 7 October 2023 at the Basilica of the Palace of Mafra.

In June 2026, the engagement of Dinis to Countess Anna Schaffgotsch von und zu Kynast und Greiffenstein, Baroness of Trachenberg, daughter of Austrian Counts Maximilian and Marie Schaffgotsch, was announced.

== Line of succession ==
The list below includes line of succession of the Miguelist branch.

- Miguel I of Portugal (1802–1866)
  - Prince Miguel, Duke of Braganza (1853–1927)
    - Duarte Nuno, Duke of Braganza (1907–1976)
      - Duarte Pio, Duke of Braganza (born 1945)
        - (1) Afonso, Prince of Beira (b. 1996)
        - (2) Dinis, Duke of Porto (b. 1999)
        - (3) Maria Francisca, Duchess of Coimbra (b. 1997)
      - (4) Miguel, Duke of Viseu (b. 1946)

== Honours ==
=== Foreign ===
- Knight Grand Cross of Honour and Devotion of the Sovereign Military Order of Malta
- Grand Collar of the Order of Timor-Leste (East Timor)
- Gold Medal of Merit (Italian Red Cross)

=== Dynastic ===
- Grand Master of the Order of the Immaculate Conception of Vila Viçosa
- Grand Master of the Order of Saint Michael of the Wing
- Knight of the Order of the Golden Fleece (House of Habsburg)
- Grand Cross of the Imperial Order of the Rose (Brazilian House of Orléans-Braganza)
- Knight of the Order of Saint Januarius (Castroan House of Bourbon-Two Sicilies)
- Bailiff Knight Grand Cross with Collar of Justice of the Sacred Military Constantinian Order of Saint George (Calabrian House of Bourbon-Two Sicilies)
- Grand Cordon of the Royal and Hashemite Order of the Pearl (Royal House of Sulu)
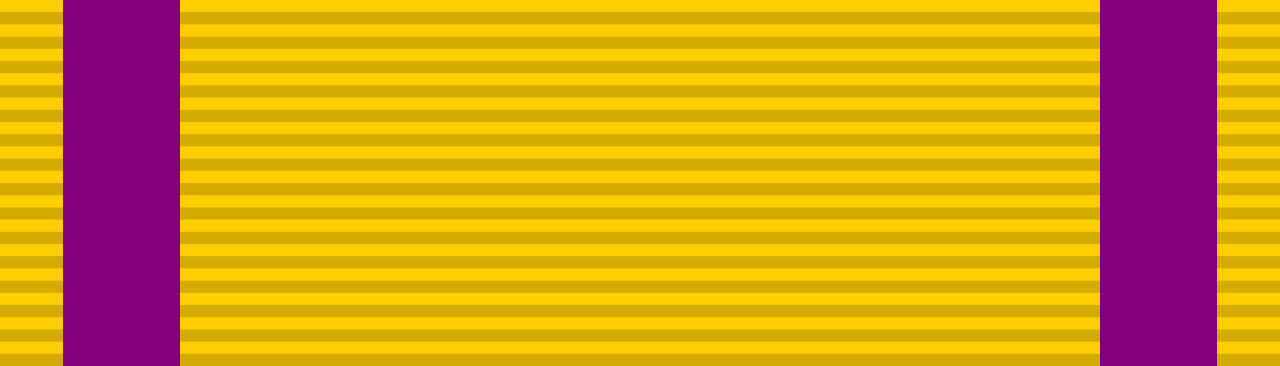
- Grand Cordon of the Royal Order of the Crown (Royal House of Laʻanui)

=== Other ===
Heritage Award for Peacemaker from the Sino-Phil Asia International Peace Awards Foundation

Duarte Pio, Duke of Braganza House of Braganza Cadet branch of the House of Aviz Born: 15 May 1945
Portuguese royalty
| Preceded by Duarte Nuno | Duke of Braganza; 24 December 1976–present | Incumbent; Heir: Afonso |
| Vacant Title last held by Luís Filipe | Prince of Beira; Duke of Barcelos; 15 May 1945 – 24 December 1976 | Succeeded by Afonso |
Titles in pretence
| Preceded by Duarte Nuno | — TITULAR — King of Portugal and the Algarves; 24 December 1976–present Reason for succession failure: Kingdom abolished in 1910 | Incumbent; Heir: Afonso |
