= Guisande e Oliveira (São Pedro) =

- Civil parish
- Location in Portugal
- Coordinates: 41.483°N 8.446°W
- Country: Portugal
- Region: Norte
- Intermunic. comm.: Cávado
- District: Braga
- Municipality: Braga

Area
  - Total: 4.71 km^{2} (1.82 sq mi)

Population (2011)
  - Total: 1,053
  - Density: 224/km^{2} (579/sq mi)
- Time zone: UTC+00:00 (WET)
  - Summer (DST): UTC+01:00 (WEST)

Guisande e Oliveira (São Pedro) is a civil parish in the municipality of Braga, Portugal. It was formed in 2013 by the merger of the former parishes Guisande and Oliveira (São Pedro). The population in 2011 was 1,053, in an area of 4.71 km^{2} (1.82 sq mi).

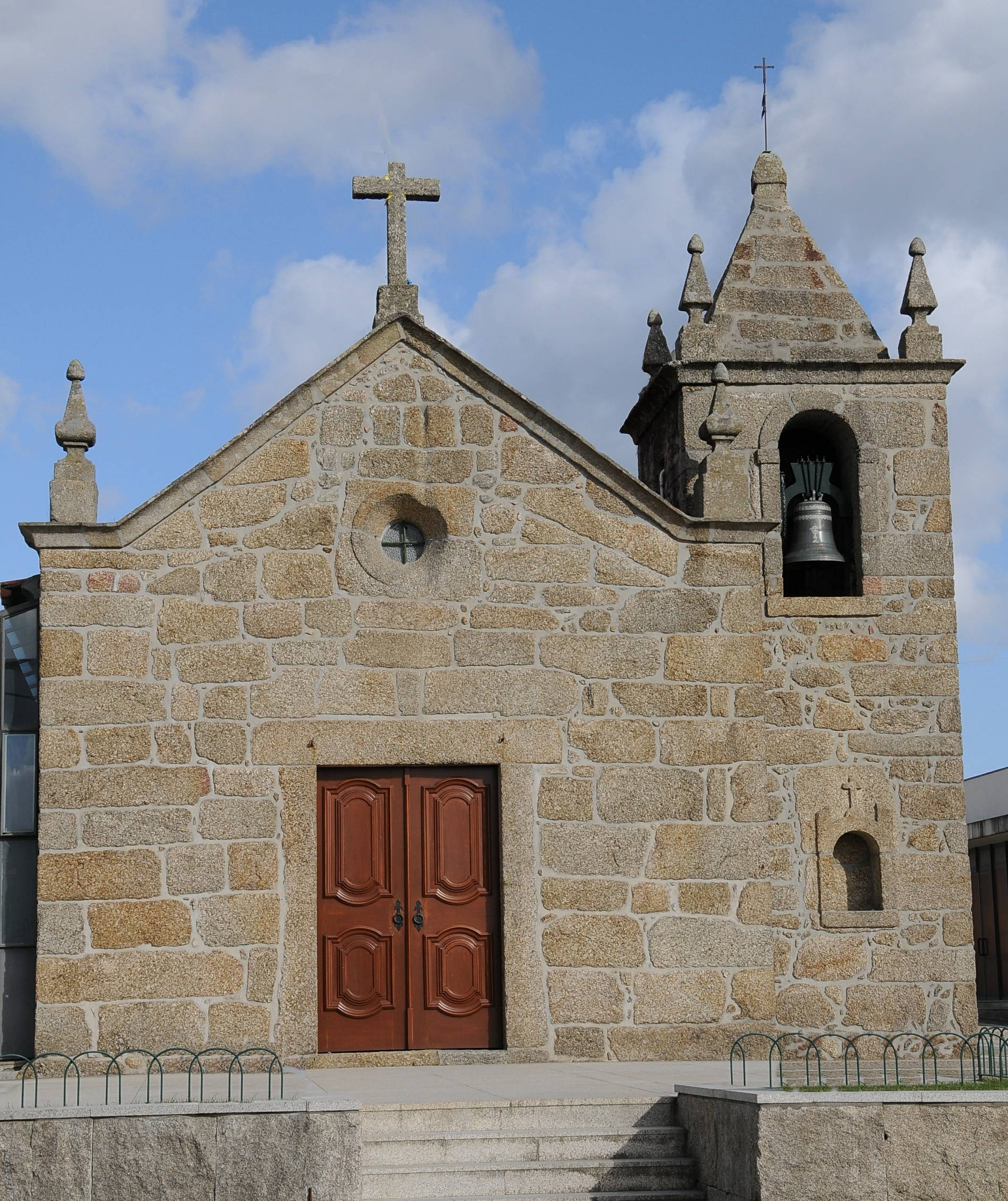
Guisande Church

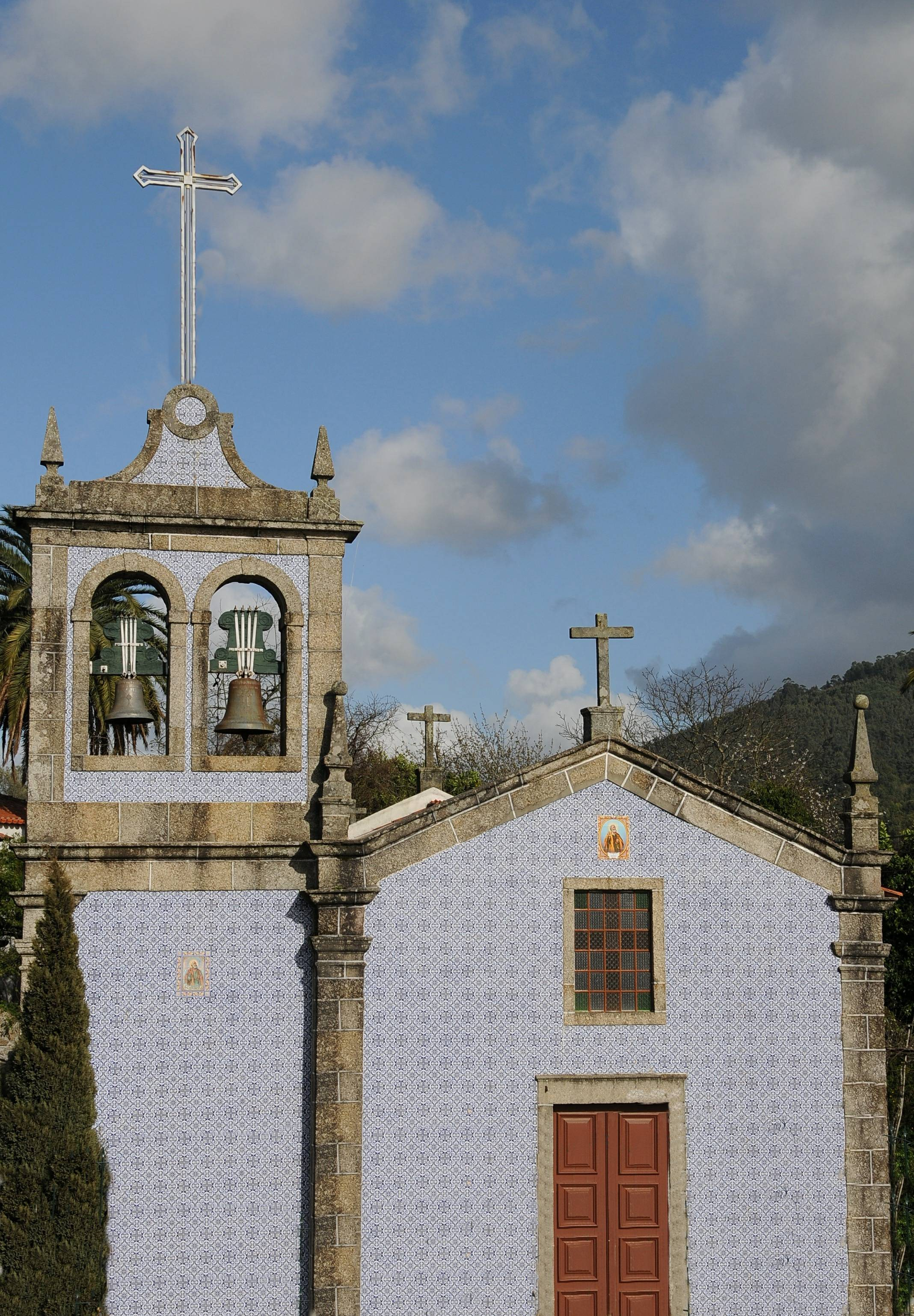
Oliveira Church
