= Colégio Planalto =

Location
- R. Armindo Rodrigues 28; Lisbon, 1600-414; Portugal

Information
- Type: Private school
- Motto: Surge Ut Aquila
- Religious affiliation: Opus Dei
- Established: 1978; 48 years ago
- Founder: Parents
- Head teacher: Arq. Ricardo Roque Martins
- Gender: Boys
- Age range: 1–18
- Average class size: 18
- Hours in school day: 8
- Colour: Burgundy
- Affiliations: Colégio Mira Rio; Colégio Cedros; Colégio Horizonte
- Website: www.colegioplanalto.pt

Colégio Planalto is a Portuguese boys-only school, located in Lisbon, Portugal. It is a Catholic school and a member of the IB Diploma Programme. Opus Dei, an institution of the Catholic Church, is in charge of its religious teachings and services.

== History ==
The school was created in 1978 by a group of parents that were discontent with the national school system.

The school's programme focuses on personalized education (as promoted and formalised by Professor Victor Garcia Hoz), being particularly renowned for its excellent academics and catholic teachings. The school offers education for all years from kingergarden to high school, offering the International Baccalaureate programme.

Although the school accepts students from faiths and religions, the educational programme practiced in the school is of deep Catholic underpinnings with a particular preoccupation of involving the parents in the school's activities and programs. The school is very associated with the Opus Dei, not only drawing from it its values and principles, but also through the presence of ecclesiastics including their involvement in classes. The nomination of chaplains and Religion teachers is, therefore, a responsibility of the Opus Dei prelature. The school's chapel was consecrated by José Policarpo.

== About ==
The school is widely known for its excellent standard and very good position in the national ranking of schools. The school received national mediatic attention several times because of its choice to be an all-boys school, something rare in Portugal. However, the schools presents this choice as a conscious one made in order for students to focus on academics.

Although it is usually regarded as a school for upper-class students this is not the reality as the school hosts students from various socio-economical backgrounds.

Since school year 2024/2025, Planalto has established and enforced a strict no-mobile phones policy for students, except in rare occasions and for class-deemed purposes only, sanctioned by teachers. This policy aims for higher focus on academic duties and promotion of healthier interpersonal relationships.
