= Duke of Coimbra =

Portuguese noble title

Coat of arms of Infante Pedro, the 1st Duke of Coimbra

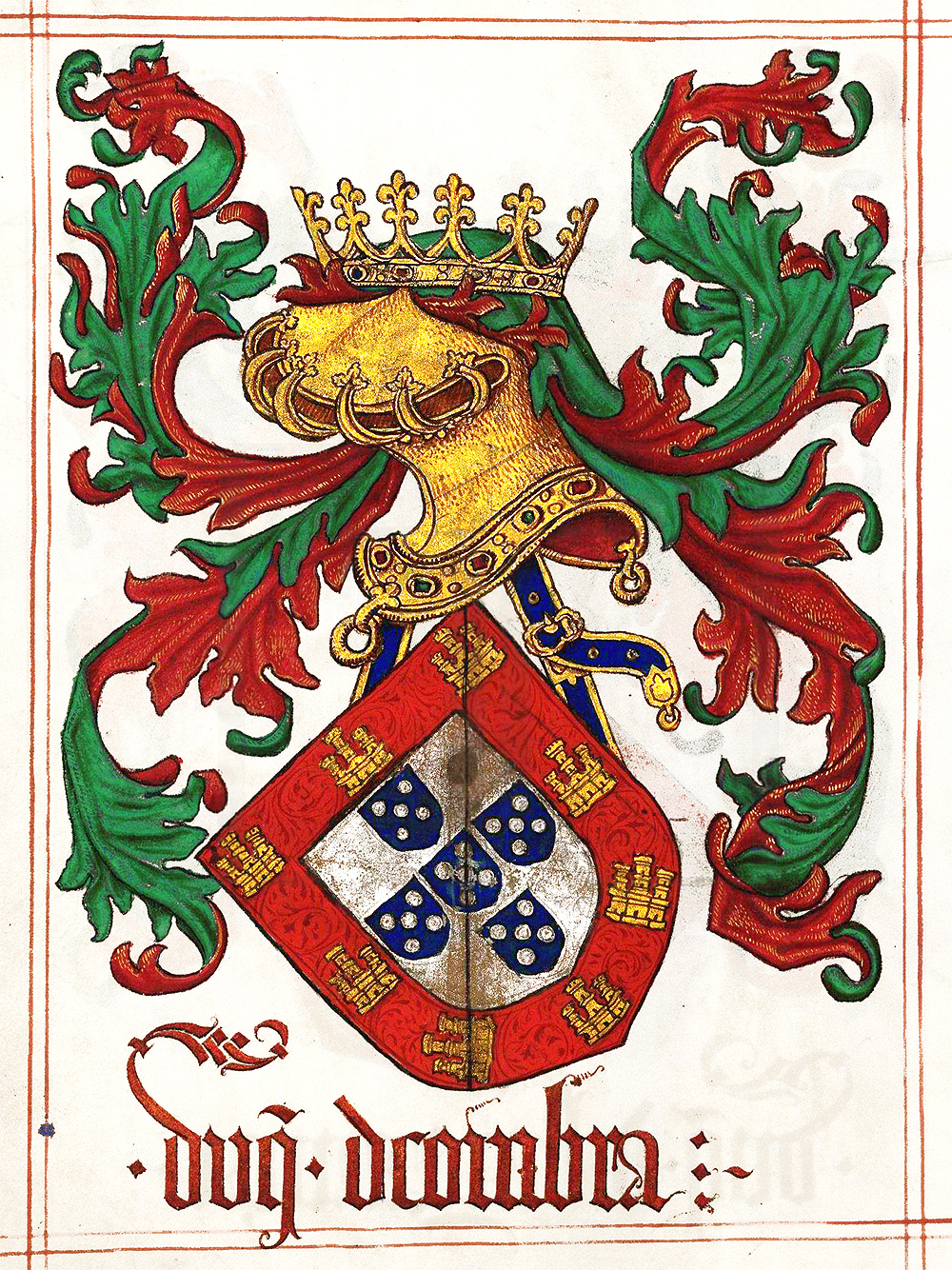
Coat of arms of Infante George, the 2nd Duke of Coimbra

Duke of Coimbra (Portuguese: Duque de Coimbra) was an aristocratic Portuguese title with the level of royal dukedom, that is, associated with the Portuguese royal house, created in 1415, by King John I of Portugal to his 2nd male son, Infante Pedro. Pedro was regent of the kingdom but he was killed in the domestic Battle of Alfarrobeira (1449).

None of their children inherited this title, which was granted much later to Pedro's great-grandson, Jorge, Duke of Coimbra, natural son of King John II of Portugal.

== List of dukes of Coimbra ==
1. Infante Pedro, Duke of Coimbra (1392–1449), Regent, King João I's third son (second surviving);
2. Jorge, Duke of Coimbra (1481–1550), King João II's natural son;
3. Infante Augusto, Duke of Coimbra (1847–1889), Queen Maria II's fifth son;

=== Claimants ===
Following the establishment of the Portuguese Republic, the following individuals have claimed the title of Duke of Coimbra:

1. Infante Henrique, Duke of Coimbra (1949–2017), Duarte Nuno, Duke of Braganza's third son;
2. Infanta Maria Francisca, Duchess of Coimbra (born 1997), Duarte Pio, Duke of Braganza's daughter.

== See also ==
- Dukedoms in Portugal

== Bibliography ==
”Nobreza de Portugal e do Brasil" – Vol. I, pages 255/272; and Vol. II, pages 531/532. Published by Zairol Lda., Lisbon 1989.
