= Prince of Beira =

Portuguese noble title

Prince of Beira (Portuguese: Príncipe da Beira, feminine: Princesa da Beira) is a title traditionally granted to the heir apparent to the throne of Portugal. The title's original use that it be granted on the eldest daughter of the reigning monarch of Portugal. Tied with the title of Prince of Beira, is Duke of Barcelos, as heir to the Duke of Braganza and Prince of Brazil (later Prince Royal of Portugal).

The title's name has its origins in the Beira province in central Portugal.

== History ==
The title was presumably created (no records of its earlier existence or grants) by King John IV of Portugal, the new monarch, first of the Braganza dynasty, sometime in the 1640s. It was firstly given to his eldest surviving daughter, Infanta Joanna of Portugal, 1st Princess of Beira. It was the King's intention that the male heir apparent would be Prince of Brazil and later also Duke of Braganza, whereas Princess of Beira was originally quite similar to that of French Madame Royale or the British Princess Royal. The title had no original connection to being one for next heirs of the throne - King John IV had a second son, and soon a third, but the daughter kept Beira and the boys received dukedoms (Braganza and Beja). However, Joanna died young in 1653.

Afterwards, the title kept being granted and regranted several times during the remaining Portuguese monarchy. However, the precedent of being granted to the monarch's eldest daughter in a situation where he had several living sons, was repeated sometimes in later centuries.

The title's first connection with the position of the heir was from 1669 onwards, when it was held by the Infanta Isabel Luísa, Princess of Beira (1669–90), the only then living child of King Peter II. She received it as the eldest daughter of the king, but as she also was the heiress presumptive until 1688, a new tradition got its groundwork.

According to the first tradition, the next holder would be Infanta Barbara of Portugal (1711–58), the eldest daughter of King John V of Portugal. In 1729, she wedded Infante Fernando of Spain, the Prince of Asturias.

Then, on December 17, 1734 the title was created anew by King John V of Portugal, in favour of his newborn eldest granddaughter Infanta Maria Francisca. She was the eldest daughter of the heir-apparent of the monarch. This was the first time when it was granted two generations down from the monarch. As the future Joseph I (the then Prince of Brazil) was to remain without sons, the new Princess of Beira would later become the proclaimed heiress and ultimately to ascend the throne.

In 1750 the newly ascended King Joseph I (believing that no sons would be forthcoming--indeed, his wife and he produced no further issue after 1746, as is known in hindsight) proclaimed his eldest daughter the official heiress and granted her the "crown-princely" title Princess of Brazil (but apparently not that Duke of Braganza). He in 1761 further granted Maria's eldest son, Infante Dom José Francisco (1761–88), the title Prince of Beira. For the first time, the title was held by a male.

This created a new tradition. The situation now, effectively, was that the king's official heir held the Princedom of Brazil, and Prince of Beira was Brazil's heir-apparent. The situation had been the same (though unintentionally) during 1734-50, when the monarch's heir-apparent was Prince of Brazil, and Brazil's obvious heir was Princess of Beira. This was to be repeated after that time, as monarchs granted Beira to the second heir-apparent whenever possible.

(The way the titles Duke of Braganza and Prince of Brazil were held is identical with the way the titles of Duke of Cornwall and of Rothesay are held in the UK. The male heir apparent received it when the relevant parent ascended the throne or, if the title was vacant, at birth. During the 1645-1822 period, the Prince of Brazil always belonged to the heir apparent to the throne, who also received the title Duke of Braganza. In 1750 though, Brazil--but not Braganza--was specifically granted to the female heiress, as she was proclaimed the official successor.)

The future King John VI himself never became Prince of Beira--he became Prince of Brazil and Duke of Braganza directly at the death of his elder brother.

According to the first tradition, the next holder of Beira would be Infanta Mariana Vitória of Portugal (1768–88), the eldest daughter of Maria I and Pedro III. She died two months after her eldest brother. In 1785, she was married to Infante Gabriel of Spain (1752–88), whom she predeceased by some weeks. Their three children were granted Infantes of Portugal in addition to that of Spain by their grandmother. The others going having died, the eldest son, Infante Pedro Carlos of Spain and Portugal (1786–1812) married his Portuguese cousin Teresa, Princess of Beira, and left issue (see below).

Queen Maria I and her regent, the future King John VI, granted the Beira in turn to John's heirs-apparent, and the second of them, Infante Dom Pedro Francisco survived to become in 1816 the Prince of Brazil, the last Portuguese heir-apparent to hold that title (as he himself later made Brazil independent).

King John VI followed the first tradition also, and Beira was granted to his eldest daughter Infanta Dona Maria Teresa. She was firstly the wife of her short-lived cousin Infante Pedro Carlos of Spain and Portugal and secondly the wife of the first Carlist pretender, Infante Don Carlos of Spain. Teresa's only child was her son with Pedro Carlos, Infante Don Sebastian of Spain and Portugal(1811–75), from whom the Dukes of Marchena, Durcal, Ansola and Hernani descend.

In the second tradition, when born in 1821, the then Prince of Brazil's eldest son João Carlos was granted Beira in 1821 after birth, he being the third in the heir-apparent line, but he died the following year, some months before Brazil's secession. Emperor Pedro's next son, born in 1825, received no title from Portugal. The constitutional charter of Portugal dated April 29, 1826 stated that the eldest son to the heir apparent shall bear the title of Prince of Beira.

According to the first tradition, the next holder would be Infanta Maria da Glória Joana (1819–53), the eldest daughter of King Pedro IV. She, however, ascended the throne in May 1826 as Queen Maria II.

The second tradition-based need arose only in 1887, when Infante Dom Luís Filipe was born in the last years of his grandfather King Luís I's reign. Luís Filipe was Prince of Beira 1887-89 and then succeeded his own father, the new king, as crown prince, becoming 21st Duke of Braganza.

== List of princes of Beira ==
=== As eldest daughter of the reigning monarch ===
Image	Name	Lifespan	Tenure	Parents
	Joana	18 September 1635 — 17 November 1653	27 October 1645 — 17 November 1653	John IV of Portugal; Luisa de Guzmán
	Catarina	25 November 1638 — 31 December 1705	17 November 1653 — 23 April 1662	John IV of Portugal; Luisa de Guzmán
	Isabel Luísa	6 January 1669 — 22 October 1690	6 January 1669 — 22 October 1690	Peter II of Portugal; Maria Francisca of Savoy
	Maria Bárbara	4 December 1711 — 27 August 1758	4 December 1711 — 17 December 1734	John V of Portugal; Maria Anna of Austria

=== As eldest child to the heir apparent ===
Image	Name	Lifespan	Tenure	Parents
	Maria Francisca	17 December 1734 — March 20, 1816	17 December 1734 — 31 July 1750	Joseph I of Portugal; Mariana Victoria of Spain
	José Francisco	20 August 1761 — 11 September 1788	20 August 1761 — 24 February 1777	Maria I of Portugal; Peter III of Portugal
	Maria Teresa	29 April 1793 — 17 January 1874	29 April 1793 — 21 March 1795	John VI of Portugal; Carlota Joaquina of Spain
	Francisco António	21 March 1795 — 11 June 1801	21 March 1795 — 11 June 1801	John VI of Portugal; Carlota Joaquina of Spain
	Pedro de Alcântara	12 October 1798 — 24 September 1834	11 June 1801 — 20 March 1816	John VI of Portugal; Carlota Joaquina of Spain
	Maria da Glória	4 April 1819 — 15 November 1853	4 April 1819 — 6 March 1821; 4 February 1822 — 12 October 1822	Pedro IV of Portugal; Maria Leopoldina of Austria
	Miguel	26 April 1820	26 April 1820	Pedro IV of Portugal; Maria Leopoldina of Austria
	João Carlos	6 March 1821 — 4 February 1822	6 March 1821 — 4 February 1822	Pedro IV of Portugal; Maria Leopoldina of Austria
	Luís Filipe	21 March 1887 — 1 February 1908	21 March 1887 — 19 October 1889	Carlos I of Portugal; Amélie of Orléans

=== As heirs of the pretenders to the Portuguese throne ===
Image	Name	Lifespan	Tenure	Parents
	Duarte Pio	15 May 1945 — Present	15 May 1945 — 24 December 1976	Duarte Nuno of Braganza; Maria Francisca of Orléans-Braganza
	Afonso	25 March 1996 — Present	25 March 1996 — Present	Duarte Pio of Braganza; Isabel de Herédia

== See also ==
- Prince of Brazil
- Prince Royal of Portugal
