= Infante of Portugal =

Portuguese Royal title for men

Infante of Portugal (Portuguese: Infante de Portugal; f. Infanta), was the royal title of the Kingdom of Portugal, granted to the sons or daughters of the King and Princes of Portugal who were not the heir to the throne. It was also used to denote a grandson or granddaughter in the male line of a reigning monarch. Female consorts of Infantes of Portugal automatically gained the title of nobility of Infanta when married. Male consorts to Infantas of Portugal did not have an inherent right to the title of Infante upon marriage (cf., for instance, Nuno José Severo de Mendoça Rolim de Moura Barreto, 1st Duke of Loulé).

== See also ==
- Kingdom of Portugal
- Prince Royal of Portugal
- Prince of Brazil
- Prince of Portugal
- Prince of Beira
- House of the Infantado
