= Duke of Braganza =

Hereditary title in the Peerage of Portugal

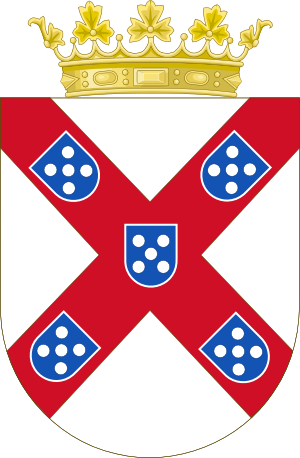
- Creation date: 1442
- Created by: Afonso V of Portugal
- Peerage: Peerage of Portugal
- First holder: Afonso I of Braganza
- Present holder: Duarte Pio, Duke of Braganza
- Remainder to: Heir Apparent of the Throne of Portugal
- Subsidiary titles: Prince of Brazil, Prince Royal of Portugal, Duke of Guimarães, Marquis of Vila Viçosa, Count of Ourém, Count of Arraiolos, Count of Neiva, Count of Faria

The title Duke of Braganza (Portuguese: Duque de Bragança) in the House of Braganza is one of the most important titles in the peerage of Portugal. Starting in 1640, when the House of Braganza acceded to the throne of Portugal, the male heir of the Portuguese Crown were known as Duke of Braganza, along with their style Prince of Beira or (from 1645 to 1816) Prince of Brazil. The tradition of the heir to the throne being titled Duke of Braganza was revived by various pretenders after the establishment of the Portuguese Republic on 5 October 1910 to signify their claims to the throne.

== History of Dukedom ==
=== Feudal dukes ===
The Duke of Braganza holds one of the most important dukedoms in Portugal, see Duchy of Braganza (Bragança). Created in 1442 by King Afonso V of Portugal for his uncle Afonso, Count of Barcelos (natural son of King John I of Portugal), it is one of the oldest fiefdoms in Portugal.

The fifth Duke of Braganza (Teodósio I, b. 1510) is especially important to historians of international trade as when he died in 1563, the contents of the family's main palace in Vila Vicosa, were inventoried in their entirety. Because Portugal had established a global trade network for sixty-odd years by the time of the Duke's death, and was "in the process of establishing their military, religious and commercial presence, sailors, merchants, priests and crown officials had developed sophisticated, transcontinental trading practices that involved all sorts of global commodities, the inventory is a priceless resource to art historians as it lists artefacts originating in Mozambique, the western coast of India, Malacca, China, Japan, Morocco, and Brazil. Slaves were also included in the inventory; one of the duke's slaves, a gifted artist, ranking amongst the "top 100 most expensive items in the whole inventory".

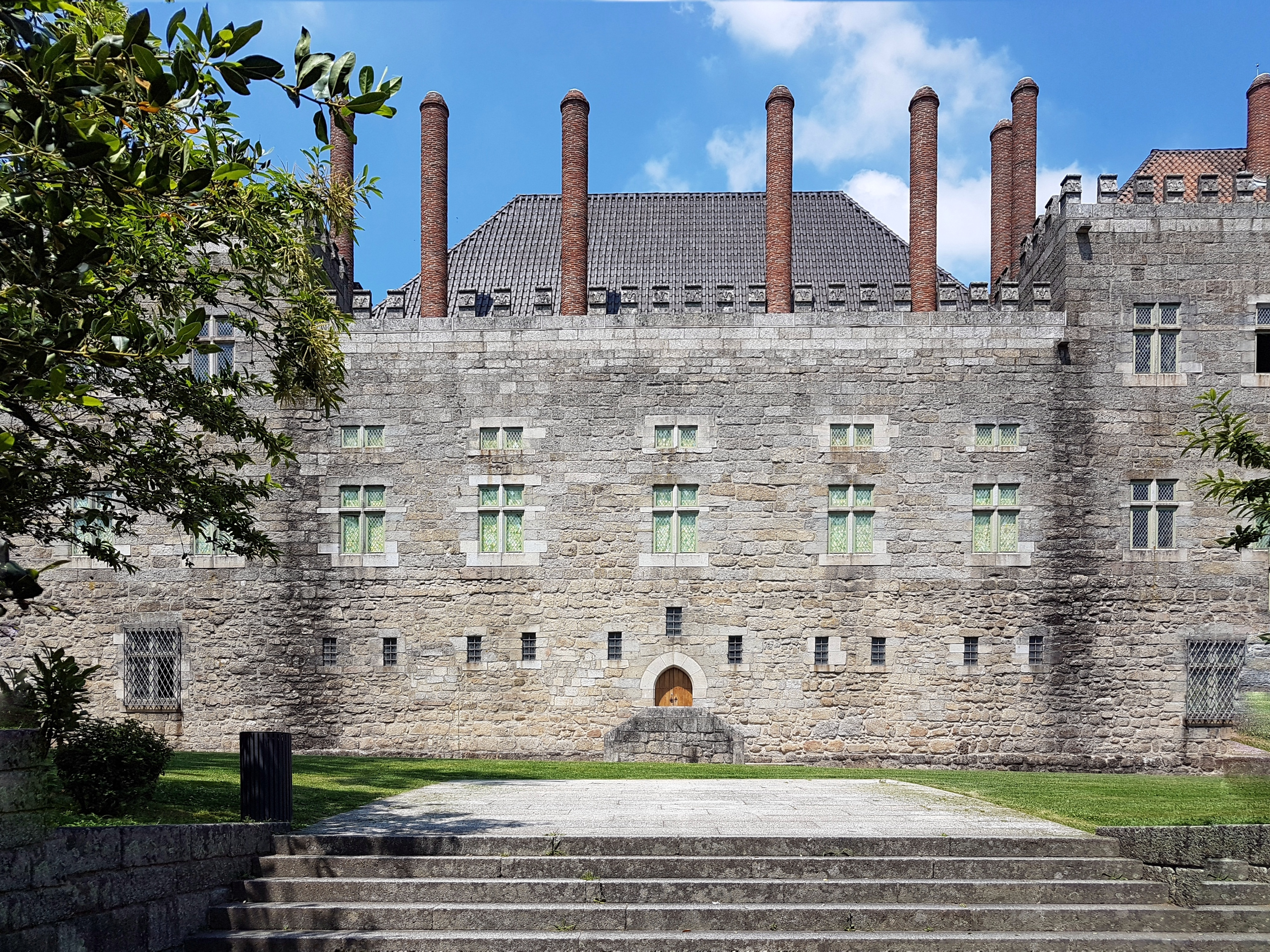
Palace of the Dukes of Braganza

By 1640, Portugal was on the verge of rebellion against Spanish-based Habsburg rule, and a new Portuguese king had to be found. The choice fell upon John, 8th Duke of Braganza, who had a claim to the throne of Portugal both through his grandmother Catherine of Guimarães, a legitimate granddaughter of King Manuel I, and through his great-great-grandfather, the 4th duke of Braganza, a nephew of King Manuel I. John was a modest man without particular ambitions to the crown. Legend has it that his wife Luisa of Guzman urged him to accept the offer by saying, "I'd rather be queen for one day than duchess for a lifetime". He accepted the leadership of the rebellion against Spain, which was successful, and was acclaimed King John IV of Portugal on 1 December 1640.

=== Dukedom in the Braganza monarchy ===
After the accession of the House of Braganza to the Portuguese throne in 1640 as a replacement for the Philippine Dynasty of Spanish Habsburgs, the Dukedom of Braganza became linked to the crown. "Duke of Braganza" became the traditional title of the heir to the Portuguese throne, together with or alternate to "Prince of Beira", much as "Prince of Wales" is in the United Kingdom. After the 8th Duke had ascended the royal throne, he elevated his son and heir Teodósio to the newly created rank of Prince of Brazil in 1645, but granted the Duchy of Braganza to his brother, the Infante Duarte, who died in 1649 in Spanish captivity. Then it was granted to the king's second son, the future Afonso VI of Portugal.

From this time onwards, the title "Duke of Braganza" was kept for the heir apparent of the throne – in its strictest sense. Although the other title for an unavoidable heir, that of "Prince of Brazil", was from time to time granted even to female heirs, the Dukedom of Braganza was always reserved only for the male heir except for two extraordinary creations, in 1683 and 1711. These two creations are deemed invalid by some legalists, who accordingly number the dukes in a way that Luís Filipe, Prince Royal of Portugal, the last Duke of Braganza during the period of Portuguese monarchy, is reckoned to be the 21st Duke. The present table reflects a numbering that specifies him as the 21st Duke.

When Emperor Pedro I of Brazil abdicated his throne in 1831, he claimed the title of Duke of Braganza.

On 1 February 1908 King Charles I of Portugal was murdered along with his eldest son and heir, Luís Filipe, the last individual during the monarchy to carry that title. Carlos was succeeded by Manuel II of Portugal but for a short time: on 5 October 1910, a republic was instituted, and the king was exiled. King Manuel II then settled in England.

=== Dukes in the post-monarchy era ===
After the foundation of the Portuguese Republic in 1910, the tradition of the heir to the throne being titled Duke of Braganza was revived by various pretenders to signify their claims to the throne.

In the last years of the deposed king Manuel II of Portugal, the dukedom of Bragança was claimed by Miguel Januário of Braganza, son of the exiled king Miguel I of Portugal, who was living in the Austrian Empire. His branch of the Braganza family allegedly became heirs to the crown in 1932, when Manuel II died without children. These Braganzas were officially allowed to return to the country in 1950 and have lived there ever since.

Presently, the commonly acknowledged duke of Braganza and Portuguese heir is Duarte Pio of Braganza (born 1945). Unlike other European republics (such as Greece) which attempt to prevent the presence of former royal houses in their lands, republican Portugal and its claimants to the throne have long been reconciled, a fact shown when among the guests at the wedding of Duarte Pio was the President of the Portuguese Republic and the country's prime minister.

In contrast to Duarte Pio and his family's claim, Maria Pia of Saxe-Coburg and Gotha Braganza has made claim to the title of Duchess of Braganza and Queen of Portugal, since 1932.

== List of dukes of Braganza ==
=== Use of titles in the Portuguese Republic ===
With the end of the Portuguese monarchy in 1910, all titles of Portuguese nobility were initially abolished. Notwithstanding, although the status of nobility has not been recognised in law since 1910, legitimate titles of nobility (those granted by a reigning monarch before 5 October 1910) have been given legal recognition and protection, including under article 26 of the Portuguese Constitution, in conjunction with articles 70 and 72 of the Civil Code, as established by decision of Portugal's Supreme Court of Justice in 2014.

== Bibliography ==
- "Nobreza de Portugal e Brasil", Vol. II, pages 433/449. Published by Zairol Lda., 1989, Lisbon.
