= Duke Ludwig Wilhelm in Bavaria (1831–1920) =

Bavarian royal in Germany

Ludwig Wilhelm
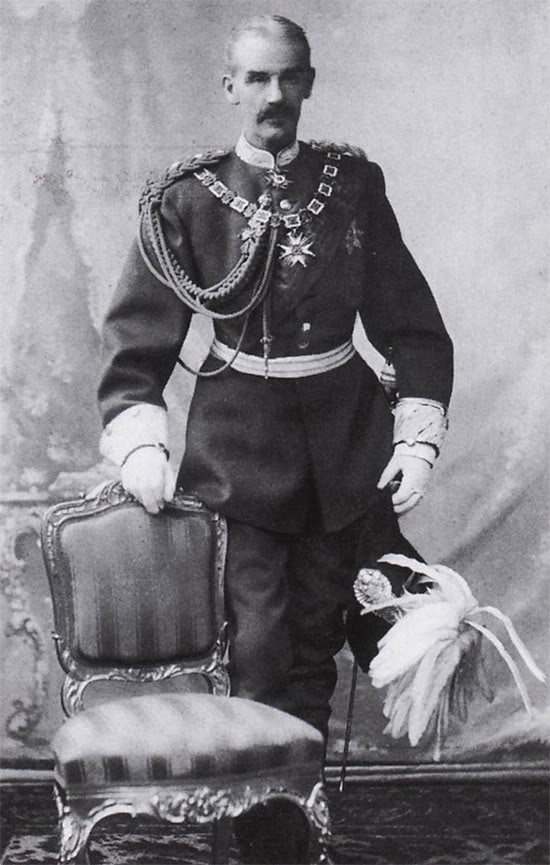
- Photograph c. 1901
- Born: 21 June 1831; Munich, Bavaria
- Died: 6 November 1920 (aged 89); Munich, Weimar Republic
- Burial: Ostfriedhof, Munich
- Spouse: Henriette Mendel, Baroness von Wallersee (m. 1859; died 1891) Antonie Barth, Frau von Bartolf (m. 1892; div. 1913)
- Issue: Countess Marie Larisch von Moennich; Karl Emanuel, Baron von Wallersee
- House: Wittelsbach
- Father: Duke Maximilian Joseph in Bavaria
- Mother: Princess Ludovika of Bavaria

Ludwig Wilhelm (21 June 1831 – 6 November 1920) was a Duke in Bavaria and official head of the ducal branch of the House of Wittelsbach.

== Biography ==
Ludwig Wilhelm (often called Louis) was the eldest child of Duke Maximilian Joseph in Bavaria and Princess Ludovika of Bavaria, and was the brother of Empress Elisabeth of Austria.

He pursued a career in the Royal Bavarian Army, becoming a major in the 1st Royal Bavarian Chevau-légers "Emperor Nicholas of Russia" and rising to the rank of General of the Cavalry by 1859.

== Relationships and issue ==
He renounced his rights as firstborn when he entered into a morganatic marriage to the actress Henriette Mendel, who was created Baroness von Wallersee on their marriage. Louis became father in 1858 of a daughter Marie Louise Mendel, who, as Marie Louise von Larisch-Wallersee ("jene Gräfin Larisch"), was later involved in the Mayerling Incident. In 1859 his son Karl Emanuel was born but died shortly after.

Henriette died on November 12, 1891.

Louis married a second time to ballet prima donna Antonie Barth, on November 19, 1892 in Munich. The duke was forty years older than his bride, and she was not accepted into the duke's family as graciously as his first wife. She was created Frau (Dame or Lady) von Bartolf. In 1906, the duke had declared his intention to marry Fräulein Tordek, a prima donna of the Munich royal opera house. Bartolf left the duke in 1907 after years of physical and emotional abuse. They divorced in July 1913 after Frau von Bartolf gave birth to a daughter, Hélène that the duke claimed was not his child. The daughter of his (former) wife married Prince Friedrich Christian of Schaumburg-Lippe.

== Death ==
In November 1920, Ludwig died of a cardiac arrest-induced stroke and is buried in Munich's Ostfriedhof.

== Honours ==
He received the following orders and decorations:

- Kingdom of Bavaria:
  - Knight of St. Hubert
  - Knight of the Military Merit Order, 2nd Class with Swords
  - Jubilee Medal
  - Army Memorial Cross (1866)
  - Service Award Cross, 2nd Class
- Baden: Knight of the House Order of Fidelity, 1898
- Belgium: Grand Cordon of the Order of Leopold
- Grand Duchy of Hesse: Grand Cross of the Ludwig Order, 1 June 1854
- Austrian Empire:
  - Grand Cross of St. Stephen, 1853
  - Knight of the Golden Fleece, 1854
- Kingdom of Prussia:
  - Knight of the Black Eagle
  - Commemoration Medal of the Silver Wedding of Emperor Wilhelm I and Empress Augusta
- Kingdom of Saxony: Knight of the Rue Crown, 1848
- Two Sicilies: Grand Cross of St. Ferdinand and Merit

== Ancestry ==
Ancestors of Duke Ludwig Wilhelm in Bavaria (1831–1920)

16. John, Count Palatine of Gelnhausen
8. Duke Wilhelm in Bavaria
17. Wild- and Rhinegravine Sophie Charlotte of Salm-Dhaun
4. Duke Pius August in Bavaria
18. Frederick Michael, Count Palatine of Zweibrücken (= 12)
9. Countess Palatine Maria Anna of Zweibrücken-Birkenfeld
19. Countess Palatine Maria Franziska of Sulzbach (= 13)
2. Duke Maximilian Joseph in Bavaria
20. Charles Marie Raymond, Duke of Arenberg
10. Prince Louis of Arenberg
21. Louise Marguerite de La Marck
5. Princess Amélie Louise of Arenberg
22. Marquis Louis Joseph de Mailly-Nesle
11. Marie Adélaïde Julie de Mailly-Nesle
23. Adélaïde Julie d'Hautefort
1. Duke Ludwig Wilhelm in Bavaria
24. Christian III, Count Palatine of Zweibrücken
12. Frederick Michael, Count Palatine of Zweibrücken
25. Countess Caroline of Nassau-Saarbrücken
6. Maximilian I Joseph of Bavaria
26. Joseph Charles, Hereditary Prince of Sulzbach
13. Countess Palatine Maria Franziska of Sulzbach
27. Countess Palatine Elisabeth Auguste Sofie of Neuburg
3. Princess Ludovika of Bavaria
28. Charles Frederick, Grand Duke of Baden
14. Charles Louis, Hereditary Prince of Baden
29. Princess Caroline Louise of Hesse-Darmstadt
7. Princess Caroline of Baden
30. Louis IX, Landgrave of Hesse-Darmstadt
15. Princess Amalie of Hesse-Darmstadt
31. Countess Palatine Caroline of Zweibrücken
