= Ostfriedhof =

Ostfriedhof may refer to:

- Ostfriedhof (Cologne), a cemetery in Cologne, Germany
- Ostfriedhof (Munich), a cemetery in Munich, Germany
