= Henriette Mendel =

German actress and noble's wife (1833–1891)

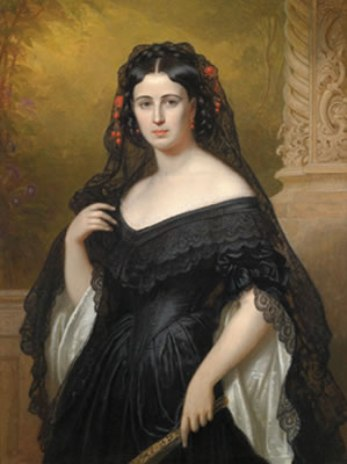
- Henriette Mendel by Friedrich Dürck
- Born: Auguste Henriette Mendel; July 31, 1833; Darmstadt, Hessen-Darmstadt
- Died: November 12, 1891 (aged 58); Munich, Bavaria
- Other names: Henriette Mendel, Baroness von Wallersee
- Occupation: Actress
- Spouse: Ludwig Wilhelm, Duke in Bavaria (m. 1859)
- Children: Countess Marie Larisch von Moennich; Karl Emanuel, Baron von Wallersee
- Parents: Adam Mendel (father); Anna Sophie Müller (mother)

Henriette Mendel, Baroness von Wallersee (July 31, 1833 – November 12, 1891) was a German actress, and the mistress and, later, morganatic wife of Ludwig Wilhelm, Duke in Bavaria. By him, she was the mother of Countess Marie Larisch von Moennich.

== Biography ==
Born Auguste Henriette Mendel in Darmstadt, Hessen-Darmstadt, she was the daughter of Adam Mendel and of Anna Sophie Müller. In English she is usually known as Henrietta Mendel. The family was reportedly Jewish, but since centuries Protestants.

She was an actress at Darmstadt's Großherzoglich Hessisches Hoftheater when she and Ludwig Wilhelm, Duke in Bavaria fell in love. As a Duke in Bavaria (Herzog in Bayern), Ludwig was a high-ranking member of Bavaria's Royal House of Wittelsbach. He was a cousin of Maximilian II of Bavaria (and thus a first cousin once removed of the future king Ludwig II of Bavaria). He was the brother-in-law of Emperor Franz Joseph I of Austria, to whom his younger sister Elisabeth (Sisi) was married.

Henriette and Ludwig had an illegitimate daughter, Marie Louise, born on February 24, 1858. Marie would later become famous under her married name, Countess Marie Larisch von Moennich.

When Henriette became pregnant a second time, a morganatic marriage was arranged. Ludwig renounced succession rights to the Bavarian throne on March 9, 1859. The couple's son Karl Emanuel was born on May 9, 1859, Henriette was created Freifrau von Wallersee on May 19, 1859, and the marriage occurred on May 28, 1859, in Augsburg, Bavaria, at which time her children became Freiin and Freiherr von Wallersee. For the marriage she had to convert to Catholicism.

Karl Emanuel only survived a few months, dying on August 1, 1859. The couple had no more children.

The baroness died November 12, 1891, in Munich, Bavaria of uterine cancer. One year later, her widower, Duke Ludwig, married Barbara Antonie Barth, who had been created Baroness von Bartolf, on November 19, 1892.
