= Countess Marie Larisch von Moennich =

Niece and lady-in-waiting of Empress Elisabeth of Austria

Countess Marie Larisch Countess Georg Larisch of Moennich
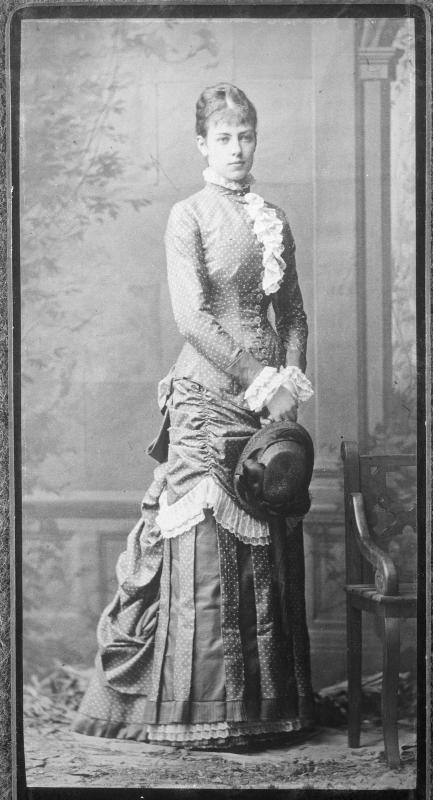
- Portrait by Josef Löwy
- Born: Marie Louise Elizabeth Mendel; 24 February 1858; Augsburg, Bavaria
- Died: 4 July 1940 (aged 82); Augsburg, Bavaria
- Spouses: Count Georg Larisch of Moennich (m. 1877; div. 1896) Otto Brucks (m. 1897; died 1914) William H. Meyers (m. 1924; died 1930)
- Parent(s): Ludwig Wilhelm, Duke in Bavaria; Henriette Mendel, Baroness von Wallersee

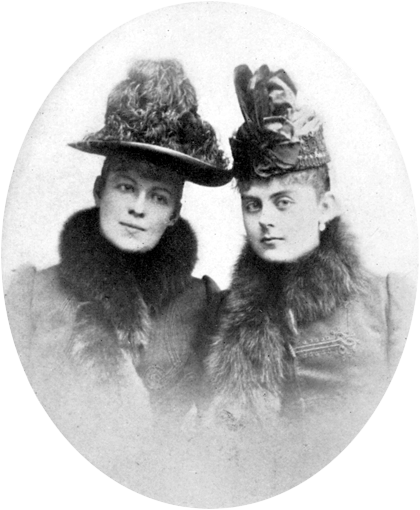
Countess Marie Larisch (L) and Baroness Mary Vetsera (R)

Countess Marie Louise Larisch von Moennich (also known as Countess Marie Louise Larisch-Wallersee and Countess Marie Larisch) (24 February 1858 – 4 July 1940) was a niece of, and lady-in-waiting to, her aunt Empress Elisabeth of Austria, and a morganatic descendant of the Dukes in Bavaria, a collateral branch of the House of Wittelsbach. She was implicated in the Mayerling Incident which resulted in the death of her married cousin Crown Prince Rudolf and his mistress Baroness Mary Vetsera, who was also her friend. She published several books with a ghostwriter about the Imperial household.

== Early life ==
The Countess was born Marie Louise Elizabeth Mendel on 24 February 1858 in Augsburg, Bavaria, the illegitimate daughter of Duke Ludwig Wilhelm in Bavaria (1831–1920) and an actress, Henriette Mendel (1833–1891). Her father, Ludwig Wilhelm, was the eldest son of Duke Maximilian Joseph in Bavaria and Princess Ludovika of Bavaria and had the title of Duke in Bavaria (German: Herzog in Bayern). He was properly addressed as "His Royal Highness," as a member of the cadet branch of the House of Wittelsbach - the royal house in Bavaria. Ludwig Wilhelm was the first cousin of King Maximilian II of Bavaria and also of Emperor Franz Joseph I of Austria, whose mother, Princess Sophie of Bavaria, was a daughter of King Maximilian I of Bavaria. One of Ludwig Wilhelm's younger sisters, Elisabeth, married Emperor Franz Joseph and another, Maria Sophie, married Francis II of the Two Sicilies just before he became king. Henriette (or Henrietta) Mendel was created Baroness of Wallersee (Freifrau von Wallersee) on 19 May 1859 in preparation for her morganatic marriage with Ludwig Wilhelm on 28 May 1859 in Augsburg. Marie was thus a Baroness of Wallersee (Freiin von Wallersee) at birth. Marie became a lady-in-waiting and confidante of her aunt, Empress Elisabeth of Austria.

== Early adulthood ==
Marie received financial support from her cousin Crown Prince Rudolf. On 30 January 1889, Rudolf shot his 17-year-old mistress Baroness Mary Vetsera and committed suicide – a scandal known as the Mayerling Incident that destabilised the Habsburg Empire. It was subsequently revealed that Marie Larisch had acted as go-between for Rudolf and Mary Vetsera. Once exposed, she was banished from the court. Moreover, she had used the situation to extort money from Rudolf through Mary. After the incident, she became distanced from Empress Elisabeth and the nobility, and moved to Bavaria.

== Writer ==
From 1898, Marie began to write about her experiences with the Empress and other Imperial and Royal relatives. The Imperial house paid her "hush money" not to publish her memoirs. However, in 1913, she published her memoirs, My Past, despite her contract with the Imperial house. She later published a series of other ghost-written works.

== World War I and its aftermath ==
During World War I she worked at the front as a nurse. In 1921, she portrayed herself in a silent film, Kaiserin Elisabeth von Österreich, about Empress Elisabeth that she co-authored.

== Personal life ==
On 20 October 1877, at Jagdschloß Gödöllő in Hungary, she married Count Georg Larisch von Moennich, Baron of Ellgoth and Karwin (1855–1928), second child and the only son of Count Leo Larisch von Mönnich (1824–1872) and his Romanian wife, Princess Elena Stirbey (1831–1864). The marriage had been arranged by the Empress. They had 5 children:

- Count Franz Joseph Larisch von Möennich (1878–1937); married to Maria Satterfield (1879–1947) and had issue
- Countess Marie Valerie Larisch von Möennich (1879–1907)
- Countess Marie Henriette Larisch von Möennich (1884–1907); her biological father was Heinrich Baltazzi (1858–1929)
- Count Heinrich Georg Larisch von Möennich (1886–1909); his biological father was also Heinrich Baltazzi (1858–1929)
- Count Friedrich Karl Larisch von Möennich (1894–1929); his biological father was Karl Ernst von Otto-Kreckwitz (1861–1938)

After divorcing Count Larisch on 3 December 1896, she married musician Otto Brucks (1854–1914) in Munich on 15 May 1897. They had one child, Otto (1899–1977). Her second husband's career foundered due to his association with "that Countess Larisch" and his dependency on alcohol. In 1906, her second husband became director of the theatre of Metz. He died in 1914.

On 2 September 1924, she married for the third time naturopath William H. Meyers (1859–1930) in Elizabeth, New Jersey and they lived in Florida. In 1924, an article was published in New York claiming that she would marry anybody who would pay her and her son the fare to America. In 1926, she went to New Jersey to work as a housemaid. She returned to Germany in 1929.

== Death ==
Marie died in 1940 in a nursing home at Augsburg and was buried in the Ostfriedhof in Munich.

== Works ==
- 1913: My Past
- 1934: Secrets of a Royal House
- 1936: My Royal Relatives. In this work she claims to have been the daughter of Marie, Queen of the Two Sicilies by "Count Armand de Lavaÿss"

== Legacy ==
Marie met and conversed with the poet T. S. Eliot, and part of their conversation found its way into his epochal poem The Waste Land.

And when we were children, staying at the archduke's,
My cousin's, he took me out on a sled,
And I was frightened. He said, Marie,
Marie, hold on tight. And down we went.
In the mountains, there you feel free.
I read, much of the night, and go south in the winter.
