= Hans Steyrer =

German restaurateur and strongman

- Born: 1849; Allach, Germany
- Died: 25 August 1906 (aged 56–57); Munich, Germany
- Occupations: Butcher, Innkeeper, Strongman
- Known for: "Bavarian Hercules"

Hans Steyrer (1849 in Allach – 25 August 1906 in Munich) was a German butcher and innkeeper who became a strongman known as the "Bavarian Hercules."

Performing around Europe, Steyrer would dead lift a 200 kilograms (440 lb) stone from the floor with his middle finger.

As an innkeeper, Steyrer was involved in the development and expansion of the Munich Oktoberfest in the late nineteenth century. He is credited with initiating the tradition of the "entry of the innkeepers" on the first day of Oktoberfest. In 1887, Steyrer's private procession of eight carriages carrying his family, workers, and beer was broken up by the police and he was fined 100 marks. Undeterred, Steyrer organized a similar procession the next year. Other innkeepers eventually joined in and their parade is now a feature of the first day of Oktoberfest in Munich.

Steyrer died in Munich on 25 August 1906 and is buried in the Ostfriedhof.

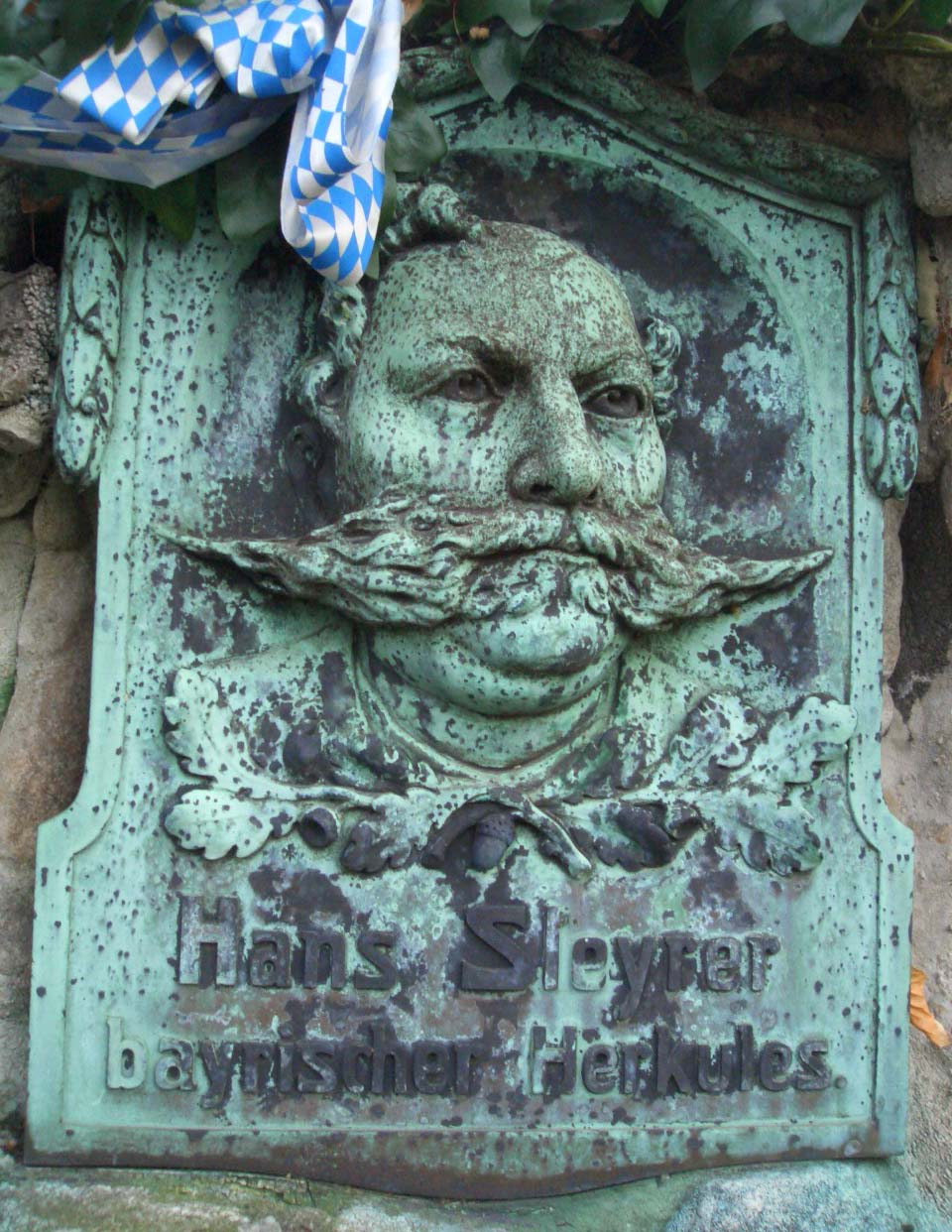
Hans Steyrer's tombstone in the Ostfriedhof
