= Princess Amélie Louise of Arenberg =

- Duchess in Bavaria
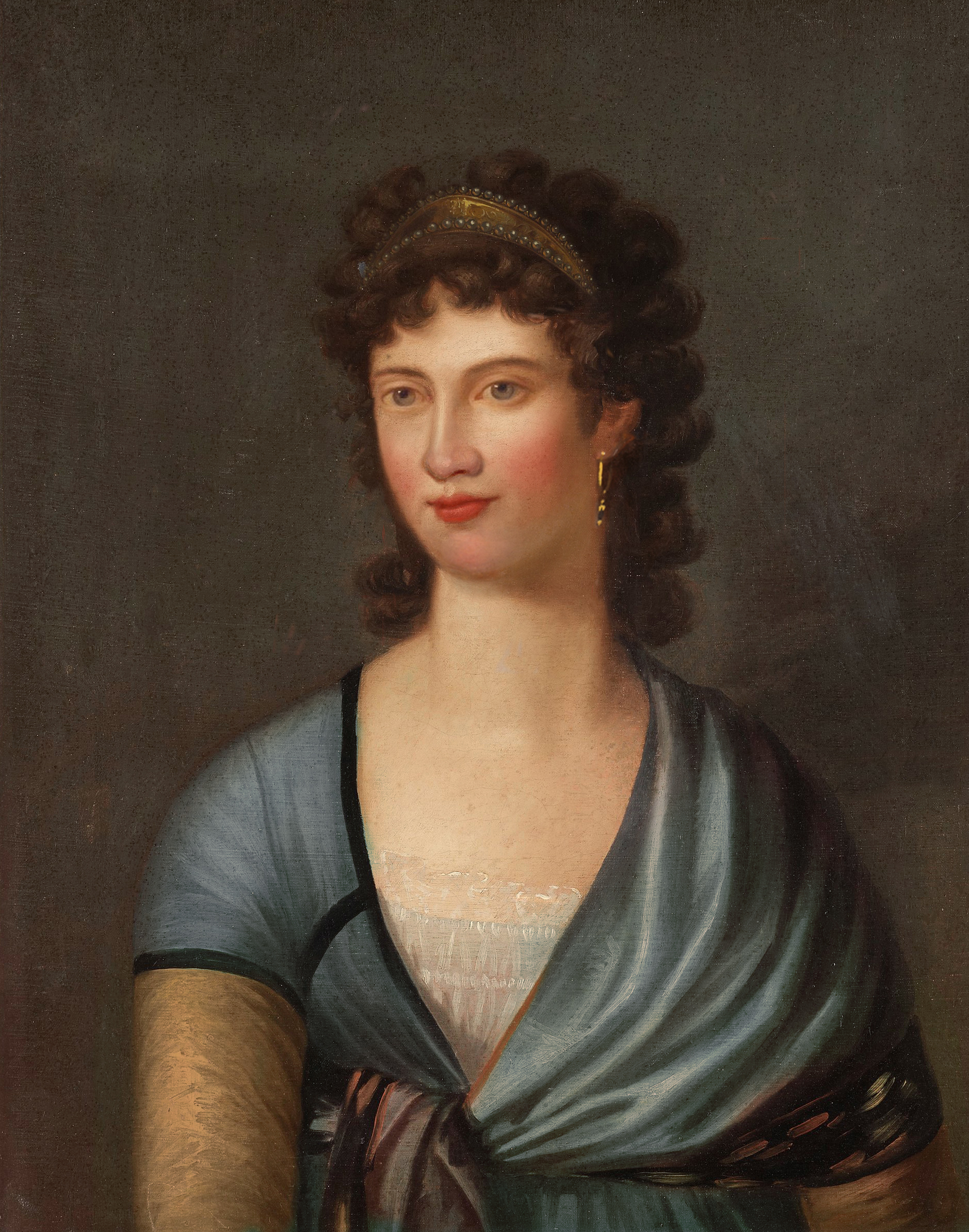
- Born: 10 April 1789; Brussels, Austrian Netherlands
- Died: 4 April 1823 (aged 33); Bamberg, Kingdom of Bavaria
- Burial: Tegernsee Abbey
- Spouse: Duke Pius August in Bavaria (m. 1807)
- Issue: Duke Maximilian Joseph
Names
- French: Amélie-Louise Julie
- House: Arenberg
- Father: Prince Louis of Arenberg
- Mother: Marie de Mailly-Nesle, Dame d'Ivry-sur-Seine

Princess Amélie Louise Julie of Arenberg (German: Amalie Luise Julie; 10 April 1789 – 4 April 1823) was a member of the House of Arenberg by birth and, through her marriage to Duke Pius August in Bavaria, a member of the Palatinate-Birkenfeld-Gelnhausen line of the House of Wittelsbach. Amélie Louise was the paternal grandmother of Empress Elisabeth of Austria through her son Duke Maximilian Joseph in Bavaria.

== Early life ==
Born in Brussels, Austrian Netherlands, Amélie Louise Julie was the only daughter of Prince Louis Marie Eugène of Arenberg and his first wife, Marie Adélaïde Julie de Mailly-Nesle, Dame d'Ivry-sur-Seine. She had a half-sister, Princess Catherine Marie Louise Francoise of Arenberg, from her father's second marriage to Princess Elisabeth Shakhovskoy, member of the Russian nobility. Amélie paternal grandparents were Charles Marie Raymond, 5th Duke of Arenberg and his wife, Countess Louise Margarethe von der Marck-Schleiden. Her maternal grandparents were Louis Joseph de Mailly-Nesle, Prince d'Orange and Neuchâtel and his wife, Adélaide Julie de Hautefort, Mademoiselle de Montignac. The notorious Mailly-Nesle sisters, Pauline Félicité, Louise Julie and Diane Adélaïde, mistresses of King Louis XV were among her mother's cousins.

== Marriage and issue ==
Amélie Louise married Duke Pius August in Bavaria, son of Duke Wilhelm in Bavaria and his wife Countess Palatine Maria Anna of Zweibrücken-Birkenfeld, on 26 May 1807 in Brussels. Pius August and Amélie Louise had one son:

- Duke Maximilian Joseph in Bavaria (4 December 1808 – 15 November 1888)

After their marriage, the couple moved to Bamberg and their son Maximilian Joseph was born the following year. In 1817, Amélie Louise sent her only son to reside with his great uncle Maximilian I Joseph of Bavaria, where he studied at the Royal Institute of Education. Amélie Louise did not see him until 1820. Shortly after returning from her second visit to Munich, Amélie Louise died in 1823 in Bamberg. She was interred in the burial crypt of Tegernsee Abbey.

== Ancestry ==
Ancestors of Princess Amélie Louise of Arenberg

8. Léopold Philippe, 4th Duke of Arenberg
4. Charles, 5th Duke of Arenberg
9. Maria Francesca Pignatelli dei Duchi di Bisaccia
2. Prince Louis Marie Eugène of Arenberg
10. Louis, Duc de La Marck
5. Louise, Countess de La Mark-Schleiden
11. Marie Anne de Visdelou, Comtesse de Bienassis
1. Princess Amélie Louise of Arenberg
12. Louis, Comte de Mailly-Rubempré
6. Louis Joseph, Marquis de Mailly-Nesle
13. Anne Arbaleste, vicomtesse de Melun
3. Marie de Mailly, dame d'Ivry-sur-Seine
14. Emmanuel Dieudonné, marquis de Hautefort
7. Adélaïde Juliette de Hautefort
15. Françoise Claire d'Harcourt
