= David Satterfield =

David Satterfield may refer to:

- David M. Satterfield (born 1954), American diplomat
- Dave E. Satterfield Jr. (1894–1946), U.S. Representative, 1937–1945
- David E. Satterfield III (1920–1988), U.S. Representative, 1965–1981

== See also ==
- Satterfield
