= Morganatic marriage =

Type of marriage between people of unequal social rank

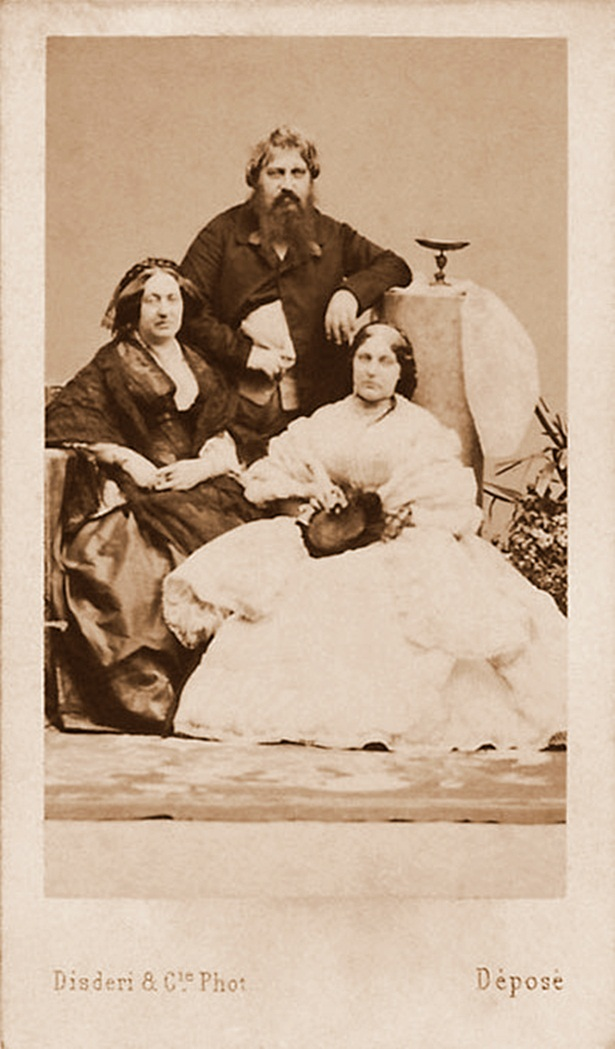
Charles Ferdinand, Prince of Capua (top), with his morganatic wife, the Anglo-Irish commoner Penelope Smyth (left), and their daughter, Vittoria (right).

Morganatic marriage, sometimes called a left-handed marriage, is a marriage between people of unequal social rank, which in the context of royalty or other inherited title prevents the principal's position or privileges being passed to the spouse or to any children born of the marriage. The concept is most prevalent in German-speaking territories and countries most influenced by the customs of the German-speaking realms.

Generally, this is a marriage between a man of high birth (such as from a reigning, deposed or mediatised dynasty) and a woman of lesser status (such as a daughter of a low-ranked noble family or a commoner). Usually, neither the bride nor any children of the marriage have a claim on the husband's succession rights, titles, precedence, or entailed property. The children are considered legitimate for all other purposes and the prohibition against bigamy applies. In some countries, a woman could also marry a man of lower rank morganatically.

== Etymology ==
Morganatic, already in use in English by 1727 (according to the Oxford English Dictionary), is derived from the medieval Latin morganaticus from the Late Latin phrase matrimonium ad morganaticam and refers to the gift given by the groom to the bride on the morning after the wedding, the morning gift, i.e., dower. The Latin term, applied to a Germanic custom, was adopted from the Old High German term *morgangeba (modern German Morgengabe), corresponding to Early English morgengifu. The literal meaning is explained in a 16th-century passage quoted by Du Cange as, "a marriage by which the wife and the children that may be born are entitled to no share in the husband's possessions beyond the 'morning-gift'".

The morning gift has been a customary property arrangement for marriage found first in early medieval Germanic cultures (such as the Lombards) and also among ancient Germanic tribes, and the church drove its adoption into other countries in order to improve the wife's security by this additional benefit. The bride received property from the bridegroom's clan. It was intended to ensure her livelihood in widowhood, and it was to be kept separate as the wife's discrete possession. However, when a marriage contract is made wherein the bride and the children of the marriage will not receive anything else (other than the dower) from the bridegroom or from his inheritance or clan, that sort of marriage was dubbed as "marriage with only the dower and no other inheritance", i.e., matrimonium morganaticum.

== History ==
=== Denmark ===
Succession to the Danish throne followed the specifications of the King's Law until the Danish Act of Succession was passed in 1953. Prominent morganatic marriages include the 1615 marriage of King Christian IV of Denmark to noblewoman Kirsten Munk. Kirsten was titled "Countess of Schleswig-Holstein" and bore the King 12 children, all styled "Count/Countess of Schleswig-Holstein". King Frederick VII married the ballerina Louise Rasmussen, who was raised to the rank of "Countess Danner" in 1850. There were no children of this marriage. When Christian IX's brother, Prince Julius of Schleswig-Holstein-Sonderburg-Glucksburg married Elisabeth von Ziegesar in 1883, the king granted her the title "Countess of Røst".

Until 1971, Danish princes who married women who did not belong to a royal or noble family were refused the sovereign's authorization, renouncing their right of succession to the throne and royal title (Prince Aage of Denmark morganatically eloped with Matilda Calvi, daughter of Count Carlo Giorgio di Bergolo, in January 1914 but renounced his dynastic rights and titles subsequently). They were granted the non-royal prefix of "Prince" and their descendants bear the title Count af Rosenborg in the Danish nobility.

Neither of the sons of Queen Margrethe II has married a person of either royal birth or of the titled aristocracy, but they have maintained their places in the royal lineage, with Frederik X becoming king after his mother's abdication. His younger brother, Prince Joachim of Denmark, is fifth in the line of succession to the Danish throne, following the four children of his elder brother King Frederik X. Members of the Royal Family may still lose their place in the line of succession for themselves and their descendants if they marry without the monarch's permission.

=== France ===
Morganatic marriage was not recognized as a concept in French law. Since the law did not distinguish, for marital purposes, between ruler and subjects, marriages between royalty and the noble heiresses to great fiefs became the norm from no later than the 12th century through the 16th century. The practice of marrying non-royal noble heiresses helped to aggrandize the royal demesne and the House of Capet while gradually diminishing the number of large domains held in theoretical vassalage by nobles who were, in practice, virtually independent of the French crown. The last of these marriages, of Catherine de' Medici to the future King Henry II in 1533, brought the last of these lands, the county of Auvergne, to the crown of France.

Antiquity of nobility in the legitimate male line, not noble quarterings, was the main criterion of rank in the ancien régime. Unlike the status of a British peer's wife and descendants (yet typical of the nobility of every continental European country), the legitimate children and male-line descendants of any French nobleman (whether titled or not, whether possessing a French peerage or not) were also legally noble ad infinitum. Rank was not based on hereditary titles, which were often assumed or acquired by purchase of a noble estate rather than granted by the Crown. Rather, the main determinant of relative rank among the French nobility was how far back the nobility of a family's male line could be verifiably traced. Other factors influencing rank included the family's history of military command, high-ranking offices held at court and marriages into other high-ranking families. A specific exception was made for bearers of the title of duke who, regardless of their origin, outranked all other nobles. But the ducal title in post-medieval France (even when embellished with the still higher status of "peer") ranked its holder and his family among France's nobility and not, as in Germany and Scandinavia (and, occasionally, Italy, viz. Savoy, Medici, Este, della Rovere, Farnese and Cybo-Malaspina) among Europe's reigning dynasties which habitually intermarried with one another.

Once the House of Bourbon inherited the throne of France from the House of Valois in 1589, their dynasts married daughters of even the oldest ducal families of France — let alone noblewomen of lower rank — quite rarely (viz., Anne de Montafié in 1601, Charlotte Marguerite de Montmorency in 1609 and, in exile from revolutionary France, Maria Caterina Brignole in 1798). Exceptions were made for equal royal intermarriage with the princes étrangers and, by royal command, with the so-called princes légitimés (i.e., out-of-wedlock but legitimised descendants of Henry IV and Louis XIV), as well as with the nieces of Cardinal-prime ministers (i.e., Richelieu, Mazarin). Just as the French king could authorize a royal marriage that would otherwise have been deemed unsuitable, by 1635 it had been established by Louis XIII that the king could also legally void the canonically valid, equal marriage of a French dynast to which he had not given consent (e.g., Marguerite of Lorraine, Duchess of Orléans).

Moreover, there was a French practice, legally distinct from morganatic marriage but used in similar situations of inequality in status between a member of the royal family and a spouse of lower rank: an "openly secret" marriage. French kings authorized such marriages only when the bride was past child-bearing or the marrying prince already had dynastic heirs by a previous spouse of royal descent. The marriage ceremony took place without banns, in private (with only a priest, the bride and groom, and a few legal witnesses present), and the marriage was never officially acknowledged (although sometimes widely known). Thus, the wife never publicly shared in her husband's titles, rank, or coat of arms. The lower-ranked spouse, male or female, could only receive from the royal spouse what property the king allowed.

In secret marriage, Louis XIV wed his second wife, Madame de Maintenon, in 1683 (she was nearly 50, so no children were likely); Louis the Grand Dauphin wed Marie Émilie de Joly de Choin in 1695; Anne Marie d'Orléans (La Grande Mademoiselle) wed Antoine, Duke de Lauzun in 1682; and Louis Philippe I, Duke of Orléans wed the Marquise de Montesson in 1773. The mechanism of the "secret marriage" rendered it unnecessary for France to legislate the morganatic marriage per se. Within post-monarchical dynasties, until the end of the 20th century the heads of the Spanish and Italian Bourbon branches, the Orléans of both France and Brazil, and the Imperial Bonapartes have, in exile, exercised claimed authority to exclude from their dynasty descendants born of unapproved marriages — albeit without calling these marriages "morganatic".

=== German-speaking Europe ===
The practice of morganatic marriage was most common in the German-speaking parts of Europe, where equality of birth (Ebenbürtigkeit) between the spouses was considered an important principle among the reigning houses and high nobility. The German name was Ehe zur linken Hand ("marriage by the left hand") and the husband gave his left hand during the wedding ceremony instead of the right.

Perhaps the most famous example in modern times was the 1900 marriage of the heir to the throne of Austria-Hungary, Archduke Franz Ferdinand, and Bohemian aristocrat Countess Sophie Chotek von Chotkowa. The marriage was initially resisted by Emperor Franz Joseph I, but after pressure from family members and other European rulers, he relented in 1899 (but did not attend the wedding himself). The bride was made Princess (later Duchess) of Hohenberg, their children took their mother's new name and rank, but were excluded from the imperial succession. The Sarajevo assassination in 1914, killing both the Archduke Franz Ferdinand and his wife Sophie, triggered the First World War.

Although the issue of morganatic marriages were ineligible to succeed to their families' respective thrones, children of morganatic marriages have gone on to achieve dynastic success elsewhere in Europe. Descendants of the 1851 marriage of Prince Alexander of Hesse and by Rhine to the German-Polish noblewoman Countess Julia von Hauke (created Princess of Battenberg) include Alexander, sovereign prince of Bulgaria, queen-consorts of Spain (Victoria Eugenie of Battenberg) and of Sweden (Louise Mountbatten), and, in the female line, Charles III (through his paternal grandmother, Alice of Battenberg).

Likewise, from the morganatic marriage of Duke Alexander of Württemberg and Countess Claudine Rhédey de Kis-Rhéde (created Countess von Hohenstein) descends Mary of Teck, who became Britain's queen in 1911 as the consort of King George V.

Occasionally, children of morganatic marriages have overcome their non-dynastic origins and succeeded to their family's realms. Margrave Leopold inherited the throne of Baden, despite being born of a morganatic marriage, after all dynastic males of the House of Zähringen died out. The son of Charles Frederick, Grand Duke of Baden, by his second wife Louise Caroline Geyer von Geyersberg, who belonged to the minor nobility, Leopold became a prince in 1817, at the age of 27, as the result of a new law of succession. Baden's grand-ducal family faced extinction, so Leopold was enfranchised by international treaty and married to a princess, ascending the throne in 1830. His descendants ruled the grand duchy until the abolition of the monarchy in 1918.

Other reigning German families adopted similar approaches when facing a lack of male heirs. In 1896 the Princely House of Schwarzburg, with the Sondershausen branch numbering two elderly childless princes and Rudolstadt just one childless prince, recognised Prince Sizzo von Leutenberg, morganatic son of Friedrich Günther, Prince of Schwarzburg-Rudolstadt, as a Prince of Schwarzburg and heir to the two principalities.

The senior line of the dynasty ruling the Principality of Lippe was bordering on extinction as the 20th century approached, prompting a succession dispute between the Lippe-Biesterfeld and Schaumburg-Lippe branches of the dynasty which evoked international intervention and troop movements. It centered on whether some ancestresses of the Biesterfeld branch had been legally dynastic; if so, that line stood next to inherit the princely crown according to primogeniture. If not, the Biesterfelds would be deemed morganatic and the Schaumburg-Lippes would inherit the throne. Lippe's Parliament was blocked from voting on the matter by the German Empire's Reichstag, which instead created a panel of jurists selected by the King of Saxony to evaluate the evidence concerning the historical marital rules of the House of Lippe and render a decision in the matter, all parties agreeing to abide by their judgment. In 1897 and 1905 panels ruled in favour of the dynasticity of the challenged ancestresses and their descendants, largely because, although neither had been of dynastic rank, the Lippes had historically accepted such marriages for the junior lines when approved by the Head of House.

In the late 19th and early 20th centuries, a few families considered in Germany to be morganatic were considered for crowns elsewhere, constituting unexpected rehabilitation of their status. The first of these was Prince Alexander of Battenberg, who in 1877 was agreed upon by the Great Powers as the best candidate for the new throne of Bulgaria. He was, however, unable to hold onto his crown, and was also unable to obtain the hand in marriage of Princess Viktoria of Prussia despite the efforts of her imperial mother and grandmother.

Wilhelm, Duke of Urach (1864–1928), whose father was the morganatic son of a Württemberg prince, had the distinction of being under consideration for the crowns of five realms at different times: the Kingdom of Württemberg in the 1890s, as the senior agnate by primogeniture when it became likely that King William II would die without male descendants, leaving as heir Duke Albrecht of Württemberg, a more distantly related, albeit dynastic, royal kinsman; the Principality of Albania in 1913; the Principality of Monaco at turn of the 20th century, as the next heir by proximity of blood following the Hereditary Prince Louis, until the Monaco succession crisis of 1918 was resolved as the First World War ended; the prospective Grand Duchy of Alsace-Lorraine in 1917; and his abortive election by the Taryba as King Mindaugas II of Lithuania in July 1918. In the event, Duke Wilhelm was offered none of these thrones.

Relying upon the Almanach de Gotha to gazette dynastic events, Germany's deposed heads of state continued to notify its editors of changes in family members' status and traditional titles. In 1919 the morganatic wife and children of Prince Oskar of Prussia, the counts and countesses von Ruppin, were upgraded to princes and princesses of Prussia by the exiled Kaiser Wilhelm II. In 1928 Georg, Count von Carlow, morganatic son of Duke George Alexander of Mecklenburg and commoner Natalia Vanljarskaya, became a duke of Mecklenburg and heir to his uncle Duke Charles Michael. In 1949, and again in 1999, various morganatic members of the Bavarian Royal House were recognised as princes and princesses of Bavaria, with the current head of the house, Franz von Bayern, being among the beneficiaries of his father's ruling, having been born of a marriage initially deemed morganatic.

In the former royal family of Saxony Maria Emanuel, Margrave of Meissen adopted and designated as his heir his nephew Alexander Afif, thus bypassing his agnatic cousin's morganatic son, Rüdiger von Sachsen, and his three sons.

After World War I, the heads of both ruling and formerly reigning German dynasties initially continued the practice of rejecting dynastic titles and/or rights for descendants of "morganatic" unions, but gradually allowed them, sometimes retroactively, effectively de-morganatizing the wives and children. This was accommodated by Perthes' Almanach de Gotha (which categorised German princely families by rank until it ceased publication after 1944) by inserting the offspring of such marriages in a third section of the almanac under entries denoted by a symbol (a dot within a circle) that "signifies some princely houses which, possessing no specific princely patent, have passed from the first part, A, or from the second part into the third part in virtue of special agreements". The Fürstliche Häuser ("Princely Houses") series of the Genealogisches Handbuch des Adels ("Genealogical Manual of the Nobility") has followed this lead, likewise enrolling some issue of unapproved marriages in its third section, "III B", with a similar explanation: "Families in this section, although verified, received no specific decree, but have been included by special agreement in the 1st and 2nd sections".

=== Luxembourg ===
When the Grand Duchy of Luxembourg found itself without a male heir at the beginning of the 20th century, the morganatic counts von Merenberg proposed themselves as heirs, being the last legitimate descendants in the male line of the House of Nassau. Grand Duke William IV, however, chose to confirm the law of succession stipulated in 1815 by the Congress of Vienna to allow a female descendant in the Nassau male line to become successor to the throne (his own daughter Marie-Adélaïde) instead.

In 2006, Prince Louis, the third child of then-reigning Grand Duke Henri, married Tessy Antony, an ordinary citizen. Prince Louis was required to renounce his succession rights and those of the couple's children.

=== Russia ===
Paul I of Russia promulgated a strict new house law for Russia in 1797, eliminating the sovereign's right to designate the heir to the throne, but requiring that dynasts be born of authorized marriages. In 1820 a new law also stipulated that only children of Romanovs born of marriages with persons of equal status, i.e., members of a "royal or sovereign family", could transmit succession rights and titles to descendants. Alexander III forbade Romanov morganatic marriages altogether by issuance of ukase #5868 on 24 March 1889 amending article #63 of the Statute on the Imperial Family in the Pauline laws. By ukase #35731, dated 11 August 1911, Nicholas II amended the amendment, reducing application of this restriction from all members of the Imperial Family to grand dukes and grand duchesses only. This decree allowed marriages of the princes and princesses of the Blood Imperial with non-royal spouses, on the conditions that the emperor's consent be obtained, that the dynast renounce his or her personal succession rights, and that the Pauline laws restricting succession rights to those born of equal marriages continue in force.

An early victim of the Pauline laws was Grand Duke Constantine Pavlovich, grandson of Catherine the Great, and viceroy of Poland. On 20 March 1820 his marriage to Princess Juliane of Saxe-Coburg-Saalfeld was annulled to allow him to morganatically wed his longtime mistress, Countess Joanna Grudna-Grudzińska, in Warsaw on 24 May 1820, who was elevated to the title "Princess Łowicza" upon marriage, which produced no children.

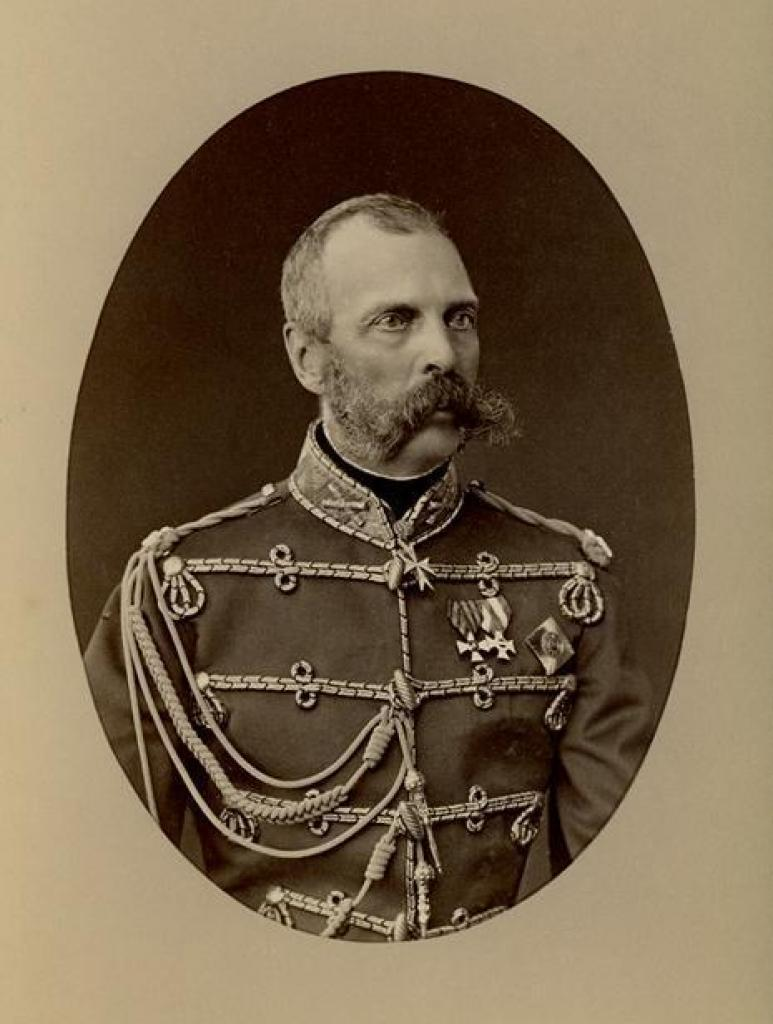
Tsar Alexander II

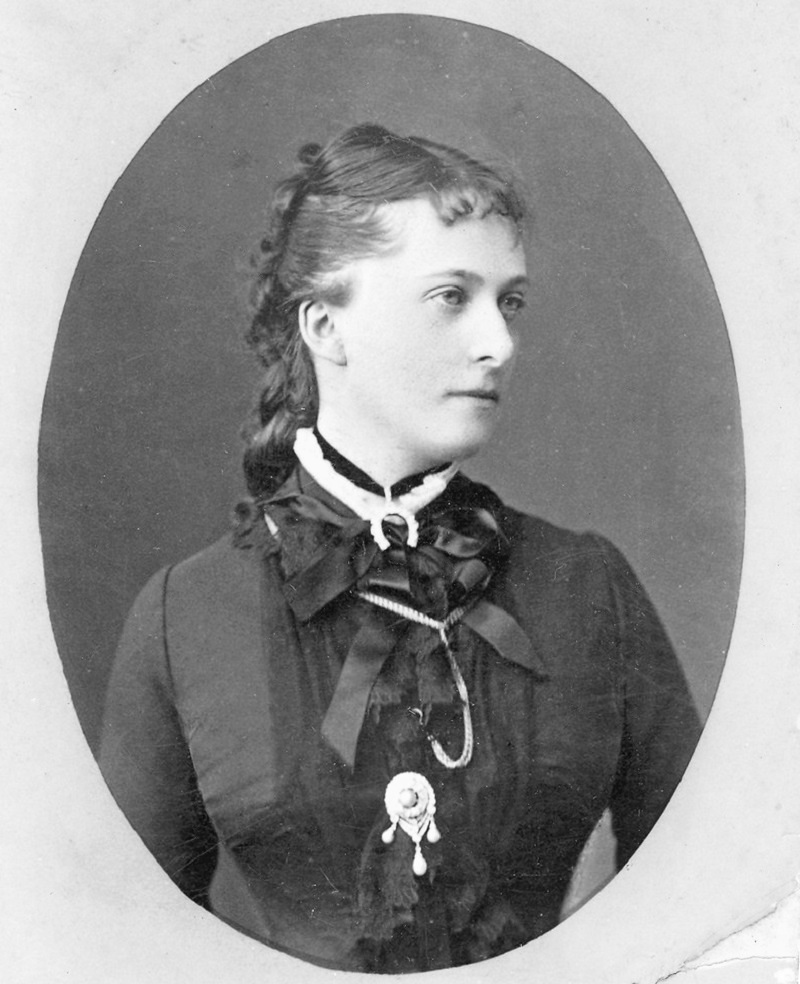
Princess Catherine Dolgorukova

One emperor, Alexander II, married morganatically in 1880. Princess Ekaterina Mihailovna Dolgorukova, Alexander's second bride, had previously been his long-term mistress and the mother of his three legitimised children, the princes and princesses Yurievsky.

Beginning a novel tradition, one of that couple's daughters, Princess Olga Aleksandrovna Yurievskaya (1873–1925), in 1895 married the child of an 1868 morganatic marriage in the House of Nassau, George, Count von Merenberg (1871–1965). His mother was a daughter of renowned author Alexander Pushkin but, despite being of noble birth, she could not in 1868 dynastically marry the younger brother of a then-exiled Duke of Nassau. The count filed a futile suit to establish that his morganatic status in Germany should not exclude him from succession to the throne of Luxembourg after the last male of the House of Orange, King William III of the Netherlands, died in 1890 and it became apparent that the House of Nassau faced the imminent extinction of its male members, as well, upon the eventual death of William IV, Grand Duke of Luxembourg. Olga's brother, Prince George Aleksandrovich Yurievsky (1872–1913), in 1900 wed Countess Alexandra von Zarnekau (1883–1957), daughter of the morganatic marriage of the Russo-German Duke Constantine Petrovich of Oldenburg with Agrafena Djaparidize. Merenberg's sister, Sophia (1868–1927), likewise contracted a morganatic marriage in 1891, with Grand Duke Michael Mikhailovich of Russia, whose cousin, Emperor Nicholas II banished them to England, unwittingly saving the couple from the maelstrom of the Russian Revolution which proved fatal to so many Romanovs. She and her children were made counts de Torby, her younger daughter, Countess Nada (1896–1963) marrying, in 1916 Prince George of Battenberg, future Marquess of Milford Haven and scion of the House of Battenberg, a morganatic branch of the grandducal House of Hesse which had settled in England and inter-married with descendants of Queen Victoria.

Less fortunate among the Romanovs was Grand Duke Paul Aleksandrovich, who went into exile in Paris to marry a commoner, Olga Valerianovna Karnovich in 1902. Paul returned to serve in the Russian army during the First World War, and Nicholas II rewarded his uncle's loyalty by elevating Olga and her children as Princess and Princes Paley in 1915. Paul's patriotism, however, sealed his fate, and he died at the hands of Russia's revolutionaries in 1919. One of his daughters, Princess Irene Pavlovna Paley (1903–1990), was married while in exile in 1923, to her cousin, Prince Feodor Aleksandrovich of Russia, (1898-1968).

Nicholas II forbade his brother, Grand Duke Michael Alexandrovich of Russia, from marrying twice-divorced noblewoman Natalya Sergeyevna Wulfert (née Sheremetevskaya), but the couple eloped abroad in 1911. The Tsar refused his brother's request to grant the bride or their son, George Mikhailovich (1910–1931) a title, but legitimated George and incorporated him into the Russian nobility under the surname "Brassov" in 1915: nonetheless he and his mother used the comital title from 1915, only being granted a princely prefix in exile by Cyril Vladimirovich, Grand Duke of Russia in 1928. In the throes of the First World War, Nicholas II allowed his sister Grand Duchess Olga Alexandrovna of Russia to end her loveless marriage to her social equal, Duke Peter Alexandrovich of Oldenburg, and quietly marry commoner Colonel Nikolai Alexandrovich Kulikovsky. Both Michael's and Olga's descendants from these marriages were excluded from the succession.

After the murder of Nicholas II and his children, the Imperial Family's morganatic marriages restricted the number of possible claimants. Grand Duke Cyril Vladimirovich, Nicholas's cousin, proclaimed himself as Emperor in exile. Controversy accompanied the marriage of his son Grand Duke Vladimir Cyrillovich to Princess Leonida Georgievna Bagration-Mukhransky, a descendant of the deposed Royal House of Georgia. After the annexation of Georgia in 1801, Leonida's family were deemed ordinary nobility in Imperial Russia rather than royalty, leading to claims that her 1948 marriage to Vladimir (who, however, also belonged to a deposed dynasty by then) was unequal and should be considered morganatic. As a result, some factions within Russia's monarchist movement did not support the couple's daughter, Grand Duchess Maria Vladimirovna, as the rightful heir to the Romanov dynasty.

=== Sweden ===
The concept of morganatic marriages was never established under Swedish law. The 1810 Act of Succession did, until late 20th century, prohibit princes of the royal house from entering unequal marriages with enskild mans dotter (daughter of a private man);i.e. excluding those not belonging to a reigning or mediatised royal house. Those princes that did so anyway lost all rights of succession to the throne themselves, and were no longer considered dynastic members of the royal house; their marriages were never considered morganatic but simply unequal.

=== Transkei ===
Standards of social classification and marital rules resembling the traditions of dynastic Europe can also be found in a number of sovereign nations in Africa. Here, a number of its peoples have legalized traditional authority as manifested in the recognized hereditary transmission of chieftaincy in historically relevant regions of the continent (e.g., the Asantehene of Ghana).

An example of the form that morganatic unions tend to take amongst African royalty can be found in the biography of Nelson Mandela, the late leader of South Africa. Mandela, a nobleman by birth of the Xhosa Thembus that reside in the Transkei region of the Cape coast, was nevertheless unable to ascend the throne of the Kumkani (or king) of the entire Thembu tribe, even though he descended in the legitimate, male line from the holders of this title. Nearly two centuries ago, Ngubengcuka (d. 1832), who ruled as the Kumkani of the Thembu people, married and subsequently left a son named Mandela, who became Nelson's grandfather and the source of his surname. However, because Mandela was only the Inkosi's child by a wife of the Ixhiba lineage, a so-called "Left-Hand House", the descendants of his cadet branch of the Thembu royal family remain ineligible to succeed to the Thembu throne, which is itself one of the several traditional seats that are still officially recognized by South Africa's government. Instead, the Mandelas were given the chiefdom of Mvezo and made hereditary counsellors to the Kumkani (i.e., privy counsellors) in deference to their royal ancestry. Following the loss of this chiefdom (which has since been restored to the family) in the Apartheid era, the Mandelas retained their positions as nobles of the Transkei. This status entailed, however, a degree of subjugation to the head of the dynasty, in particular in the matter of marital selection, which proved so onerous an issue to Nelson Mandela that it prompted the departure to Johannesburg that eventually led to his political career. Like the House of Battenberg in Europe, Mandela's family has since rehabilitated its dynastic status to some extent: Mandela was still in prison when his daughter Zenani was married to Prince Thumbumuzi Dlamini in 1973, elder brother of both King Mswati III of Swaziland and Queen Mantfombi, Great Wife of Goodwill Zwelithini, King of the Zulus.

=== Travancore and Cochin ===
In the erstwhile princely state of Travancore, in India, the male members of the Travancore Royal Family were, under the existing matrilineal Marumakkathayam system of inheritance and family, permitted to contract marriages with women of the Nair caste which is Kshatriya but not royal crown title. These were marriages called Pattum Parivattavum wherein the children gained their mother's caste and family name, due to Marumakkathayam. Although they could not inherit the throne, they did receive a title of nobility, Thampi (son of the Maharajah) and Kochamma (daughter of the Maharajah). These were the members of the Ammaveedus and their titles ensured a comfortable lifestyle and all other luxuries. The descendants of these Ammaveedu members were simply called Thampi and Thankachi and they didn't get any other distinguishing privileges.The same way the queen husband from the Kshatriya royal families also doesn't get any privileges or titles as follwed marumakattaym or matrilineal inheritance, their childrens followers mothers title and family name

The Cochin Royal family also followed the system of Marumakkatayam. Traditionally the female members of the family married Namboodiri Brahmins while male members marry ladies of the Nair caste. These wives of the male members are not royalty or didn't receive any royal titles or power, per the matrilineal system but instead get the title of Nethyar Amma. Their position ceases when the Maharaja dies. The children born to Neytharammas will be known by their mother's caste and hold no key royal titles. Currently the family marries mostly within the Kerala Kshatriya class.

=== United Kingdom ===
The concept of morganatic marriage has never clearly existed in any part of the United Kingdom, and historically the English crown descended through marriages with commoners as late as the 17th century. Only two of the six marriages Henry VIII made to secure an heir were with royal brides, and Elizabeth Woodville, queen of Edward IV of England, was also a commoner.

Another link in the English succession involving marriage with a commoner was between John of Gaunt and Katherine Swynford. When they married after co-habiting for several years all children born previously were subsequently legitimated by Act of Parliament, this marriage was important, as King Henry VII was descended from it.

The marriage in 1785 of George IV when he was Prince of Wales to Maria Fitzherbert has been claimed as being morganatic: it was instead unlawful, as it was a marriage which had not been sanctioned by the king, pursuant to the Royal Marriages Act 1772. Another point about it was that as Fitzherbert was a Roman Catholic, if it had been lawful, the provisions about such marriages in the Act of Settlement 1701 would have prevented the Prince of Wales from inheriting the throne. As it was unlawful, it could not.

As in nearly all European monarchies extant in the 21st century, most approved marriages in the British royal family are with untitled commoners and have been for several generations. In 1923, the future George VI (then second in line to the throne as Duke of York), was the first future British monarch to marry a non-princess or prince since 1659 when the future James II of England eloped with Anne Hyde. Wives of British peers are entitled to use the feminine form of their husbands' peerages under English common law, while wives of royal princes share their husbands' styles by custom unless the Sovereign formally objects.

For example, Catherine Middleton, a commoner, became the Duchess of Cambridge upon her marriage on 29 April 2011 to Prince William, who had been created Duke of Cambridge that morning. Camilla Parker Bowles, second wife of Charles, Prince of Wales (as he was at the time), legally held the title "Princess of Wales" but at the time that the engagement was announced it was declared that she would be known by the title "Duchess of Cornwall" and, in Scotland, Duchess of Rothesay (derived from other titles her husband held as heir apparent) in deference, it has been reported, to public feelings about the title's previous holder, the Prince's first wife Lady Diana Spencer. It was simultaneously stated that at such time, if any, her husband acceded to the throne, she would be known as "Princess Consort" rather than "Queen", although as the king's wife she would legally be queen. However, in her 2022 Accession Day message, Queen Elizabeth II stated that it was her "sincere wish" for Camilla to be "known as Queen Consort", and, on Charles' accession, Camilla took this title.

==== Edward VIII and Wallis Simpson ====
On 16 November 1936 Edward VIII informed Prime Minister Stanley Baldwin that he intended to marry the American divorcée Wallis Simpson, proposing that he be allowed to do so morganatically and remain king. Baldwin expressed his belief that Mrs. Simpson would be unacceptable to the British people as queen due to her status as a divorcee, which contradicted Church of England doctrine at the time, but agreed to take further soundings. The prospect of the marriage was rejected by the British Cabinet. The other Dominion governments were consulted pursuant to the Statute of Westminster 1931, which provided in part that "any alteration in the law touching the Succession to the Throne or the Royal Style and Titles shall hereafter require the assent as well of the Parliaments of all the Dominions as of the Parliament of the United Kingdom." Baldwin suggested three options to the prime ministers of the five Dominions of which Edward was also king: Canada, Australia, New Zealand, South Africa and the Irish Free State. The options were:

1. Edward and Mrs. Simpson marry and she become queen (a royal marriage);
2. Edward and Mrs. Simpson marry, but she not become queen, instead receiving some courtesy title (a morganatic marriage); or
3. Abdication for Edward and any potential heirs he might father, allowing him to make any marital decisions without further constitutional implications.

The second option had European precedents, including Edward's own maternal great-grandfather, Duke Alexander of Württemberg, but no unambiguous parallel in British constitutional history. William Lyon Mackenzie King (Prime Minister of Canada), Joseph Lyons (Prime Minister of Australia) and J. B. M. Hertzog (Prime Minister of South Africa) opposed options 1 and 2. Michael Joseph Savage (Prime Minister of New Zealand) rejected option 1 but thought that option 2 "might be possible ... if some solution along these lines were found to be practicable" but "would be guided by the decision of the Home government". Thus the majority of the Commonwealth's prime ministers agreed that there was "no alternative to course (3)". On 24 November, Baldwin consulted the three leading opposition politicians in Britain: Leader of the Opposition Clement Attlee, Liberal leader Sir Archibald Sinclair and Winston Churchill. Sinclair and Attlee agreed that options 1 and 2 were unacceptable and Churchill pledged to support the government.

The letters and diaries of working-class people and ex-servicemen generally demonstrate support for the King, while those from the middle and upper classes tend to express indignation and distaste. The Times, The Morning Post, the Daily Herald, and newspapers owned by Lord Kemsley, such as The Daily Telegraph, opposed the marriage. On the other hand, the Express and Mail newspapers, owned by Lord Beaverbrook and Lord Rothermere, respectively, appeared to support a morganatic marriage. The King estimated that the newspapers in favour had a circulation of 12.5 million, and those against had 8.5 million.

Backed by Churchill and Beaverbrook, Edward proposed to broadcast a speech indicating his desire to remain on the throne or to be recalled to it if forced to abdicate, while marrying Mrs Simpson morganatically. In one section, Edward proposed to say:

Neither Mrs. Simpson nor I have ever sought to insist that she should be queen. All we desired was that our married happiness should carry with it a proper title and dignity for her, befitting my wife. Now that I have at last been able to take you into my confidence, I feel it is best to go away for a while, so that you may reflect calmly and quietly, but without undue delay, on what I have said.

Baldwin and the British Cabinet blocked the speech, saying that it would shock many people and would be a grave breach of constitutional principles.

Ultimately, Edward decided to give up the throne for "the woman I love", whereupon he and his descendants were deprived of all right to the Crown by Parliament's passage of His Majesty's Declaration of Abdication Act 1936. He was created Duke of Windsor on 8 March 1937 by his brother, the new George VI. He would marry Wallis Simpson in France on 3 June 1937, after her second divorce became final. In the meantime, however, letters patent dated 27 May 1937, which re-conferred upon the Duke of Windsor the "title, style, or attribute of Royal Highness", specifically stated that "his wife and descendants, if any, shall not hold said title or attribute". This decree was issued by the new king and unanimously supported by the Dominion governments. The king's authority to withhold from the lawful wife of a prince the attribute hitherto accorded to the wives of other modern British princes was addressed by the Crown's legal authorities: On 14 April 1937, Attorney General Sir Donald Somervell submitted to Home Secretary Sir John Simon a memorandum summarising the views of Lord Advocate T. M. Cooper, Parliamentary Counsel Sir Granville Ram, and himself:

1. We incline to the view that on his abdication the Duke of Windsor could not have claimed the right to be described as a Royal Highness. In other words, no reasonable objection could have been taken if the King had decided that his exclusion from the lineal succession excluded him from the right to this title as conferred by the existing Letters Patent.
2. The question however has to be considered on the basis of the fact that, for reasons which are readily understandable, he with the express approval of His Majesty enjoys this title and has been referred to as a Royal Highness on a formal occasion and in formal documents. In the light of precedent it seems clear that the wife of a Royal Highness enjoys the same title unless some appropriate express step can be and is taken to deprive her of it.
3. We came to the conclusion that the wife could not claim this right on any legal basis. The right to use this style or title, in our view, is within the prerogative of His Majesty and he has the power to regulate it by Letters Patent generally or in particular circumstances.

The new King's firm view, that the Duchess should not be given a royal title, was shared by Queen Mary and George's wife, Queen Elizabeth. The Duchess bitterly resented the denial of the royal title and the refusal of the Duke's relatives to accept her as part of the family. In the early days of George VI's reign the Duke telephoned daily, importuning for money and urging that the Duchess be granted the style of Royal Highness, until the harassed King ordered that the calls not be put through. However, within the household of the Duke and Duchess, the style "Her Royal Highness" was used by those who were close to the couple.

==== Morganatic vs. invalid ====
The Royal Marriages Act 1772 made it illegal for all persons born into the British royal family to marry without the permission of the sovereign, and any marriage contracted without the sovereign's consent was considered invalid. This led to several prominent cases of British princes who had gone through marriage ceremonies, and who cohabited with their partners as if married, but whose relationships were not legally recognised. As a result, their partners and children (which would be considered illegitimate) held no titles, and had no succession rights. This differs from morganatic marriages, which are considered legally valid.

=== England/Scotland ===
==== James II/VII and Anne Hyde ====
It has been suggested that William, Prince of Orange, expected to have a strong claim to the throne of England after the Duke of York during the reign of Charles II. In fact, the Duke's two daughters from his first marriage, Princess Mary and Princess Anne, were considered to have the stronger claim by the English establishment. William's expectation was based on the continental practice of morganatic marriage, since the mother of both princesses, Anne Hyde, was a commoner and a lady-in-waiting to William's mother, Princess Mary. It was through his mother, a sister of Charles II and the Duke of York, that William claimed the throne, because, to his mind, the son of a princess had a stronger claim than the daughter of a commoner. It was to shore up his own claim to the throne that he agreed to marry his first cousin, Princess Mary. When James II fled at the Glorious Revolution, William refused to accept the title of king consort (which Philip II of Spain had been granted under Queen Mary I in the 1550s) and insisted on being named King in his own right. The compromise solution involved naming both to the crown as had rarely happened in the past (see for example King Henry II and his son Henry the Young King, who ruled England simultaneously).

=== Elsewhere ===
Variations of morganatic marriage were also practised by non-European dynasties, such as the Royal Family of Thailand, the polygamous Mongols as to their non-principal wives, and other families of Africa and Asia.

== Examples ==
=== Men ===
- Genghis Khan followed the contemporary tradition by taking several morganatic wives in addition to his principal wife, whose property passed to their youngest son, also following tradition.
- Ludwig Wilhelm, Duke in Bavaria and actress Henriette Mendel. She was created Baroness von Wallersee, and their daughter, Marie Louise, Countess Larisch von Moennich, was a confidante of her aunt Empress Elisabeth ("Sissi") of Austria.
- Archduke Ferdinand II of Austria, ruler of the Tirol, first married Philippine Welser, a bourgeoise of a wealthy family in 1557. Their children were given the title Margrave von Burgau, the issue of Ferdinand's second (and equal) marriage being of archducal rank and preferred for purposes of inheritance.
- Victor Emmanuel II of Italy in 1869 married morganatically his principal mistress Rosa Teresa Vercellana Guerrieri. Popularly known in Piedmontese as "Bela Rosin" (Little Rosa the Beautiful), she was born a commoner but made Countess di Mirafiori e Fontanafredda in 1858.
- Prince Alexander of Hesse and by Rhine in 1851 married morganatically Countess Julia von Hauke. Instead of being part of the House of Hesse-Darmstadt to which their father belonged, their patrilinear descendants were created Princes of Battenberg, whose branch living in the United Kingdom later became House of Mountbatten.
- Late in his life, the widowed ex-king Fernando II of Portugal married the opera singer Elise Hensler, who was created Countess von Edla.
- In 1917, the grandson of Ferdinand II of Portugal, Afonso, Duke of Porto, the last Prince Royal of Portugal, married the twice-divorced American socialite Nevada Stoody Hayes.
- In 1929, Alfonso de Borbón y Borbón, a Spanish prince, married Julia Méndez y Morales, thereby losing all claims to the Spanish throne.
- A list of morganatic branches of the Russian Imperial Family
- The 1900 marriage of Archduke Franz Ferdinand of Austria, whose subsequent assassination triggered World War I, to Countess Sophie Chotek von Wognin was morganatic at the insistence of the Austrian Emperor Franz Joseph I.
- Danish astronomer and nobleman Tycho Brahe married Kirsten Jørgensdatter morganatically in 1572. He was allowed to do so because he was close friends with King Frederick II. The king was sympathetic, as he was unable to marry his love due to class differences.

=== Women ===
- Marie Louise, Duchess of Parma (by birth an archduchess of the Imperial House of Habsburg, and by her first marriage a French empress) married morganatically twice after the death of her husband, the emperor Napoleon I. Her second husband was Count Adam Albert von Neipperg. After his death, she married Count Charles-René de Bombelles, her chamberlain, in 1834.
- Queen Maria Christina of Bourbon-Two Sicilies, regent of Spain after her husband's (Ferdinand VII) death while their daughter, Isabella II, was a minor. She married Agustín Fernando Muñoz y Sánchez, 1st Duke of Riánsares, who was one of her guards in a secret marriage.
- Princess Stéphanie of Belgium, the widow of Crown Prince Rudolf of Austria, married Count Elemér Lónyay de Nagy-Lónya et Vásáros-Namény after the death of her first husband. In 1917, Emperor Charles I of Austria conferred upon Lónyay a non-dynastic title of Prince (Fürst).

== See also ==
- Agnatic seniority
- Clandestinity (canon law)
- Lex Canuleia
- List of royal marriages to commoners

=== Unequal marriage ===
- Concubinage
- Courtesan
- Gold digger
- Hypergamy
- Inter-caste marriage
- Marriage à la façon du pays
- Misyar marriage
- Plaçage
- Signare
- Sugar baby
- War bride
