= Carl Vezerfi-Clemm =

German sculptor

Carl Vezerfi-Clemm (March 15, 1939 in Budapest, Hungary – February 17, 2012 in Munich, (Germany)) was a German sculptor, medalist and coin designer. He made commemorative coins issued by the Federal Republic of Germany, medals, sculptures and other creations.

== Biography ==
The young Carl Vezerfi-Clemm lived in Budapest (Hungary). From 1958 til 1962 he studied sculpture and painting at the Hungarian University of Fine Arts Budapest.

Since 1966 he lived in Munich, West Germany. From 1967 to 1974 he was a conservator at the Staatlichen Antikensammlungen and the Glyptothek in Munich. From 1974 to 1982 he worked as a medalist for a private mint in Munich. Since 1983 he was a freelance artist.

Carl Veterfi-Clemm was a member of the Kuenstlerkreis der Medailleure München (Artist Circle of Medalists Munich) since its foundation in 1988. Sculptors and medalists, proven in trials of coin design, joined this circle.

Carl Vezerfi-Clemm died at February 17, 2012 in his apartment in Munich after a long sickness. According to his will, his ashes were buried in silence in an unmarked grave at the Ostfriedhof (East Cemetery) in Munich.

== Creations ==
Carl Verzerfi-Clemm made commemorative coins issued by the Federal Republic of Germany, medals, sculptures and other creations such as sculptures for the Nymphenburg Porcelain Manufactory.

=== Commemorative coins issued by the Federal Republic of Germany ===
Carl Vezerfi-Clemm designed following commemorative coins issued by the Federal Republic of Germany:

==== 5 DM commemorative coins ====
- Material: 75% copper, 25% nickel with pure nickel core
- Coin diameter: 29 mm
- Weight: 10 g

===== 500th birthday of Martin Luther =====
- Obverse: Denomination
- Reverse: Martin Luther (1483–1546), reformer, after a painting of Lucas Cranach
- Edge inscription: “GOTTES WORT BLEIBT IN EWIGKEIT“
- Design and model: Carl Vezefi-Clemm
- Issued: November 10, 1983
- Mint: G, Badisches Muenzamt Karlsruhe
- Mint state (MS): 8000000 issues; Proof (PR): 350000 issues
- World Coin Catalogue No. 158, Jaeger No.: 434

===== 175th Birthday of Felix Mendelssohn Bartholdy (1984) =====
- Obverse: Denomination
- Reverse: Jacob Ludwig Felix Mendelssohn Bartholdy (1809–1847), the composer and in background a sheet music section of the overture to "A Midsummer Night's Dream".
- Edge inscription: “IHR TOENE SCHWINGT EUCH FREUDIG DURCH DIE SAITEN”
- Design and model: Carl Vezefi-Clemm
- Issued: October 20, 1984.
- Mint J, Hamburgische Muenze
- Mint state (MS): 8000000 issues; Proof (PR): 350000 issues
- World Coin Catalogue No. 160, Jaeger No.: 436

===== 200th death anniversary of Frederick the Great (1986) =====
- Last 5 DM commemorative coin -.

- Obverse: Denomination
- Reverse: Frederick II (1712–1786), Elector of Brandenburg, King of Prussia.
- Edge inscription: "ICH BIN DER ERSTE DIENER MEINES STAATES".
- Design and model: Carl Vezefi-Clemm
- Issued: October 22, 1986.
- Mint F, Wuerttembergisches Muenzamt Stuttgart.
- Mint state (MS): 8000000 issues; Proof (PR): 350000 issues
- World Coin Catalogue No. 164, Jaeger No.: 440

==== 10 DM Commemorative Coins ====
- Material: 62.5% fine silver, 37.5% copper
- Coin diameter: 32.5 mm
- Weight: 15.5 g

===== 100th death anniversary of Carl Zeiss (1988) =====
- Obverse: Denomination
- Reverse: Carl Zeiss (1816–1888), German maker of optical instruments with a microscope.
- Edge inscription: "OPTIK FÜR WISSENSCHAFT UND TECHNIK".
- Design and model: Carl Vezefi-Clemm
- Issued: October 23, 1988.
- Mint F, Wuerttembergisches Muenzamt Stuttgart.
- Mint state (MS): 8000000 issues; Proof (PR): 350000 issues
- World Coin Catalogue No. 169, Jaeger No.: 444

===== 900th birthday of Hildegard of Bingen (1998) =====
- Obverse: Denomination
- Reverse: Hildegard of Bingen (1098–1179), writing the book (Liber), "Sci vias Domini", inspired by the hand of the Lord.
- Edge inscription: "WISSE DIE WEGE DES HERRN".
- Design and model: Carl Vezefi-Clemm
- Issued: October 16, 1998.
- Mint state (MS):
  - Mint G, Badisches Muenzamt Karlsruhe: 3500000 issues
- Proof (PR):
  - Mint A, Preussische Staatsmuenze Berlin: 200000 issues
  - Mint D, Bayerisches Hauptmuenzamt, Muenchen: 200000 issues
  - Mint F, Wuerttembergisches Muenzamt Stuttgart: 200000 issues
  - Mint G, Badisches Muenzamt Karlsruhe: 200000 issues
  - Mint J, Hamburgische Muenze: 200000 issues
- World Coin Catalogue No. 192, Jaeger No.: 468
