= Ostfriedhof (Cologne) =

Cemetery in Cologne, Germany

Coordinates: 50°57′52″N 7°04′38″E

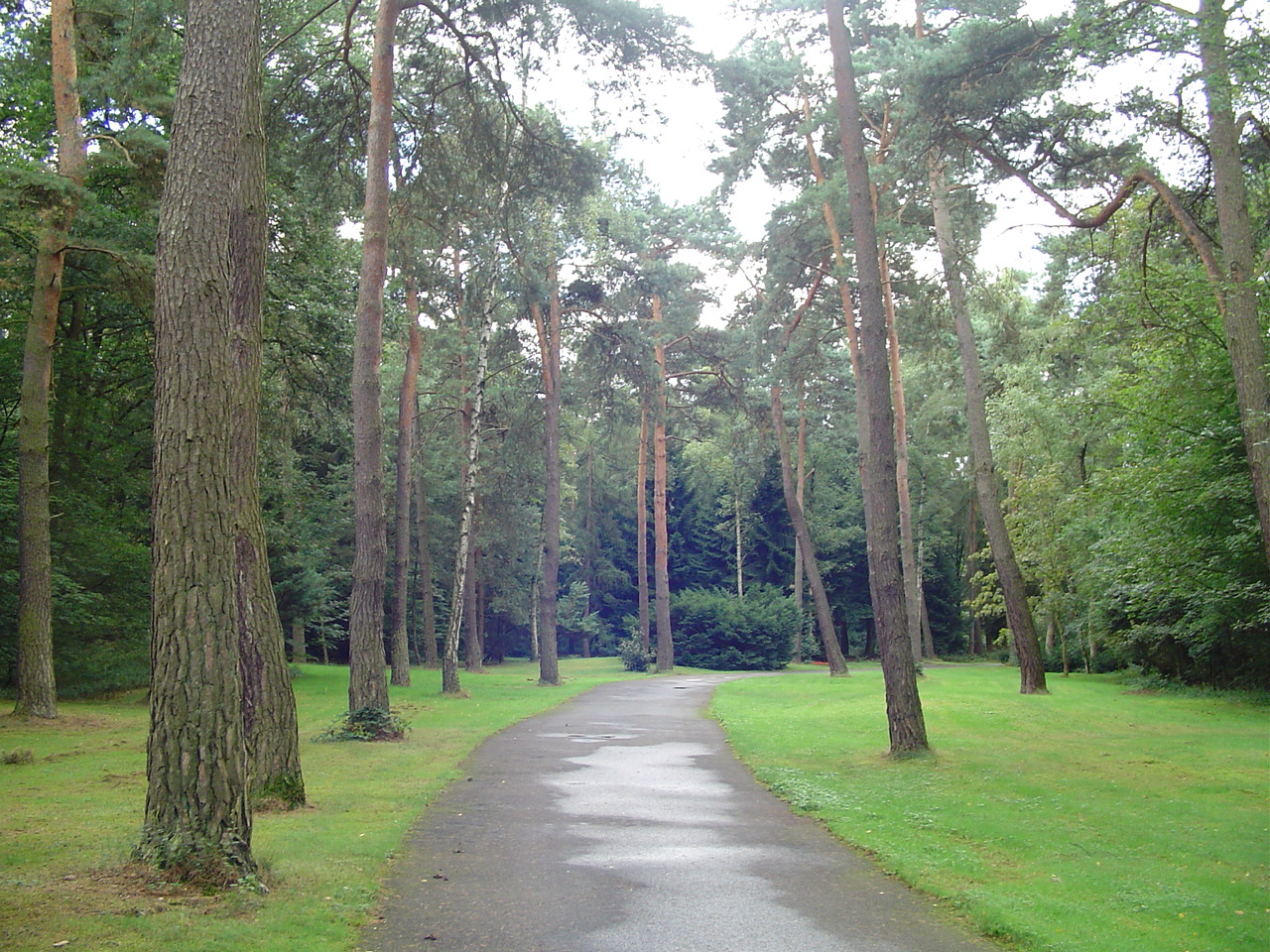
A lawn at the Ostfriedhof

Ostfriedhof is a cemetery in Cologne, Germany. It was established in 1946.
