= Satterfield =

Satterfield is a surname. Notable people with the surname include:

- Bob Satterfield, American boxer
- Bob Satterfield, American editorial cartoonist
- Brian Satterfield, American football player
- David Satterfield (disambiguation), multiple people
- Doris Satterfield, American baseball player
- Erbey Satterfield, American politician
- Jimmy Satterfield, American head football coach
- Kenny Satterfield, American basketball player
- Murray Satterfield, American college basketball coach
- Paul Satterfield, American actor
- Scott Satterfield, American football coach
- Steve Satterfield, American football coach
- Sue Musette Satterfield, American political hostess

Fictional characters:

- Lieutenant Satterfield, character in the television series Stargate SG-1
