= Ostfriedhof (Munich) =

Cemetery in Munich, Germany

Coordinates: 48.117778°N 11.588889°E

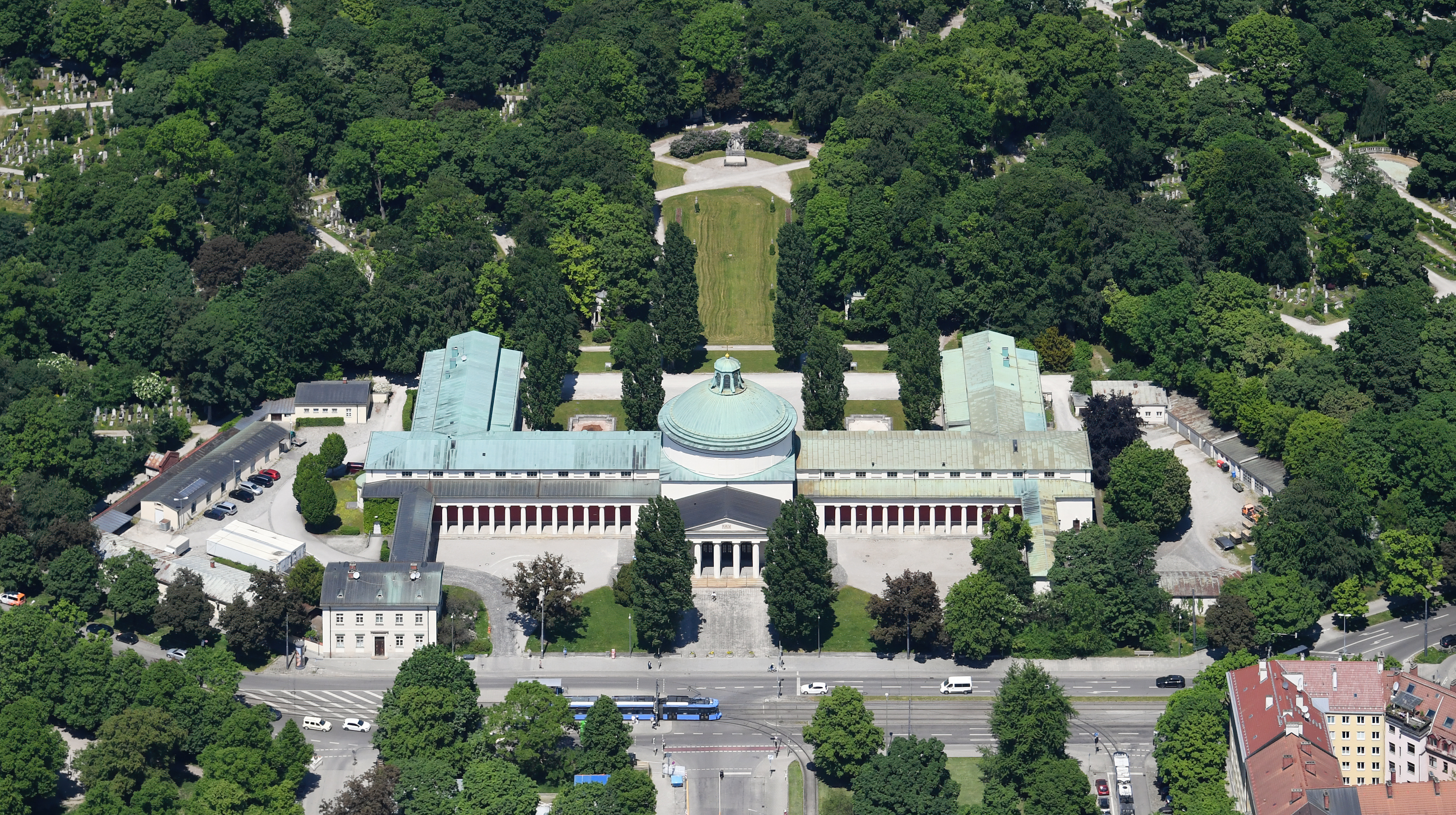
Ostfriedhof in Munich

The Ostfriedhof (German for 'Eastern Cemetery') is a cemetery in Munich, situated in the district of Obergiesing, established in 1821 and still in use. It contains an area of more than 30 hectares and approximately 34,700 burial plots.

The buildings were constructed between 1894 and 1900 to plans by Hans Grässel. In 1929 a crematorium was opened. The bodies of thousands of opponents of the Nazi régime were cremated here in the years between 1933 and 1945, and their ashes mostly disposed of without memorial. These included people executed in Stadelheim Prison, victims of the concentration camps Dachau, Birkenau and Auschwitz, and of the Aktion T4 campaign. In 1946 the bodies of several of those condemned to death at the Nuremberg War Crimes trials including Hermann Göring were cremated here, and the ashes scattered.

== History ==
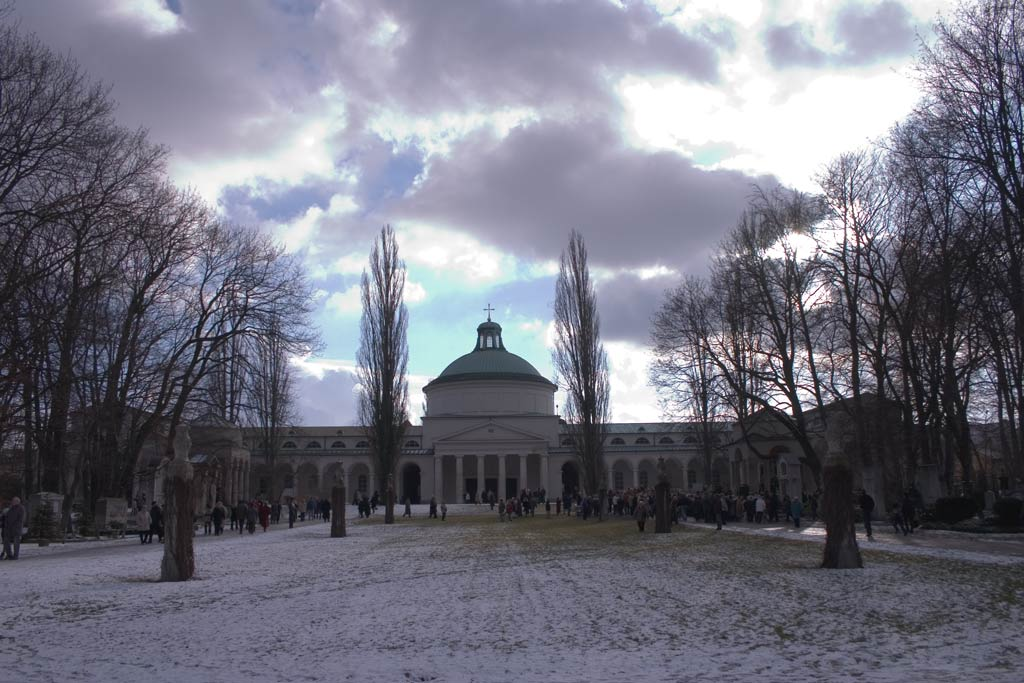
Ostfriedhof in Munich

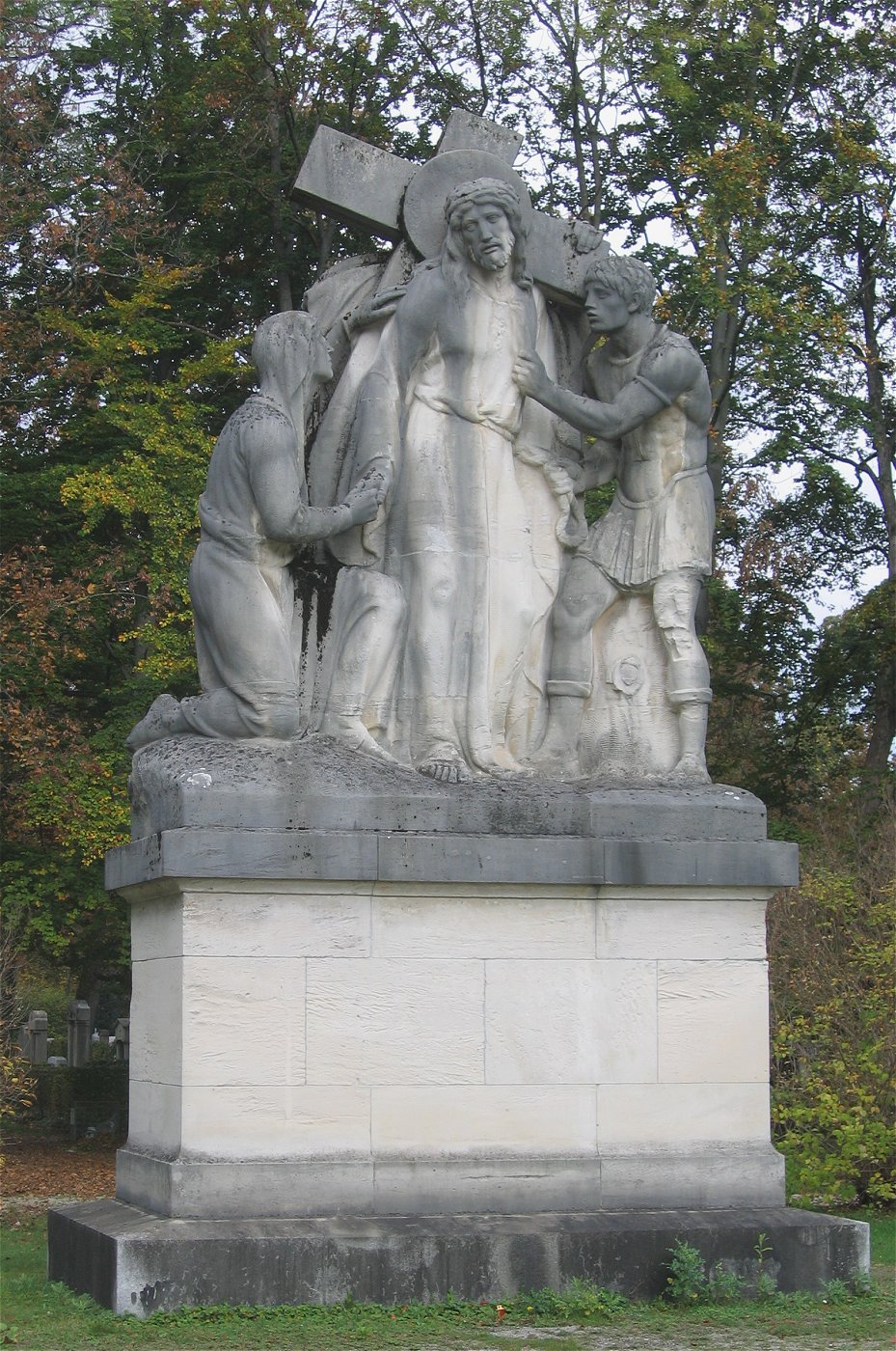
Ostfriedhof in Munich

The oldest part of the Ostfriedhof was laid out in 1817 as the burial ground of Au on a narrow strip of the Auer Flur (on the present Tegernseer Landstraße) which extended into the territory of Giesing. After several extensions and the closure of the burial ground on Gietlstraße in 1876 it also became the burial ground of Giesing.

The cemetery building on St.-Martins-Platz was constructed between 1894 and 1900 to plans by Hans Grässel. A monumental cupola painting by Josef Guntermann was added at the same time (it was destroyed in World War II). At this time the Ostfriedhof was extended to form one of the great cemeteries of the then rapidly expanding city of Munich. A feature of the construction was the arcaded vaults built to form a courtyard surrounding rows of graves.

The old chapel of the Au burial ground was destroyed in World War II. The other buildings were badly damaged, but re-built by Hans Döllgast in 1951/52.

=== Crematorium 1929 ===
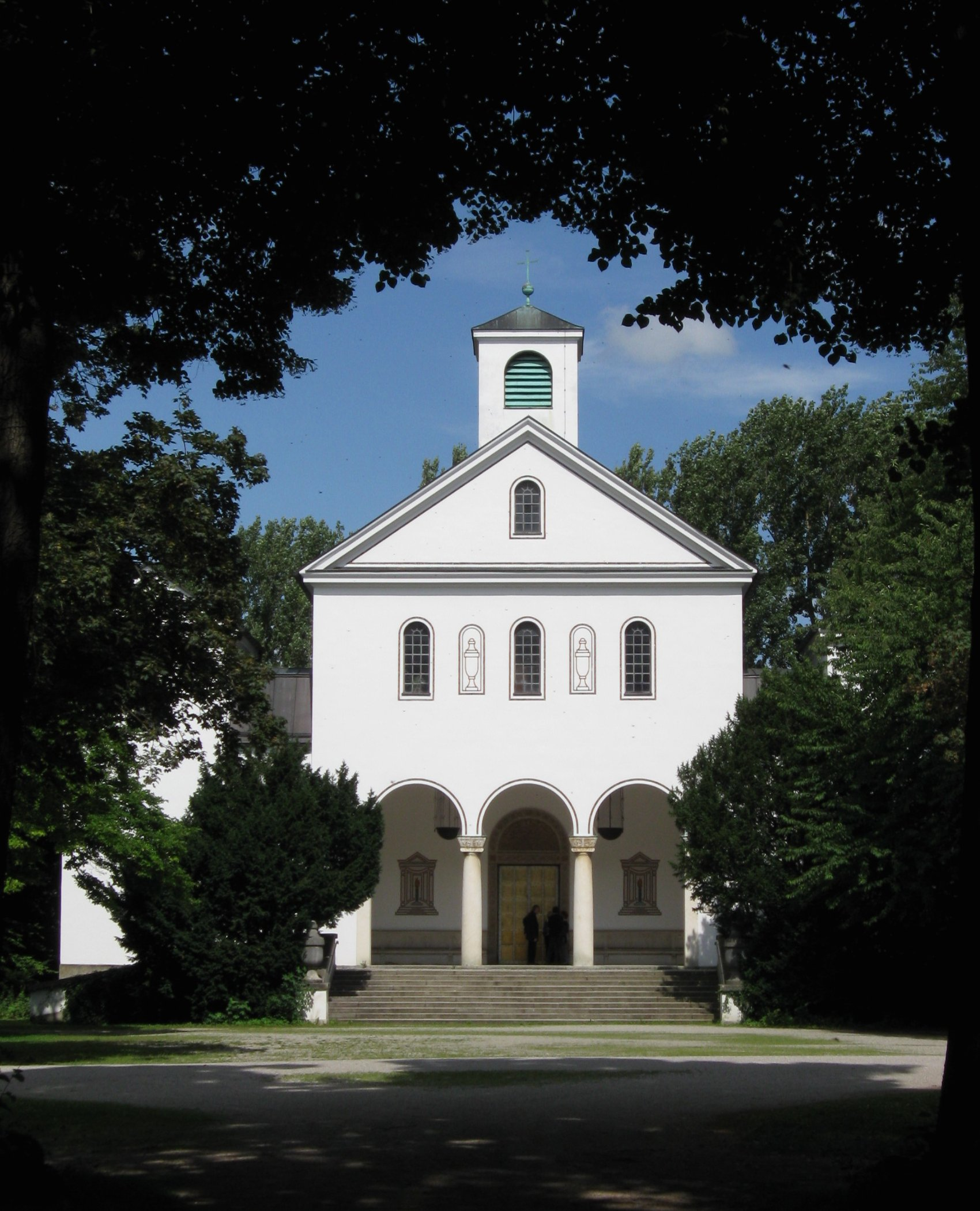
Crematorium

On 27 September 1929 the new crematorium was opened. The plain design was also by Grässel. For several days the crematorium was made accessible to public viewing, with the director of the city of Munich burial department leading the tours himself, despite criticism in the local press. There were altogether 27,000 visitors.

=== 1933 to 1945 ===
Kurt Eisner, murdered on 21 February 1919, Minister-President of the short-lived Free State which preceded the Bavarian Soviet Republic, was buried in the Ostfriedhof. On 1 May 1922 the Free Trades Unions of Munich (Münchner Freien Gewerkschaften) commissioned a monument dedicated to "the Dead of the Revolution". The urn containing Eisner's ashes was walled into its pedestal. Shortly after the Nazis took power the Monument to the Revolution was destroyed: it was demolished on 22 June 1933, and the urn with Eisner's ashes was moved to the New Jewish Cemetery, where it is still buried. The monument in the Ostfriedhof was re-created after the war by the artist Konstantin Frick as a faithful copy of the original.

In the crematorium of the Ostfriedhof the bodies of thousands of opponents of the Third Reich were incinerated. At the beginning of July 1934 the remains of 17 Nazis and opponents of Nazism killed during the Night of the Long Knives were brought to the cemetery in a furniture van (to avoid attention) and burnt. The ashes were distributed at random among many urns, to remove all traces of the dead. Among these was the journalist Fritz Gerlich, held to be one of the most far-sighted and courageous enemies of Nazism.

An unknown number of people who were murdered for political reasons in Stadelheim Prison were cremated here, as were the bodies of 3,996 detainees from the concentration camps Dachau, Auschwitz and Buchenwald as well as from the liquidation facilities of the Aktion T4 euthanasia programme.

=== After 1945 ===
On 17 October 1946 US Army trucks brought 12 coffins, purporting to contain the bodies of 12 American soldiers who had died in a hospital and were to be cremated in the presence of American officers. One was empty, and was present only in order to mislead onlookers. In reality the bodies were those of ten Nazi war criminals condemned by the Nuremberg War Crimes Trials to be hanged: Joachim von Ribbentrop, Wilhelm Keitel, Ernst Kaltenbrunner, Alfred Rosenberg, Hans Frank, Wilhelm Frick, Julius Streicher, Fritz Sauckel, Alfred Jodl, and Arthur Seyss-Inquart. The eleventh body was that of Hermann Göring, who had committed suicide before his execution could take place. In order to prevent the graves later becoming centers of veneration, the ashes were scattered in the Isar.

== Graves of notable persons ==
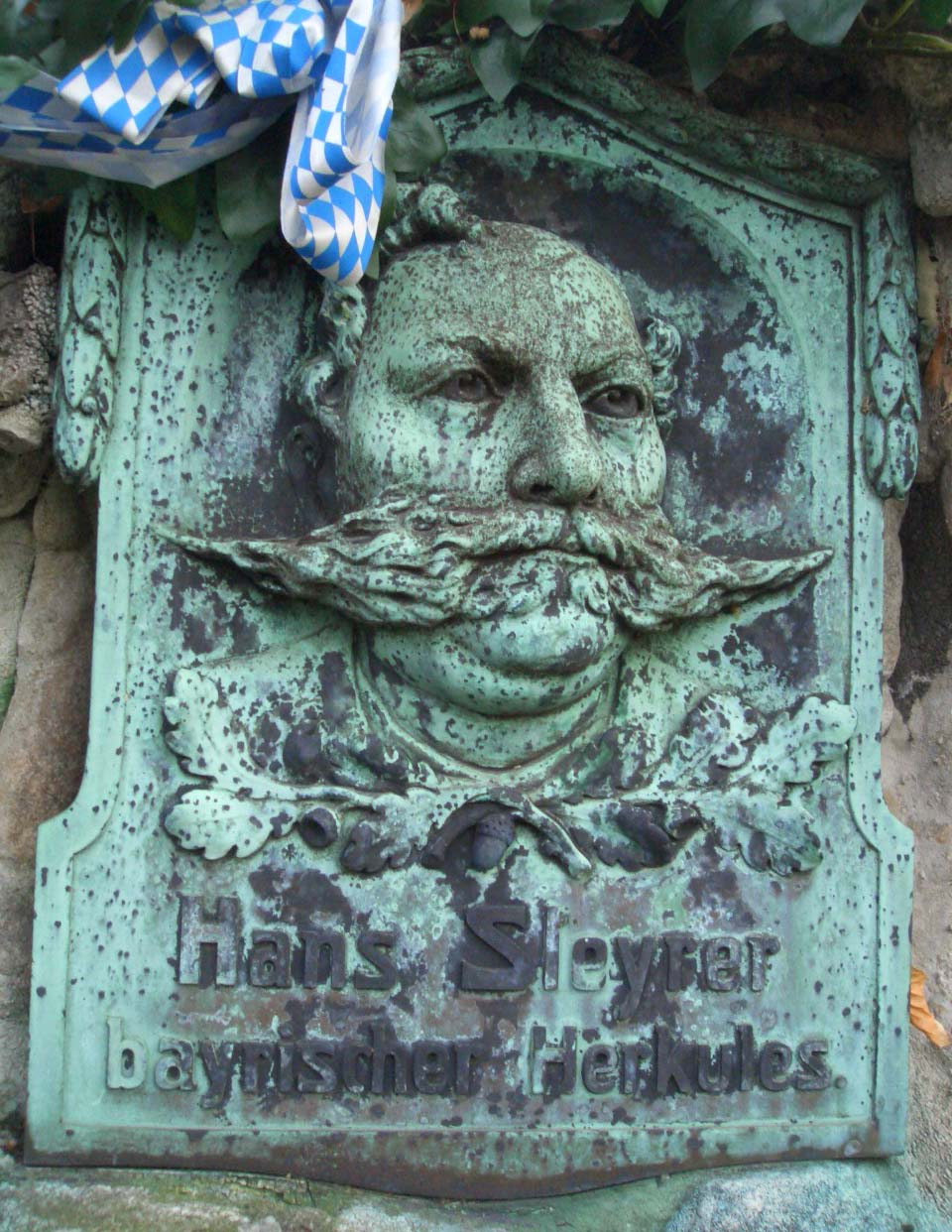
Plaque on the gravestone of Hans Steyrer

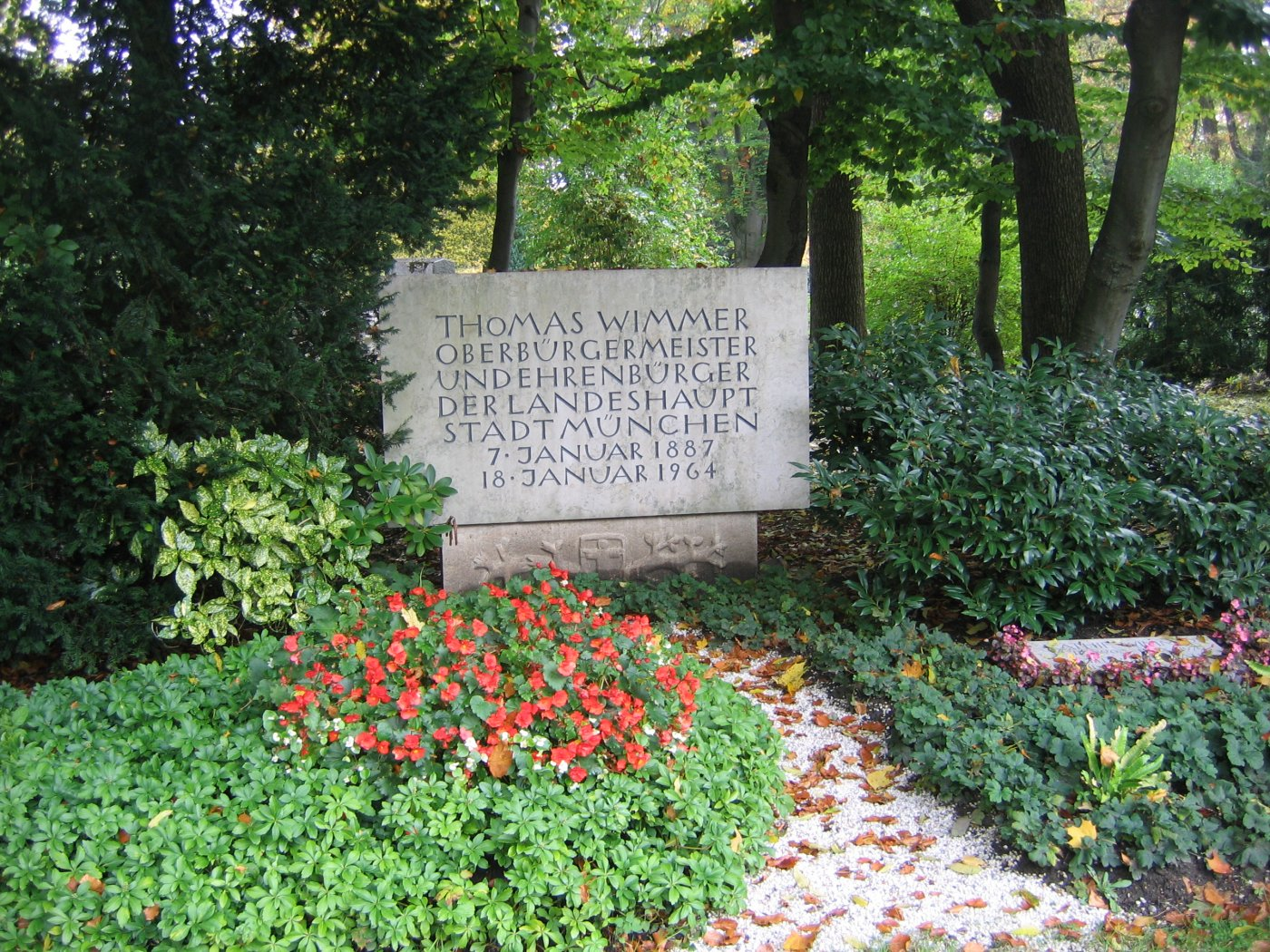
Grave of Thomas Wimmer

- Carl Amery, writer
- Georg Brauchle, Bürgermeister of Munich
- Andreas Brehme, Footballer World Cup Winner Italy 1990
- Rudolf Brunnenmeier, footballer
- Géza von Cziffra, film director and screenwriter
- Anton Dunckern (1905–1985), SS General, lawyer
- Josef Eichheim, actor
- Franz Eisenhut (1857–1903), painter
- Kurt Eisner, politician (memorial; the remains were removed and the grave destroyed in 1933)
- Jörg Fauser (1944–1987), writer
- Rudolf Christoph Freiherr von Gersdorff, Major-General, member of the 20 July plot to assassinate Hitler
- Rex Gildo (Ludwig Hirtreiter), popstar
- Adolf Gondrell, conférencier, film and theatre actor
- Bernhard von Gudden, doctor and psychiatrist; died with his most famous patient, King Ludwig II of Bavaria
- Erich Hallhuber, Bavarian folk actor and dubber
- Friedrich Hollaender, composer
- Marie Louise von Wallersee, formerly Countess Larisch, niece of Empress Elisabeth of Austria (Sissi)
- Adele Kern, opera singer
- Hilde Krahl, actress (memorial; she left her body to science)
- Peter Kreuder, composer
- Hans Leibelt, actor
- Klaus Löwitsch, actor
- Duke Ludwig Wilhelm in Bavaria (1831–1920)
- Martha Mödl, opera singer
- Rudolph Moshammer, Munich character, fashion designer and philanthropist
- Johann Rattenhuber, chief of Hitler's bodyguard
- Rudolf Rhomberg, actor
- Lothar Rohde, inventor, businessman (Rohde & Schwarz)
- Hjalmar Schacht, banker, Reichsminister of Economics and President of the Reichsbank
- Karl Scharnagl, Oberbürgermeister of Munich
- Julius Schaub, participant in the Beer Hall Putsch of 1923; Hitler's senior adjutant
- Sybille Schmitz, actress
- Rudolf Schündler, director, actor
- Joe Stöckel, actor and film director
- Barbara Valentin (Uschi Ledersteger), actress
- Carl Vezerfi-Clemm (1939–2012), sculptor, medallist, coin designer
- Thomas Wimmer, Oberbürgermeister of Munich
- Wastl Witt, folk actor

== Literature ==
- Munich City Archives
- Benedikt Weyerer: München 1933–1949 – Stadtrundgänge zur politischen Geschichte. MünchenVerlag, München 2006, ISBN 3-927984-18-3.
- Erich Scheibmayr: Letzte Heimat – Persönlichkeiten in Münchner Friedhöfen. MünchenVerlag, München 1985, ISBN 3-9802211-0-5.
- Erich Scheibmayr: Wer? Wann? Wo? 3 Teile. MünchenVerlag, München 1989, 1997, 2002, ISBN 3-9802211-1-3, ISBN 3-9802211-3-X, ISBN 3-9802211-4-8.
- Willibald Karl: Der Münchner Ostfriedhof – Von den „Auer Leichenäckern“ zum Großstadt-Krematorium. Zwei Rundgänge. MünchenVerlag, München 2011, ISBN 978-3-937090-58-0.
