= Antonie Barth =

German actress and aristocrat (1871-1956)

Antonie Barth Baroness von Bartolf
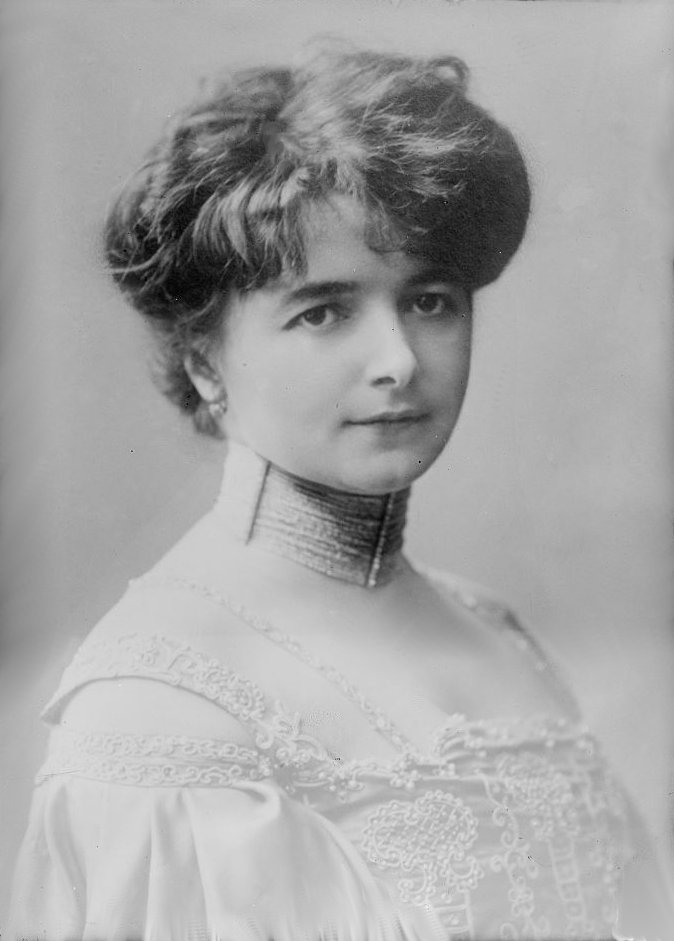
- Antonie von Bartolf, circa 1910–1915, Library of Congress
- Born: Barbara Antonie Barth; 25 October 1871; Munich, German Empire
- Died: 23 May 1956 (aged 84); Garmisch-Partenkirchen, West Germany
- Other names: Antonie von Bartolf
- Occupation: Ballet prima donna
- Spouses: Duke Ludwig Wilhelm in Bavaria (m. 1892; div. 1913) Georg Maximillian Mayr (m. 1914)

Barbara Antonie Barth (1871–1956), was a member of the Munich ballet, who became Frau Antonie von Bartolf after she married Duke Ludwig Wilhelm in Bavaria, the brother of Empress Elisabeth of Austria.

== Life ==
Antonie was in Munich as the daughter of Ludwig Barth and his wife, Marie Clara Beyhl. She was ennobled by the Regent of Bavaria under the family name of Von Bartolf and received the title Baroness von Bartolf. They were married in Munich, Bayern (Bavaria) on November 19, 1892 when she was the age of twenty-one and the duke was a sixty-one year old widower. The duke's first wife, Darmstadt actress Henrietta Mendel, died the previous year on November 12, 1891. Bartolf and the duke were married for more than 20 years in what has been described as a "very happy marriage", but beginning in 1906, the duke had declared his intention to marry Fraulein Tordek, a prima donna of the Munich royal opera house. Bartolf left the duke in 1907 when she feared for her life. In 1909, when divorce proceedings began, Bartolf was said to have been physically abused, forced to participate in his cruel tricks, and treated "as a horse, a dog, and a goat and cheated her out of her pin money" by the duke during their marriage. They divorced in July 1913 after Frau Bartolf gave birth to a daughter, Hélène that the duke claimed was not his child. Helena Mayr von Bartolf married Prince Friedrich Christian of Schaumburg-Lippe.

In 1914, Bartolf married Lieutenant Georg Maximillian Mayr (Maximilian Mayr, Max Mayer), who was formerly the duke's adjutant. Antonie von Bartolf Mayr died in 1956.
