= List of lords of Mailly =

Coat of arms of de Mailly family

The Lords of Mailly were an ancient and powerful French noble house, originated from Picardy, France.
