= Miguel de Bragança, Duke of Lafões =

Portuguese aristocrat (1699–1724)

Dom Michael of Braganza (Portuguese: Miguel de Bragança) was a Portuguese infante, illegitimate son of King Pedro II of Portugal and of the French lady Anne Armande Pastre de Verger (sometimes called du Vergé). Miguel was legitimated by his half-brother, King John V of Portugal, who demanded he should be regarded as his brother. He was born in Lisbon on 15 October 1699, and died by drowning in the Tagus River on 13 January 1724.

== Marriage and descendants ==
He married Dona Luísa Casimira de Sousa Nassau e Ligne, Princess of Ligne by her birth, and, through her mother, heiress of a rich and old Portuguese noble family: she was 30th Lady of the House of Sousa, 6th Countess of Miranda do Corvo and honorary Duchess of Lafões.

They had two sons and two daughters.

- Joana Francisca Antónia Perpétua de Bragança (1715-...), married to the 4th Marquess of Cascais, without issue;
- Pedro Henrique de Bragança e Ligne de Sousa Tavares Mascarenhas da Silva (1718–1761), 1st Duke of Lafões, 3rd Marquis of Arronches and 7th Count of Miranda do Corvo. No legitimate issue;
- João Carlos de Bragança e Ligne de Sousa Tavares Mascarenhas da Silva (1719–1806), 2nd Duke of Lafões, 4th Marquis of Arronches and 8th Count of Miranda do Corvo. His issue carried on the House of Lafões;
- Francisca de Bragança (1720–1721).
