= Marquis of Arronches =

- Creation date: 1674
- Present holder: D. Carolina de Casal Ribeiro Bravo de Bragança (born 1980), Marchioness of Arronches
- Arms: Sousa Family Arms (as marquesses of Arronches)

The nobility title Marquis of Arronches was created on April 27, 1674 by D. Afonso VI of Portugal in favour of Henrique de Sousa Tavares, 3rd Count of Miranda do Corvo and 28th Lord of Sousa.

The present Marchioness of Arronches is D. Carolina do Casal Ribeiro Bravo de Bragança Sarmento Beja (born in Lisbon on 26 April 1980), the daughter of D. Afonso Caetano de Barros e Carvalhosa de Bragança (born in Lisbon on 11 January 1956). Her father was also the 7th Duke of Lafões, 10th Marquis of Arronches, 13th Count of Miranda do Corvo, 9th Marquis of Marialva, 10th Count of Cantanhede, all by "juro e herdade", 3rd Duke of Miranda do Corvo and 4rd Count of Cavaleiros, certified by the Portuguese Institute of Nobility on 23 October 2008.

== List of title holders ==
Title holders/heirs

1. D. Henrique de Sousa Tavares (1626–1706), 3rd Count of Miranda do Corvo and 28th Lord of Sousa,
2. Dona Mariana Luísa Francisca de Sousa Tavares Mascarenhas e Silva (1672–1743), 5th Countess of Miranda do Corvo and 29th Lady of Sousa; granddaughter of the previous holder,
3. D. Pedro Henrique de Bragança e Ligne de Sousa Tavares Mascarenhas da Silva (1718–1743), 1st Duke of Lafões and 7th count of Miranda do Corvo; grandson of the previous holder; died with no legitimate descendants, succeeded by his brother,
4. D. João Carlos de Bragança e Ligne de Sousa Tavares Mascarenhas da Silva (1719–1806), 2nd Duke of Lafões and 8th Count of Miranda do Corvo; succeeded by his daughter,
5. Dona Ana Maria de Bragança e Ligne de Sousa Tavares Mascarenhas da Silva (1797–1851), 3rd Duchess of Lafões and 9th Countess of Miranda do Corvo; succeeded by her daughter,
6. Dona Maria Carlota de Bragança e Ligne de Sousa Tavares Mascarenhas da Silva (1820–1865), 34th Lady of Sousa; succeeded by her son,
7. D. Caetano Segismundo de Bragança e Ligne de Sousa Tavares Mascarenhas da Silva (1856–1927), 4th Duke of Lafões, succeeded by his son,
8. D. Afonso de Bragança, 5th Duke of Lafões (1893–1946), succeeded by his son,
9. D. Lopo de Bragança, 6th Duke of Lafões (1921–2008); died with no descendants, succeeded by his nephew,
10. D. Afonso Caetano de Barros e Carvalhosa de Bragança (1956–2021), son of D. Miguel Bernardo de Bragança (1927–2002) – brother of D. Lopo – and his wife, D. Maria da Assunção de Barros e Carvalhosa (1927–2003), daughter of the 3rd Viscount of Santarém and granddaughter of the 3rd Marquis of Funchal, succeeded by his son,
11. D. Miguel Bernardo de Casal Ribeiro Bravo de Bragança (b. 1982), inherited the title in 2021, succeeded by his sister,
12. D. Carolina de Casal Ribeiro Bravo de Bragança (b. 1980), the current Marchioness of Arronches since 2022, is the daughter of D. Afonso Caetano de Barros e Carvalhosa de Bragança (born in Lisbon on 11 January 1956 – died in Lisbon on 28 May 2021)

== Bibliography ==
1. Anuário da Nobreza de Portugal, Ano III, tomo I, Lisboa, Instituto Português de Heráldica, 1985, pp. 19–21, em Duques de Lafões.
2. PINTO, Albano da Silveira; BAÊNA, Visconde de Sanches de, Resenha das famílias titulares e grandes de Portugal, vol. I, Lisboa, Empreza Editora de Francisco Arthur da Silva, 1885, p. 408, vol II, 1883, pp. 145–146.
3. Nobreza de Portugal e do Brasil (direcção de Afonso Eduardo Martins Zúquete), Lisboa, Editorial Enciclopédia Lda, 1961, vol. II, pp. 322–324, em Marqueses de Arronches, e pp. 665–669, em Duques de Lafões.
