= Dukedom =

Dukedom may refer to:

- The title and office of a duke
- Duchy, a realm ruled by a duke or duchess
- Dukedom, Kentucky and Tennessee, United States
- Dukedom (game), a land management game

== See also ==
- Lists of dukedoms
