= Lists of dukedoms =

Lists of dukedoms include:

- List of dukedoms in the peerages of Britain and Ireland
  - Royal dukedoms in the United Kingdom
- List of French dukedoms
- Dukedoms in Portugal
- List of dukedoms in Spain
- Duchies in Sweden

== See also ==
- Lists of dukes
