= Dukedoms in Portugal =

Noble titles of Portugal
Dukedoms of Portugal
Marquisates of Portugal
Countships of Portugal
Viscountcies of Portugal
Baronies of Portugal

This is a list of the dukedoms created in the Kingdom of Portugal.

== History ==
The title of Duke occupies the summit of the Portuguese nobiliary hierarchy. In the majority of instances it was conferred upon close relatives of the royal family, and above all upon the second-born sons of the monarchs.

The earliest Portuguese dukedoms were those of Coimbra and Viseu, both created in 1415 by John I for the infantes Pedro and Henrique. There followed that of Braganza, created in 1442, during the regency of the Infante D. Pedro in the name of Afonso V, in favour of Afonso, son of John I and 8th Count of Barcelos.

The influence of the English court weighed upon this practice, it being customary there to create a dukedom for a member of the royal family other than the heir apparent to the crown. Queen Philippa of Lancaster, mother of the first three Portuguese dukes, contributed to its diffusion in Portugal.

From the 19th century onwards, following the establishment of the liberal régime, the title of Duke, like other titles of nobility, came to be employed as a reward for eminent services rendered to the nation. A notable instance is that of António José de Ávila who, possessing no tie of blood to the Royal House, received the title of Duke of Ávila and Bolama for having secured for Portugal the possession of Bolama, in what was then Portuguese Guinea, disputed by the United Kingdom, through the mediation of the American president Ulysses S. Grant.

== Classes ==
The Portuguese titles of Duke are divided into the following types, ranked within the nobiliary hierarchy as follows:

No.	Precedence	Type	Transmission	Description	Examples
1st	Dukedoms of the Royal House	Royal hereditary	Hereditary	Conferred upon the heir presumptive to the crown, who upon his accession to the throne transmits it to his own heir. It comprises the Dukedom of Braganza alone.	Braganza
1st	Dukedoms of the Royal House	Royal courtesy	Non-hereditary	Granted occasionally to members of the Royal Family.	Coimbra, Viseu, Beja, Porto
2nd	Dukedoms with Honours of Kinship	With Honours of Kinship	According to the underlying title	A distinction added to titles held de juro e herdade or for life, conferring upon the holder the treatment due to a relative of the royal family and precedence over the remaining dukedoms not belonging to the Royal House.	Cadaval, Terceira, Saldanha
3rd	Dukedoms de juro e herdade	De juro e herdade	Hereditary	Titles of noble families, transmissible to the heirs of the holder.	Aveiro, Lafões, Palmela, Loulé
4th	Dukedoms for life	For life	Non-hereditary	Conferred as a reward or an homage upon a distinguished personage, and not passing automatically to his heirs.	Ávila and Bolama, Elvas
5th	Courtesy dukes	Courtesy	Non-hereditary	Conferred by virtue of the exercise of the office of camareira-mor (chief lady-in-waiting to the Queen), and not passing automatically to the holder's heirs.	Abrantes, Tancos, Ficalho

In all, twenty-nine ducal titles were created in Portugal. (Note: This figure includes the dukedom of Elvas, the grant of which to William Carr Beresford is referred to by several authors but for which no instrument of grant is known. Excluding it, the ducal titles created would number twenty-eight.)

== Dukedoms ==
=== Dukes of the Royal House ===
Arms	Title	Creation	First Holder	Nature	Present claimant under the Republic	Ref.
King John I (1385–1433)
	Duke of Coimbra	1415 (1st dukedom granted in Portugal)	Pedro, Infante of Portugal	Royal courtesy	Maria Francisca Isabel of Braganza	
	Duke of Viseu	1415 (1st dukedom in Portugal)	Henrique, Infante of Portugal	Royal courtesy	Miguel of Braganza	
Regency of the Infante Pedro in the name of King Afonso V (1439–1448)
	Duke of Braganza	1442	Afonso, 8th Count of Barcelos and 2nd Count of Neiva	Royal hereditary	Duarte Pio of Braganza	
King Afonso V (1448–1481)
	Duke of Beja	1453	Fernando, Infante of Portugal	Royal courtesy	No claimant (from Peter IV onwards it came to be reserved for a younger son of the monarch, in principle the third, yielding second place to the Duke of Porto)	
	Duke of Guimarães	1475	Fernando II, 3rd Duke of Braganza and 1st Count of Guimarães	Royal courtesy	Afonso of Braganza	
King John III (1521–1557)
	Duke of Guarda	5 October 1530	Fernando, Infante of Portugal and Lord of Trancoso	Royal courtesy	Extinct	
	Duke of Trancoso	5 October 1530	Infante Ferdinand, Duke of Guarda and Lord of Abrantes	Royal courtesy	Extinct	
King Sebastian (1557–1578)
	Duke of Barcelos	5 August 1562	João I, 13th Count of Barcelos and heir to the Dukedom of Braganza, being subsequently 6th Duke of Braganza	Royal courtesy	Afonso of Braganza	
Regent King Peter IV in the name of Queen Maria II (1832–1834)
	Duke of Porto	1833	Maria II	Royal courtesy	Dinis of Braganza	

=== Dukes with Honours of Kinship ===
The dukedoms which follow enjoyed Honours of Kinship, occupying within the nobiliary hierarchy the position immediately below the dukedoms of the Royal House. The nature of each title appears in the respective column.

Arms	Title	Creation	First Holder	Nature	Present claimant under the Republic	Ref.
King John IV (1640–1656)
	Duke of Cadaval	26 April 1648	Nuno Álvares Pereira de Melo, 4th Marquess of Ferreira and 5th Count of Tentúgal	For life (renewed)	Diana Álvares Pereira de Melo	
Regent King Peter IV in the name of Queen Maria II (1832–1834)
	Duke of Terceira	8 November 1832	António José Severim de Noronha, 1st Marquess and 7th Count of Vila Flor	Juro e herdade	Lourenço Manoel de Vilhena de Freitas	
Queen Maria II (1834–1853)
	Duke of Saldanha	4 November 1846	João Carlos de Saldanha Oliveira e Daun, 1st Count and Marquess of Saldanha	Juro e herdade	José Augusto de Saldanha Oliveira e Daun	

=== Dukes de juro e herdade ===
Arms	Title	Creation	First Holder	Present claimant under the Republic	Ref.
King John III (1521–1557)
	Duke of Aveiro	1535	João de Lencastre, 1st Marquess of Torres Novas	Extinct	
King Philip III (1621–1640)
	Duke of Linhares	1621	Fernando de Noronha, 5th Count of Linhares	Extinct	
King John V (1706–1750)
	Duke of Lafões	17 February 1718	Pedro Henrique de Bragança, 3rd Marquess of Arronches and 7th Count of Miranda do Corvo	Miguel Bernardo de Bragança	
Regency of Prince John in the name of Queen Maria I (1792–1816)
	Duke of Victoria (Note: The nature of the grant is not established by the sources cited. According to Zuquete, no decrees of renewal are known for the title up to 1910, and subsequent holders, heads of the House of Wellington, have used the title by succession.)	18 December 1812	Arthur Wellesley, 1st Duke of Wellington	Arthur Charles Wellesley	
Queen Maria II (1834–1853)
	Duke of Palmela	10 October 1850	Pedro de Sousa Holstein, 1st Count and Marquess of Palmela and 1st Duke of Faial	Pedro de Sousa e Holstein Beck	
	Duke of Loulé	3 October 1852	Nuno José de Mendonça, 2nd Marquess of Loulé and 9th Count of Vale dos Reis	Pedro José Folque de Mendonça	

=== Dukes for life ===
Arms	Title	Creation	First Holder	Present claimant under the Republic	Ref.
King Philip I (1581–1598)
	Duke of Vila Real	28 February 1585	Manuel de Menezes, 5th Marquess of Vila Real	Extinct	
King Philip II (1598–1621)
	Duke of Torres Novas	26 September 1619	Jorge de Lencastre, 3rd Marquess of Torres Novas and heir to the Dukedom of Aveiro (having died before he could inherit it)	Extinct	
	Duke of Caminha	14 December 1620	Miguel Luís de Menezes, 6th Marquess of Vila Real	Extinct	
Regency of Prince John in the name of Queen Maria I (1792–1816)
	Duke of Miranda do Corvo	13 May 1796	José de Bragança e Ligne de Sousa, heir to the Dukedom of Lafões (having died before he could inherit it)	Miguel Bernardo de Bragança	
	Duke of Elvas (attribution disputed; no instrument of grant is known)	1817 (date disputed; already referred to as duke in 1814)	William Carr Beresford, 1st Marquess of Campo Maior and 1st Count of Trancoso	Extinct (1854)	
Regent King Peter IV in the name of Queen Maria II (1832–1834)
	Duke of Faial	4 April 1833	Pedro de Sousa Holstein, 1st Count and Marquess of Palmela and subsequently 1st Duke of Palmela	Extinct (replaced, at the holder's request, by the Dukedom of Palmela)	
King Luís I (1861–1889)
	Duke of Ávila and Bolama	14 May 1878	António José de Ávila, 1st Count and Marquess of Ávila	Extinct	
	Duke of Albuquerque	19 May 1886	João Afonso da Costa de Sousa de Macedo, 2nd Count and 4th Viscount of Mesquitela	Extinct	

=== Courtesy dukes ===
Arms	Title	Creation	First Holder	Present claimant under the Republic	Ref.
King Joseph I (1750–1777)
	Duke of Abrantes	9 December 1753	Ana Maria Catarina de Lorena, 3rd Marchioness of Abrantes	Extinct	
Queen Maria I (1777–1792)
	Duke of Tancos	22 April 1790	Constança Manuel, 2nd Marchioness of Tancos and 7th Countess of Atalaia	Extinct	
Queen Maria II (1834–1853)
	Duke of Ficalho	4 May 1836	Eugénia Maurícia de Almeida Portugal, 1st Marchioness of Ficalho (widow of the 2nd Count of Ficalho)	Extinct	

== See also ==
- Portuguese Royal House
- Portuguese nobility
- List of marquisates in Portugal
- List of countships in Portugal
- List of viscountcies in Portugal
- List of baronies in Portugal
