= Nevada Stoody Hayes =

American socialite and Portuguese royal (1870–1941)

Dona Nevada
- Duchess of Porto
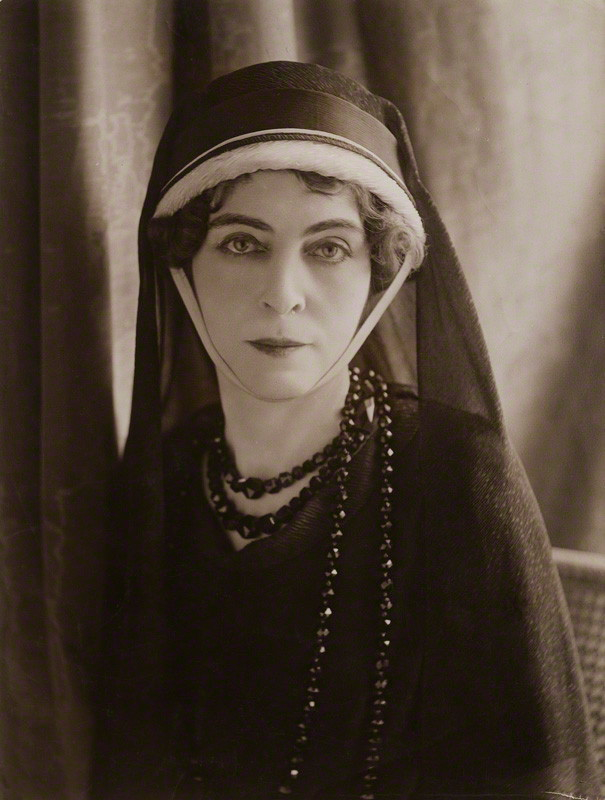
- The Duchess of Porto in 1920
- Born: Nevada Stoody; 21 October 1870; Sandyville, Ohio
- Died: 11 January 1941 (aged 70); Tampa, Florida
- Spouse: Lee Albert Agnew, Sr (m. 1897; div. 1905) William Hayes Chapman (m. 1905; died 1907) Philip Henry Van Volkenburgh, Jr (m. 1909; div. 1914) Infante Afonso, Duke of Porto (m. 1917; died 1920)
- Issue: Lee Albert "David" Agnew, Jr
- House: Braganza-Saxe-Coburg and Gotha (by marriage)
- Father: Jacob Walter Stoody
- Mother: Nancy Miranda McNeel
- Occupation: Socialite

Nevada Stoody Hayes (21 October 1870 – 11 January 1941), sometimes called Nevada of Braganza, was an American socialite who became the wife of Infante Afonso of Braganza, Duke of Porto, whose nephew, Manuel II, was the last king of Portugal. She was the Princess Royal of Portugal – if not, an Infanta of Portugal – but was never accepted as a member of the exiled Portuguese royal family, albeit her marriage to the Infante Afonso under the Portuguese law was legal.

== Early life ==
Nevada was born on 21 October 1870 (or in 1885) in Sandyville, Ohio, to Jacob Walter Stoody and Nancy Miranda (née McNeel) Stoody. Her maternal grandparents were James Powell McNeel and Sarah Yell (née Chase) McNeel, niece of Governor Archibald Yell.

== Personal life ==
=== First marriage ===
Her first husband was inventor Lee Albert Agnew (1867-1924), whom she divorced in 1906. Despite the divorce, Agnew maintained warm feelings toward his former wife, and after he died on 31 January 1924, his will left her his estate's income not earmarked for the support of their son, Lee Albert "David" Agnew, Jr. (1903-1977).

=== Second marriage ===
The day after her divorce from Agnew, Stoody married William Hayes Chapman (1834-1907), a distant relative of U.S. President Rutherford B. Hayes and founder of the Chapman & Turner department stores, then in his early seventies. When he bequeathed her more than $8 million at his death a year later, the newspapers dubbed her "the $10 million widow".

Excerpt from Mrs. Astor’s 400:

She immediately went to Europe where it was reported that those vying for her hand included Lord Falconer (later the 10th Earl of Kintore who married American heiress Helen Zimmerman, formerly Duchess of Manchester), Count A. F. Cherep-Spiridovich (a younger officer in the army of the Tsar), Prince Mohammed Ali Hassan of Egypt, and Count Aubert de Sonis who came from Paris to New York on the same ship with the widow. While the Count was in the lobby of the St. Regis Hotel waiting to present flowers and a proposal of marriage, she departed by a rear exit with Philip Van Valkenburgh, a prominent member of an old New York family (but, obviously in need of some of her money, she would soon come to find out). They were married in Connecticut on 23 November 1909 and were divorced after a short-time amid protracted legal battles; she finally settled $200,000 upon him in 1910 ...

=== Third marriage ===
Nevada married for a third time to Philip Henry Van Volkenburgh, Jr. (1853-1949), a New York lawyer and banker, and descendant of an old Dutch American patroon family from Albany, on November 23, 1909, in Greenwich, Connecticut. Shortly after their marriage, however, they separated and she took up residence in Pomfret, Connecticut, a state which required three years residency before a suit for divorce could be brought. In 1913, Philip had her served with divorce papers while she was at the Hotel Vanderbilt in New York City. In turn, she sued him, and the following year, she obtained an uncontested divorce from Volkenburgh in Putnam, Connecticut, on grounds of desertion in 1914.

=== Fourth marriage ===
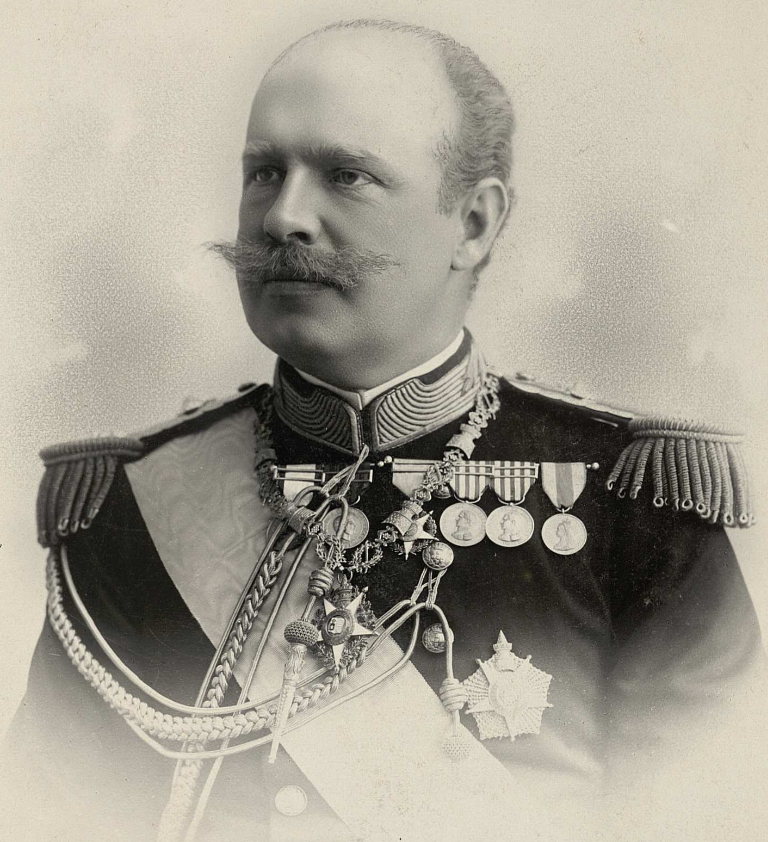
Dom Afonso of Braganza (1865–1920)

Her fourth and last husband was the Duke of Porto, Dom Afonso of Braganza (1865–1920), Infante of Portugal, whom she married morganatically, in a civil ceremony on 26 September 1917 in Rome, and again in a second civil ceremony – before a consular officer of the Portuguese Republic –, followed by a religious wedding, on 23 November of the same year in Madrid, under the name of Madame Nevada Stoody Hayes-Chapman. Hayes began styling herself "Her Royal Highness, Nevada, the Duchess of Porto", but the Portuguese royal family never recognized her as a member. Afonso tried to have his wife accepted by his family, but was rebuffed.

Three years later, on 21 February 1920, at Naples, Italy, the duke died, without having ever renounced his rights to the throne. Hayes traveled from Italy to Portugal with the body of her late husband and arranged for its installation in the Braganza pantheon in the Monastery of São Vicente de Fora in Lisbon. Although the terms of a morganatic marriage exclude the surviving spouse from inheriting any of the titles or privileges that are the prerogatives of royalty (while the concept of morganatic marriage has never explicitly existed anywhere in Portugal), they do not exclude the survivor from inheriting property. In his will, Dom Afonso left his entire estate to Nevada Stoody Hayes.

Excerpt from Mrs. Astor's 400:

He forfeited his inheritance rights to the throne by his marriage and his financial allowance from the royal family was cut.

Nevada styled herself as the Crown Princess of Portugal. Her husband was the uncle of King Manuel of Portugal and only brother of King Manuel's father, the murdered King Carlos. King Victor Emanuel, a cousin of the Duke of Oporto, gave him asylum in the Royal Palace in Naples and a reported allowance of $10,000 per year. The Duke of Oporto died in Naples in 1920 having fled there after the Portuguese Revolution. After the death of the King of Portugal, Nevada petitioned the republican government – to no avail – to grant her all the royal family's funds as she considered herself its senior member.

She sailed to the U. S. in 1921 to have made a silver casket on a bronze base (weighing half a ton) in which to convey her late husband's body from Naples to Lisbon. There it would be displayed in the Pantheon before the Duke of Porto was buried next to his murdered brother, the late King. In 1935 the Duchess of Porto traveled on the Ile de France to New York where she reported that, having spent two months in Germany, she was "greatly impressed by Adolf Hitler."

She jealously guarded (and according to all precedent, she and the hypocritical status phoniness of that period, she was correct in asserting her marital rights) what she perceived as her rights as Crown Princess and once, on a trans-Atlantic cruise which also included the Grand Duchess Marie of Russia, to ensure that she be seated on the Captain's right at dinner rather than the Grand Duchess, she entered the dining room ahead of all other guests to take her seat. She died 11 January 1941 in Tampa, Florida, at St. Joseph's Hospital after an illness of 10 days. She had spent the winter in Tampa for the preceding 10-years. She left a son, Lee Albert "David" Agnew, Jr., of New York, and four sisters (...).

Nevada Stoody Hayes died at Saint Joseph's Hospital in Tampa, Florida, in 1941, at age 70.

After her death, the Foundation of the House of Bragança bought the painting "Battle of Cape St. Vincent", a Portuguese national treasure that had been included in her inheritance, depicting a victory of the fleet of Maria II of Portugal over the fleet of Miguel I of Portugal during the Liberal Wars. It is now located in the Maritime Museum in Lisbon.
