= Duke =

Monarchy and nobility title

Duke is a male title either of a monarch ruling over a duchy, or of a member of royalty, or nobility. As rulers, dukes are ranked below emperors, kings, grand princes, grand dukes, and above sovereign princes. As royalty or nobility, they are ranked below grand dukes and above or below princes, depending on the country or specific title. The title comes from French duc, itself from the Latin dux, 'leader', a term used in republican Rome to refer to a military commander without an official rank, and later coming to mean the leading military commander of a province. In most countries, the word duchess is the female equivalent.

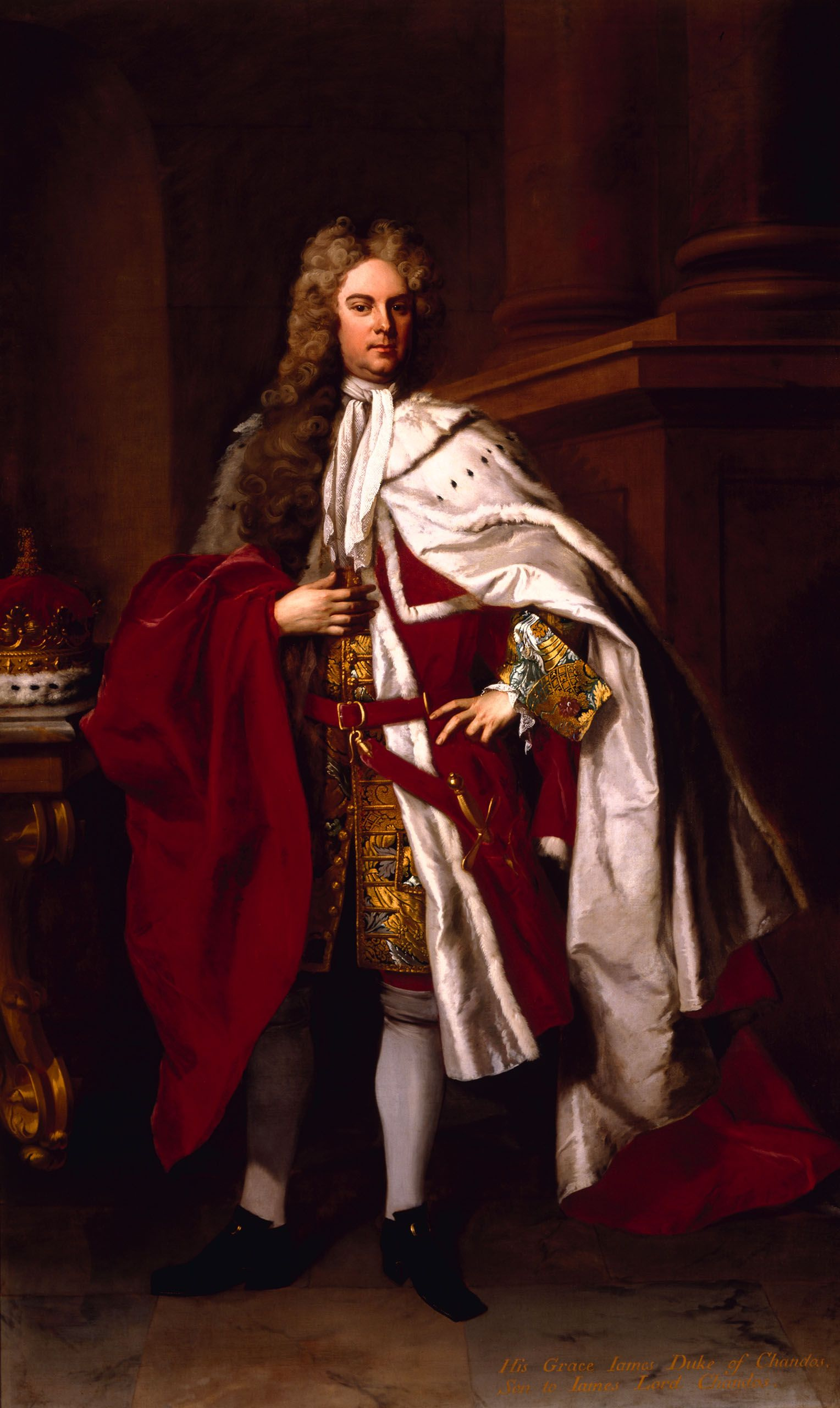
A portrait of James Brydges, 1st Duke of Chandos wearing the robes of the British peerage.

Following the reforms of the emperor Diocletian (which separated the civilian and military administrations of the Roman provinces), a dux became the military commander in each province. The title dux, Hellenised to doux, survived in the Eastern Roman Empire where it continued in several contexts, signifying a rank equivalent to a captain or general. Later on, in the 11th century, the title Megas Doux was introduced for the post of commander-in-chief of the entire navy.

During the Middle Ages, the title (as Herzog) signified first among the Germanic monarchies. Dukes were the rulers of the provinces and the superiors of the counts in the cities and later, in the feudal monarchies, the highest-ranking peers of the king. A duke may or may not be, ipso facto, a member of the nation's peerage: in the United Kingdom and Spain, all dukes are/were also peers of the realm, in France, some were and some were not, while the term is not applicable to dukedoms of other nations, even where an institution similar to the peerage (e.g. Grandeeship, Imperial Diet, Hungarian House of Magnates) existed.

During the 19th century, many of the smaller German and Italian states were ruled by dukes or grand dukes. But at present, with the exception of the Grand Duchy of Luxembourg, there are no dukes ruling as monarchs. Duke remains the highest hereditary title (aside from titles borne by a reigning or formerly reigning dynasty) in Portugal (though now a republic), Spain, and the United Kingdom. In Sweden, members of the royal family are given a personal dukedom at birth. The Pope, as a temporal sovereign, has also, though rarely, granted the title of duke or duchess to persons for services to the Holy See. In some realms the relative status of "duke" and "prince", as titles borne by the nobility rather than by members of reigning dynasties, varied—e.g., in Italy and Germany.

A woman who holds in her own right the title to such duchy or dukedom, or is married to a duke, is normally styled duchess. Queen Elizabeth II, however, was known by tradition as Duke of Normandy in the Channel Islands and Duke of Lancaster in Lancashire.

== Duchy and dukedom ==
A duchy is the territory or geopolitical entity ruled by a duke, whereas his title or area is often called a dukedom. The Grand Duchy of Luxembourg is a fully independent state and its head, the Grand Duke, is a sovereign monarch reigning over his Luxembourgish subjects.

The Duke of Cornwall holds both the dukedom (title) and duchy (estate holdings), the latter being the source of his personal income; those living on the ducal estates are subjects of the British sovereign and owe neither fealty nor services to the duke per se. In Scotland, the male heir apparent to the British crown is always the Duke of Rothesay as well, but this is a dukedom (title) without a duchy. Similarly, the British monarch rules and owns the Duchy of Lancaster as Duke of Lancaster, but it is held separately from the Crown, with the income of the duchy estates providing the sovereign's Privy Purse.

The Channel Islands are two of the three remaining Crown Dependencies, the last vestiges of the lands of the Duchy of Normandy. The Islanders in their loyal toast will say "Le Roi, notre Duc" (The King, Our Duke). Though the title was apparently renounced under the Treaty of Paris in 1259, the Crown still maintains that the title is retained: "In 1106, William's youngest son Henry I seized the Duchy of Normandy from his brother Robert; since that time, the English sovereign has always held the title Duke of Normandy", and that "By 1205, England had lost most of its French lands, including Normandy. However, the Channel Islands, part of the lost Duchy, remained a self-governing possession of the English Crown. While the islands today retain autonomy in government, they owe allegiance to The King in his role as Duke of Normandy."

== Middle Ages ==
During the Middle Ages, after Roman power in Western Europe collapsed, the title was still employed in the Germanic kingdoms, usually to refer to the rulers of old Roman provinces.

=== Albania ===
The Venetians installed a "Duke of Durazzo" (today Durrës) during their brief rule over the city and its environs in 1205–1213.

In 1332, Robert of Taranto succeeded his father, Philip. Robert's uncle, John, did not wish to do him homage for the Principality of Achaea, so Robert received Achaea from John in exchange for 5,000 ounces of gold and the rights to the diminished Kingdom of Albania. John took the style of Duke of Durazzo.

In 1368, Durazzo fell to Karl Thopia, who was recognized by Venice as Prince of Albania.

=== Visigoths ===
The Visigoths retained the Roman divisions of their kingdom in the Iberian Peninsula and it seems that dukes ruled over these areas. They were the most powerful landowners and, along with the bishops, elected the king, usually from their own midst. They were the military commanders and in this capacity often acted independently from the king, most notably in the latter period before the Muslim invasions.

The army was structured decimally with the highest unit, the thiufa, probably corresponding to about 1,000 people from each civitas (city district). The cities were commanded by counts, who were in turn answerable to the dukes, who called up the thiufae when necessary.

=== Lombards ===
When the Lombards entered Italy, the Latin chroniclers called their war leaders duces in the old fashion. These leaders eventually became the provincial rulers, each with a recognized seat of government. Though nominally loyal to the king, the concept of kingship was new to the Lombards and the dukes were highly independent, especially in central and southern Italy, where the Duke of Spoleto and the Duke of Benevento were de facto sovereigns. In 575, when Cleph died, a period known as the Rule of the Dukes, in which the dukes governed without a king, commenced. It lasted only a decade before the disunited magnates, to defend the kingdom from external attacks, elected a new king and even diminished their own duchies to provide him with a handsome royal demesne.

The Lombard kings were usually drawn from the duke pool when the title was not hereditary. The dukes tried to make their own offices hereditary. Beneath them in the internal structure were the counts and gastalds, a uniquely Lombard title initially referring to judicial functions, similar to a count's, in provincial regions.

=== Franks ===
In the Frankish kingdom, duke was a title given to an official in temporary command over a group of counts, rather than over a fixed region. Their functions were primarily military, and they led armed forces in times of war. Although their principal duties were military, dukes occasionally supervised counts, served in a judicial capacity, and acted as ambassadors. Unlike in Roman times, dukes were ultimately considered superior in rank to counts. Dukes were typically Frankish, whereas counts were often Gallo-Roman. Dukes met with the king every May to discuss policy for the upcoming year, in what was known as the Mayfield.

In Burgundy and Provence, the titles of patrician and prefect were commonly employed instead of duke, probably for historical reasons relating to the greater Romanization of those provinces. But the titles were basically equivalent.

In late Merovingian Gaul, the mayors of the palace of the Arnulfing clan began to use the title dux et princeps Francorum: 'duke and prince of the Franks'. In this title, duke implied supreme military control of the entire nation (Francorum, the Franks) and it was thus used until the end of the Carolingian dynasty in France in 987.

=== Holy Roman Empire ===
==== Stem duchies ====
The stem duchies were the constituent duchies of the Kingdom of Germany at the time of the extinction of the Carolingian dynasty (the death of Louis the Child in 911) and the transitional period leading to the formation of the Holy Roman Empire later in the 10th century.

=== England ===
==== Anglo-Saxon times ====
In Anglo-Saxon England, where the Roman political divisions were largely abandoned, the highest political rank beneath that of king was ealdorman, and the first ealdormen were referred to as duces (the plural of the original Latin dux) in the chronicles. The title ealdorman was replaced by the Danish eorl (later earl) over time. After the Norman conquest, their power and regional jurisdiction was limited to that of the Norman counts.

==== Late medieval times ====
Edward III of England created the first English dukedom by naming his eldest son Edward, the Black Prince, as Duke of Cornwall in 1337. Upon the death of the Black Prince, the duchy of Cornwall passed to his nine-year-old son, who would eventually succeed his grandfather as Richard II.

The title of Duke of Lancaster was created by Edward III in 1351 for Henry of Grosmont, but became extinct upon the duke's death in 1361. The following year, Edward III bestowed the title (2nd creation) on his fourth son, John of Gaunt, who was also married to the first duke's daughter. On the same day Edward III also created his second son, Lionel of Antwerp, as Duke of Clarence.

All five of Edward III's surviving sons eventually became dukes. In 1385, ten years after their father's death, his heir Richard II created dukedoms for his last two uncles on the same day. Thomas of Woodstock was named Duke of Gloucester and Edmund of Langley became Duke of York, thereby founding the House of York, which later fought for the throne with John of Gaunt's Lancastrian descendants during the Wars of the Roses.

By 1483, a total of 16 ducal titles had been created: Cornwall, Lancaster, Clarence, Gloucester, York, Ireland, Hereford, Aumale, Exeter, Surrey, Norfolk, Bedford, Somerset, Buckingham, Warwick and Suffolk. Some became extinct, others had multiple creations, and some had merged with the crown upon the holder's accession to the throne. When the Plantagenet dynasty came to an end at the Battle of Bosworth Field on 22 August 1485, only four ducal titles remained extant, of which two were now permanently associated with the crown. John de la Pole was Duke of Suffolk and John Howard was Duke of Norfolk (2nd creation), while the duchy of Cornwall was reserved as a title and source of income for the eldest son of the sovereign, and the duchy of Lancaster was now held by the monarch.

Norfolk perished alongside Richard III at Bosworth field, and the title was forfeit. It was restored to his son Thomas thirty years later by Henry VIII, as one of a number of dukes created or recreated by the Tudor dynasty over the ensuing century. England's premier ducal title, Norfolk, remains in the Howard family to this day.

== Modern age ==
A Duke's coronet (United Kingdom), as used in heraldry

In the 19th century, the sovereign dukes of Parma and Modena in Italy, and of Anhalt, Brunswick-Lüneburg, Nassau, Saxe-Coburg-Gotha, Saxe-Meiningen and Saxe-Altenburg in Germany survived Napoleon's reorganization.

Since the unification of Italy in 1870 and the end of monarchy in Germany and Austria in 1918, there have no longer been any reigning dukes in Europe; Luxembourg is ruled by a grand duke, a higher title, just below king.

In the United Kingdom, the inherited position of a duke along with its dignities, privileges, and rights is a dukedom. However, the title of duke has never been associated with independent rule in the British Isles: they hold dukedoms, not duchies (excepting the Duchy of Cornwall and the Duchy of Lancaster). Dukes in the United Kingdom are addressed as "Your Grace" and referred to as "His Grace". Currently, there are thirty-five dukedoms in the Peerage of England, Peerage of Scotland, Peerage of Great Britain, Peerage of Ireland and Peerage of the United Kingdom, held by thirty different people, as three people hold two dukedoms and two hold three (see List of dukes in the peerages of Britain and Ireland).

All dukedoms in the UK apart from the Dukedom of Lancaster and the Dukedom of Edinburgh, which is held for life by the current duke, are inherited through the male line only, although dukedoms such as Marlborough and Fife (second creation) have passed through the female line for one generation under terms of a special remainder for lack of male heirs of the initial grantee. Henrietta, 2nd Duchess of Marlborough and Her Highness Princess Alexandra (HRH Princess Arthur of Connaught), 2nd Duchess of Fife were duchesses in their own right. Both were succeeded in their titles by nephews born by younger sisters of the duchesses. The word duchess is normally only used for the wife of a duke.

Dukes of Lancaster are called dukes even when they are female, and by tradition the monarch of the UK, whether male or female, is known in the Channel Islands as the Duke of Normandy.

== Royal dukes ==
Various royal houses traditionally awarded titles of nobility (mainly dukedoms) to the sons, and in some cases daughters, of their sovereigns; others include at least one dukedom in a wider list of similarly granted titles, nominal dukedoms without any actual authority, often even without an estate. Such titles are still conferred on royal princes or princesses in the current European monarchies of Belgium, Spain, Sweden and the United Kingdom.

Other historical cases occurred for example in Denmark, Finland (as a part of Sweden) and France, Portugal and some former colonial possessions such as Brazil and Haiti.

=== United Kingdom ===
In the United Kingdom, a royal duke is a duke who is a member of the British royal family, entitled to the style of "His Royal Highness". Ducal titles which have been given within the royal family include Duke of Cornwall, Duke of Lancaster, Duke of Clarence, Duke of York, Duke of Gloucester, Duke of Bedford, Duke of Cumberland, Duke of Cambridge, Duke of Rothesay, Duke of Albany, Duke of Ross, Duke of Edinburgh, Duke of Kent, Duke of Sussex, and Duke of Connaught and Strathearn. Following his abdication in 1936 the former King Edward VIII was given the title Duke of Windsor.

There are also non-royal dukedoms in the United Kingdom.

=== Belgium ===
In Belgium, the title of Duke of Brabant (historically the most prestigious in the Low Countries, and containing the federal capital Brussels) is awarded to the heir apparent of the monarch, other dynasts receiving various lower historical titles (much older than Belgium, and in principle never fallen to the Belgian crown), such as Count of Flanders (King Leopold III's so-titled brother Charles held the title when he became the realm's temporary head of state as prince-regent) and Prince of Liège (a secularised version of the historical prince-bishopric; e.g. King Albert II until he succeeded his older brother Baudouin I).

=== Iberian peninsula ===
When the Christian Reconquista, sweeping the Moors from the former Caliphate of Córdoba and its taifa-remnants, transformed the territory of former Suevic and Visigothic realms into Catholic feudal principalities, none of these warlords was exactly styled duke. A few (as Portugal itself) started as count (even if the title of dux was sometimes added), but soon all politically relevant princes came to use the royal style of king.

==== Portugal ====
In Portugal, the title of duke was granted for the first time in 1415 to infante Peter and infante Henry, the second and third sons of king John I, following their participation in the successful Conquest of Ceuta. Pedro became the first Duke of Coimbra and Henry the first Duke of Viseu.

From the reign of king Manuel I, the title of Duke of Beja was given to the second son of the monarch. This was changed during the Liberal regime in the 19th century (with Queen Maria II), when the first infante (second son of the monarch) got the title of Duke of Porto and the second infante (third son) was known as Duke of Beja.

There are examples of duke as a subsidiary title, granted to the most powerful noble houses:

- Duke of Barcelos, to be used by the heir of the Duke of Braganza;
- Duke of Torres Novas, to be used by the heir of the Duke of Aveiro;
- Duke of Miranda do Corvo, to be used by the heir of the Duke of Lafões.

Usually, the title of duke was granted to relatives of the royal family, such as the infantes or natural sons of the monarch. There are exceptions, such as António José de Ávila, who, although not having any relation to the royal family, was given the title of Duke of Ávila and Bolama in the 19th century.

==== Spain ====
Spanish infantes and infantas are usually given a royal dukedom upon marriage, excepting the heir apparent who is the Prince of Asturias. Those titles are nowadays not hereditary but carry a grandeeship of Spain. The current royal duchesses are Infanta Margarita, Duchess of Soria (although she inherited the title of Duchess of Hernani from her cousin and is the second holder of the title), and Infanta Elena, Duchess of Lugo. In Spain all dukes hold the court rank of grandee, which has precedence over all other noble titles.

The last non-royal hereditary dukedom created was the title of Duke of Suárez in favour of former primer minister Adolfo Suárez in 1981. Since the accession of King Felipe VI to the throne in 2014, no new noble title has been created.

=== Nordic countries ===
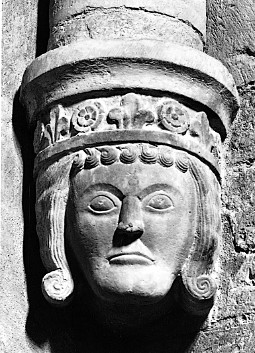
In the 1260s Birger Jarl bore a ducal coronet and used the Latin title of Dux Sweorum (Latin for "Duke of the Swedes"); the design of his coronet combined those used by continental European and English dukes.

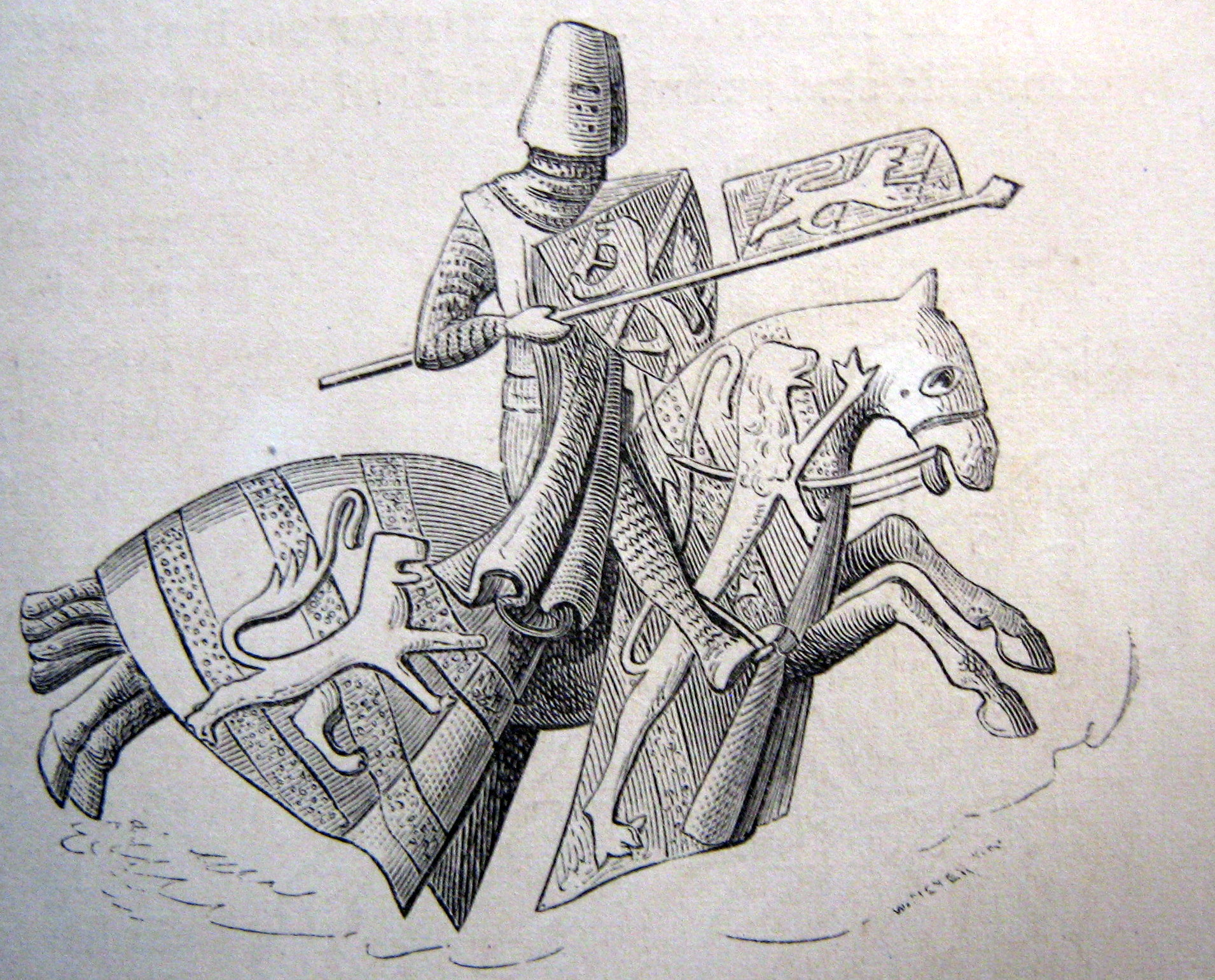
Bishop Bengt Birgersson (1254–1291) was the first Duke of Finland

The Northern European duchies of Halland, Jutland, Lolland, Osilia and Reval existed in the Middle Ages. The longest-surviving duchy was Schleswig, i.e., Sonderjylland (a portion of which later became part of Germany). Its southern neighbor, the duchy of Holstein, in personal union with the Danish crown, was nonetheless always a German principality. The two duchies jointly became a member of the German Bundesland as "Schleswig-Holstein" in the 19th century.

==== Denmark ====
Beginning in the 11th century, Danish kings frequently awarded the title of jarl (earl) or duke of Schleswig to a younger son of the monarch. Short-lived dukedoms were created for the same purpose in Lolland and Halland.

After the accession to the throne of Christian I, a complex system of appanages were created for male-line descendants of the king, being granted non-sovereign ducal titles in both Schleswig and Holstein, e.g. Duke of Gottorp, Duke of Sønderborg, Duke of Augustenborg, Duke of Franzhagen, Duke of Beck, Duke of Glücksburg and Duke of Nordborg. This arrangement occurred in both territories despite Schleswig being a fief of Denmark and Holstein being a fief of the Holy Roman Empire.

==== Finland ====
Key parts of Finland were sometimes under a Duke of Finland during the Swedish reign (until 1809). Some of the provinces are still considered duchies for the purposes of heraldry.

==== Norway ====
In Norway, Skule Bårdsson was first jarl in 1217, and as such got responsibility for the army, and then in 1237, as another attempt at compromise, Skule was given the first Norwegian title of duke (hertug). There is no indication that those two titles meant the same thing, or was mixed. He was first jarl, and then also hertug, but after he became hertug he kept the title jarl.

==== Sweden ====
Sweden has a history of making the sons of its kings ruling princes of vast duchies, but this ceased in 1622. Only one non-royal person was ever given a dukedom.

In 1772, King Gustav III reinstated the appointment of titular dukes but as a non-hereditary title for his brothers. Since then, all Swedish princes have been created dukes of a province at birth. When the 1810 Act of Succession was amended to allow female succession to the throne, King Carl XVI Gustaf's eldest daughter Victoria became Crown Princess (displacing her younger brother Carl Philip) and received the title of Duchess of Västergötland. The practice of conferring ducal titles has since extended to Swedish princesses as well as princes. Currently, there are five dukes and four duchesses in their own right. The territorial designations of these dukedoms refer to ten of the Provinces of Sweden.

== France ==
The highest precedence in the realm, attached to a feudal territory, was given to the twelve original pairies (en: peers), who also had a traditional function in the royal coronation, comparable to the German imperial archoffices.

Half of them were ducal: three ecclesiastical (the six prelates all ranked above the six secular peers of the realm) and three temporal, each time above three counts of the same social estate.

The Prince-Bishops with ducal territories among them were:

- The Archbishop of Reims, styled archevêque-duc pair de France (in Champagne; who crowns and anoints the king, traditionally in his cathedral)
- Two suffragan bishops, styled evêque-duc pair de France :
  - the bishop-duke of Laon (in Picardy; bears the 'Sainte Ampoule' containing the sacred ointment)
  - the bishop-duc de Langres (in Burgundy; bears the scepter)

Later, the Archbishop of Paris was given the title of duc de Saint-Cloud with the dignity of peerage, but it was debated if he was an ecclesiastical peer or merely a bishop holding a lay peerage.

The secular dukes in the peerage of the realm were, again in order of precedence:

- The Duke of Burgundy or duc de Bourgogne (known as Grand duc; not a separate title at that time; just a description of the wealth and real clout of the 15th-century dukes, cousins of the kings of France) (bears the crown, fastens the belt)
- The Duke of Normandy or duc de Normandie (holds the first square banner)
- The Duke of Aquitaine or duc d'Aquitaine or de Guyenne (holds the second square banner)

The theory of the participation of the peers in the coronation was laid down in the late 13th century, when some of the peerage (the Duchy of Normandy and the County of Toulouse) had already been merged in the crown.

At the end of this same century, the king elevated some counties into duchies, a practice that increased up until the Revolution. Many of these duchies were also peerages (the so-called 'new peerages').

== Italy, Germany and Austria ==
In Northern Italy, Germany and Austria the title of "duke" (duca in Italian, and Herzog in German) was quite common. As the Holy Roman Empire (HRE) was until its dissolution a feudal structure, most of its Dukes were actually reigning in their lands. As the titles from the HRE were taken over after its dissolution, or in Northern Italy after their territories became independent of the Empire, both countries also had a share of fully sovereign dukes. Also, in Germany in many ducal families every agnate would bear the ducal title of the family as a courtesy title.

In Northern Italy some important sovereign ducal families were the Visconti and the Sforza, who ruled Milan; the Savoy in Piedmont; the Medici of Florence; the Farnese of Parma and Piacenza; the Cybo-Malaspina of Massa; the Gonzaga of Mantua; the Este of Modena and Ferrara.

In Germany, important ducal families were the Wittelsbachs in Bavaria, the Welfs in Hannover, the ducal family of Cleves, the Wettins in Saxony (with its Ernestine branch divided into several duchies), the Württembergs and the Mecklenburgs. In the German Confederation the Nassaus, the Ascanians of Anhalt, the Welf branch of Brunswick and the Ernestine lines of the Saxon duchies were the sovereign ducal families.

In Austria, "Archduke" was the title borne from 1358 by the Habsburg rulers of the Archduchy of Austria, and later by all senior members of that dynasty.

== Elsewhere in Europe ==
=== Hungary ===
In the Kingdom of Hungary no ducal principalities existed but duchies were often formed for members of the dynasty as appanages. During the rule of the Árpád dynasty dukes held territorial powers, some of them even minted coins, but later this title became more often nominal. These duchies usually were

- the Duchy of Nitra
- the Duchy of Bihar
- the Duchy of Transylvania (consisting of the voivodship of Transylvania and some other counties)

In the Jagiellonian era (1490–1526) only two dukes did not belong to the royal dynasty: John Corvin (the illegitimate son of Matthias Corvinus) and Lőrinc Újlaki (whose father was the titular king of Bosnia), and both bore the title as royal dukes.

After the Battle of Mohács the Habsburg kings rewarded Hungarian aristocrats (like the Esterházys) with princely titles, but they created these titles as Holy Roman Emperors, not as kings of Hungary.

=== Greece ===
The Byzantines retained the title dux, transcribed as δούξ (doux) in Medieval Greek. As in the later Roman Empire, it remained a military office and was not a feudal or hereditary rank. In the 10th century, it was given to the military commanders over several themata (also known as katepano), and in the late 11th century it became used for the governor of a thema.

When the Catholic crusaders overran the Byzantine Empire in the Fourth Crusade, they installed several crusader states (see Frankokratia), some of which were of ducal rank:

- the Duchy of Athens, to which the Duchy of Neopatras was later linked
- the Aegean insular Duchy of Naxos, officially the "Duchy of the Archipelago"
- the Venetian colony of Crete (Candia) was initially ruled by the Duke of Candia

In Italy and other western countries, the later Byzantine appanages of the Palaiologan period were sometimes translated as duchies: the Morea, Mesembria, Selymbria and Thessaloniki. The Greek rank of their holders, however, was that of despotes.

In the independent Kingdom of Greece, the style of Duke of Sparta was instituted in 1868 upon the birth of the future Constantine I as a distinct title for the Crown Prince of Greece.

=== Slavic and nearby countries ===
Generally, confusion reigns whether to translate the usual ruler titles, knyaz/ knez/ książe etc. as Prince (analogous to the German Fürst) or as Duke;

- In splintered Poland petty principalities generally ruled by branches of the earlier Polish Piast dynasty are regarded as duchies in translated titulary. Examples of such: Kujavia, Masovia, Sandomir, Greater Poland and Kalisz as well as various minor duchies, often short-lived or in personal union or merger, named after their capitals, mainly in the regions known as Little Poland and Greater Poland, including (there are often also important Latin or German forms) Kraków, Łęczyca and Sieradz.
- In Pomerelia and Pomerania (inhabited by the Kashubians, different Slavic people from the Poles proper), branches of native ruling dynasties were usually recognized as dukes, quite similarly to the pattern in Poland.
- In Russia, before the imperial unification from Muscovy; sometimes even as vassal, tributary to a Tartar Khan; later, in Peter the Great's autocratic empire, the russification gertsog was used as the Russian rendering of the German ducal title Herzog, especially as (the last) part of the full official style of the Russian Emperor: Gertsog Shlesvig-Golstinskiy, Stormarnskiy, Ditmarsenskiy I Oldenburgskiy I prochaya, I prochaya, i prochaya "Duke of Schleswig-Holstein [see above], Stormarn, Dithmarschen and Oldenburg, and of other lands", in chief of German and Danish territories to which the Tsar was dynastically linked.
- In Bohemia was Duchy of Krumlov, and short-lived Duchy of Reichstadt and Duchy of Friedland.
- In Silesia were many petty duchies as Duchy of Brzeg, Duchy of Legnica, Duchy of Zator and Duchy of Racibórz. They were vassals of King of Bohemia.
- In Lithuania, the approximate equivalent of a duke or prince was called kunigaikštis in the Lithuanian language. Latin translation was dux meaning "duke" in the Middle Ages, whereas Latin for "prince" is princeps. The overall leader of the Lithuanian dukes (Lith. plural: kunigaikščiai) was the grand duke (Lith.: didysis kunigaikštis, Latin: magnus dux), who acted as the monarch of the Grand Duchy of Lithuania until 1795 when Russians took over the land.

=== Netherlands ===
After Belgium and the Netherlands separated in 1830, the title of duke no longer existed in the Netherlands. There is, however, one exception; the title Hertog van Limburg (Duke of Limburg) still exists. This title, however, is an exclusive title for the head of state (the monarch, i.e., the king or queen of the Netherlands).

=== Georgia ===
In Georgia, the title of eristavi is equivalent to duke. The word means "head of the nation" or "head of the army". A duke ruled a duchy (saeristavo); a duke of two or more duchies was called eristavt-eristavi, duke of dukes.

In the 6th to 9th centuries, Iberia was ruled by Erismtavari, a title similar to grand duke. Erismtavari was the first among equal dukes.

Georgians use the title eristavi only for Georgian dukes. When talking about foreign dukes, they use the German word Herzog, which is the German equivalent of "duke".

In the late 15th and early 16th century, the kingdom of Georgia collapsed and most of the western Georgian dukes became princes. In the 19th century the title of eristavi was abolished by the Russian conquerors and the former dukes took the word Eristavi as their last names.

== Post-colonial non-European states ==
=== Empire of Brazil ===
In the Empire of Brazil duke was the highest rank for people born outside the imperial house and only three dukedoms were created. Two of these titles were for relatives of Emperor Pedro I: an illegitimate daughter and a brother-in-law who received the title when married to Pedro I's daughter Maria II. The third, given to Luís Alves de Lima e Silva, was the only dukedom created during the reign of Pedro II. None of these titles were hereditary, just like every other title in the Brazilian nobility system.

=== Haiti ===
The royal Christophe dynasty created eight hereditary dukedoms, in rank directly below the nominal princes. They were short-lived and only recognized in the country.

== Analogues ==
Like other major Western noble titles, Duke is sometimes used to render (translate) certain titles in non-western languages. "Duke" is used even though those titles are generally etymologically and often historically unrelated and thus hard to compare. However, they are considered roughly equivalent, especially in hierarchic aristocracies such as feudal Japan, useful as an indication of relative rank.

=== Indian Subcontinent ===
The Indian feudal system cannot be fully translated to its European counterparts. The closest equivalent to the title of Sovereign Duke is Rao and Nawab to a feudal duchy, a large jagir. Thus, a Rao (in the ruling system) or a Jagirdar, Deshmukh, Patil, and Zamindar (in a feudal way) are closely equivalent to a Duke.

=== Turkey, Afghanistan and Iran ===
Duke in Turkey, Afghanistan, and Iran after Mongolian war against them, was added as generals and kings of districts or states. In the Kingdom of Persians and Ottomans, the systems cannot be fully translated to its European counterparts so they called those generals and kings as Khan, a Mongolian royal and noble rank from the Turco-Mongol word for "lord", analogous to Duke. After revolutions and the falling Empire system in those countries (changing the ruling system to democratic and republic systems), those Khans and the other equal ranks titles added to the titleholder's surnames, and the ranking system, as usual, was disqualified as an official ranking.

=== China ===
During the era of fengjian in Ancient China (Western Zhou, Spring and Autumn period and the Warring States period), the title of gōng (公; sometimes translated as "Duke", sometimes as "Lord") was sparingly granted. Under the principle of "Three Deferences and Two Royal Descendants" (三恪二王後), the three former royal houses were granted the title of gōng; however, not all scholars recognize such a tradition in the Western Zhou dynasty. For that dynasty, this would be the descendants of the Xia dynasty and Shang dynasty; their dukedoms were respectively Qi (杞) and Song (宋). According to tradition, these states were considered the king's guests rather than subjects. However, recent scholarship has identified multiple other meanings for gōng, including the patriarch of a lineage, a non-inheritable title signifying a very broad and senior position within the court, or a respectful appellation for any regional ruler or deceased ancestor.

In works like Mencius and others that date to the Warring States period, gōng was interpreted as the highest in the "five ranks of nobles" (五等爵) attributed to the Western Zhou dynasty. However, the title was not in use until the end of the Western Han, granted to the descendants of the Shang and Zhou royal houses and the eventual usurper Wang Mang. It was also granted to Cao Cao. The title during the Han was inferior to that of prince (諸侯王), which was only available to imperial princes. The "five ranks of nobles" were implemented as such during the Jin dynasty (晉朝). During the Southern dynasties, usurpers typically sought the title of duke, then prince, before compelling the monarch to abdicate.

The Duke of Yansheng noble title was granted to the descendants of Confucius. In 1935, the Nationalist Government changed the title to Sacrificial Official to Confucius (大成至聖先師奉祀官), which still exists as a hereditary office of the Republic of China.

The title gōng and others were also awarded, sometimes posthumously, during the imperial period of Chinese history to recognize distinguished civil and military officials. These could include a taxable base for the official, or could be purely honorary. For example, Emperor Lizong of Song granted the posthumous title Duke of Hui (徽國公) to the Neo-Confucian thinker Zhu Xi.

=== Indonesia ===
The Javanese kingdom of Majapahit, which dominated eastern Java in the 14th and 15th centuries, was divided into nagara (provinces). The administration of these nagara was entrusted to members of the royal family, who bore the title of Bhre—i.e., Bhra I, "lord of" (the word bhra being akin to the Thai Phra), followed by the name of the land they were entrusted with: for example, a sister of the king Hayam Wuruk (r. 1350–1389) was "Bhre Lasem", "lady of Lasem". This system was similar to the Apanage system in Western Europe.

Sultan Agung, king of Mataram in Central Java (r. 1613–1645), would entrust the administration of territories he gradually conquered all over the island of Java, to officials bearing the title of Adipati, this title is hereditary. Such territories were called Kadipaten. Prior to the unification of Java by Sultan Agung, independent kadipatens also exist, e.g. the Duchy of Surabaya which was conquered by Agung in 1625.

The VOC (Dutch East Indies Company), while gradually taking control of Javanese territory, would maintain the existing Mataram administrative structure. Adipati were called "regenten" in Dutch, and the territories they administered, "regentschappen".

In the 19th century, the Javanese term for 'regent' was bupati. French traveller Gérard Louis Domeny de Rienzi mentions bapati.

The bupati have been maintained in the modern Indonesian administrative subdivision structure, heading a kabupaten, the subdivision of a provinsi or province.

The word Adipati is still found in the official title of the hereditary dukes Mangkunegara of Surakarta and Paku Alam of Yogyakarta—i.e., Kanjeng Gusti Pangeran Adipati Arya (shortened into KGPAA).

=== Nigeria ===
In the Kingdom of Benin, a viceroyal chieftain that is known as an Enogie in the Edo language is usually referred to as a duke in English. Often a cadet of the dynasty that produces the oba of Benin, the enogie is expected to rule his domain as he sees fit, subject to the approval of the oba.

In Ife, Oyo and the other kingdoms of Nigerian Yorubaland, a viceroyal chieftain is known as a Baale in the Yoruba language. He is barred from wearing a crown as a matter of tradition and is generally seen as the reigning representative of his oba, the monarch who has the right to wear one.

=== Myanmar ===
In Myanmar (Burma), since the Pagan era of 11th century, each and every single one of the royal family received the title of Myosa (also Myoza), literally means chief of town or territory, which is equivalent to the title of Duke. All royals were given the honor to possess at least one territory by the King. They all were mostly called by their possessions. For instance, Burma's last king, King Thibaw was called by his possession, when he was a prince, of a town Thibaw (Hsipaw in Shan State).

== See also ==
- Archduke
- Grand Duke
- Other titles derived from Dux
  - Doge
  - Duce
  - Megas doux
- Duchy
  - Duchies in Sweden
  - Duchy of Amalfi
  - Duchy of Brittany
  - Duchy of Gaeta
  - Duchy of Naples
- Grand Duchy
- Lists of dukes
- List of fictional dukes and duchesses
- The dictionary definition of Duke at Wiktionary
