= Duke of Tancos =

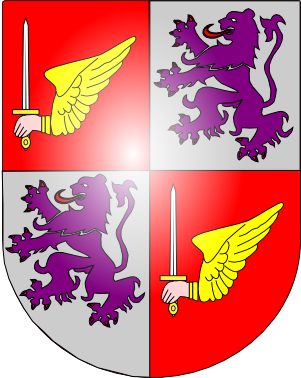
Coat of arms of the dukes of Tancos.

Duke of Tancos (in Portuguese Duque de Tancos) was a Portuguese title of nobility, granted by a royal decree issued by Queen Maria I of Portugal on April 22, 1790, to Constança Manoel, 2nd Marchioness of Tancos and 7th Countess of Atalaia.

The Queen upgraded Dona Constança Manoel to the duchess rank (only during her life), when she became the queen's Chamberlady (Camareira-Môr), the highest palatine office for a lady.

== List of dukes of Tancos ==
1. Constança Manoel, Duchess of Tancos (1700–1791)

== Family name ==
The duke of Tancos family name was Manoel.

The family have their origins in João Manuel, Bishop of Guarda, a natural son of King Duarte I of Portugal with Joana Manoel de Vilhena.

== Other titles ==
- Count of Atalaia, on July 17, 1583, by royal decree of King Philip I of Portugal;
- Marquis of Tancos, on October 22, 1751, by royal decree of King Joseph I of Portugal.

== See also ==
- Marquis of Tancos
- Count of Atalaia
- Dukedoms in Portugal
