= Lists of dukes =

Lists of dukes include:

- List of dukes in the peerages of Britain and Ireland
- List of dukes in Europe
- List of dukes in the nobility of Italy
- List of dukes in the peerage of Spain

== See also ==
- Lists of dukedoms
- Duke (disambiguation) for people and places named Duke
