= Afonso, Duke of Porto =

Portuguese royal and heir (1865–1920)

Infante Afonso
- Duke of Porto; Prince Royal of Portugal
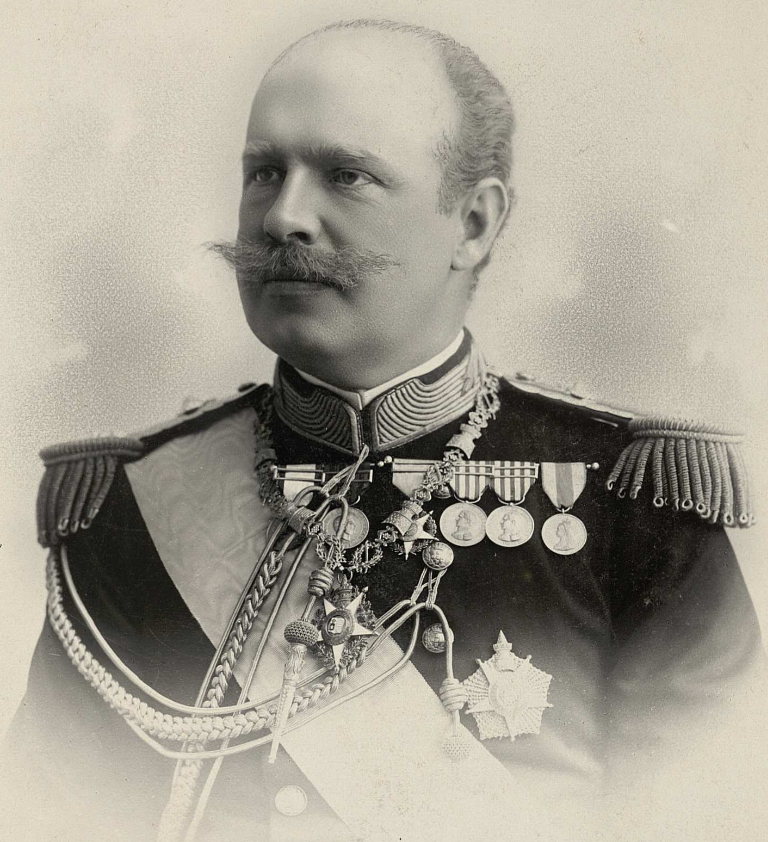
- Photograph c. 1903

Viceroy of the Portuguese State of India
- Tenure: 1896
- Predecessor: Rafael Jácome de Andrade
- Successor: João António das Neves Ferreira
- Born: 31 July 1865; Ajuda Royal Palace, Lisbon, Portugal
- Died: 21 February 1920 (aged 54); Naples, Italy
- Burial: Royal Pantheon of the House of Braganza
- Spouse: Nevada Stoody Hayes (m. 1917)
Names
- Afonso Henrique Maria Luís Pedro de Alcântara Carlos Humberto Amadeu Fernando António Miguel Rafael Gabriel Gonzaga Xavier Francisco de Assis João Augusto Júlio Volfando Inácio
- House: Braganza
- Father: Luis I of Portugal
- Mother: Maria Pia of Savoy

Infante Afonso of Portugal, Duke of Porto (Portuguese pronunciation: [ɐˈfõsu]; 31 July 1865 – 21 February 1920) was a Portuguese Infante of the House of Braganza, the son of King Luis I of Portugal and Maria Pia of Savoy. From 1908 to the abolition of the Portuguese monarchy in 1910, he was the Prince Royal of Portugal as heir presumptive to his nephew, King Manuel II.

== Early life ==
Dom Afonso had a military career. In fact, he was a general of some considerable competence in the Portuguese Army, where, previously, he had been the inspector-general of artillery. His exemplary military background allowed him to be chosen to command military forces at Goa, at the end of the nineteenth century, when he was, concurrently, Viceroy of India. His performance in India motivated his nomination to be Constable of Portugal. In the early months of 1890, his engagement to Archduchess Marie Valerie of Austria was publicised, but later she refused to marry him, under the influence of her aunt by marriage, Archduchess Maria Theresa of Austria, of the Miguelist branch of the Braganza Dynasty.

When threats on the life of his brother, Carlos, became known to him, he adopted the habit of arming himself with a revolver, night and day, making himself ready to defend his family whenever it might be necessary. He urged his nephew, the Prince Royal, Luís Filipe, to carry a weapon as well.

Dom Afonso was a lady's man, known for his kindness, simplicity, and bon-vivant lifestyle. For instance, he liked to act as a fireman with the Ajuda Fire Corps near the Palace of Ajuda, which he patronized as honorary commander-in-chief. He lived at the Palace of Ajuda with the queen mother, Maria Pia of Savoy, after King Luis's death (his brother King Carlos and, later, his nephew King Manuel, both lived at the Palace of Necessidades during their reigns).

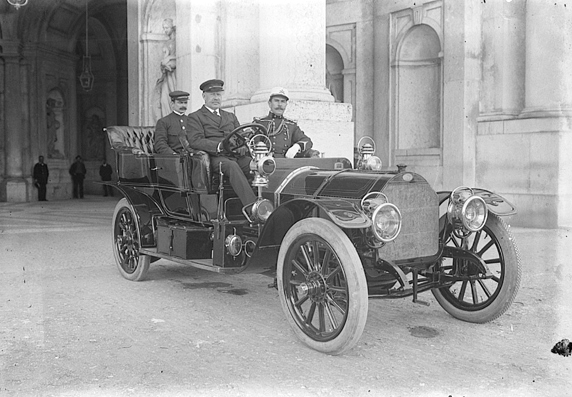
Afonso of Braganza at the steerwheel (late 1900s).

Dom Afonso was also a lover of automobile races, and he was responsible for the first motor races in Portugal, where he was one of the first drivers. After the proclamation of the Portuguese First Republic in 1910, Afonso went into exile abroad, first at Gibraltar with his nephew, the deposed king, Manuel II, and afterwards to Italy with his mother, Queen Maria Pia. He lived with her at Turin, and, after her death, he moved to Rome, and, finally, to Naples.

== Marriage ==
Suffering, like his mother, the dowager Queen Maria Pia of Savoy, from debilitating mental and emotional health after the Regicide of 1908, Afonso de Bragança married civilly in Rome on 26 September 1917, a twice-divorced and once-widowed, American heiress Nevada Stoody Hayes. This was a politically significant event, at least to those Portuguese royalists who clung to the hope of a restoration of the House of Braganza: as significant funding for any power grab was urgently needed.

As of 1917, the Portuguese pretender, Manuel II, was living in England with his wife of four years, Princess Augusta Victoria of Hohenzollern-Sigmaringen, but they had no children. The royalists were apprehensive about the prospects for a legitimate Braganza heir, and their anxiety redoubled at the news of Afonso's marriage to a commoner, especially one of such a dubious reputation.

In Portugal, a morganatic marriage for an infant and infanta was not forbidden, and only the heir of the Portuguese crown, inducted as such, could need the royal consent. So, any legitimate child of Afonso and Nevada could become the lawful heir to the Portuguese throne. Nearly as disturbing was the prospect that both Manuel and Afonso would fail to produce an heir, the claimant to the throne of Portugal could be a descendant of Miguel I, the absolutist king who, in 1834, lost the Portuguese War of the Two Brothers and be barred from the line of succession.

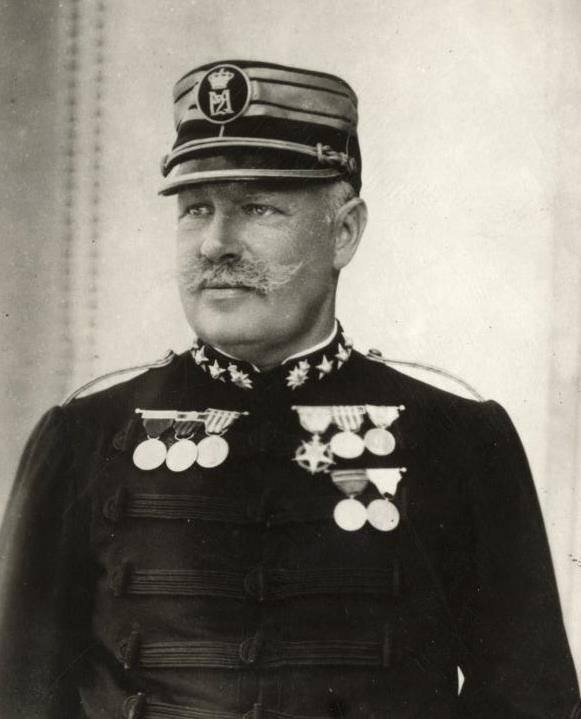
D. Afonso of Braganza

Dom Afonso was the fourth husband of Nevada Stoody Hayes. The latter being a commoner and a divorcee, they were unable to marry religiously in Italy, where the validity of their previous civil marriage in September in Rome, yet registered, has been publicly recused by King Victor Emmanuel III, and in front of some resistance of Pope Benedict XV.

She convinced Afonso to marry her once again in a civil ceremony, performed by a consular officer of the Portuguese Republic: They were thus married for a second time by Dr. Félix de Carvalho, Consul of the Portuguese Legation in Madrid, on 23 November 1917, at the Hotel Ritz Madrid, in the presence of Dr. A. Ferreira d'Almeida Carvalho, first secretary, Dr. Vasco Francisco Caetano de Quevedo Pessanha, second secretary, Major Carlos Maria Pereira dos Santos, military attaché, Francisco Mantero y Velarde, Spanish subject and "capitalist", and Humberto L. Lallement, Portuguese citizen and merchant in Madrid. The same day, a religious wedding ceremony was performed by a priest in a church of Madrid.

Some believe that the Portuguese consul in Madrid was as cooperative as he was because the Republican government in power at Lisbon was delighted to see one of the last of the Braganzas do such an unpopular thing.

Dom Afonso had previously tried to get Manuel II's approval for his marriage, but received no response due to the influence of the rest of the royal family, vehemently opposed to it. After his marriage, he was rejected by his other Italian royal family relatives and his reported allowance of $10,000 per year from King Victor Emmanuel III was cut off. He then began to live in obscurity until his final days. He fell seriously ill and finally died alone, in Naples, on 21 February 1920. Only one Portuguese servant remained with him until the end.

Even though the marriage of an Infante who is specifically heir to the throne (although awaiting the birth of an heir from his wife Queen Augusta Victoria, King Manuel II never officially inducted his uncle Dom Afonso as Prince Royal of Portugal, and with the title of Prince of Beira) would not comply with the specific conditions – i.e. contracted without royal consent, or with royal ban –, and exclude the surviving spouse from inheriting any of the titles or privileges that are the prerogatives of a member of the Portuguese royal family, this do not exclude the widow from inheriting property. In his will, Dom Afonso left his entire estate to his surviving wife Princess Nevada [also called Maria das Neves] of Braganza, Duchess of Porto, aka Dona Nevada de Bragança.

After the death of Manuel II, in July 1932, Dom Afonso's widow demanded that the Portuguese government recognize her rights to a substantial part of the House of Braganza's patrimony. Her husband had named her his sole legal heir in his last will. As the marriage, and the will, was legally disputed in Lisbon, Nevada was briefly arrested shortly after she arrived at Lisbon to claim her inheritance. Eventually, however, she proved a substantial portion of her claim, and she was officially granted the right to remove many objects of art and expensive goods from the Portuguese royal palaces.

The Duchess of Porto traveled from Naples to Portugal with the mortal remains of her late husband, and she arranged for its installation in the Braganza pantheon, located in the Monastery of São Vicente de Fora in Lisbon.

== Honors ==
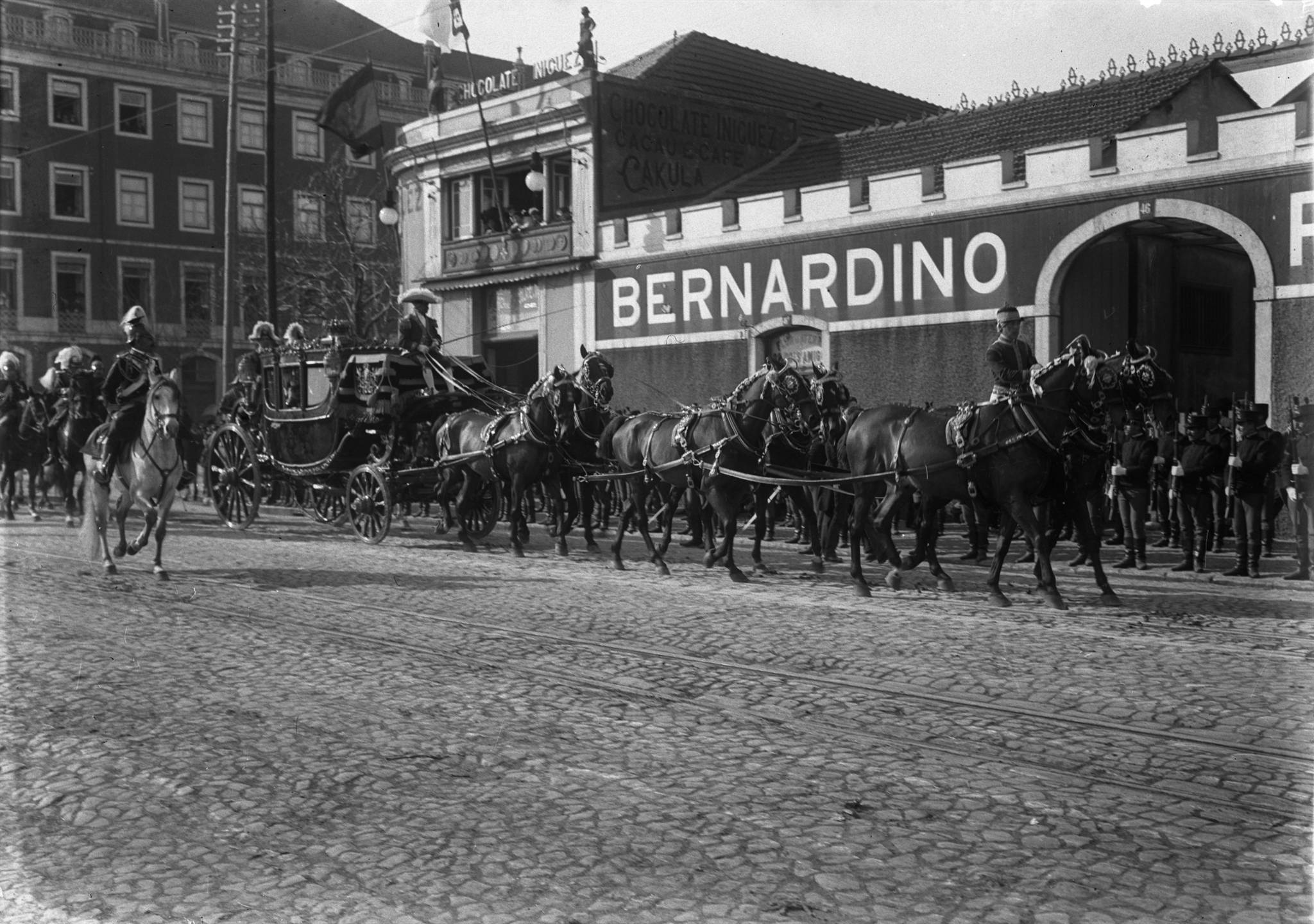
Parade during D. Afonso's Prince Royal swearing-in

He received the following awards:

- Grand Cross of the Sash of the Two Orders (Portugal)
- Grand Cross of the Order of the Immaculate Conception of Vila Viçosa (Portugal)
- Grand Cross of the Order of St. Stephen, 1888 (Austria-Hungary)
- Grand Cross of the Saxe-Ernestine House Order, 1885 (Ernestine duchies)
- Knight of the Annunciation, 15 June 1893 (Italy)
- Knight of the Black Eagle (Prussia)
- Knight of the Rue Crown (Saxony)
- Knight of the Order of the Royal House of Chakri, 23 October 1897 (Siam)
- Knight of the Golden Fleece, 11 December 1883 (Spain)
- Grand Cross of the Order of Charles III, 11 December 1886 (Spain)
- Knight of the Seraphim, 24 December 1883 (Sweden-Norway)
- Honorary Grand Cross of the Royal Victorian Order, 7 April 1903 (United Kingdom)

== Ancestry ==
Ancestors of Afonso, Duke of Porto

8. Prince Ferdinand of Saxe-Coburg and Gotha
4. Ferdinand II of Portugal
9. Princess Maria Antonia Koháry of Csábrág and Szitnya
2. Luís I of Portugal
10. Pedro I of Brazil and IV of Portugal
5. Maria II of Portugal
11. Archduchess Leopoldina of Austria
1. Infante Afonso, Duke of Porto
12. Charles Albert of Sardinia
6. Victor Emmanuel II of Italy
13. Archduchess Maria Theresa of Austria
3. Princess Maria Pia of Savoy
14. Archduke Rainer of Austria
7. Archduchess Adelaide of Austria
15. Princess Elisabeth of Savoy

== See also ==
- Lisbon regicide
- Proclamation of the Portuguese Republic

Afonso, Duke of Porto House of Braganza Cadet branch of the House of Aviz and House of Saxe-Coburg and Gotha Born: 31 July 1865 Died: 21 February 1920
Portuguese royalty
Preceded by Prince Luís Filipe	Prince Royal of Portugal; 1908–1910	Title abolished
Vacant Title last held by King Luís I	Duke of Porto; 1889–1920	Vacant Title next held by Infante Dom Dinis
