= Duke of Ficalho =

19th-century Portuguese title of nobility

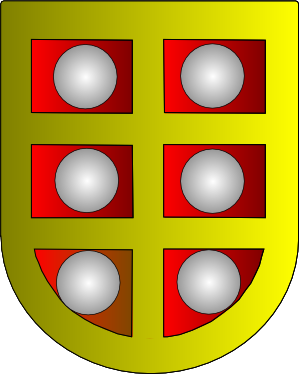
Coat of Arms of the Melo family, used by the Duchess of Ficalho.

Duke of Ficalho (in Portuguese Duque de Ficalho) was a Portuguese title of nobility, granted by a decree issued by Queen Maria II of Portugal on May 14, 1836, to Eugénia de Almeida Portugal, 2nd Countess of Ficalho by marriage.

She was the eldest daughter of the 3rd Marquis of Lavradio.

The Queen elevated Dona Eugénia Almeida Portugal to the title of Marchioness and, in 1836, to Duchess of Ficalho (only during her life), when she became the queen's Maid of Honour (Camareira-Mór), the highest palatine office for a lady.

== List of dukes of Ficalho ==
1. Eugénia Maurícia Tomásia Almeida Portugal, 1st. Duchess of Ficalho (1784–1859)

== Other titles ==
- Count of Ficalho, on April 24, 1789, by royal decree of Queen Maria I of Portugal;
- Marquis of Ficalho, on April 4, 1833, by royal decree of Queen Maria II of Portugal.

== See also ==
- Marquis of Lavradio
- Dukedoms in Portugal
