= Duke of Miranda do Corvo =

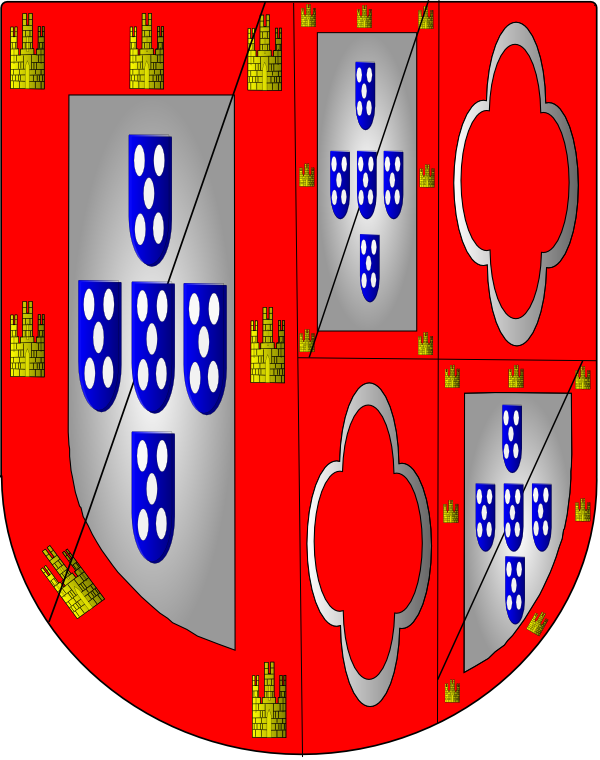
Arms of the dukes of Lafões.

The Dukes of Miranda do Corvo (in Portuguese Duque de Miranda do Corvo) was a Portuguese title of nobility granted by Queen Maria I of Portugal, by a royal decree dated from May 13, 1796, to Dom José João Miguel de Bragança e Ligne, 1st Duke of Miranda do Corvo, who died in 1801, before his father, João Carlos de Bragança e Ligne de Sousa Tavares Mascarenhas da Silva, 2nd Duke of Lafões.

The title of Duke of Miranda do Corvo (originally Count of Miranda do Corvo) was subsidiary to the title of Duke of Lafões, and was used by the House of Lafões heir during his father's life.

== List of dukes ==
1. José João Miguel de Bragança e Ligne de Sousa Tavares Mascarenhas da Silva, 1st Duke of Miranda do Corvo (1795-1801);
2. Afonso de Bragança, 5th Duke of Lafões (1893-1946).

== See also ==
- Duke of Lafões
- Count of Miranda do Corvo
- Dukedoms in Portugal

== Bibliography ==
”Nobreza de Portugal e do Brasil" – Vol. II, pages 747/748. Published by Zairol Lda., Lisbon 1989.
