= Thiufa =

Highest division of the Visigothic army

The thiufa was the highest division of the Visigothic army in Hispania. Based on the known decimal structure of the rest of the army, it seems likely that it was nominally composed of one thousand men. Its commander was called a thiufadus (also tiuphadus).

== Structure ==
It is unknown if the thiufae were ever actually called into service or if they existed only on paper. Perhaps smaller or larger units formed the actual basis of the Visigothic army.

== Etymology ==
The term thiufadus derives from either the Latin devotus or the Germanic thusundifaths. The mechanism of the transmission via the latter is, however, considered impossible by some. The Latin devotus was generally applied by the Ostrogoths and Visigoths to high-ranking Goths in the Gothic language as thiwadus.

== Thiufadus ==
A class of officials called the confiscatores or exactores in the Codex Theodosianus, Lex Salica, and Edictum Chilperici are referred to in the early Visigothic laws of Theudis as compulsares vel executores. In the later Visigothic laws, like the Liber Iudiciorum, they go by various titles: compulsor exercitus, servus dominicus, or thiufadus. The thiufadus was elsewhere called a vassus regis (vassal of the king) and agente in rebus.

The thiufadus, however, was both a military and judicial official. His position is immediately below that of the comes (count) or vicarius (vicar): a position the same as that of the Frankish thunginus or Late Roman ducenarius. Their position in the army was above that of the centenarius (commander of a hundred), but it cannot be positively identified with the position of millenarius (commander of a thousand).

The Liber Iudiciorum augmented the powers of the thiufadi. In their double capacity as general and judge they were assisted by sayos. The thiufadus, who controlled the countryside, seems to have been weaker than the counts who controlled the civitates, city districts.

== Sources ==
- Thompson, E. A. The Goths in Spain. Oxford: Clarendon Press, 1969.
- Contamine, Phillippe. War in the Middle Ages. trans. Michael Jones. Oxford: Basil Blackwell Ltd, 1984.
- Wiener, Leo. Commentary to the Germanic Laws and Medieval Documents. London: Oxford University Press, 1915.
