= Duke of Lafões =

Portuguese dukedom

Ducal House of Lafões
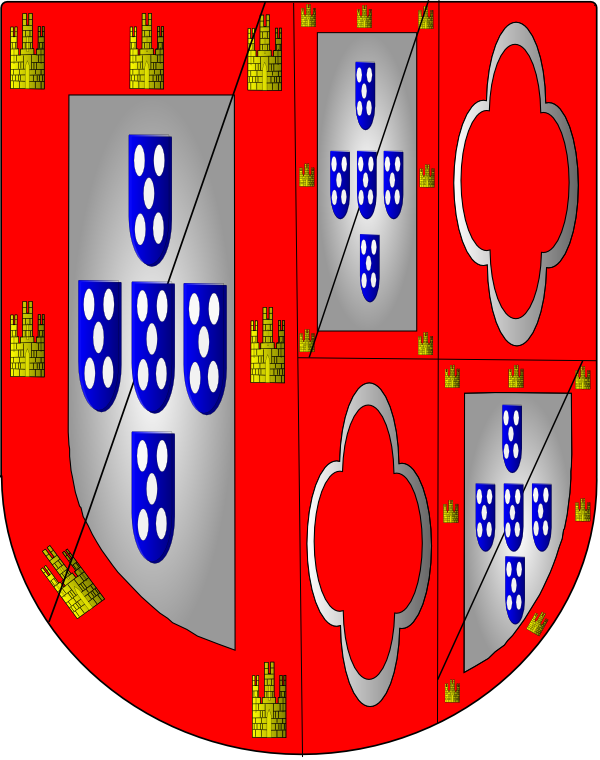
- Parent house: House of Braganza
- Country: Portugal
- Founded: 1718
- Founder: D. Luísa Antónia Inês Casimira de Sousa Nassau e Ligne
- Current head: D. Miguel Bernardo de Casal Ribeiro Bravo de Bragança
- Titles: Duke of Lafões; Duke of Miranda do Corvo; Marquis of Marialva; Marquis of Arronches; Count of Cantanhede; Count of Miranda do Corvo; Lord of Sousa
- Estate: of Portugal

Duke of Lafões (in Portuguese, Duque de Lafões; [ˈdukɨ ðɨ lɐˈfõjʃ]) is a Portuguese title of nobility created under the decree of February 17, 1718, of King John V of Portugal and granted to his nephew, Dom Pedro Henrique de Bragança, the driving force behind Palacio do Grilo and first son of Infante Miguel de Bragança, the latter an illegitimate son of King Peter II of Portugal and Anne Armande Pastre de Verger. Pedro's mother, Luisa Casimira de Sousa Nassau e Ligne was the first to use this title. The title was later passed on to his brother, João Carlos de Bragança e Ligne de Sousa Tavares Mascarenhas da Silva, the most famous Duke of this title.

== List of dukes of Lafões ==
Luísa Casimira de Sousa Nassau e Ligne, Duchess of Lafões (1694–1729), married to Infante Miguel of Braganza (natural son of Peter II, King of Portugal), was the first to use this title. However, she is not included in the list of Dukes, as King John V's decree granted the title to Luísa's older son:

1. D. Luísa Antónia Inês Casimira de Sousa Nassau e Ligne (1694-1729)
2. D. Pedro Henrique de Bragança e Ligne de Sousa Tavares Mascarenhas da Silva (1718-1761)
3. D. João Carlos de Bragança e Ligne Sousa Tavares Mascarenhas da Silva (1719-1806)
4. D. Ana Maria de Bragança e Ligne Sousa Tavares Mascarenhas da Silva (1797-1851)
5. D. Maria Carlota de Bragança e Ligne Sousa Tavares Mascarenhas da Silva (1820-1865)
6. D. Caetano Segismundo de Bragança e Ligne Sousa Tavares Mascarenhas da Silva (1856-1927)
7. D. Afonso de Bragança (1893-1946)
8. D. Lopo de Bragança (1921-2008)
9. D. Afonso Caetano de Barros e Carvalhosa de Bragança (1956-2021)
10. D. Miguel Bernardo de Casal Ribeiro Bravo de Bragança (1982)

== Genealogical summary ==
The House of Lafões descends from the marriage between Infante Miguel of Braganza (King Peter II's natural son) and Luísa-Casimira, 30th representative of the House of Sousa and 6th Countess of Miranda do Corvo.

Peter II (1648–1706); King of Portugal	Charles-Joseph (1661–1713) (m. Mariana Luisa in 1684); Prince of Ligne	Mariana Luisa de Sousa (1672–1743); 2nd Marchioness of Arronches; 5th Countess of Miranda do Corvo
John V (1689–1750); King of Portugal	Miguel of Braganza (1699–1724) (m. Luísa-Casimira in 1715); Infante	Luísa-Casimira de Sousa Nassau e Ligne (1694–1729); Duchess of Lafões; 6th Countess of Miranda do Corvo
Royal House of Portugal	Pedro-Henrique (1718–1761); 1st Duke of Lafões	João-Carlos (1719–1806); 2nd Duke of Lafões
House of Lafões

== See also ==
- Dukes of Miranda do Corvo
- Marquis of Arronches
- Count of Miranda do Corvo
- Dukedoms in Portugal

== Bibliography ==
- ”Nobreza de Portugal e do Brasil" – Vol. III, pages 665/669. Published by Zairol Lda., Lisbon 1989.
- "D.João Carlos de Bragança, 2º Duque de Lafões - Uma Vida Singular no Século das Luzes" - Nuno Gonçalo Monteiro and Fernando Dores Costa. Edições Inapa. 2006
