= Duke of Porto =

Portuguese nobility title

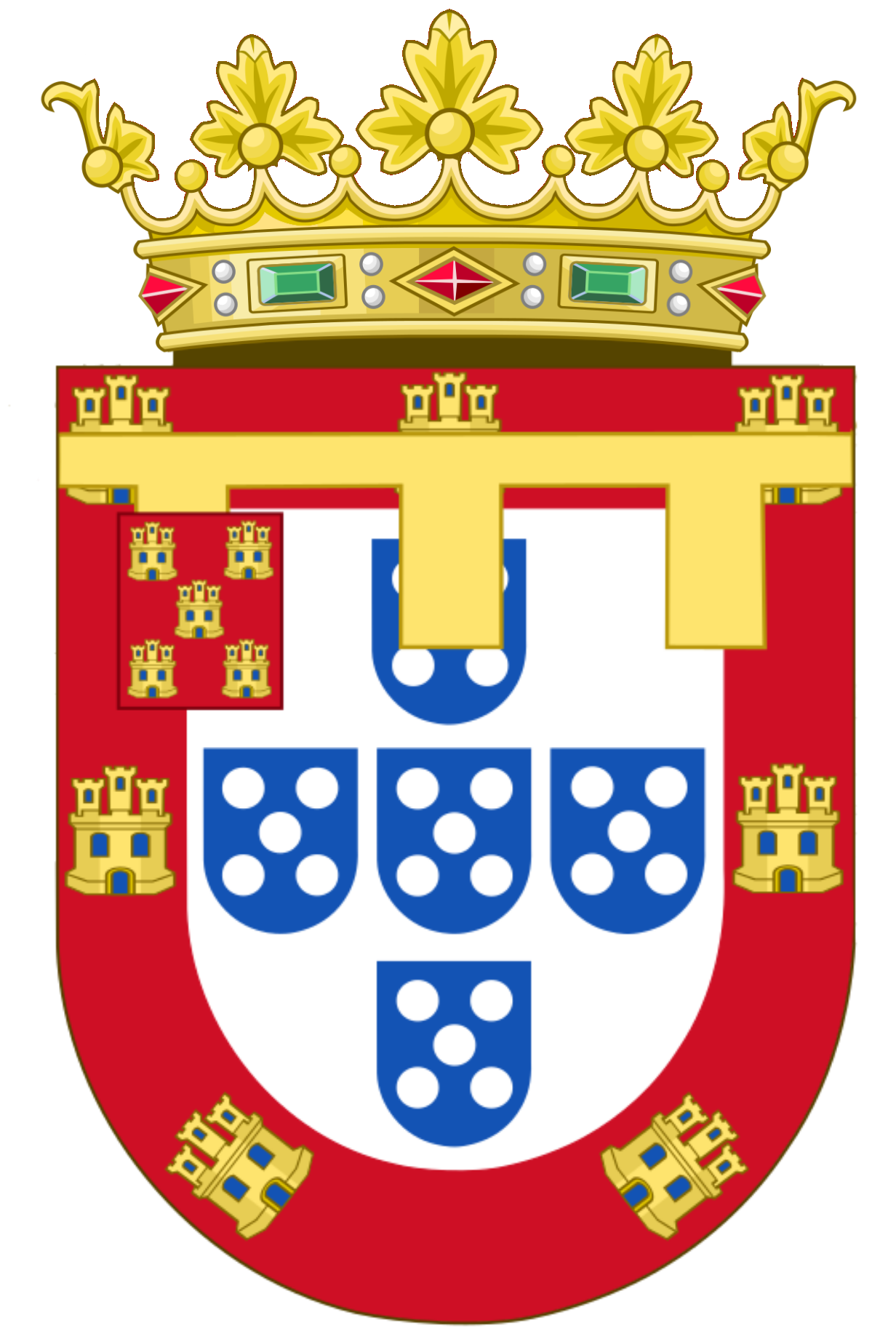
- Creation date: 1833
- Created by: Pedro IV
- Peerage: Peerage of Portugal
- First holder: Maria, Duchess of Porto
- Remainder to: Second male child of the head of the Royal House of Portugal

Duke of Porto (Portuguese Duque do Porto) is a title of Portuguese nobility, held by members of the royal family. It is named for the city of Porto, in the north of Portugal.

== History ==
The title was created in 1833 for Maria, Princess Royal of Portugal by King Pedro IV of Portugal. The title's name was made in honour of the city of Porto, due its loyalty to Pedro IV and Maria II in the Liberal Wars.

Following the use of the title by Maria, Princess Royal of Portugal, the title became associated with the second male child of the head of the Royal House of Portugal.

== List of dukes of Porto ==
Image	Name	Lifespan	Tenure	Monarchical parent
	Infanta Maria da Glória, Duchess of Porto	4 April 1819 – 15 November 1853	4 April 1833 – 31 October 1838	Pedro IV of Portugal
	Infante Luís, Duke of Porto	31 October 1838 – 19 October 1889	31 October 1838 - 31 July 1865	Maria II of Portugal
	Infante Afonso, Duke of Porto	31 July 1865 – 21 February 1920	31 July 1865 – 21 February 1920	Luís I of Portugal

=== Claimed dukes of Porto ===
After the end of the monarchy, the following individuals have claimed the title of Duke of Porto:

Image	Name	Lifespan	Tenure	Monarchical parent
	Infante Dinis, Duke of Porto	25 November 1999 - Present	25 November 1999 - Present	Duarte Pio

== See also ==
- Dukedoms in Portugal
- Portuguese nobility
