= João Carlos de Bragança, 2nd Duke of Lafões =

Portuguese nobleman and politician (1719–1806)

His Excellency The Duke of Lafões GCC
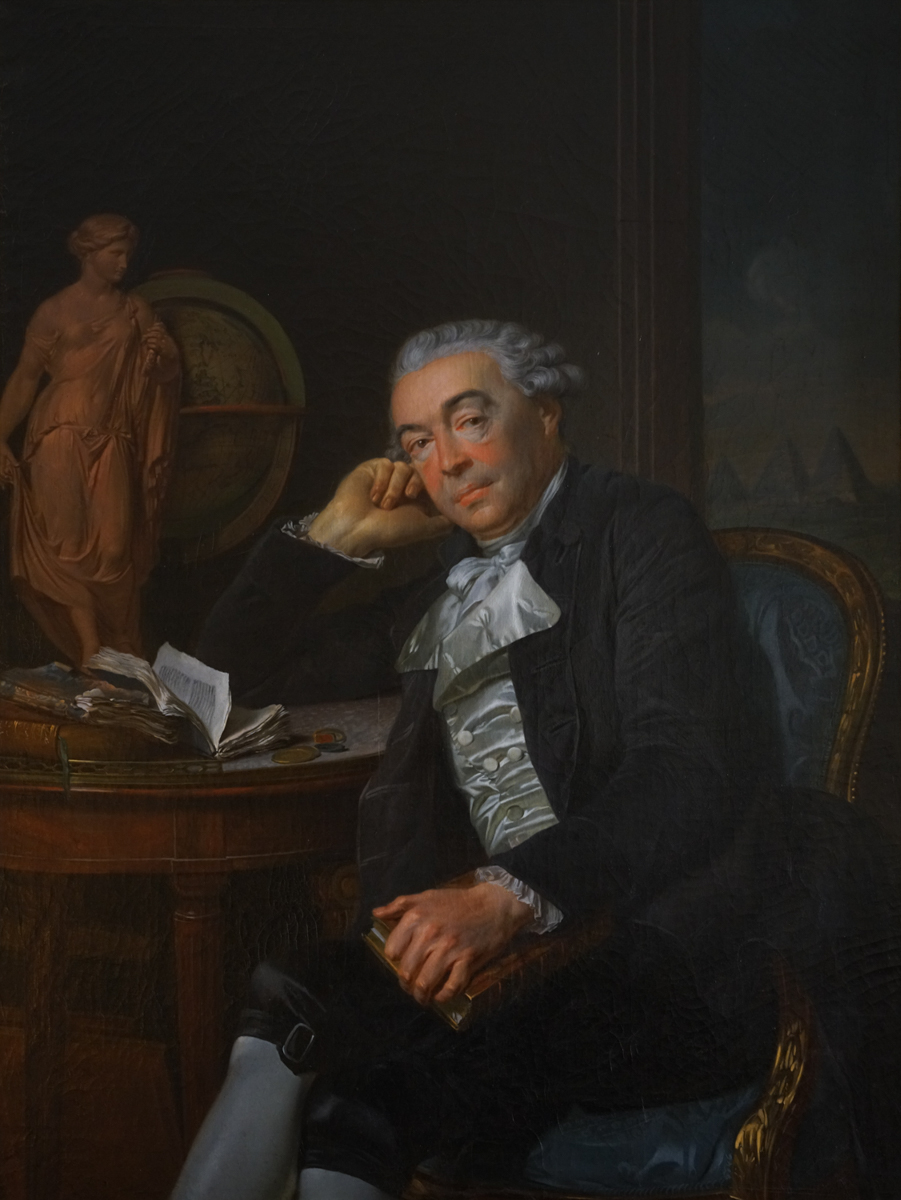
- Portrait by Louis Rolland Trinquesse (Palácio do Grilo)

Minister Assistant to the Dispatch
- In office 6 January 1801 – 21 May 1801
- Monarch: John, Prince Regent

Personal details
- Born: João Carlos de Bragança e Ligne de Sousa Tavares Mascarenhas da Silva; 6 March 1719 Lisbon, Portugal
- Died: 10 November 1806 (aged 87) Lisbon, Portugal

D. João Carlos de Bragança e Ligne de Sousa Tavares Mascarenhas da Silva, 2nd Duke of Lafões, 4th Marquis of Arronches and 8th Count of Miranda do Corvo (6 March 1719 – 10 November 1806) was a Portuguese nobleman and politician. He was the marshal general of the Portuguese Army, which he commanded during the War of the Oranges.

A founding member of the Academia Real das Ciências of Lisbon, he briefly held the office of minister assistant to the dispatch (Prime Minister) of Portugal, between 6 January and 21 May 1801. He was dismissed from office after the entry of the Spanish forces in the Alentejo, although he remained marshal of the army.

== Early life ==
He studied Humanities and Philosophy, having entered the University of Coimbra to pursue a degree in Canon Law, because his uncle King João V had intended him for an ecclesiastical career.

== Adulthood ==
His father was the legitimized son of Pedro II of Portugal. He led the aristocratic opposition to Sebastião José de Carvalho e Melo, 1st Marquis of Pombal. He was a man of culture, and while living in exile during Pombal's tenure assisted both Gluck and Mozart as a patron. After Pombal's fall, the Duque de Lafões became a dominant public figure, holding high public office and founding the Real Academia das Ciências de Lisboa.

He left Portugal in May 1757, heading for London and then, in January 1758, Vienna. He left Portugal with honours of Duke with an unknown purpose, but possibly with the intention of proposing a marriage to the Habsburg emperor Joseph II, with an Infanta of Portugal. He took up residence temporarily in England and was elected a member of the Royal Society.

To reach Vienna, with the Seven Years' War underway, he enlisted in the Austrian army, where Manuel, Count of Ourém, his uncle, as well as brother of King John V, had been general. He was a superior officer of an Infantry Regiment of the Prince of Ligne, his relative, and participated in the war's final campaigns. After the war, in February 1763, he visited Switzerland, Italy, France, and the East, Greece and Egypt. He later visited Prussia and Poland. In 1766, he proposed to rejoin the Austrian army, with the rank of major-general, but the Portuguese crown never authorized him to do so. In 1770, Gluck dedicated his Paride ed Elena to the Duke of Lafões, a specialist on mythology and music.

In 1778, due to the death of King José I and the removal from government of the Marquis of Pombal, Bragança returned to Portugal, accepting the title of Duke of Lafões. In 1779, with the abbot Correia da Serra, he founded the Academy of Sciences of Lisbon which began in his residence at Palacio do Grilo. This was possibly done in honour of his brother, who had proposed it in 1721, at the time of the creation of the Royal Academy of Portuguese History. In 1780, he was appointed to the Board of War, and in 1791 governor of Arms of the Court and province of Extremadura and marshal general on the same date. He became a member of the Order of Christ (Portugal) in 1789. In 1796, he was admitted to the Council of State.

Due to the danger of war with Spain, in January 1801 Bragança was appointed minister assistant to the Prime Minister, and the Secretary of State for War. With the formal declaration of war in March he became head of the Army. He did not want to cede command to the marshal of the Army, Count de Goltz. In May he went to Alentejo, scene of the major military actions of the War of the Oranges. He was in Abrantes, with the Army, when he received the notification that he had been removed from his military and political posts.

== Family tree ==
Family tree of João Carlos de Bragança, 2nd Duke of Lafões

8. John IV of Portugal
4. Peter II of Portugal
9. Luisa de Guzmán
2. Miguel de Bragança, 1st Duke of Lafões
10. Pierre Pastré de Verger, Seigneur de Verger
5. Anne Marie Armande Pastré de Verger
11. Catherine Thérèse Bruchard
1. João Carlos de Bragança e Ligne de Sousa Tavares Mascarenhas da Silva, 2nd Duke of Lafões
12. Claude Lamoral, 3rd Prince de Ligne
6. Charles Joseph de Ligne, 2nd Marquis of Arronches
13. Claire Marie von Nassau-Siegen
3. Luísa Casimira de Sousa Nassau e Ligne
14. Diogo Lopes de Sousa, 4th Count of Miranda
7. Mariana de Sousa Tavares Mascarenhas da Silva, 29th Lady of Casa de Sousa
15. Margarida de Vilhena
