= Count of Miranda do Corvo =

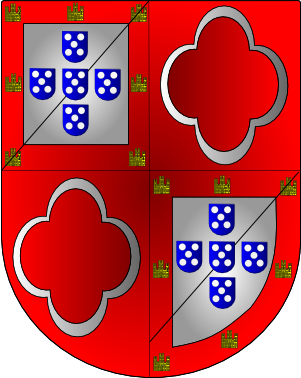
The Coat of Arms of the Sousa (Arronches) family, Counts of Miranda do Corvo and Marquesses of Arronches.

Count of Miranda do Corvo (in Portuguese Conde de Miranda do Corvo) was a Portuguese title of nobility created by a royal decree, dated from 21 March 1611, by King Philip II of Portugal, also known as Philip III of Spain, and granted to Dom Henrique de Sousa Tavares.

Henrique was 26th Lord of the House of Sousa, Lord of Miranda do Corvo and Alcaide (Mayor) of Arronches.

The Prince Regent Pedro, Duke of Beja, on behalf of King Afonso VI of Portugal, granted the new title of Marquis of Arronches (in Portuguese Marquês de Arronches) by a royal decree dated from June 27, 1674 to Henrique de Sousa Tavares, who was already 3rd Count of Miranda do Corvo.

On 13 May 1796, a royal decree issued by Queen Maria I of Portugal, upgraded the title of Count of Miranda do Corvo to Duke of Miranda do Corvo (in Portuguese Duque de Miranda do Corvo), which should be borne by the Duke of Lafões' heir during his father's lifetime.

== List of counts of Miranda do Corvo (1611) and Marquesses of Arronches (1674) ==
- Henrique de Sousa Tavares (c.1550– ? ), 1st Count of Miranda do Corvo;
- Diego Lopes de Sousa (c.1595–1640), 2nd Count of Miranda do Corvo;
- Henrique de Sousa Tavares (1626–1706), 3rd Count of Miranda do Corvo and 1st Marquis of Arronches;
- Diogo Lopes de Sousa (1646–1672), 4th Count of Miranda do Corvo (died before his father and that is why he was not Marquis of Arronches);
- Mariana Luisa Francisca de Sousa Tavares Mascarenhas e Silva (1672–1743), 5th Countess of Miranda do Corvo and 2nd Marchioness of Arronches;
- Luisa Casimira de Sousa Nassau e Ligne (1694–1729), 6th Countess of Miranda do Corvo;
- Pedro Henrique de Bragança (1718–1761), 7th Count of Miranda do Corvo, 3rd Marquis of Arronches and 1st Duke of Lafões.

(for the following Counts/Marquesses see Duke of Lafões)

== See also ==
- List of marquisates in Portugal
- List of countships in Portugal
- Duke of Lafões
- Duke of Miranda do Corvo

== Bibliography ==
”Nobreza de Portugal e do Brasil" – Vol. II, pp. 322/324 and 747/748. Published by Zairol Lda., Lisbon 1989.
