= Pedro Henrique de Bragança e Ligne de Sousa Tavares Mascarenhas da Silva =

Portuguese aristocrat (1718–1761)

Pedro Henrique de Bragança e Ligne de Sousa Tavares Mascarenhas da Silva (19 January 1718 - Granja de Alpriate, 26 June 1761), 1st Duke of Lafões was a Portuguese aristocrat of the 18th century who served as a magistrate in the role of Regent of Justice in the courts of Kings D. John V of Portugal and D. Joseph I of Portugal. He was the driving force and artistic vision behind Palacio do Grilo. He was a pretender to the hand of the future Queen D. Maria I of Portugal, as well as the other uncle of D. Maria I - legitimate descendant of D. John V, D. Pedro III.

== Education ==
D. Pedro Henrique de Bragança was the first born son of Miguel of Braganza and D. Luísa Antonia Casimira de Sousa Nassau e Ligne. In disguise, present at the occasion of the future Duke's baptism was King D. João V, his uncle and godfather. The then Secretary of State, Diogo de Mendonça Corte-Real, declared that in this act His Majesty King D. João V made D. Pedro Henrique de Bragança Duke of Lafões. During his youth, he was interested in Philosophy and Geography, and was educated in history and languages.

== Life and work ==
D. Pedro was a man of a profoundly religious character, and the first place he visited when he arrived from his trips to his farms and villas outside the capital was the Confessionary. He was also the first at church on important occasions. Although the Duke never married, he maintained a relationship with Luísa Clara de Portugal. King D. João V was initially opposed to the relationship, but after the intervention of Friar Gaspar da Encarnação, the King consented on the relationship, from which Ana de Bragança was born. Pedro Henrique de Bragança was one of the main candidates to the hand of D. Maria I - together with Prince Peter III of Portugal.

== Final years ==
D. Pedro became fatally ill a few months after the massive 1755 Lisbon earthquake, possibly due to his involvement in relief efforts. D. Pedro was gravely ill for 4 years before dying in 1761, spending the last year exiled from the court of King Joseph I at his Quinta de Alpriate. The exile resulted as the royal punishment for D. Pedro de Bragança setting out all the candles in the Palace on the occasion of the marriage between King Peter III and Queen Mary I as they rode by in the royal chariot.

== See also ==
- Duke of Lafões
