= Portuguese succession crisis of 1580 =

Succession crisis

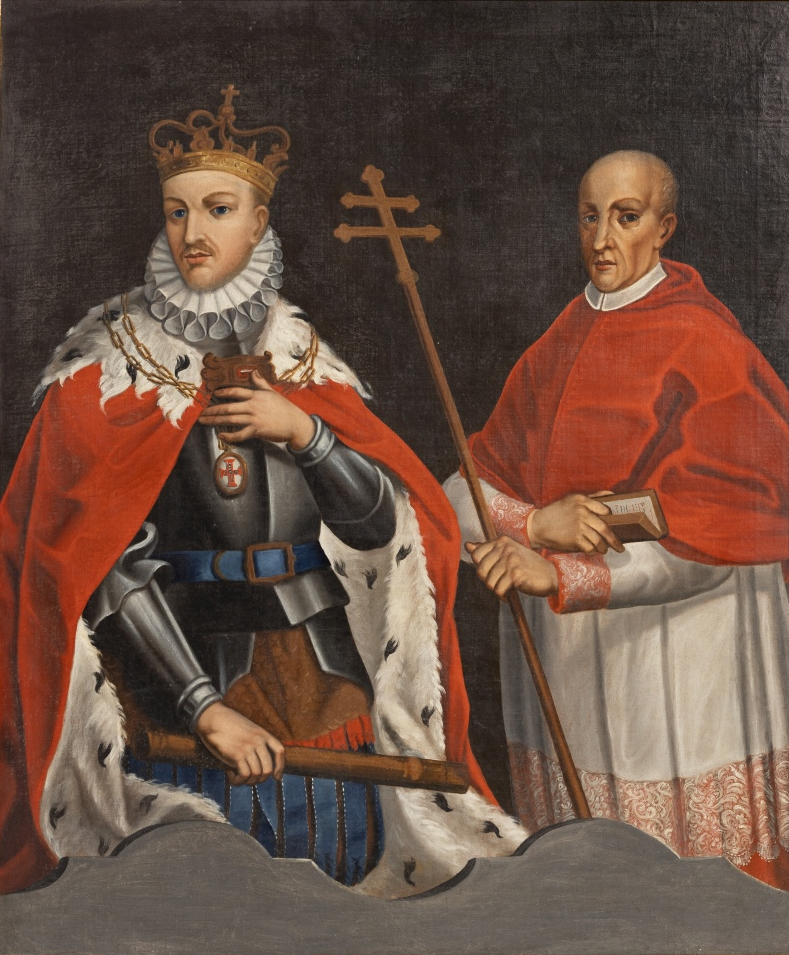
The Portuguese succession crisis was sparked by the death of childless King Sebastian at the Battle of Alcácer Quibir in 1578; his heir presumptive was his great-uncle Cardinal Henry of Portugal, who was bound to clerical celibacy and died two years later without an appointed successor.

A succession crisis emerged in Portugal in 1580 as a result of the disappearance of the young King Sebastian in the Battle of Alcácer Quibir in 1578 and the death of his great-uncle King Henry in 1580. As Sebastian and Henry died childless, a dynastic crisis unfolded, marked by internal conflicts and external contenders vying for the Portuguese throne. Ultimately, King Philip II of Spain succeeded, uniting the Portuguese and Spanish Crowns in the Iberian Union. This personal union endured for 60 years, during which the Portuguese Empire faced decline and global challenges, notably the Dutch–Portuguese War.

== Cardinal-King ==
After the disastrous Battle of Alcácer Quibir in 1578, the Cardinal Henry, Sebastian's grand-uncle, succeeded him as king. (Note: Henry had previously served as regent for the king from 1562 to 1568.) Henry renounced his clerical offices and sought to take a bride for the continuation of the Aviz dynasty, but Pope Gregory XIII, affiliated with Philip II, did not release him from his vows. In January 1580, when the Cortes were assembled in Almeirim to decide upon an heir, the Cardinal-King died and the Regency of the Kingdom was assumed by a Council of five members.

== Claimants to the throne ==
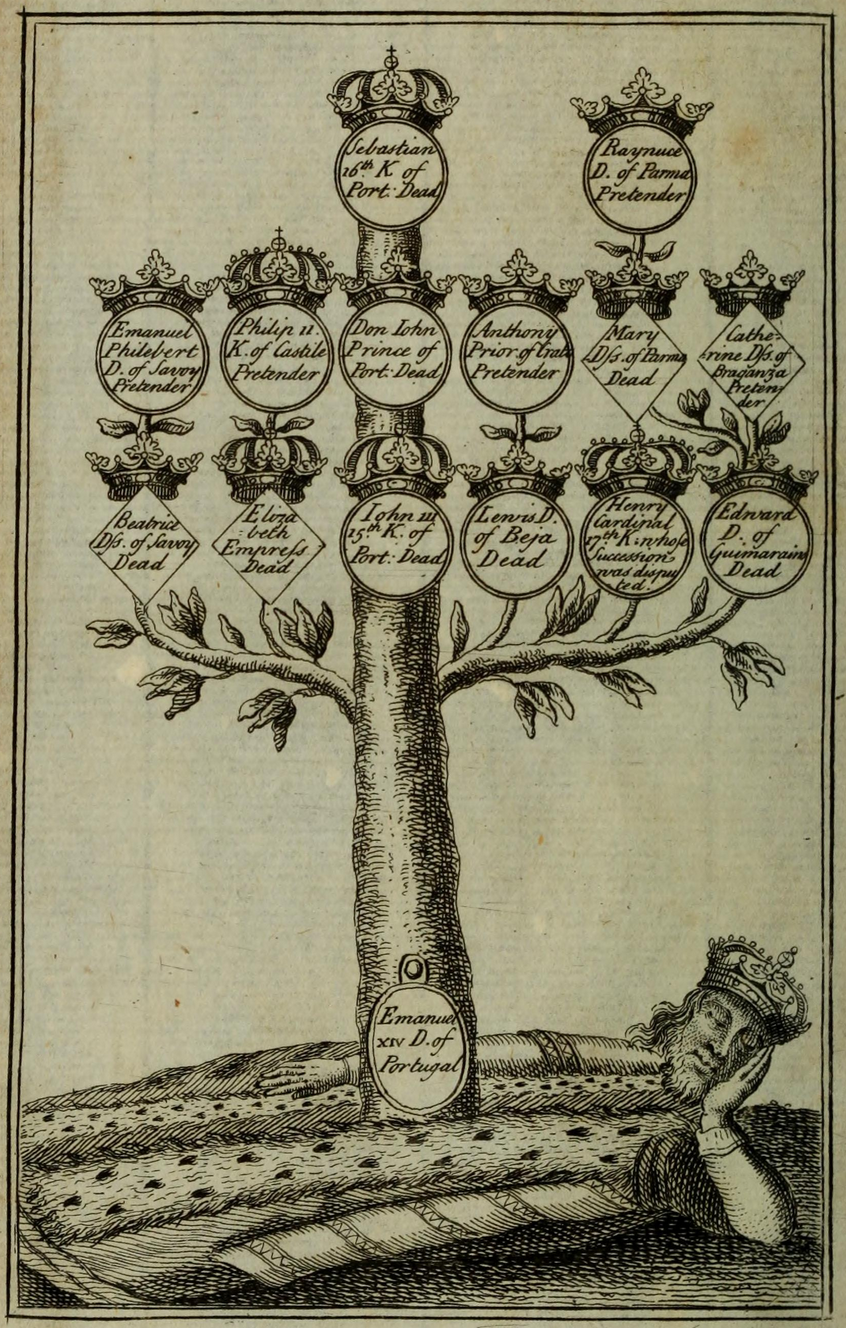
An 18th-century engraving depicting the different claimants' familial relationship through Manuel I of Portugal.

By this time the Portuguese throne was disputed by several claimants. Among them were:

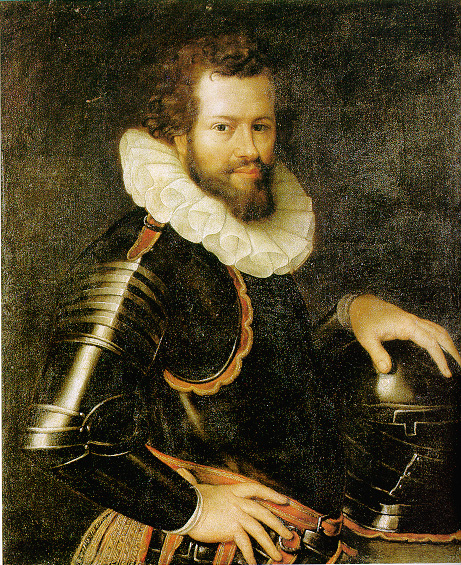
Ranuccio Farnese
Hereditary Duke of Parma

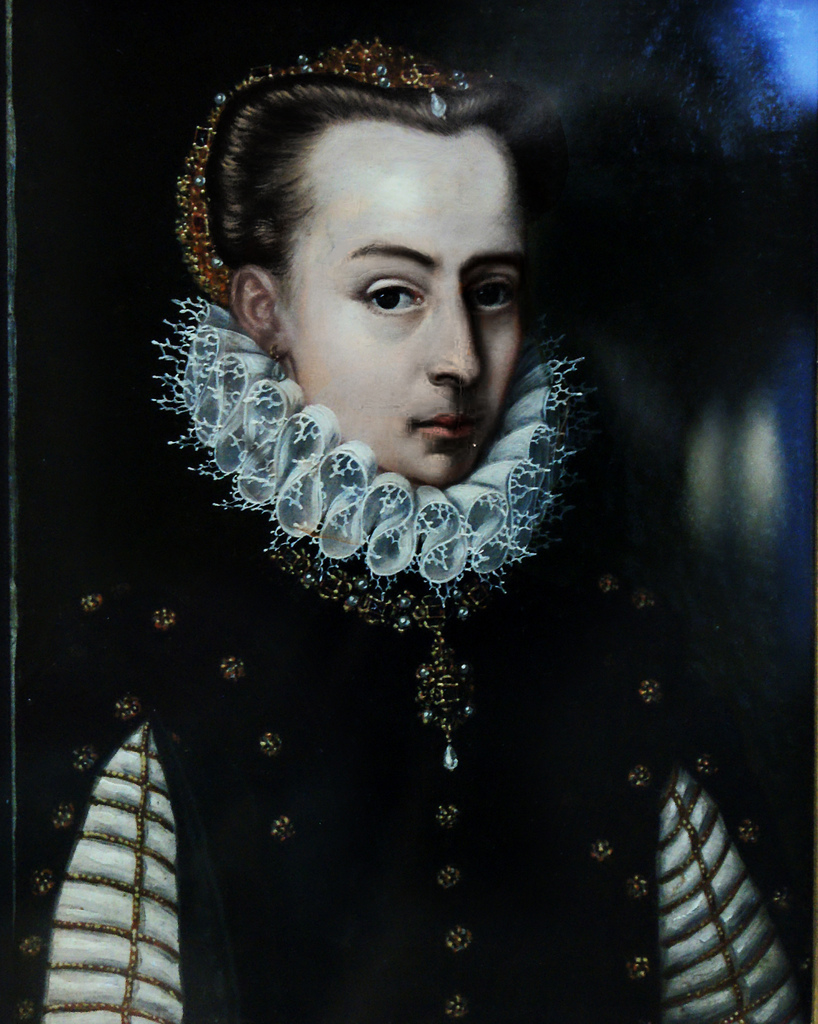
Catherine of Portugal
Duchess of Braganza

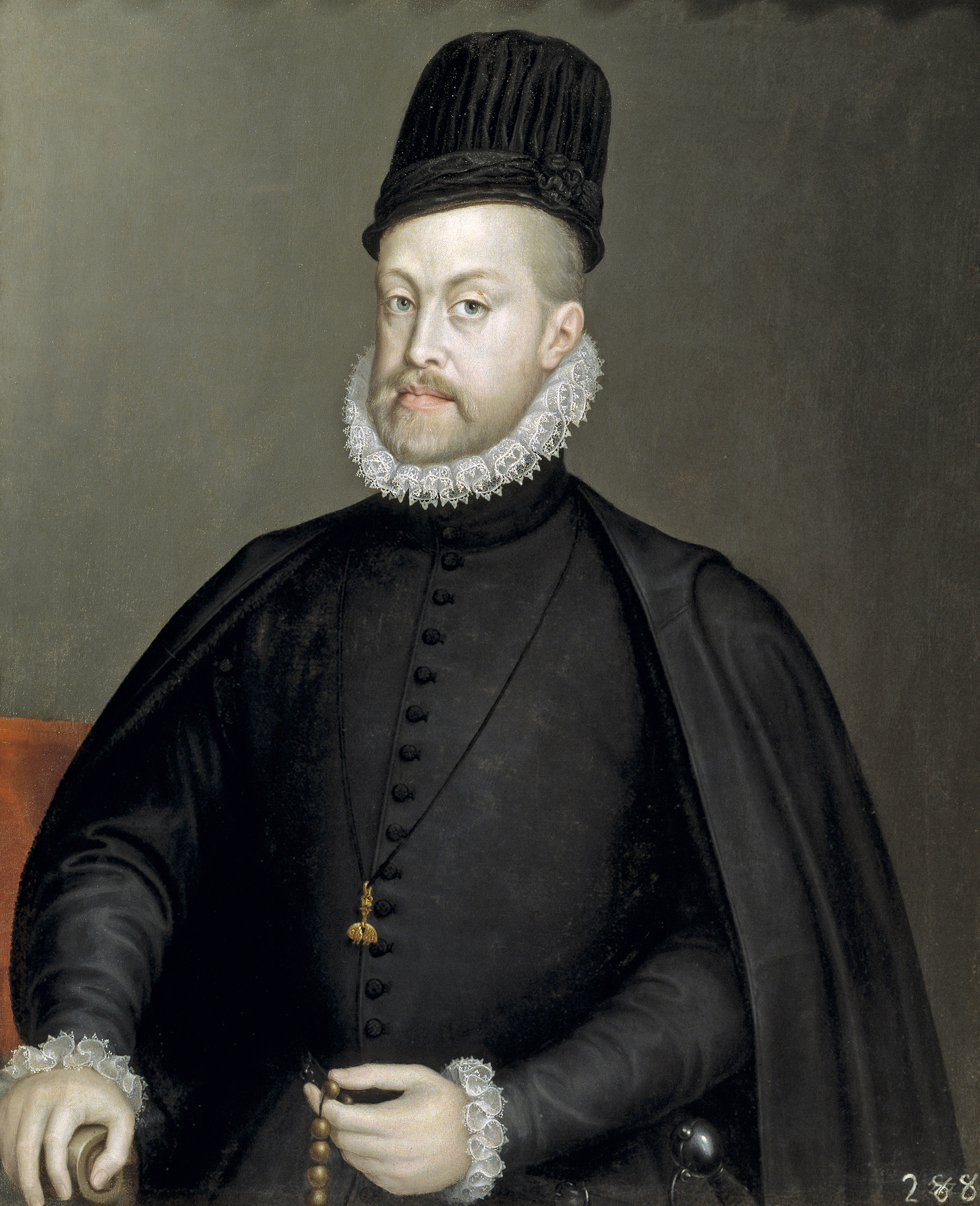
Philip II
King of Spain

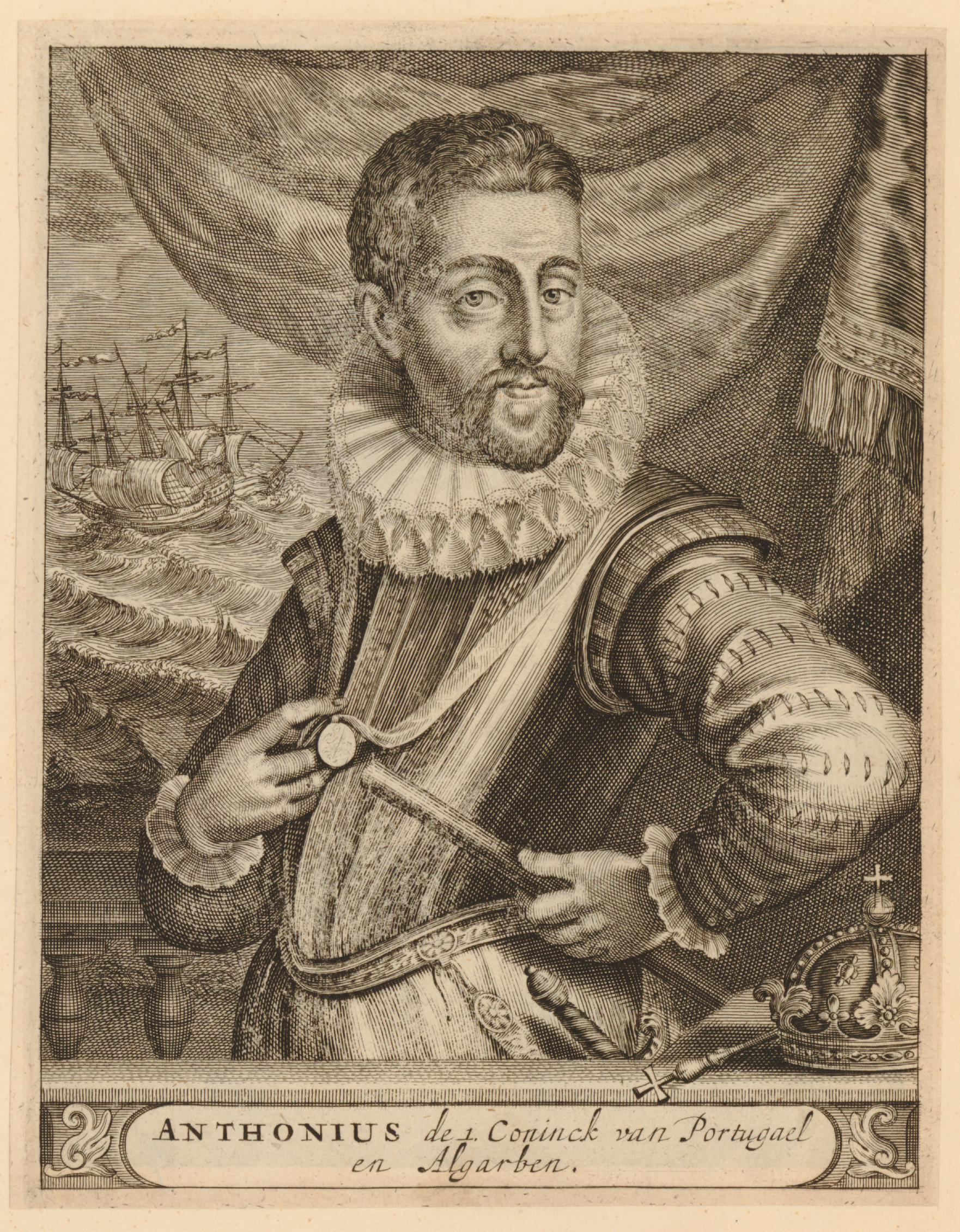
António of Portugal
Prior of Crato

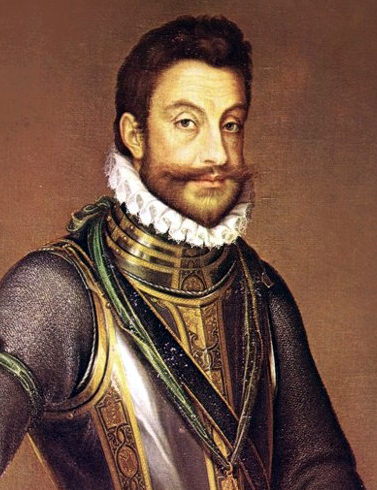
Emmanuel Philibert
Duke of Savoy

The descendants of the Duchess of Braganza obtained the throne in 1640 (in the person of her grandson John IV of Portugal), but in 1580, she was only one of several possible heirs. The heir by primogeniture was her nephew Ranuccio Farnese, being the son of Catherine's late older sister Maria, followed by his siblings; then the Duchess herself and her children; and only after them, King Philip. Philip II was a foreigner (although his mother was Portuguese) and descended from Manuel I by a female line; as for Anthony, although he was Manuel I's grandson in the male line, he was of illegitimate birth.

The heir by primogeniture, 11-year-old Ranuccio Farnese, Hereditary Duke of Parma and Piacenza, was the grandson of Infante Duarte of Portugal, the only son of Manuel I whose legitimate descendants survived at that time. However, his father Alessandro Farnese, Duke of Parma was an ally of the Spanish king, another contender, so Ranuccio's rights were not claimed at that time. Ranuccio became reigning Duke of Parma in 1592.

Instead, Ranuccio's maternal aunt Catherine, Duchess of Braganza, asserted her claim as the daughter of Infante Duarte. Catherine was married to João I, Duke of Braganza (descendant in male line from Afonso I, Duke of Braganza, an illegitimate son of King John I of Portugal), who himself was grandson of the late Duke Jaime of Braganza, also a legitimate heir of Portugal, being the son of Infanta Isabella, sister of Manuel I and daughter of Infante Ferdinand, Duke of Viseu, second son of King Duarte I. The duchess also had a son, Dom Teodósio de Braganza, who would be her royal heir and successor to the throne. Catherine's relatively strong claim was bolstered by her residency in Portugal. Although she was Henry's preferred successor, her bid for queenship ultimately failed due to her sex, the powerful influence of Philip II, and the unpopularity of her husband.

According to cognatic primogeniture from legitimate lines, the line of succession of the Portuguese throne from Manuel I's children would have been,

1. Duarte, Duke of Guimarães
  1. Ranuccio Farnese, Hereditary Duke of Parma and his siblings Odoardo and Margherita (son of Maria of Portugal, granddaughter of Manuel I)
  2. Catherine of Portugal, Duchess of Braganza and her children (granddaughter of Manuel I)
2. Isabella of Portugal
  1. Philip II of Spain and his children (son of Isabella of Portugal, daughter of Manuel I)
  2. Maria of Austria, Holy Roman Empress, Philip II's sister, and her children.
3. Beatrice of Portugal, Duchess of Savoy
  1. Emmanuel Philibert, Duke of Savoy and his only son, Charles Emmanuel I, (son of Beatrice of Portugal, daughter of Manuel I)

The Farnese line would continue. Notably, Elisabeth Farnese and her six surviving children would be the sole surviving legitimate heirs in 1731 with the death of her half-uncle, Antonio Farnese, without issue.

For Maria of Austria's lines, other than her first daughter Anna who married Maria's brother, Philip II, and merging their lines, none of them would have surviving descendants. The last of her other child dying in 1633. Philip II himself would only have two children with surviving descendants. Philip III of Spain from his fourth wife and his niece, Anna of Austria, along with Catalina Micaela of Spain from his third wife. Catalina Micaela married Charles Emmanuel I of Savoy in 1585, merging their lines. Hence, the five collateral lines from grandchildren of Manuel I had merged into just three by 1633. Farnese, Braganza, and "royal line" led by Philip III.

=== Genealogical summary ===
Claimants following King Henry I's death (1580)

MANUEL I 14th K.Portugal	Isabella of Viseu	Ferdinand II; 3rd D.Braganza
James; 4th D.Braganza
JOHN III; 15th K.Portugal	Isabella m.Charles V Emp.& K.Spain	Beatrice m.Charles III; D.Savoy	Louis; 5th D.Beja	HENRY I Cardinal, dwi 17th K.Portugal	Edward I 4th D.Guimarães	Isabella of Braganza	Teodósio I 5th D.Braganza; 3rd D.Guimarães
John; Prince	Joan	Philip II/I; K.Spain; Candidate; 19th K.Portugal	Emmanuel Filiberto; D.Savoy; Candidate	António I Prior of Crato; Candidate; 18th K.Portugal	Maria m.Alexander; D.Parma	Edward II; 5th D.Guimarães dwi	Catherine; Candidate	John I 6th D.Braganza; Candidate
SEBASTIAN I 16th K.Portugal dwi	Ranuccio Farnese; D.Parma; Candidate	Teodósio II; 7th D.Braganza
Emp.=Emperor, K.=King, D.=Duke, m.=married, dwi=died without issue	John II/IV; 8th D.Braganza; 6th D.Guimarães; 22nd K. Portugal

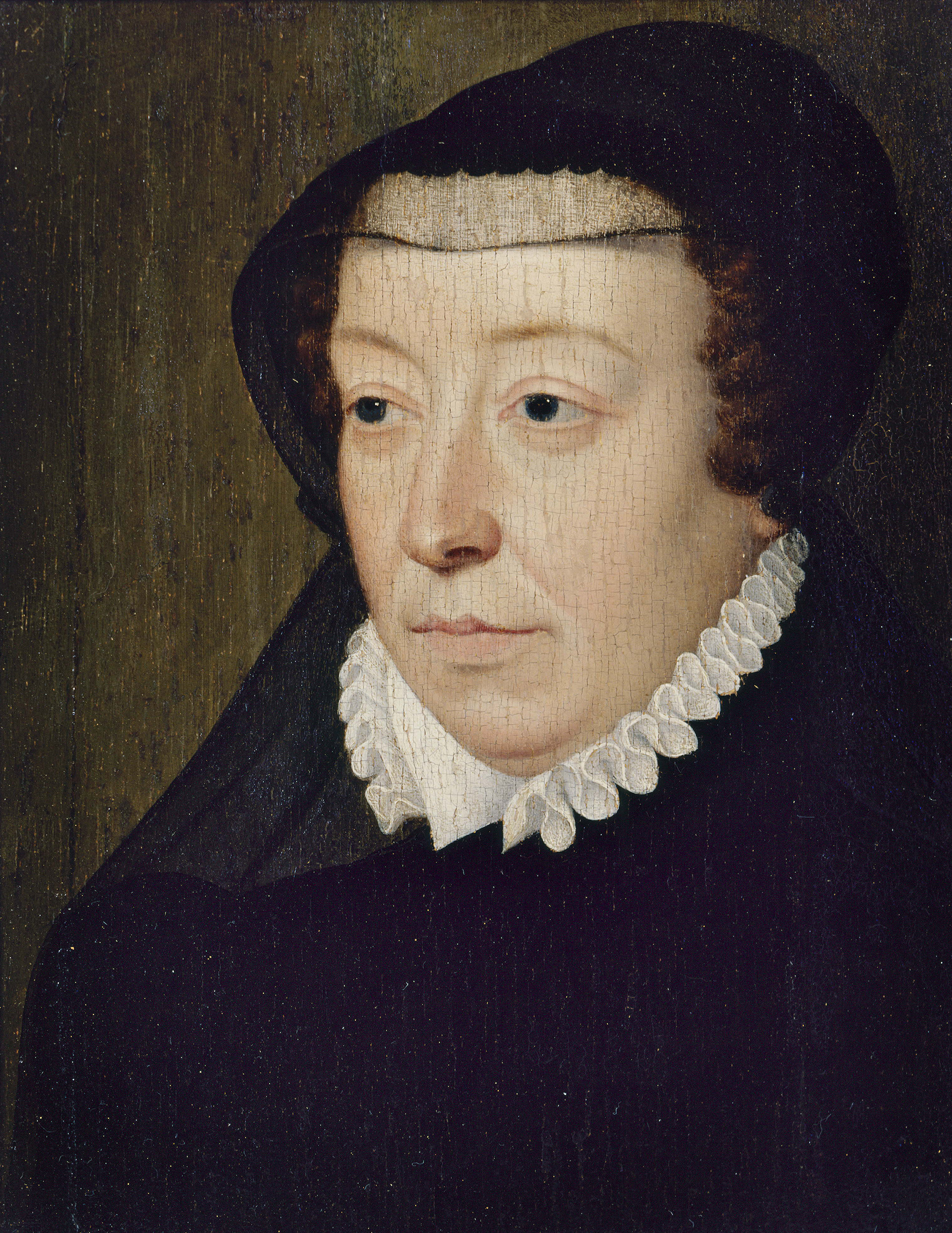
Catherine de' Medici claimed the Portuguese Throne, but her claim was widely rejected.

=== Other claimants ===
Catherine de' Medici, Queen mother of France, used a claimed descendance from King Afonso III of Portugal from his first marriage with Matilda, Countess of Boulogne to advance with a claim to the Portuguese Throne. Her claim was likely only presented to entice Philip to offer compensation for its withdrawal. She later aided António, providing him with a French fleet.

The Pope, at the time Gregory XIII, also had a claim to the Portuguese Throne, since King Henry was a Cardinal and the inheritance of all cardinals reverts to the Church. The pope claimed it was his right to have the Kingdom of Portugal, as well as a property that had belonged to the King.

Neither claim was seriously considered.

== António of Portugal and Philip of Spain ==
António, Prior of Crato (1531–1595) was a claimant of the Portuguese throne during the 1580 crisis and, according to some historians, King of Portugal (during a short time in 1580 in mainland Portugal, and since then until 1583, in the Azores). António was the illegitimate son of Infante Luis (1506–1555), and therefore grandson of King Manuel I. It was precisely because of his illegitimacy that his claim to the throne was weak and considered invalid.

Philip II of Spain managed to bring the aristocracy of the kingdom as support to his side. For the aristocracy, a personal union with Spain would prove highly profitable for Portugal at a time when the state finances were suffering. António tried to seduce the people for his cause, comparing the present situation to that of the Crisis of 1385. Then—just as in 1580—the king of Castile had invoked blood descent to inherit the Portuguese throne; and the Master of Aviz (John I), illegitimate son of King Peter I, asserted his right to the throne at the Battle of Aljubarrota, which ended in a victory for John's troops, and in the Cortes of Coimbra in 1385.

In June 1580, (Note: The exact date of António's proclamation as king varies across sources, ranging between June 17th and June 24th.) António proclaimed himself King of Portugal in Santarém, followed by acclamation in several locations throughout the country. His domestic government lasted until 25 August 1580, when he was defeated in the Battle of Alcântara by Habsburg armies led by the Duke of Alba. After the fall of Lisbon, he purported to rule the country from Terceira Island, in the Azores, where he established a government in exile until 1583. Some authors consider António the last monarch of the House of Aviz (instead of Cardinal-King Henry) and the 18th King of Portugal. His government in Terceira island was only recognized in the Azores, whereas on the continent and in the Madeira Islands power was exercised by Philip II, who was acclaimed king in 1580 as Philip I of Portugal and recognized as official king by the Cortes of Tomar in 1581. The new king's election was carried on condition that the kingdom and its overseas territories should remain separate from Spain and keep their own laws and Cortes.

After his defeat in the Azores, António went into exile in France—traditional enemy of the Habsburgs—and courted the support of England. An invasion was attempted in 1589 under Sir Francis Drake—leading the so-called English Armada—but ended in failure. António continued to fight until the end of his life for his rights to the throne.

== Consequences ==
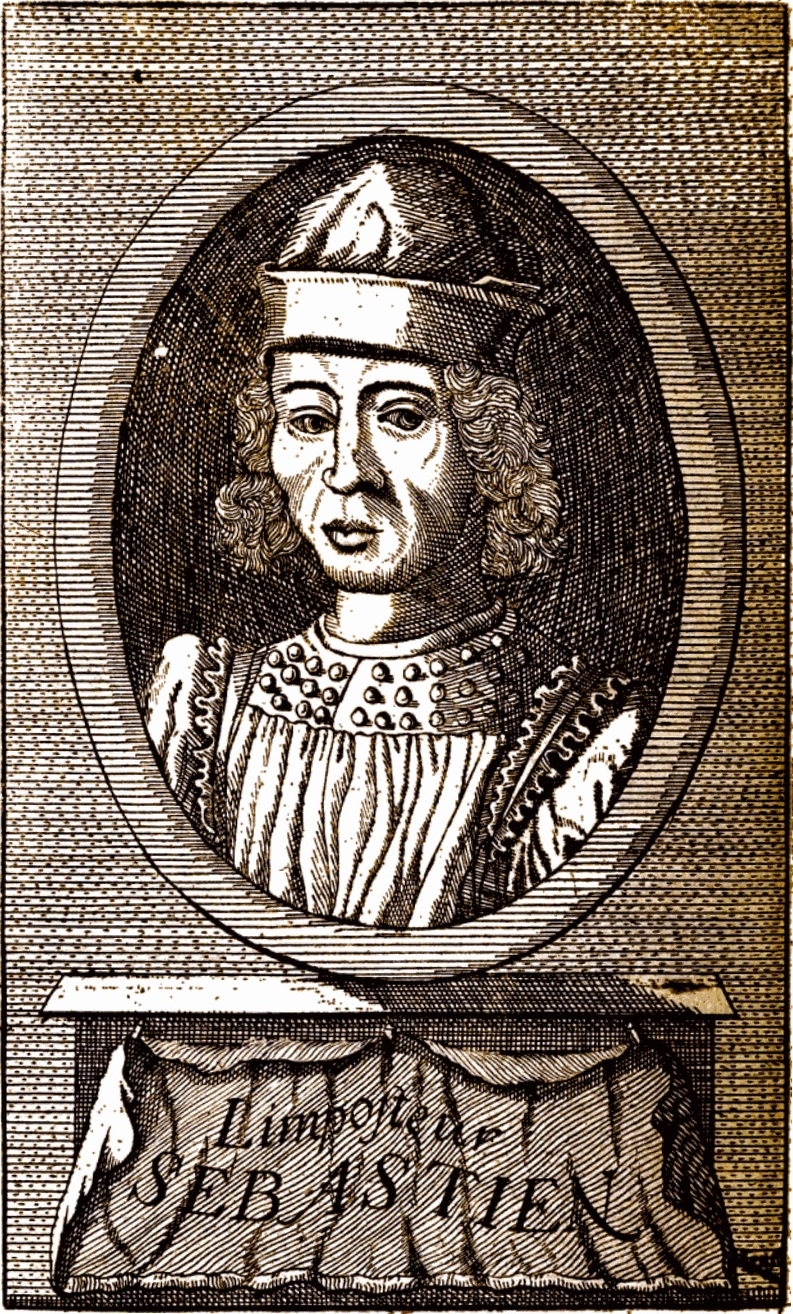
Marco Tulio Catizone from Calabria, one of the impostors who claimed to be King Sebastian

The matter of whether Portugal was actually invaded by Spain is contested. Philip II had a legitimate claim to the throne, but as with many other dynastic struggles of the age, it was shrouded in controversy. In any case, the Habsburg kings maintained Portugal's status and gave excellent positions to Portuguese nobles in the Spanish Court, and Portugal maintained an independent law, currency and government. However, Portugal saw its wealth and cultural individuality gradually decreasing. Portuguese colonies came under sustained attack from their enemies, especially the Dutch and English.

Sixty years after these events, John II, Duke of Braganza (1603–1656) accepted the throne offered by the Portuguese nobility, who had become frustrated under Habsburg rule, becoming John IV of Portugal. He was the grandson of Catherine, Duchess of Braganza, who had in 1580 claimed the Portuguese crown, and son of Teodósio II, Duke of Braganza (who died insane in 1630). John was raised to the throne of Portugal (of which he was then held to be the legitimate heir) during the Portuguese Restoration War against King Philip IV of Spain.

There were many impostors who claimed to be King Sebastian, variously in 1584, 1585, 1595, and 1598. "Sebastianism", the legend that the young king would return to Portugal on a foggy day persisted for years, and was even strong into the 1800s.

== Sources ==
- Disney, A. R. (2009). A History of Portugal and the Portuguese Empire. From Beginnings to 1807. Vol. I: Portugal. Cambridge University Press. ISBN 978-0-521-60397-3.
- Dyer, Thomas Henry (1877). Modern Europe. Vol. II. From 1521-1598 (Second ed.). London: George Bell & Sons.
- Lardner, Dionysius, ed. (1833). The History of Spain and Portugal. The Cabinet Cyclopædia. Vol. V. London: Longman, Rees, et al. pp. 207–215.
- Livermore, H.V. (1947). A History of Portugal. Cambridge University Press.
- Livermore, H.V. (1969). A New History of Portugal. Cambridge University Press. ISBN 9780521095716.
- Marques, Antonio Henrique R. de Oliveira (1976). History of Portugal. Columbia University Press. ISBN 978-0-231-08353-9.
- McMurdo, Edward (1889). The history of Portugal, from the Commencement of the Monarchy to the Reign of Alfonso III. London: Sampson Low, Marston, Searle, & Rivington.
- Stephens, H. Morse (1891). The Story of Portugal. New York: G. P. Putnam's Sons.
