= Dinis of Braganza, Count of Lemos =

Portuguese nobleman (1481–1516)

Dinis of Braganza
- Count of Lemos
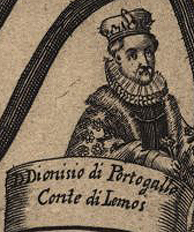
- Born: 1481
- Died: 1516 (aged 34–35)
- Spouse: Beatriz de Castro Osório, 6th Countess of Lemos
- Issue: Fernando Rodrigues; Afonso; Isabel; Maria
- House: House of Braganza
- Father: Fernando II, Duke of Braganza
- Mother: Isabel of Viseu

Dinis of Braganza (1481–1516) was the younger son of Fernando II, Duke of Braganza, and Isabella of Viseu who was the daughter of Infante Fernando, Duke of Viseu, and Beatrice of Portugal.

== Marriage and issue ==
He married Beatriz de Castro Osório, 3rd Countess of Lemos, in 1501, among their descendants are future Dukes of Braganza and John IV of Portugal.

Dinis and Beatriz had four children:

- Fernando Rodrigues de Castro (1505–1575)
- Afonso de Lencastre
- Isabel de Lencastre (1514–1558). Married her cousin Teodósio I, Duke of Braganza
- Maria de Lencastre

== Ancestry ==
Ancestors of Dinis of Braganza, Count of Lemos

8. Afonso I, Duke of Braganza
4. Fernando I, Duke of Braganza
9. Beatriz Pereira de Alvim
2. Fernando II, Duke of Braganza
10. João de Castro
5. Joana de Castro
11. Leonor da Cunha
1. Dinis of Braganza
12. Edward I of Portugal
6. Ferdinand, Duke of Viseu
13. Eleanor of Aragon
3. Isabel of Viseu
14. John, Constable of Portugal
7. Beatrice of Portugal
15. Isabel of Barcelos
