= Eleanor of Portugal, Holy Roman Empress =

Holy Roman Empress from 1452 to 1467

Eleanor of Portugal
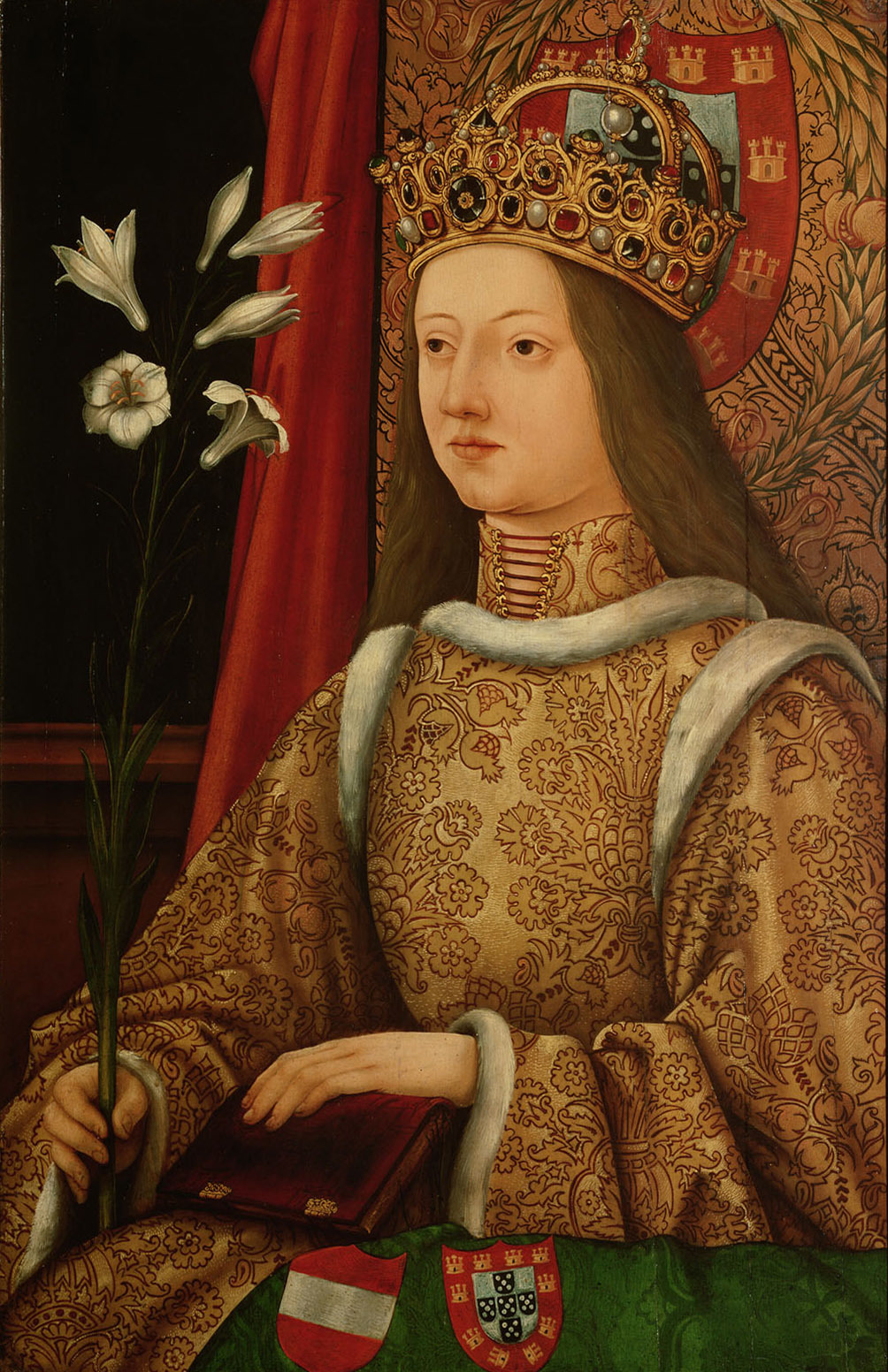
- Portrait, probably by Hans Burgkmair the Elder

Holy Roman Empress; Queen of the Romans
- Tenure: 19 March 1452 – 3 September 1467
- Coronation: 19 March 1452
- Born: 18 September 1434; Torres Vedras
- Died: 3 September 1467 (aged 32); Wiener Neustadt
- Burial: Wiener Neustadt
- Spouse: Frederick III, Holy Roman Emperor (m. 1452)
- Issue more...: Maximilian I, Holy Roman Emperor; Kunigunde, Duchess of Bavaria
- House: Aviz
- Father: Edward, King of Portugal
- Mother: Eleanor of Aragon

Eleanor of Portugal (Portuguese: Leonor; 18 September 1434 – 3 September 1467) was Empress of the Holy Roman Empire. A Portuguese infanta (princess), daughter of King Edward of Portugal and Eleanor of Aragon, she was the consort of Holy Roman Emperor Frederick III and the mother of Holy Roman Emperor Maximilian I.

== Background ==
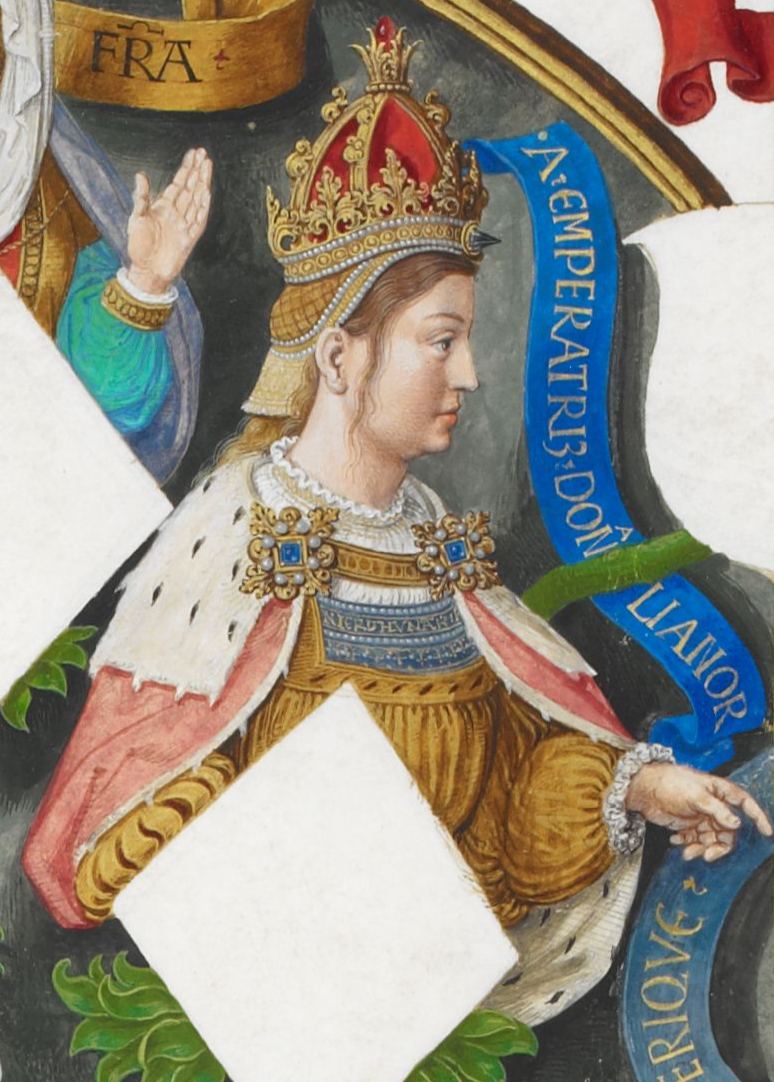
Leonor de Portugal, Sacra Imperatriz Romana, from The Portuguese Genealogy (Genealogia dos Reis de Portugal)

Eleanor was born in Torres Vedras on 18 September 1434, one of the nine children of King Edward of Portugal and Eleanor of Aragon. She was the third-eldest daughter, but her two older sisters died when they were young, leaving Eleanor as the eldest surviving daughter.

When her father died five days before her fourth birthday, Eleanor's brother Afonso V succeeded him as king, with her mother as regent. The following March, her mother gave birth to another daughter, Joan, who would become the notorious wife of Henry IV of Castile.

In 1440, Eleanor's mother was forced to go into exile in Castile after losing litigation against her brother-in-law Peter, Duke of Coimbra, for the regency of the young King Afonso. She left Eleanor behind, because she was ill at the time.

== Empress ==
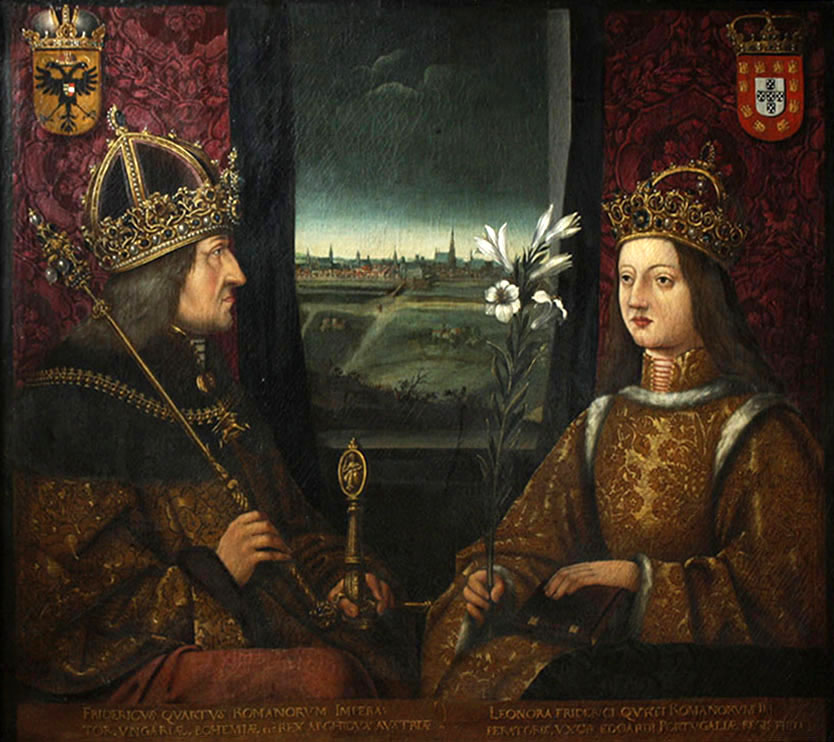
Frederick III and Eleanor of Portugal

Eleanor's marriage partner was likely suggested by her aunt, Isabella of Portugal, Duchess of Burgundy. Arrangements were made by Eleanor's maternal uncle Alfonso V, King of Aragon and Naples, who, in 1448, sent artists from his court to paint Eleanor. Eleanor was also suggested as a marriage partner for Louis, Dauphin of France, the eldest son of King Charles VII, but she herself preferred to marry Frederick, because a match with him would give her the title of empress instead of queen. The practical negotiations were made in Naples and completed in 1451. During the sea travel, the fleet escorting Eleanor to Italy was tormented by pirates and storms, and there were rumours that she had been lost at sea. Eleanor and Frederick met in Siena: Frederick was said to have paled when he saw her, partly out of excitement for her beauty, but also out of worry that she would have troubles giving birth because of her slender and frail appearance. The marriage took place in Rome. Upon her coronation, she was also given the name Helena, but she never used this name. The festivities were hosted by her uncle, the king of Naples.

Eleanor and Frederick were dissimilar and never happy. She was an ambitious and wilful woman who frequently participated in intrigues, whereas the emperor was a sober and uninspiring man. Her interest in dancing, gambling and hunting was not shared by Frederick, and their relationship was affected by their differences. Frederick sent Eleanor's vast Portuguese entourage home after the wedding because of the cost, and she suffered from homesickness; he also blamed her for causing the death of several of their children by letting them eat Portuguese food, and therefore took over the upbringing of the remaining children entirely for himself. During a period of siege in Vienna, when people were forced to eat rats, cats and dogs, she was known for trying to cheer people up. In historical writings, there is a sense that Eleanor was taken from a splendid, extravagant and luxurious court in Portugal to a cultural wasteland in Vienna because of her spouse's strict economic sense.

== Marriage and children ==
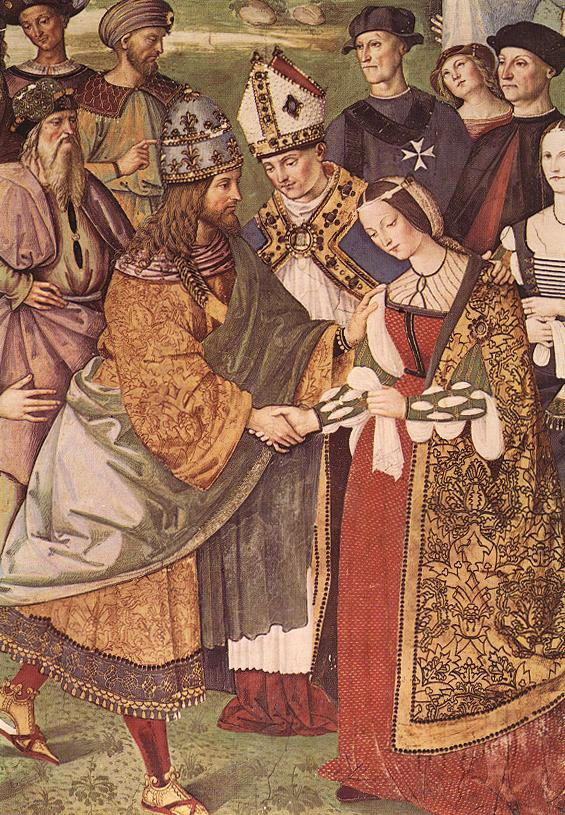
Eneias Silvio Piccolomini (the future Pope Pius II) celebrating the marriage between Frederick III and Eleanor

On 16 March 1452 in Rome, she married the German king Frederick III, and the two were crowned emperor and empress three days later, on 19 March 1452, by Pope Nicholas V at St. Peter's Basilica. Her dowry was used by her husband to alleviate his financial problems and cement his power. Frederick III was the last emperor to be crowned in Rome.

During her marriage to Frederick III, she had five children:

1. Archduke Christoph (16 November 1455 – 21 March 1456)
2. Archduke Maximilian (later Maximilian I, Holy Roman Emperor) (22 March 1459 – 12 January 1519)
3. Archduchess Helena (3 November 1460 – 28 February 1461)
4. Archduchess Kunigunde (16 March 1465 – 6 August 1520), married Albert IV, Duke of Bavaria
5. Archduke Johannes (9 August 1466 – 10 February 1467)

Eleanor died in Wiener Neustadt on 3 September 1467 and is buried in the Cistercian abbey Neukloster, where her tombstone is still prominent in the church's apse.

== Sources ==
- de Carvalho, Helena Avelar (2021). An Astrologer at Work in Late Medieval France: The Notebooks of S. Belle. Brill. ISBN 978-90-04-46337-0.
- Crankshaw, Edward (1971). The Habsburgs: Portrait of a Dynasty. The Viking Press.
- Watanabe, Morimichi (2024). Christianson, Gerald (ed.). Nicholas of Cusa - A Companion to his Life and his Times. Routledge.
- Sigrid-Maria Größing, AEIOU - Glück und Unglück im österreichischen Kaiserhaus, Verlag Amalthea, ISBN 978-3-85002-633-8

Elanor of Portugal House of Aviz Cadet branch of the House of Burgundy Born: 18 September 1434 Died: 3 September 1467
Royal titles
Vacant Title last held by Elizabeth of Luxembourg	Queen of the Romans; 1452–1467	Vacant Title next held by Bianca Maria Sforza
Vacant Title last held by Barbara of Cilli	Holy Roman Empress; 1452–1467	Vacant Title next held by Bianca Maria Sforza
