= Portuguese Interregnum =

Portuguese interregnum may refer to:

- The First Portuguese Interregnum between 1383 and 1385.
- The Second Portuguese Interregnum in 1580.
