= Ferdinand II =

Ferdinand II is the name of:

- Ferdinand II of León (1132–1188), king from 1157
- Fernando II, Duke of Braganza (1430–1483), also known as Ferdinand II (1430–e.1483)
- Ferdinand II of Aragon (1452–1516), the Catholic, king of Aragon from 1479, of Sicily from 1468; Ferdinand V of Castile 1474–1504 and Ferdinand III of Naples 1504–1516
- Ferdinand II of Naples (1469–1496), also known as Ferrandino, king from 1495
- Ferdinand II, Archduke of Austria (1529–1595), archduke, Regent of Tyrol and Further Austria, ruled from 1564
- Ferdinand II, Holy Roman Emperor (1578–1637), also known as Ferdinand II of Germany, emperor from 1619
- Ferdinando II de' Medici, Grand Duke of Tuscany (1610–1670), Grand Duke of Tuscany from 1620
- Ferdinand II of the Two Sicilies (1810–1859), king from 1830
- Ferdinand II of Portugal (1816–1885), king 1837–1853
