= Isabel of Viseu =

Duchess of Braganza (1459–1521)

Infanta Isabel
- Duchess of Braganza
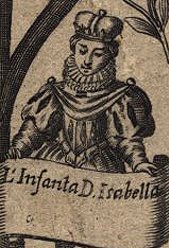
- Isabel of Viseu in a c. 1645 genealogy of the Kings of Portugal (National Library of Portugal).
- Born: 1459; Beja, Portugal
- Died: April 1521 (aged 61–62); Lisbon, Portugal
- Spouse: Fernando II, Duke of Braganza
- Issue: Jaime, Duke of Braganza; Dinis of Portugal
- House: Aviz (by birth); Braganza (by marriage)
- Father: Infante Fernando, Duke of Viseu
- Mother: Beatrice of Portugal

Isabel of Viseu (1459–1521) was a daughter of Infante Fernando, Duke of Viseu and his wife and cousin Infanta Beatrice, Duchess of Viseu. She was a member of the House of Aviz and later, House of Braganza.

== Family ==
She was the sister of Manuel I of Portugal and Leonor of Viseu. Her maternal grandparents were Infante João of Portugal and his wife Isabella of Barcelos. Her paternal grandparents were Edward of Portugal and Leonor of Aragon.

Isabel's cousin was Isabella I of Castile, wife of Ferdinand II of Aragon and mother of the English queen, Catherine of Aragon.

== Life ==
=== Marriage ===
In 1472, Isabel married Fernando II, Duke of Braganza. This was Fernando's second marriage, after the death of his first wife, Leonor de Menezes. Leonor had not borne any children, so Isabel needed to deliver a son.

Isabel and Fernando had four children:

- Filippe de Braganza (6 July 1475 - 1483)
- Jaime, Duke of Braganza (1479 - 20 September 1532), succeeded his father as Duke of Braganza. Married firstly to Eleanor of Mendoza, had issue. Married secondly to Joana de Mendoça and had issue.
- Dinis of Braganza, Count of Lemos (1481 - 9 May 1516), younger surviving son and ancestor of John IV of Portugal.
- Margarida de Braganza, died young in June 1483.

=== Downfall ===
Even at a young age, John II of Portugal was not popular among the peers of the kingdom since he was immune to external influence and appeared to despise intrigue. The nobles (including particularly Isabella's husband, the Duke of Braganza) were afraid of his future policies as king.

After the official accession to the throne in 1481, John II took a series of measures to curtail the overgrown power of his aristocracy and to concentrate power on himself. Immediately, the nobles started to conspire; John II did nothing but observe. Letters of complaint and pleas to intervene were exchanged between the Duke of Braganza and Queen Isabella I of Castile. In 1483, this correspondence was intercepted by royal spies. The House of Braganza was outlawed, their lands confiscated and Isabel's husband executed in Évora.

The following year Isabel's brother was murdered by King John himself because there was word of a new conspiracy that also involved Isabel's second cousin and her father's brother in law. Isabel's family would have felt safe because her sister Leonor was married to John II, but they weren't safe at all. Many other members of Isabel's family were murdered including her elder brother Diogo, Duke of Viseu.

=== Later years ===
In 1495, John died without surviving legitimate issue and Isabel's brother succeeded him as Manuel I of Portugal. At first, Leanor was made heiress but because she was Dowager Queen and had no surviving children, the post as heiress was passed to Isabel, who in turn passed it to her eldest son Jaime, who was heir from 1495 until 1498 when Manuel's son Miguel da Paz, Prince of Portugal was born.

Isabel died in 1521, she was 62 years of age at the Lisbon Convent of the Mother of God, her brother died later in the year, her sister Leonor died 4 years later. Out of their four children Jaime and Dinis survived to adulthood, Jaime later succeeded his father as Duke of Braganza.

== Ancestry ==
Ancestors of Isabel of Viseu

8. John I of Portugal
4. Edward I of Portugal
9. Philippa of Lancaster
2. Ferdinand, Duke of Viseu
10. Ferdinand I of Aragon
5. Eleanor of Aragon
11. Eleanor of Alburquerque
1. Isabella of Viseu
12. John I of Portugal (= 8)
6. John, Constable of Portugal
13. Philippa of Lancaster (= 9)
3. Beatrice of Portugal
14. Afonso I, Duke of Braganza
7. Isabel of Barcelos
15. Beatriz Pereira de Alvim

== See also ==
- Duke of Braganza

== Bibliography ==
- dos Guimarães Sá, Isabel (2009). "Cousin Marriage and Well-Being Among the Portuguese Royal Family During the 15th and 16th Centuries". In Durães, Margarida (ed.). The Transmission of Well- Being: Gendered Marriage Strategies and Inheritance Systems in Europe (17th-20th Centuries). Peter Lang. pp. 101–122. ISBN 9783034300568.
