= Portuguese Cortes =

Meetings of the Portuguese monarchy

Portuguese towns which hosted Cortes

In the medieval Kingdom of Portugal, the Cortes was an assembly of representatives of the estates of the realm – the nobility, clergy and commoners. It was called and dismissed by the King of Portugal at will, at a place of his choosing. Cortes which brought all three estates together are sometimes distinguished as Cortes-Gerais (General Courts), in contrast to smaller assemblies which brought only one or two estates, to negotiate a specific point relevant only to them.

Portuguese monarchs had always called intermittent "king's courts" (Curia Regis), consultative assemblies of feudal nobles and landed clerics (bishops, abbots and the masters of the Military Orders) to advise on major matters. This practice probably originated in the protofeudalism of the 6th-century Visigothic Kingdom. But, during the 13th century, with the growing power of municipalities, and kings increasingly reliant on urban militias, incorporated towns gained the right to participate in the king's court. The Cortes assembled at Leiria in 1254 by Afonso III of Portugal was the first known Portuguese Cortes to explicitly include representatives of the municipalities. In this, Portugal was accompanying the pattern in neighboring Iberian kingdoms (e.g. the Kings of León admitted town representatives to their Cortes in 1188).

Medieval Kings of Portugal continued to rely on small assemblies of notables, and only summoned the full Cortes on extraordinary occasions. A Cortes would be called if the king wanted to introduce new taxes, change some fundamental laws, announce significant shifts in foreign policy (e.g. ratify treaties), or settle matters of royal succession, issues where the cooperation and assent of the towns were necessary. Changing taxation (especially requesting war subsidies), was probably the most frequent reason for convening the Cortes. As the nobles and clergy were largely tax-exempt, setting taxation involved intensive negotiations between the royal council and the burgher delegates at the Cortes.

Delegates (procuradores) not only considered the king's proposals, but, in turn, also used the Cortes to submit petitions of their own to the royal council on a myriad of matters, e.g. extending and confirming town privileges, punishing abuses of officials, introducing new price controls, constraints on Jews, pledges on coinage, etc. The royal response to these petitions became enshrined as ordinances and statutes, thus giving the Cortes the aspect of a legislature. These petitions were originally referred to as aggravamentos (grievances) then artigos (articles) and eventually capitulos (chapters). In a Cortes-Gerais, petitions were discussed and voted upon separately by each estate and required the approval of at least two of the three estates before being passed up to the royal council. The proposal was then subject to royal veto (either accepted or rejected by the king in its entirety) before becoming law.

Nonetheless, the exact extent of Cortes power was ambiguous. Kings insisted on their ancient prerogative to promulgate laws independently of the Cortes. The compromise, in theory, was that ordinances enacted in Cortes could only be modified or repealed by Cortes. But even that principle was often circumvented or ignored in practice.

The Cortes probably had their heyday in the 14th and 15th centuries, reaching their apex when the usurping John I of Portugal relied almost wholly upon the commoners for his power. For a period after the 1383–1385 Crisis, the Cortes were convened almost annually. But as time went on, they became less important. Portuguese monarchs, tapping into the riches of the Portuguese Empire overseas, grew less dependent on Cortes subsidies and convened them less frequently. John II (r.1481-1495) used them to break the high nobility, but dispensed with them otherwise. Manuel I (r.1495-1521) convened them only four times in his long reign. By the time of Sebastian (r.1554–1578), the Cortes was practically an irrelevance.

The Cortes gained a new importance with the Iberian Union of 1581, finding a role as the representative of Portuguese interests to the new Habsburg monarch. The Cortes played a critical role in the 1640 Restoration, and enjoyed a brief period of resurgence during the reign of John IV (r.1640-1656). But by the end of the 17th century, it found itself sidelined once again.

It is essential, at this point, to remember the fact that there were only five occasions when the Cortes were of immense importance for the History of Portugal:

- with the coronation of D. João I, in the Courts of Coimbra in 1385;
- with the appointment of D. Pedro, Duke of Coimbra, as regent of D. Afonso V, in the Cortes of Torres Novas of 1438;
- with the coronation of Philip II of Spain as Philip I of Portugal, in the Cortes of Tomar of 1581;
- with the acclamation of D. João IV, in the Cortes of Lisbon between 1645–1646;
- and, finally, with the appointment of Prince Peter as the regent to his brother Afonso VI, who was declared insane, in the Cortes of Lisbon of 1668.

In all of these occasions, the Cortes were used to essentially legitimize and confirm the changes in the reigning power. Two other occasions can also be underlined for their long-term importance namely the Cortes of Lisbon of 1289, where the concordat of the Forty Articles with Pope Nicholas V was ratified, and the Cortes of Elvas of 1361, where the beneplácito régio[pt] was first utilized.

The last Cortes met in 1698, for the mere formality of confirming the appointment of Infante John (future John V) as the successor of Peter II of Portugal. Thereafter, Portuguese kings ruled as absolute monarchs. No Cortes were assembled for over a century. This state of affairs came to an end with the Liberal Revolution of 1820, which set in motion the introduction of a new constitution, and a permanent and proper parliament, that however inherited the name of Cortes Gerais.

== List of Portuguese Cortes ==
Afonso I (1139–1185)

- 1143 – Cortes of Lamego (legendary) – to confirm D. Afonso Henriques's title as the independent King of Portugal, and establish the rules of succession to the throne. Ostensibly, prevents succession by females if they are married to a foreigner. This has been since proven to be a purely legendary fabrication, invented at the time of the Restoration of 1640.

Sancho I (1185–1211)

Afonso II (1211–1223)

- 1211 – Cortes of Coimbra – first definitive Cortes – established the first general laws (Leis Gerais do Reino), protecting the king's property, stipulating measures of administering justice and the rights of his subjects to be protected from abuses by royal officials and confirming the clerical donations of his predecessor. Also, affirmed the validity of canon law for the Church in Portugal, but also introduces the prohibition of the purchase of lands by churches or monasteries (although they can be acquired by donations and legacies).

Sancho II (1223–1248)

Afonso III (1248–1279)

- 1254 – Cortes of Leiria – first to include burgher delegates from the incorporated municipalities Introduction of the monetagio, a fixed sum paid by the burghers to the Crown as a substitute for the septennium (the traditional revision of the face value of coinage by the Crown every seven years); also introduced staple laws on the Douro River, favoring the new royal city of Vila Nova de Gaia at the expense of the old episcopal city of Porto.
- 1256 – Cortes of Guimarães
- 1261 – Cortes of Guimarães – to discuss the recent debasement of the currency; allowed Afonso III's recent debasement, but extracted pledges forbidding future debasements. In return for a new property tax, the old "septennium" is replaced with a new rule allowing only one revision of coinage per reign.
- 1273 – Cortes of Santarém – to consider Pope Gregory X's bull ordering the restoration of property and rights of Portuguese bishops (seven of the nine Portuguese bishops had formally protested to the pope about the heavy-handed Inquirições Afonsinas, the royal investigations, launched in 1258, into the titles of episcopal lands, ostensibly to "recover" alienated royal property.) The Cortes find the king has not violated anything.

Denis (1279–1325)

- 1282 – Cortes of Évora – to review a royal offer to Pope Martin V to resolve the episcopal quarrel (the terms are unacceptable to the pope and rejected; documents suggest the offer was originally crafted by the king in consultation with the clergy alone in Guarda, and so the Évora Cortes may have only been considering a reply to the papal rejection)
- 1283 – Cortes of Coimbra
- 1285 – Cortes of Lisbon – to consider renewal of papal demand for restoration of episcopal rights again – papal position rejected again – Cortes approves a new round of Inquirições, and requests the investigations be extended to the nobility (i.e. review their titular claims to tax-exempt property). Also approves new law forbidding the sale of lands to religious corporations (and forcing them to sell all land acquired since the beginning of his reign).
- 1288 – Cortes of Guimarães – Cortes reiterates request for inquisitions into noble titles
- 1289 – Cortes of Lisbon – ratify concordat of the Forty Articles with Pope Nicholas V, settling the episcopal question
- 1323 – Cortes of Lisbon

Afonso IV (1325–1357)

- 1325 – Cortes of Évora – enacted sumptuary laws on Jews and Muslims
- 1331 – Cortes of Santarém
- 1334 – Cortes of Santarém – approved marriage of heir Peter to Castilian noblewoman Constance of Peñafiel, clearing the way for an interventionist war on behalf of her father, Juan Manuel de Vilhena, against King Alfonso XI of Castile.
- 1335 – Cortes of Coimbra
- 1340 – Cortes of Santarém
- 1352 – Cortes of Lisbon – protest against the introduction of juízes de fora (external judges, nominated and paid for by the crown), as a violation of local charters and customary rights

Peter I (1357–1367)

- 1361 – Cortes of Elvas – negotiate concordata with the clergy; protest royal nomination of elective judges – first recorded use of beneplácito régio (requirement of royal review and assent before regulations issued by the Papal Curia could be applied to the clergy in Portugal)

Ferdinand I (1367–1383)

- 1371 – Cortes of Lisbon
- 1372 – Cortes of Porto – protest against the Fernandine wars
- 1372 – Cortes of Leiria – Cortes rejects king Ferdinand's request for financing
- 1373 – Cortes of Santarém
- 1375 – Cortes of Atouguia
- 1376 – Cortes of Leiria – recognized Beatrice of Portugal as the heir of King Ferdinand
- 1380 – Cortes of Torres Novas
- 1383 – Cortes of Santarém

John I (1385–1433)

- 1385 – Cortes of Coimbra – to debate the pretenders to the throne, acclaim John, Master of Aviz, as King John I of Portugal; also imposed that the king must include burgher representatives in the royal council (from triple nomination lists supplied by the towns) and to impose no taxes or tributes, nor make war nor peace, without the consent of the Cortes; also the first Cortes to grant the king the sisas (excise taxes on transactions, existing locally since at least 1311, but only now definitively made a royal tax)
- 1386 – Cortes of Braga – The sisas, were instituted throughout the kingdom to cover the costs of war against Castile and explicitly tells how to perform the payment of said tax
- 1387 – Cortes of Coimbra
- 1387 – Cortes of Braga
- 1389 – Cortes of Lisbon
- 1390 – Cortes of Coimbra
- 1391 – Cortes of Évora
- 1391 – Cortes of Coimbra – introduce the Jewish badge, a red star of David to be worn by Jews visibly on their clothing
- 1391 – Cortes of Viseu – to reimpose price controls and labor laws (corvée) suspended during the 1380s crisis
- 1394–1395 – Cortes of Coimbra
- 1396 – Cortes of Santarém
- 1398 – Cortes of Coimbra – establish that all debts since 1385 must be paid in real coinage (by the metal content at time of contract), rather than nominally with debased currency
- 1398 – Cortes of Porto
- 1399 – Cortes of Lisbon
- 1400 – Cortes of Coimbra
- 1401 – Cortes of Guimarães
- 1402 – Cortes of Santarém
- 1404 – Cortes of Lisbon
- 1406 – Cortes of Santarém
- 1408 – Cortes of Évora
- 1410 – Cortes of Lisbon
- 1412 – Cortes of Lisbon
- 1413 – Cortes of Lisbon
- 1414 – Cortes of Lisbon
- 1416 – Cortes of Estremoz
- 1417 – Cortes of Lisbon
- 1418 – Cortes of Santarém
- 1427 – Cortes of Lisbon – to negotiate second concordata with the clergy, setting limits on ecclesiastical privileges
- 1430 – Cortes of Santarém

Edward (1433–1438)

- 1434 – Cortes of Santarém – wholesale review of the laws of the realm, introduction of capitulos gerais
- 1435 – Cortes of Évora – ratification of the Lei Mental, establishing direct male primogeniture in the inheritance of feudal grants, otherwise they revert to crown
- 1436 – Cortes of Évora – to finance Tangier expedition
- 1437 – Cortes of Leiria – to ratify treaty with Marinid Morocco and deliver Portuguese Ceuta in exchange for the captive infante Ferdinand the Saint Prince – failed

Queen Eleanor of Aragon, (regent for Afonso V), (1438–1439)

- 1438 – Cortes of Torres Novas – reviewed the will of the late Edward of Portugal, appointing Eleanor of Aragon as regent for the young king Afonso V; passed law requiring that the Cortes must henceforth be assembled annually (not really observed)
- 1439 – Cortes of Lisbon – assembled by constable John of Reguengos, elected Peter of Coimbra as regent of the realm

Duke Peter of Coimbra (regent for Afonso V) (1439–1448)

- 1441 – Cortes of Torres Novas
- 1442 – Cortes of Évora
- 1444 – Cortes of Évora
- 1446 – Cortes of Lisbon – to declare Afonso V's majority (declared, but Peter's regency continues at Afonso V's request); revealed the Afonsine Ordinances

Afonso V (in his own right) (1448–1481)

- 1451 – Cortes of Santarém – burghers chastise king for promulgating laws outside the Cortes; assert that laws passed in Cortes, can only be modified in Cortes
- 1451 – Cortes of Lisbon
- 1455 – Cortes of Lisbon – to present the newborn royal heir John (future John II, and receive oaths of loyalty; burghers used opportunity to protest use of royal letters to circumvent 1451 restrictions
- 1456 – Cortes of Lisbon
- 1459 – Cortes of Lisbon
- 1461 – Cortes of Évora
- 1465 – Cortes of Guarda – to consider an appeal from Joan of Portugal (consort queen of Henry IV of Castile) to intervene in Castile against the rebellion of Afonso of Asturias – intervention was rejected by the Cortes
- 1468 – Cortes of Santarém
- 1471 – Cortes of Lisbon
- 1472–1473 – Cortes of Coimbra
- 1475 – Cortes of Évora
- 1475 – Cortes of Arronches
- 1476 – Cortes of Lisbon
- 1477 – Cortes of Montemor-o-Novo
- 1477 – Cortes of Santarém
- 1478 – Cortes of Lisbon

John II (1481–1495)

- 1481 – Cortes of Évora
- 1483 – Cortes of Santarém
- 1490 – Cortes of Évora

Manuel I (1495–1521)

- 1495 – Cortes of Montemor-o-Novo – review will of late John II, invite political exiles to return, criticize proposed India expedition
- 1498 – Cortes of Lisbon
- 1499 – Cortes of Lisbon
- 1502 – Cortes of Lisbon

John III (1521–1557)

- 1525 – Cortes of Torres Novas – require king to assemble the Cortes at least once every ten years.
- 1535 – Cortes of Évora – to declare Prince Manuel as heir to the throne (but died 1537).
- 1544 – Cortes of Almeirim

Catherine of Austria (regent for Sebastian) (1557–1562)

- 1562 – Cortes of Lisbon

Sebastian (in his own right) (1562–1578)

Henry (1578–1580)

- 1579 – Cortes of Lisbon – assembled by Cardinal-Regent Henry of Portugal to resolve controversy on the succession to the late Sebastian
- 1580 – Cortes of Almeirim – to ratify Henry's right to appoint Philip II of Spain as his successor, disputed by burghers

Philip I (II of Spain) (1581–1598)

- 1581 – Cortes of Tomar – recognize the ascension of Philip II of Spain as king of Portugal, set out conditions of his reign (see Iberian Union)
- 1583 – Cortes of Lisbon – to ratify Philip, Prince of Asturias as heir of the Portuguese Realm

Philip II (III of Spain) (1598–1621)

- 1619 – Cortes of Lisbon – to ratify Philip, Prince of Asturias as heir of the Portuguese Realm

Philip III (IV of Spain) (1621–1640)

John IV (1640–1656)

- 1641 – Cortes of Lisbon
- 1642 – Cortes of Lisbon
- 1645-1646 – Cortes of Lisbon
- 1653 – Cortes of Lisbon

Luisa of Guzman (regent for Afonso VI) (1656–1662)

Afonso VI (in his own right) (1662–1668)

- 1668 – Cortes of Lisbon – declare Afonso VI insane, install Prince Peter as regent

Prince Peter (regent for Afonso VI) (1668–1683)

- 1674 – Cortes of Lisbon – dissolved when the Cortes attempted to tie taxes to particular government expenditures
- 1679-1680 – Cortes of Lisbon

Peter II (in his own right) (1683–1706)

- 1697-1698 – Cortes of Lisbon – the 'Last Cortes' – recognized Infante John (future John V) as the successor to the throne

Absolute monarchy thereafter: No Cortes assembled in reigns of John V (1706–1750), Joseph I (1750–1777), Maria I (1777–1816).

Thereafter there were only two exceptional Cortes: John VI (1816–1826) called the 1820 assembly of the Cortes Gerais e Extraordinárias da Nação Portuguesa to draft a new constitution. The other exception was during the 1828–1834 reign of Miguel of Portugal, when the constitution was suspended. An old-style Cortes was assembled by Miguel in Lisbon in 1828 to recognize Miguel as the sole legitimate heir to John VI.

== See also ==
- List of Portuguese monarchs
- Timeline of Portuguese history
- Parliaments
