= Fernando II, Duke of Braganza =

Portuguese nobleman (1430–1483)

Fernando II
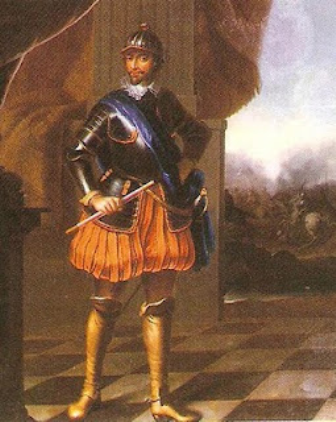
- D. Fernando II; Vila Viçosa Castle

Duke of Braganza
- Tenure: 1 April 1478 – 20 June 1483
- Predecessor: Fernando I
- Successor: Jaime I
- Born: 1430; Kingdom of Portugal
- Died: 20 June 1483 (aged 52–53); Évora, Alentejo, Kingdom of Portugal
- Spouse: Leonor de Menezes; Isabella of Viseu
- Issue among others...: Jaime I, 4th Duke of Braganza; Dinis, 6th Count of Lemos
- House: House of Braganza
- Father: Fernando I, Duke of Braganza
- Mother: Joana de Castro

Dom Fernando II of Braganza (Portuguese pronunciation: [fɨɾˈnɐ̃du]; 1430 – 20 June 1483) was the 3rd Duke of Braganza and the 1st Duke of Guimarães, among other titles. He is known for being executed for treason against the King.

== Early life ==
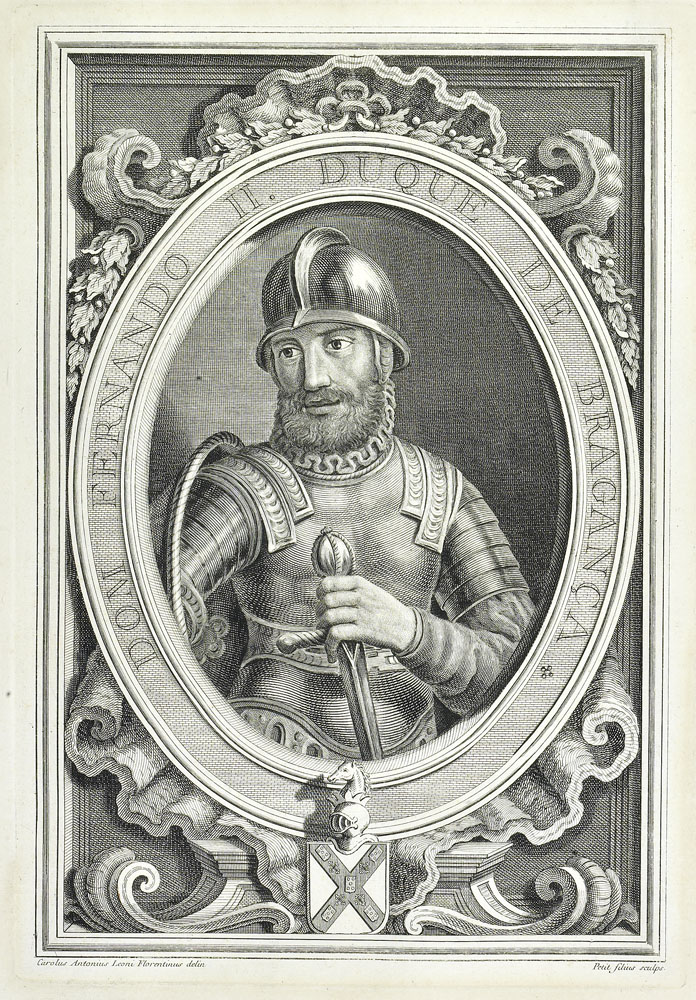
A posthumous engraving of D. Fernando II.

Fernando II, born in 1430, was a successful young man and quickly grew popular amongst the Portuguese nobility. He was most appreciated by King Afonso V of Portugal, and always escorted the King on his different incursions into Morocco, where he participated in several conquests and expeditions. Being favored by King Afonso V, Fernando was created Count of Guimarães in 1464. He was soon upgraded to Duke of Guimarães in 1475.

Fernando II took part in the War of the Castilian Succession. Following King Henry IV of Castile's death, the King's daughter and heir, Joanna La Beltraneja, married to King Afonso V, was proclaimed "Queen of Castile", but she had the opposition of her half-aunt (the future queen Isabella I of Castile) to contend with. The Portuguese invaded Castile, and during the Battle of Toro, Fernando was responsible for Queen Joanna’s safety.

When his father, Fernando I, 2nd Duke of Braganza, died in 1478, Fernando II inherited the various titles of his father, the most important and noteworthy being the title of Duke of Braganza. At this time, the House of Braganza was the most powerful noble house in the Kingdom of Portugal (with its seat at Vila Viçosa) and one of the most powerful ones in all of the Iberian Kingdoms. During that period, the Dukes of Braganza resided at Vila Viçosa Castle.

== Treason and downfall ==
When King John II of Portugal succeeded his father, King Afonso V, he sought to bring down the power of the Portuguese nobility, which had greatly flourished under his father's reign. The King heavily focused on diminishing the powers of the two most powerful noble houses in the kingdom, the House of Beja and Viseu and the House of Braganza.

King John II accused Fernando of Braganza, his second half-cousin, of high treason and had him executed at Évora in 1483. Afterwards, the assets of the House of Braganza were confiscated and the family fled to Castile. (Note: The family returned in 1498 and had all their property returned.) Shortly after, in 1484, John accused his first cousin, Diogo I of Beja and Viseu (brother-in-law of Fernando II), of the same offense and stabbed him to death.

== Marriage and issue ==
Fernando II of Braganza married twice. His first marriage was to D. Leonor de Menezes; they had no issue. He later married Isabella of Viseu (daughter of Prince Ferdinand, Duke of Beja and Viseu, and sister of King Manuel I of Portugal) in 1472, with whom he had four children, though only two reached adulthood.

Name	Birth	Death	Notes
Filipe of Braganza	unknown	unknown	
Jaime I of Braganza	October 1479	20 September 1532	11th Count of Barcelos, 8th Count of Ourém, 5th Count of Arraiolos and Neiva, 4th Duke of Braganza, 3rd Marquis of Vila Viçosa, 2nd Duke of Guimarães
Dinis of Braganza	1481	1516	6th Count of Lemos
Margarida of Braganza	unknown	unknown	

== Ancestry ==
Ancestors of Fernando II, Duke of Braganza

8. John I of Portugal
4. Afonso, Duke of Braganza
9. Inês Pires
2. Fernando I, Duke of Braganza
10. Nuno Álvares Pereira, 7th Count of Barcelos
5. Beatriz Pereira de Alvim
11. Leonor de Alvim
1. Fernando II, Duke of Braganza
12. Pedro de Castro, 1st Lord of Cadaval
6. João de Castro, 2nd Lord of Cadaval
13. Leonor de Meneses
3. Joana de Castro, 3rd Lady of Cadaval
14. Martim Vasques da Cunha, 1st Count of Valência de Campos
7. Leonor da Cunha
15. Teresa Téllez-Girón y Ruíz

== See also ==
- Duke of Guimarães
- List of dukes of Braganza

== Bibliography ==
- Marques, Antonio Henrique R. de Oliveira (1976). History of Portugal. New York: Columbia University Press. ISBN 0-231-08353-X.
- McMurdo, Edward (1889a). The history of Portugal, from the Commencement of the Monarchy to the Reign of Alfonso III. Vol. II. London: Sampson Low, Marston, Searle, & Rivington.
- McMurdo, Edward (1889b). The history of Portugal, from the Commencement of the Monarchy to the Reign of Alfonso III. Vol. III. London: Sampson Low, Marston, Searle, & Rivington.
- Pereira, Esteves; Rodrigues, Guilherme (1904). Portugal : diccionario historico, chorographico, heraldico, biographico, bibliographico, numismatico e artistico (in Portuguese). Vol. II. Lisboa: J. Romano Torres. pp. 458–460.
- Sanceau, Elaine (1970). Reign of the Fortunate King, 1495–1521: Manuel I of Portugal. Hamden, Conn.: Archon Books. ISBN 0-2080096-8-X.
- Stephens, H. Morse (1891). The Story of Portugal. New York: G. P. Putnam's Sons.
- Nobreza de Portugal e do Brasil (in Portuguese). Vol. II. Lisbon: Zairol Lda. 1989. pp. 440–442.

Fernando II, Duke of Braganza House of Braganza Cadet branch of the House of Aviz Born: 1430 Died: 1483
Portuguese nobility
Preceded by Fernando I	Duke of Braganza; Marquis of Vila Viçosa; Count of Barcelos, Ourém, Neiva, and Arraiolos; 1478–1483	Succeeded by Jaime I
Preceded by New Title	Duke of Guimarães; 1475–1483	Succeeded by Jaime I
