= Álvaro Soares da Cunha =

Illegitimate son of Alfonso V of Portugal

Alvaro Soares da Cunha (c. 1466–1557) was the natural born son of Afonso V of Portugal, and Maria Soares da Cunha, the recently widowed daughter of Afonso's major valet, Fernão de Sá Alcoforado, and his wife Maria da Cunha.

== Early life ==
Álvaro was born at the Quinta de Paço de Pombal in Vila Boa de Quires in the district of Porto to the widowed, 20-year-old Maria Soares da Cunha in her aunt's home. After the death of her aunt and uncle, Maria and Álvaro were later cared for by her cousin, Pedro da Cunha Coutinho in Celorico de Basto. Álvaro received recognition from King Afonso V in 1476 when he was visiting Vila Nova de Alvito when Álvaro was 10 years old.

== Professional career ==
Álvaro was made "Guarda-Mor de Peste" (Major Guard of Pestilence) within the city of Porto, Lord of the House of Quintães in the town of São Vicente de Pinheiro in the municipality of Penafiel in Porto, and a gentleman of the Royal House. He was listed as vereador (alderman) of the city of Porto in 1508.

== Personal life ==
Álvaro first married Maria Machado, without issue, and then Inês da Mota, with offspring.

== Death ==
He died in 1557 at the age of 91.
