= Battle of Marseille–Nice (1451) =

- Part of Voyage of Eleanor of Portugal
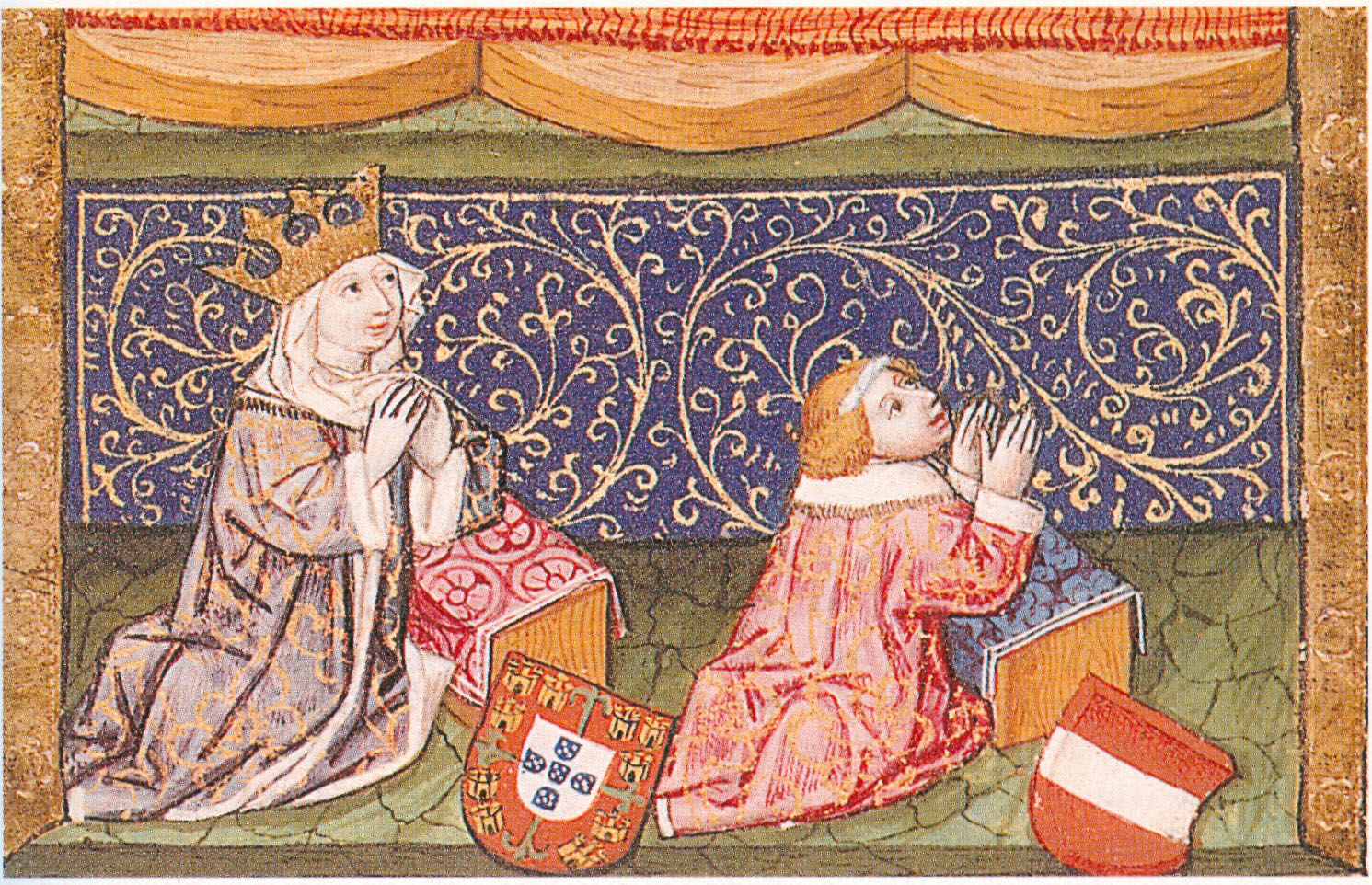
- Miniature depicting Eleanor of Portugal (left)
Date	December 1451
Location	Off Marseille and near Nice
Result	Portuguese victory

Belligerents
Portugal	Pirates

Commanders and leaders
Marquis of Valença	Unknown

Strength
2 warships 5 smaller ships 2 caravels 3,000 men	3 ships and 2 galleys (Marseille); Many small boats and over 100 armed men (Nice)

Casualties and losses
9 killed 16 wounded	1 ship burned 1 ship sunk 2 ships captured

The Battle of Marseille–Nice (1451) were two naval actions fought between a Portuguese fleet against Pirates in December 1451 off Marseille and near Nice, during the voyage escorting Princess Eleanor of Portugal to Italy.
