= Catherine of Portugal (nun) =

Portuguese princess and nun (1436–1463)

Catarina
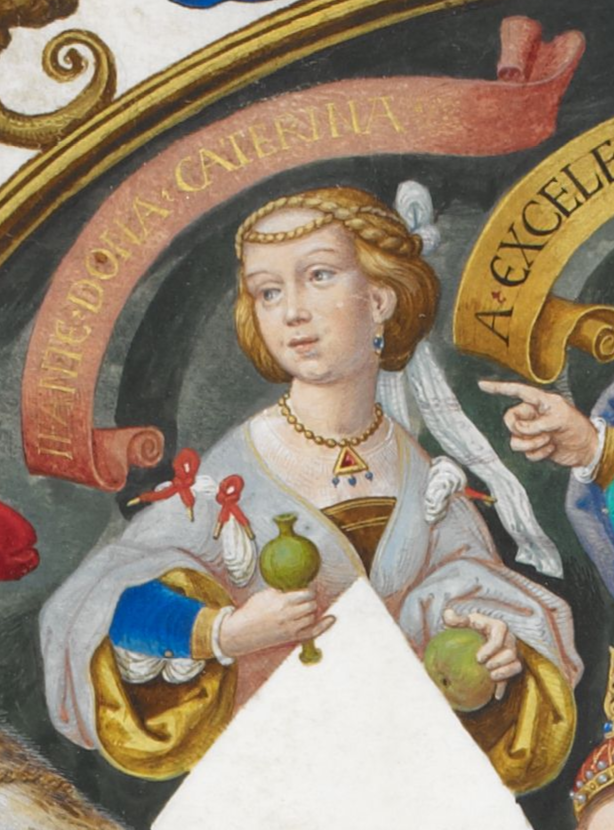
- Infanta Catarina in Genealogia dos Reis de Portugal (António de Holanda; 1530–1534)
- Born: 26 November 1436
- Died: 17 June 1463 (aged 26)
- Burial: Carmo Convent, Lisbon
- House: Aviz
- Father: Edward, King of Portugal
- Mother: Eleanor of Aragon
- Religion: Roman Catholicism

Infanta Catarina (26 November 1436 – 17 June 1463); (Portuguese pronunciation: [kɐtɐˈɾinɐ]; English: Catherine) was a Portuguese infanta (princess), daughter of King Edward of Portugal and Eleanor of Aragon.

== Life ==
Catherine was born in Lisbon on 26 November 1436. Like her sisters Joan and Eleanor she was considered ambitious, shrewd and willful. She was promised to marry Charles IV of Navarre but he died before the marriage could take place and her brother, after securing the marriages of her sisters to the King of Castile and the Holy Roman Emperor, had no further need of marriage alliances with other houses. Thus, Catherine turned to a religious life in the Convent of Saint Claire. She was a cultivated author of many books regarding morality and religion. She died on 17 June 1463 and is buried in Lisbon at the Carmo Convent.

== Ancestry ==
Ancestors of Catherine of Portugal

8. Peter I of Portugal
4. John I of Portugal
9. Teresa Lourenço
2. Edward, King of Portugal
10. John of Gaunt, 1st Duke of Lancaster
5. Philippa of Lancaster
11. Blanche of Lancaster
1. Catherine of Portugal
12. John I of Castile
6. Ferdinand I of Aragon
13. Eleanor of Aragon
3. Eleanor of Aragon
14. Sancho of Castile
7. Eleanor of Alburquerque
15. Beatrice of Portugal
