= Castle of Vila Viçosa =

Castle in Portugal

- Castelo de Vila Viçosa
- Évora, Alentejo Central, Alentejo in Portugal
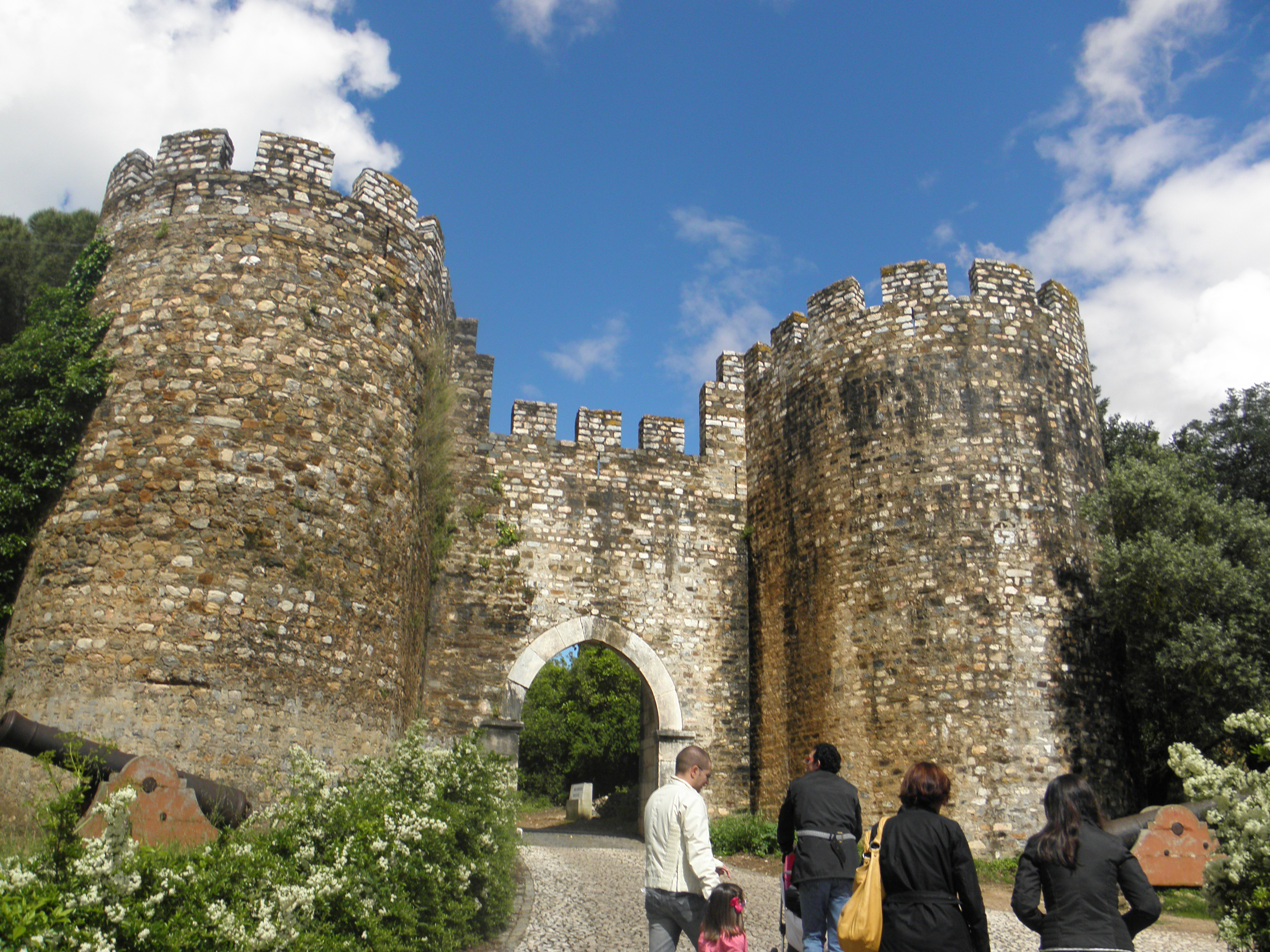
- View of one of the entrances of the Castle of Vila Viçosa

Site information
- Type: Castle
- Owner: Portuguese Republic
- Open to the public: Public

Location
- Coordinates: 38°46′48.98″N 7°24′54.25″W

Site history
- Built: 14th Century

Castle of Vila Viçosa (Portuguese: Castelo de Vila Viçosa/Castelo e cerca urbana de Vila Viçosa) is a castle located in the civil parish of Nossa Senhora da Conceição e São Bartolomeu, in the municipality of Vila Viçosa, in the Portuguese Alentejo. It was the seat of House of Braganza, prior to the construction of the Ducal Palace of Vila Viçosa.
