= Joan of Portugal =

Queen of Castile and León from 1455 to 1474

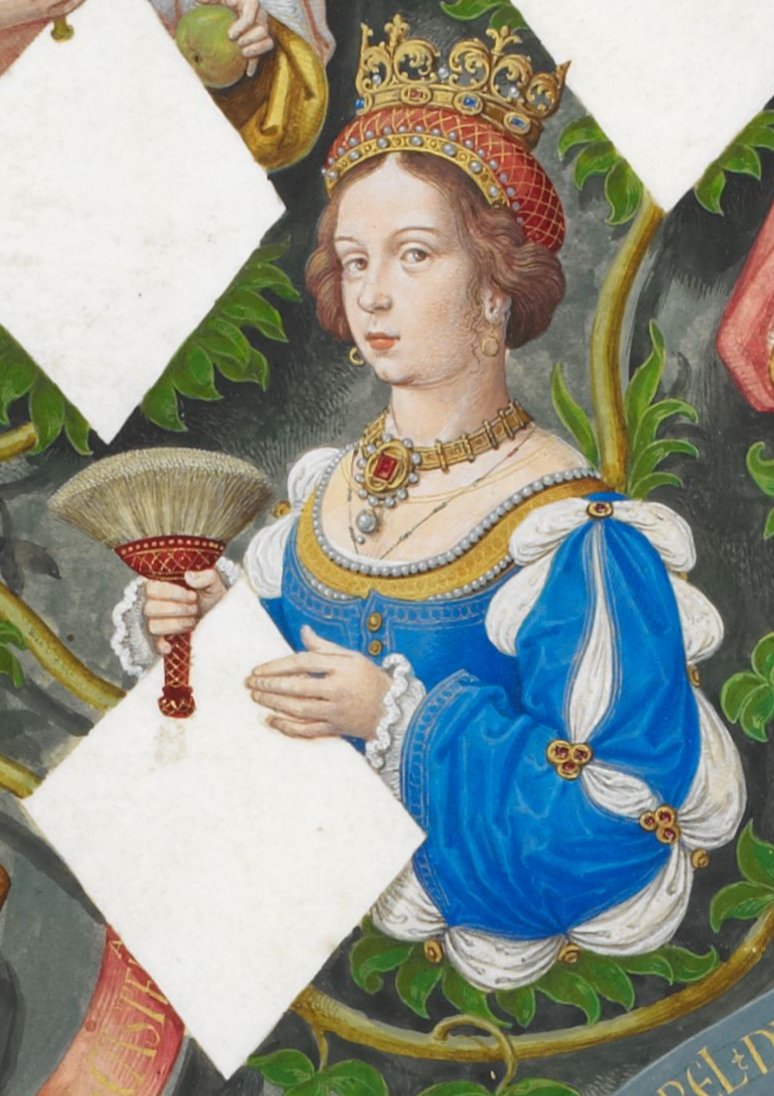
- Queen Joan in Genealogia dos Reis de Portugal (António de Holanda; 1530–1534)

Queen consort of Castile and León
- Tenure: 21 May 1455 – 11 December 1474
- Born: 31 March 1439; Mount Olivete Villa, Almada, Portugal
- Died: 13 June 1475 (aged 36); Madrid, Castile
- Burial: Basilica of San Francisco el Grande, Madrid, Spain
- Spouse: Henry IV of Castile (m. 1455; ann. 1468)
- Issue: Joanna, Queen of Portugal; Illegitimate: Pedro Apostol de Castilla y Portugal; Andres Apostol de Castilla y Portugal
- House: Aviz
- Father: Edward, King of Portugal
- Mother: Eleanor of Aragon

Joan of Portugal (Portuguese: Joana [ʒuˈɐnɐ]; 31 March 1439 – 13 June 1475) was the Queen of Castile as the second wife of King Henry IV of Castile. The posthumous daughter of King Edward of Portugal and Eleanor of Aragon, she was born in the Quinta do Monte Olivete Villa, Almada.

== Early life ==
Joan was born as one of nine children of King Edward of Portugal and his wife Eleanor of Aragon. Joan was born on 31 March 1439 at Quinta do Monte Olivete (modern-day Almada), after her father's death.

In 1440, Eleanor was politically outmaneuvered from the regency of Joan's brother Afonso and was forced into exile in Castile together with the infant Joan. In Castile, Joan and her mother lived at the monastery of Santa María de Medina del Campo, dependent on charity. Joan's mother was deeply unhappy as she longed for the children she had to leave behind in Portugal. In 1444, Eleanor applied for them to return to Portugal, but she died in February 1445 at Toledo. There were rumors that she had been poisoned.

After her mother's death, Joan was taken under the guardianship of her uncle Peter and was raised at court in Lisbon.

== Queen of Castile ==
On 21 May 1455 in Cordoba, she married King Henry IV of Castile, who had his first marriage to Blanche II of Navarre annulled after thirteen years of marriage. It was rumoured that their marriage had never been consummated due to the king's impotence. Henry and Joan shared the same maternal grandparents; Ferdinand I of Aragon and Eleanor of Alburquerque (making them first cousins). They also shared the same paternal great-grandfather; John of Gaunt, 1st Duke of Lancaster (making them second cousins).

Though a bride without a significant dowry, Joan had valuable connections to offer Henry. Apart from being the sister of the king of Portugal, she also had influential relatives, such as her older sister Eleanor, Holy Roman Empress, and their paternal aunt Isabella, Duchess of Burgundy.

In February 1462, six years after Joan's marriage to Henry, she gave birth to a daughter, also named Joan, called La Beltraneja because of rumours that she was in fact the daughter of Don Beltrán de la Cueva, 1st Duke of Alburquerque, who was suspected of being Joan's lover.

Henry banished Joan from the royal court and she went to live in Coca at the castle of Henry's supporter, Bishop Fonseca. She soon fell in love with Bishop Fonseca's nephew; they embarked on a sexual affair, which resulted in Joan bearing her lover two illegitimate sons. Henry subsequently declared their marriage had never been legal and thus divorced her in 1468.

At the death of her former husband in 1474, Joan championed her daughter's right to succeed to the throne, but she died shortly thereafter. This led to the outbreak of the War of the Castilian Succession (1475–1479).

== Scandals and illegitimate children ==
Prior to her banishment, Joan had provoked much criticism in the Castilian court as she allegedly wore dresses that displayed too much décolletage, and her philandering with men was considered scandalous. She was considered haughty, unscrupulous, ambitious and ruthless, participating in intrigues and completely controlling her husband. Joan has been credited with many lovers, including the poet Juan Rodríguez de la Cámara. Joan had two illegitimate children by Pedro de Castilla y Fonseca "el mozo", nephew of Bishop Fonseca, and a great grandson of King Pedro of Castille: her two sons were Pedro Apostol de Castilla y Portugal, married to Juana de Mendonza, and Andres Apostol de Castilla y Portugal, married to Mencía de Quiñones. The birth of her two illegitimate children only added to Joan's considerable notoriety.

She later entered the convent of San Francisco in Segovia.

Joan died in Madrid on June 13, 1475 at the age of 36. She was buried in the convent of San Francisco.

Coat of arms as queen consort

Coat of arms as queen dowager

== Ancestry ==
Ancestors of Joan of Portugal

8. Peter I of Portugal
4. John I of Portugal
9. Teresa Lourenço
2. Edward I of Portugal
10. John of Gaunt, 1st Duke of Lancaster
5. Philippa of Lancaster
11. Blanche of Lancaster
1. Joan of Portugal
12. John I of Castile
6. Ferdinand I of Aragon
13. Eleanor of Aragon
3. Eleanor of Aragon
14. Sancho Alfonso
7. Eleanor of Alburquerque
15. Beatrice of Portugal

Joan of Portugal House of Aviz Cadet branch of the House of Burgundy Born: 20 March 1439 Died: 12 December 1475
Royal titles
Vacant Title last held by Isabella of Portugal	Queen consort of Castile and León; 1455–1474	Vacant Title next held by Isabella of Portugal
