= Afonso V of Portugal =

King of Portugal from 1438 to 1481

Afonso V
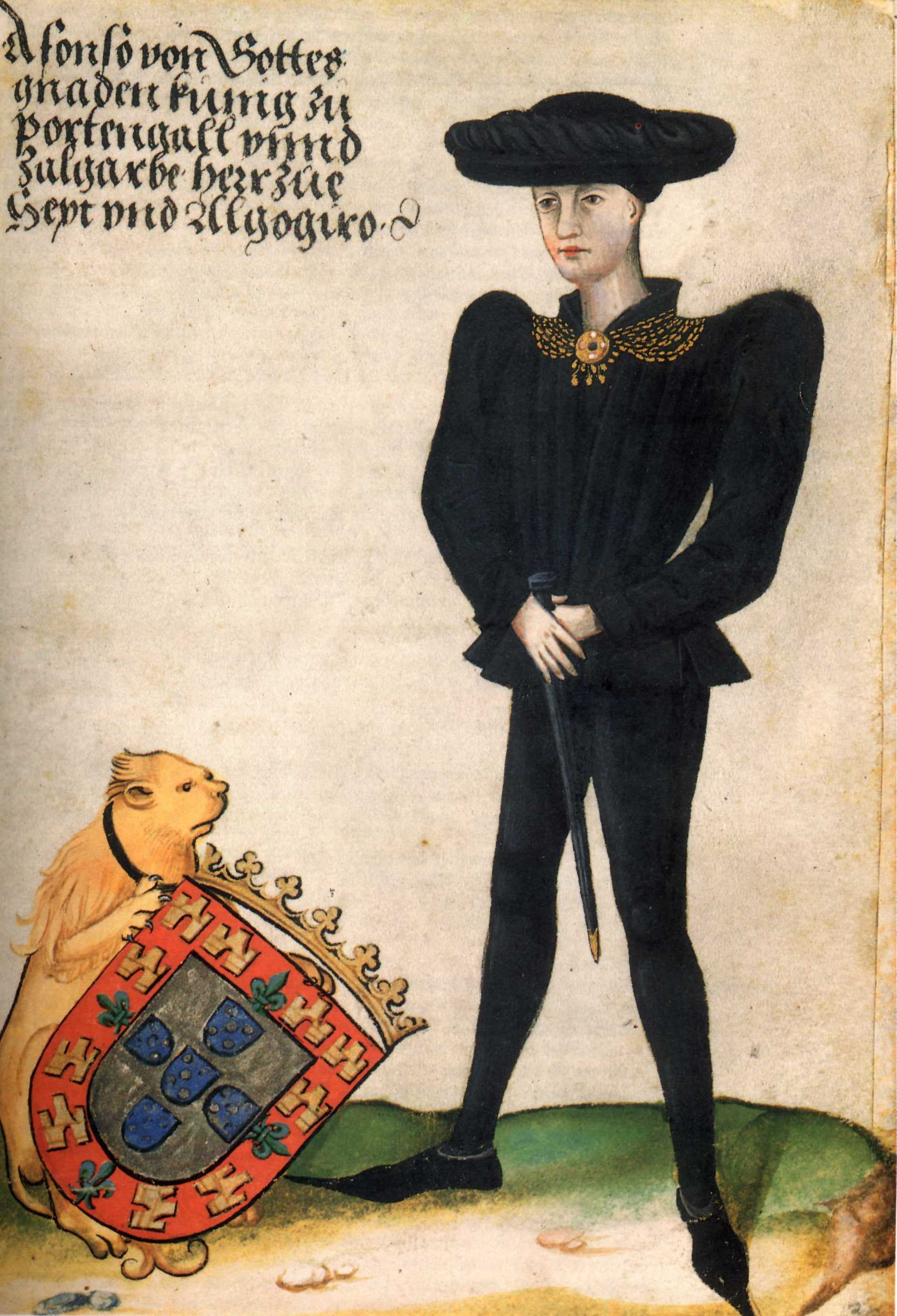
- Portrait, c. 1470

King of Portugal
- Reign: 13 September 1438 – 11 November 1477
- Acclamation: 15 January 1446
- Predecessor: Edward
- Successor: John II
- Regents: Eleanor of Aragon (1438–39); Peter of Coimbra (1439–48)
- Reign: 15 November 1477 – 28 August 1481
- Predecessor: John II
- Successor: John II
- Born: 15 January 1432; Sintra Palace, Portugal
- Died: 28 August 1481 (aged 49); Lisbon, Portugal
- Burial: Batalha Monastery
- Spouses: Isabel of Coimbra (m. 1447; died 1455) Joanna "la Beltraneja" (m. 1475)
- Issue: John, Prince of Portugal; Joanna, Princess of Portugal; John II
- House: Aviz
- Father: Edward, King of Portugal
- Mother: Eleanor of Aragon

Afonso V (Note: Rendered as Affonso in Archaic Portuguese) (European Portuguese: [ɐˈfõsu]; 15 January 1432 – 28 August 1481), also known as the African (Portuguese: o Africano), was King of Portugal from 1438 until he died in 1481, with a brief interruption in 1477. The son of Edward, King of Portugal, and Eleanor of Aragon, Afonso acceded to the throne when he was only six years old. His early reign was marked by a struggle over the regency between his mother, Eleanor, and his uncle, Pedro, Duke of Coimbra. Pedro was appointed sole regent in 1439, but the Braganza faction at court continued to challenge his authority. Influenced by his other uncle, Afonso I, Duke of Braganza, the King dismissed Pedro in 1448 and defeated him in the Battle of Alfarrobeira in 1449.

Between 1458 and 1471, Afonso pursued military campaigns in Africa, concentrating efforts predominantly on Morocco. His successful conquests of Alcácer-Ceguer, Arzila, and Tangiers earned him the sobriquet O Africano.

Following the death of Henry IV of Castile in 1474, Afonso claimed the throne of Castile on behalf of his niece, Joanna la Beltraneja. In May 1475, he led an army into Palencia, wed Joanna, and proclaimed himself sovereign of Castile, instigating the War of the Castilian Succession. After the disappointing Battle of Toro and failed attempts at securing support from France, Afonso abdicated the Portuguese throne to embark on a pilgrimage to Jerusalem. He was persuaded to return to Portugal and reassume the crown in November 1477, just days after his heir, John, was declared king.

In the last years of Afonso's reign, the administration of the kingdom was largely directed by John. The Treaty of Alcáçovas, in which Afonso's claim to the throne of Castile was renounced in exchange for Portuguese hegemony in the Atlantic south of the Canary Islands, was signed in 1479. The King died in 1481 and was succeeded by John.

== Early life ==
Born in Sintra on 15 January 1432, Afonso was the second son of Edward, King of Portugal by his wife Eleanor of Aragon. Following the death of his older brother, Infante João (1429–1433), Afonso acceded to the position of heir apparent and was made the first Prince of Portugal by his father, who sought to emulate the English court's custom of a dynastic title that distinguished the heir apparent from the other children of the monarch. He was only six years old when he succeeded his father in 1438.

During his minority, Afonso was placed under the regency of his mother, Eleanor, by the will left by his late father. As both a foreigner and a woman, the queen was not a popular choice for regent. When the cortes met in late 1438, a law was passed requiring a joint regency consisting of Eleanor and Pedro, Duke of Coimbra, the younger brother of the late king. The dual regency was a failure and in 1439, the cortes named Pedro "protector and guardian" of the king and "ruler and defender" of the kingdom. Eleanor attempted to resist, but without support in Portugal she fled to Castile.

Pedro's regency was characterized by political unrest and weakened authority caused by strife with Afonso, Count of Barcelos, his half-brother and political enemy. In 1441, Afonso V's betrothal to Pedro's eldest daughter, Isabella, was arranged. The engagement caused conflict between Pedro and the Count of Barcelos, who had wished for the monarch to marry his granddaughter. Relations further deteriorated when Pedro had his son elected the Constable of Portugal in 1443, a title that the Count of Barcelos believed rightfully belonged to his eldest son, Afonso, Marquis of Valença.

Afonso reached the age of majority in 1446, but Pedro retained administrative power and the title of regent. Afonso and Isabella were formally married on 6 May 1447, seemingly strengthening Pedro's power at court. However, the Count of Barcelos began to wield more influence over the young king and persuaded him to dispense Pedro in July 1448. Shortly after, Pedro retired to Coimbra and Afonso issued an order forbidding him from leaving his estates. The King also warned noblemen not to visit Pedro. On 15 September 1448, Afonso nullified all the laws and edicts approved under the regency. In November or December, he stripped Pedro's son of the title of Constable of Portugal. In early 1449, Afonso interpreted Pedro's refusal to yield all arms as an act of rebellion and began preparing for civil war.

On 5 May 1449, Pedro began marching his ducal army towards Lisbon. He was eventually defeated and killed by Afonso V's royal forces in the Battle of Alfarrobeira on 20 May 1449.

== Rule ==
=== Administration ===
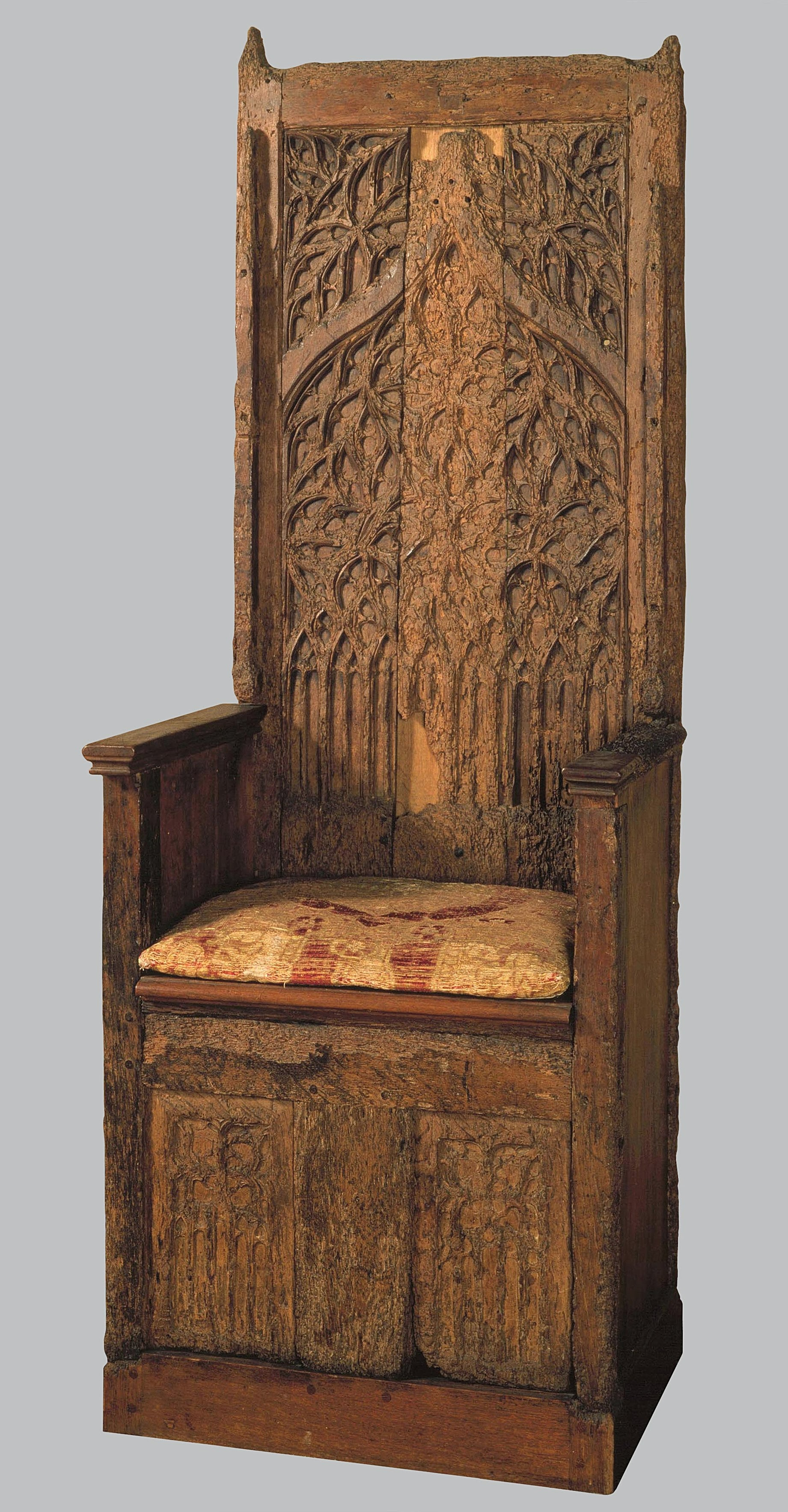
Throne of Afonso V

Afonso financially supported the exploration of the Atlantic Ocean led by his uncle Prince Henry the Navigator. In February 1449, he granted Henry a monopoly over navigation in the African Atlantic between Cape Cantin and Bojador. The grant caused conflict with John II of Castile, who asserted that conquest of Barbary and Guinea were reserved for the Castilian crown. John II was also angered by Henry's conduct in the Canary Islands and repeatedly wrote to Afonso complaining about displays of hostility, such as attacks on Castilian shipping. Tensions finally deescalated with the marriage of Afonso's youngest sister, Joan, to John II's heir, Henry, in 1455.

In 1452, Pope Nicholas V issued the papal bull Dum Diversas, which granted Afonso V the right to reduce "Saracens, pagans and any other unbelievers" to hereditary slavery. This was reaffirmed and extended in the Romanus Pontifex bull of 1455 (also by Nicholas V). These papal bulls came to be seen by some as a justification for the subsequent era of the slave trade and European colonialism.

After Henry died in 1460, his nephew Ferdinand inherited his titles and rights but the monopoly over trade reverted to the crown. In 1469, Afonso V granted Fernão Gomes the monopoly of trade in the Gulf of Guinea, provided that Gomes pay an annual rent of 200,000 reais and explore 100 leagues of the coast of Africa per year.

=== Invasion of Morocco ===
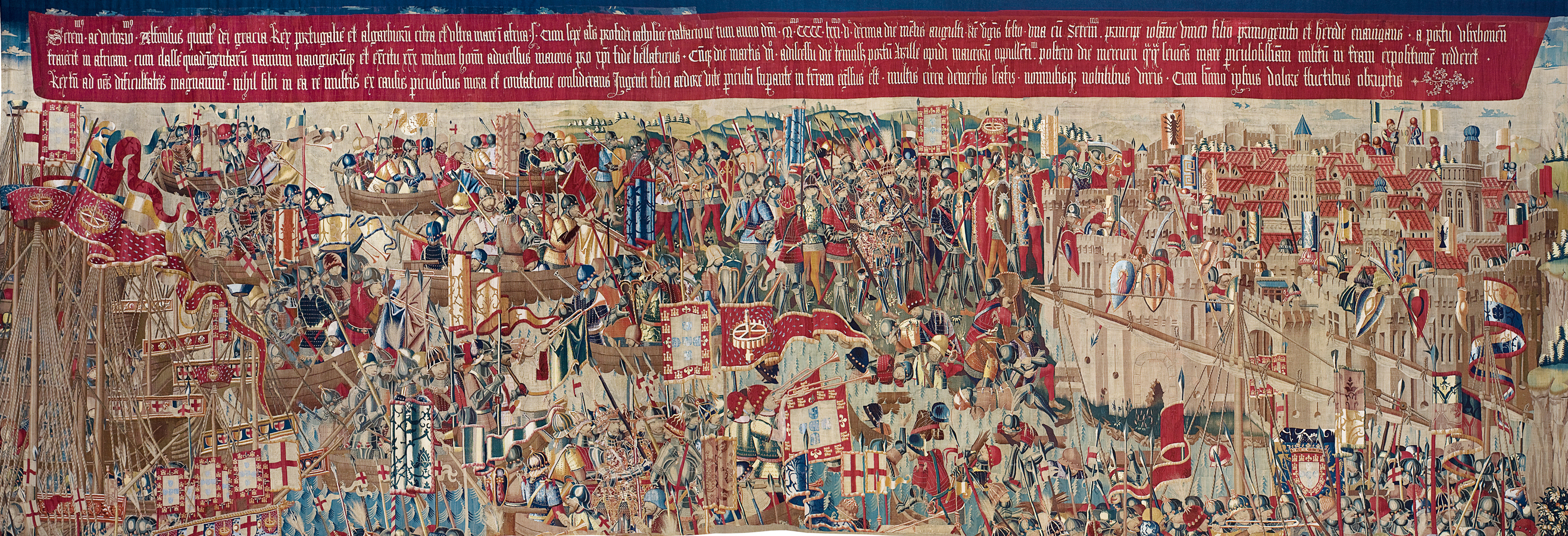
Conquest of Arzila in 1471

Afonso V's interest in Africa was sparked by a desire to support Papal efforts against Islam, especially after the fall of Constantinople in 1453. A large crusade was desired but the Papacy struggled to rally the necessary forces and Afonso, having already made war preparations in Portugal, saw an opportunity to pursue military campaigns in Africa.

In 1458, Afonso V, leading an expeditionary force of 25,000 men, assaulted and captured the town of Alcácer Ceguer. After the conquest, he gave himself the title "king of Portugal and the Algarves", where the plural form of Algarve was meant to refer to both the original Kingdom of the Algarve in southern Portugal as well as the new territories in Africa. For the next two decades, the Portuguese nobility and crown concentrated their efforts primarily on Morocco. Between November 1463 and April 1464, Afonso made multiple unsuccessful attempts to seize Tangiers from the Marinids. In August 1471, he launched another campaign to capture the city, but his fleet was diverted by a storm to the port of Arzila. After a fierce battle, Arzila was captured. Subsequently, the nearby population of Tangiers fled and the city fell into Portuguese control. Consequently, the Portuguese controlled the North African coast from Ceuta to Tangiers. Afonso's victories earned him the nickname of the African or O Africano.

=== War with Castile ===
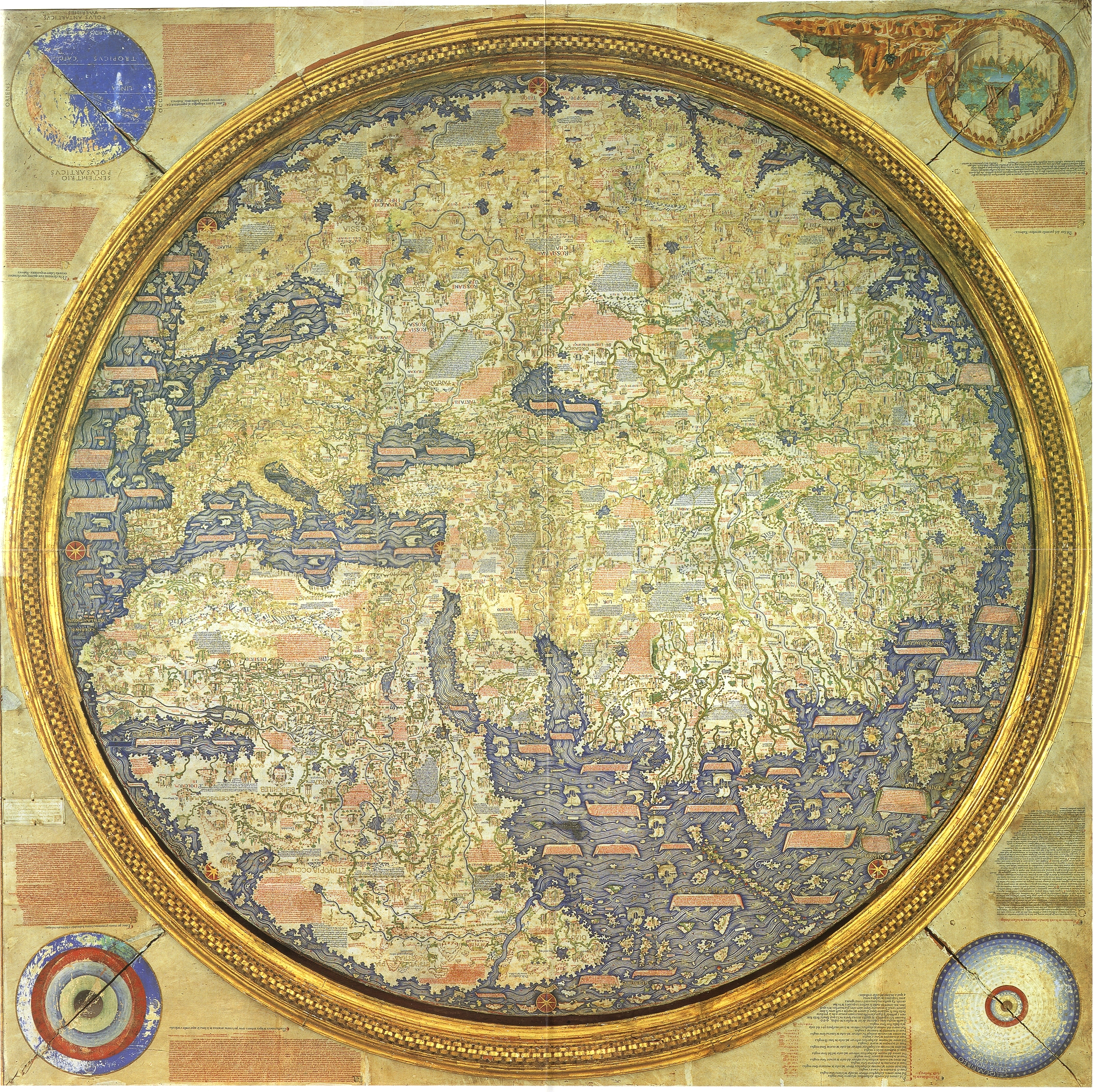
A copy of the Fra Mauro map was commissioned by Afonso V in 1457. Finished on 24 April 1459, it was sent to Portugal with a letter to Prince Henry the Navigator, Afonso's uncle, encouraging further funding of exploration trips. Although the copy has been lost, the Andrea Bianco original is preserved at the Biblioteca Marciana in Venice.

Following his campaigns in Africa, Afonso V found new grounds for battle in neighboring Castile. On 11 December 1474 King Henry IV of Castile died without a male heir, leaving just one daughter, Joanna. However, her paternity was questioned; it was rumored that his wife, Queen Joan of Portugal (Afonso's sister) had an affair with a nobleman named Beltrán de La Cueva. The death of Henry ignited a war of succession, with one faction supporting Joanna and the other supporting Isabella, Henry's half-sister. Afonso V was persuaded to intervene on behalf of Joanna, his niece.

On 12 May 1475 Afonso entered Castile with an army of 5,600 cavalry and 14,000 foot soldiers. He met Joanna in Palencia and the two were betrothed and proclaimed sovereigns of Castile on 25 May. The formal marriage was delayed because their close blood relationship necessitated a papal dispensation.

In March 1476, after several skirmishes and much maneuvering, the 8,000 men of Afonso and Prince John, faced a Castilian force of similar size in the Battle of Toro. The Castilians were led by Isabella's husband, Prince Ferdinand II of Aragon, Cardinal Mendoza and the Duke of Alba. The fight was fierce and confusing but the result was a stalemate: while the forces of Cardinal Mendoza and the Duke of Alba won over their opponents led by the Portuguese king—who left the battlefield to take refuge in Castronuño—the troops commanded by Prince John defeated and persecuted the troops of the Castilian right wing and recovered the Portuguese royal standard, remaining ordered in the battlefield where they collected the fugitives of Afonso. Both sides claimed victory, but Afonso's prospects for obtaining the Castilian crown were severely damaged.

After the battle, Afonso sailed to France hoping to obtain the assistance of King Louis XI in his fight against Castile. In September 1477, disheartened that his efforts to secure support had proved fruitless, Afonso abdicated the throne and embarked on a pilgrimage to Jerusalem. He was eventually persuaded to return to Portugal, where he arrived in November 1477. Prince John had been proclaimed king days prior to Afonso's arrival, but relinquished his new title and insisted that his father reassume the crown.

=== Final years and death ===
From 1477 to 1481, Afonso V and Prince John were "practically co-rulers." Afonso made preparations for a second invasion of Castile in winter 1478, but was deterred by Castilian Hermandad forces. The Treaty of Alcáçovas was finally negotiated in 1479, wherein Afonso renounced his claim to the Castilian throne in exchange for Portuguese hegemony in the Atlantic south of the Canary Islands. Although the treaty was advantageous for Portugal, the king was deeply unhappy with the provision that forced his bride and niece, Joanna, into a convent. Withdrawn and melancholic, he announced his intention to abdicate (Note: Afonso died before the Cortes assembled to confirm his abdication.) for a second time and retired to a monastery in Sintra. He died of fever shortly after, on 28 August 1481.

== Issue ==
Afonso had three children with his first wife Isabella of Coimbra:

- John, Prince of Portugal (29 January 1451)
- Joan, Princess of Portugal (6 February 1452 – 12 May 1490) – known as Saint Joan of Portugal, or Saint Joan Princes
- John II of Portugal (3 March 1455 – 25 October 1495) – succeeded his father as the 13th King of Portugal

He had one illegitimate child with Maria Soares da Cunha:

- Álvaro Soares da Cunha (1466–1557), Noble of the Royal House, Lord of the House of Quintas in Sao Vicente de Pinheiro, Porto and Chief Guard of Pestilence in Porto

== Ancestry ==
Ancestors of Afonso V of Portugal

8. Peter I of Portugal
4. John I of Portugal
9. Teresa Lourenço
2. Edward, King of Portugal
10. John of Gaunt, 1st Duke of Lancaster
5. Philippa of Lancaster
11. Blanche of Lancaster
1. Afonso V of Portugal
12. John I of Castile
6. Ferdinand I of Aragon
13. Eleanor of Aragon
3. Eleanor of Aragon
14. Sancho Alfonso, 1st Count of Alburquerque
7. Eleanor of Alburquerque
15. Beatrice of Portugal

== Notes ==
Afonso V of Portugal House of Aviz Cadet branch of the House of Burgundy Born: 15 January 1432 Died: 28 August 1481
Regnal titles
Preceded by Edward	King of Portugal; 1438–1477	Succeeded by John II
Preceded by John II	King of Portugal; 1477–1481	Succeeded by John II
Portuguese royalty
New title	Prince of Portugal; 1433–1438	Succeeded by Infante Ferdinand
