= Eleanor of Aragon, Queen of Portugal =

Queen of Portugal from 1433 to 1438

Eleanor of Aragon
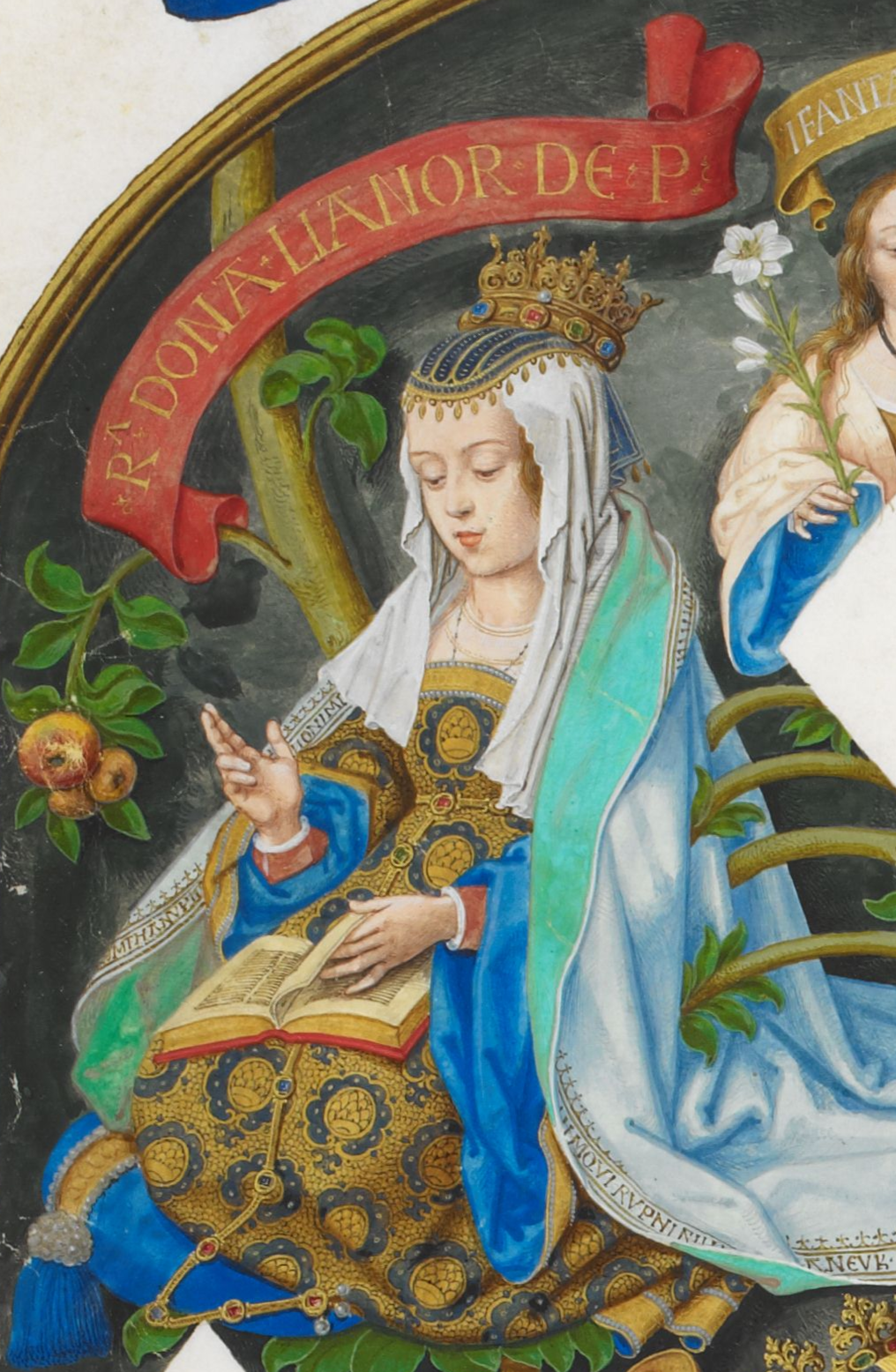
- Queen Leonor in Genealogia dos Reis de Portugal (António de Holanda; 1530-1534)

Queen consort of Portugal
- Tenure: 14 August 1433 – 9 September 1438
- Coronation: 15 August 1433
- Born: c. 1405; Medina del Campo
- Died: 19 February 1445 (aged 39–40); Toledo
- Burial: Batalha Monastery
- Spouse: Edward, King of Portugal (m. 1428; died 1438)
- Issue: Afonso V, King of Portugal; Infante Ferdinand, Duke of Viseu; Eleanor, Holy Roman Empress; Infanta Catherine; Joan, Queen of Castile
- House: Trastámara
- Father: Ferdinand I of Aragon
- Mother: Eleanor of Alburquerque

Eleanor of Aragon (c. 1405 – 19 February 1445) was Queen of Portugal from 1433 to 1438 as the spouse of King Edward. After Edward's death, she served as regent in 1438–1440 for her son Afonso V. She was the daughter of Ferdinand I of Aragon and Eleanor of Alburquerque.

== Biography ==
Born c. 1405 in Castile, Eleanor accompanied her parents to Aragon after Ferdinand succeeded to the Aragonese throne in 1412. She moved back to Castile with her mother following Ferdinand's death in 1417.

Eleanor's brother, Alfonso V of Aragon, arranged her marriage to the future King Edward of Portugal. The wedding ceremony took place on 22 September 1428 in Coimbra. The couple had nine children, of whom five survived to adulthood. In 1433, Eleanor became Queen of Portugal.

When her husband died on 9 September 1438, Eleanor was appointed regent of Portugal in his will, which was supported by the Portuguese Cortes. However, as a woman and a foreigner, she was unpopular with the people, who preferred the late king's brother Infante Peter, Duke of Coimbra. Her appointment as regent therefore caused a riot in Lisbon. The riot was suppressed by her brother Count John of Barcelona, later King John II of Aragon. Eleanor was supported by the nobility and the will, while Peter was supported by a fraction of the nobility and by the people. Negotiations for a compromise arrangement were drawn out over several months. Eleanor was at first prepared to divide the regency between herself and Peter, but the interference of the Count of Barcelos and other nobles that sided with her complicated matters and she was ultimately dissuaded. In March 1439, Eleanor gave birth to a posthumous daughter, Joan, and her eldest daughter, Philippa, died. Eleanor's poor health and grief from losing her daughter caused her to withdraw from state affairs, further enraging the people.

Eventually, the Cortes appointed Peter the sole regent. Eleanor continued conspiring, but decided to flee to Castile in December 1440, bringing her infant daughter Joan with her.

Dependent on charity and longing to be reunited with her children, Eleanor was deeply unhappy in Castile. In 1444, she applied to return to Portugal, but died at Toledo in February 1445. There were rumors that she was poisoned. In 1457, Afonso V ordered the transfer of her remains to Batalha, Portugal, where she is now buried alongside her husband in the Batalha Monastery.

== Issue ==
Eleanor had a total of nine children, five of whom survived to adulthood.

1. Infante John, 15 October 1429 – 14 August 1433.
2. Infanta Philippa, 27 November 1430 – 24 March 1439.
3. Afonso V of Portugal 15 January 1432 – 28 August 1481; who succeeded Edward as 12th King of Portugal.
4. Infanta Maria, 7 December 1432 – 8 December 1432.
5. Infante Ferdinand, 17 November 1433 – 18 September 1470; Duke of Viseu and father of future king Manuel I of Portugal.
6. Infanta Eleanor, 18 September 1434 – 3 September 1467; married Frederick III, Holy Roman Emperor.
7. Infante Edward, 12 July 1435 – 12 July 1435.
8. Infanta Catherine, 26 November 1436 – 17 June 1463.
9. Infanta Joan, 31 March 1439 – 13 June 1475; married King Henry IV of Castile.

Portuguese royalty
Preceded by Philippa of Lancaster	Queen consort of Portugal; 14 August 1433 – 13 September 1438	Succeeded by Isabel of Coimbra
