= Edward, King of Portugal =

King of Portugal from 1433 to 1438

Edward
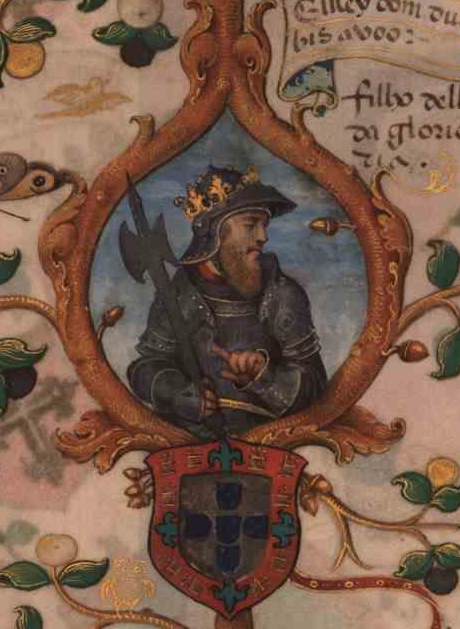

King of Portugal
- Reign: 14 August 1433 – 9 September 1438
- Predecessor: John I
- Successor: Afonso V
- Born: 31 October 1391; Viseu, Portugal
- Died: 9 September 1438 (aged 46); Tomar, Portugal
- Burial: Monastery of Batalha
- Spouse: Eleanor of Aragon (m. 1428)
- Issue: Afonso V, King of Portugal; Infante Ferdinand, Duke of Viseu; Eleanor, Holy Roman Empress; Infanta Catherine; Joan, Queen of Castile
- House: Aviz
- Father: John I of Portugal
- Mother: Philippa of Lancaster

Edward (Portuguese: Duarte (Note: Rendered as Eduarte (and occasionally Eduarde) in Archaic Portuguese. Latinized as Eduardus in his own written works.) [duˈaɾt(ɨ)]; 31 October 1391 – 9 September 1438), also called Edward the Philosopher King (Duarte o Rei-Filósofo) or the Eloquent (o Eloquente), was the King of Portugal from 1433 until his death. He was born in Viseu, the son of John I of Portugal and Philippa of Lancaster. Edward was the oldest member of the "Illustrious Generation" of royal children who contributed to the political, social and economic development of Portuguese society during the 15th century.

== Early life ==
Edward was the second born male legitimate son of King John I. He became the heir to the throne after his brother Afonso died in 1400, aged 10.

Before he ascended to the throne, Edward always followed his father in the affairs of the kingdom. He was knighted in 1415 after the Portuguese capture of the city of Ceuta in North Africa, across from Gibraltar. He became king in 1433, when his father died of the plague.

As king, Edward soon showed interest in building internal political consensus. During his short reign of five years, he called the Portuguese Cortes (the national assembly) no less than five times to discuss the political affairs of his kingdom. He also followed the politics of his father concerning the maritime exploration of Africa. He encouraged and financed his famous brother, Henry the Navigator, who initiated many expeditions on the west coast of Africa. An expedition of Gil Eanes in 1434 first rounded Cape Bojador on the northwestern coast of Africa, leading the way for further exploration southward along the African coast.

== Colonial affairs ==
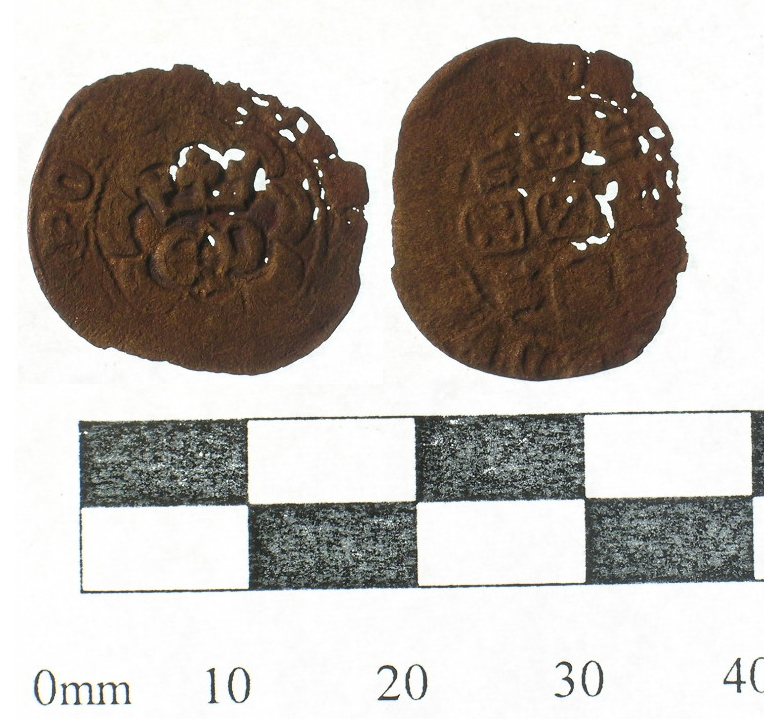
Coin of King Edward

The colony at Ceuta rapidly became a drain on the Portuguese treasury, and it was realised that without the city of Tangier, possession of Ceuta was worthless. After Ceuta was captured by the Portuguese, the camel caravans that were part of the overland trade routes began to use Tangier as their new destination. This deprived Ceuta of the materials and goods that made it an attractive market and a vibrant trading locale, and it became an isolated community.

In 1437, Edward's brothers Henry and Ferdinand persuaded him to launch an attack on the Marinid sultanate of Morocco. The expedition was not unanimously supported and was undertaken against the advice of the Pope. Infante Peter, Duke of Coimbra, and the Infante John were both against the initiative; they preferred to avoid conflict with the Marinid Sultan. Their instincts proved to be justified. The resulting Battle of Tangier, led by Henry, was a debacle. Failing to take the city in a series of assaults, the Portuguese siege camp was soon itself surrounded and starved into submission by a Moroccan relief army. In the resulting treaty, Henry promised to deliver Ceuta back to the Marinids in return for allowing the Portuguese army to depart unmolested. Ferdinand, the youngest brother of Edward, was handed over to the Marinids as a hostage for the final handover of the city.

== Late life ==
The debacle at Tangier dominated the final year of Edward's life. Peter and John urged him to fulfill the treaty, yield Ceuta and secure Ferdinand's release, whereas Henry (despite having signed the treaty) urged him to renege on it. Caught in indecision, Edward assembled the Portuguese Cortes at Leiria in early 1438 for consultation. The Cortes refused to ratify the treaty, preferring to hang on to Ceuta and requesting that Edward find some other means of obtaining Ferdinand's release.

Edward died later that summer, in Tomar, of the plague, like his father and mother (and her mother) before him. Popular lore suggested he died of heartbreak over the fate of his hapless brother; Ferdinand would remain captive in Fez until his own death in 1443.

== Legacy ==
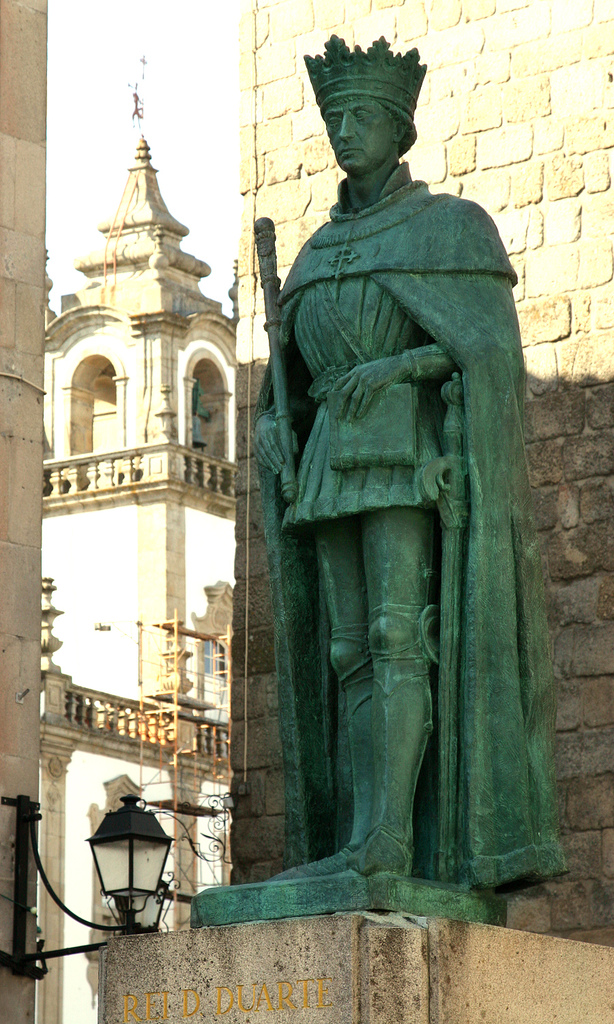
Statue of King Edward in Viseu, by Álvaro de Brée, 1955

Edward's premature death provoked a political crisis in Portugal. Leaving only a young son, Afonso, to inherit the throne, it was generally assumed that Edward's brothers would take over the regency of the realm. But Edward's will appointed his unpopular foreign wife, Eleanor of Aragon, as regent. A popular uprising followed, in which the burghers of the realm, assembled by John of Reguengos, acclaimed Peter of Coimbra as regent. But the nobles backed Eleanor's claim, and threatened civil war. The regency crisis was defused by a complicated and tense power-sharing arrangement between Eleanor and Peter.

Another less political side of Edward's personality is related to culture. A reflective and scholarly infante, he wrote the treatises O Leal Conselheiro (The Loyal Counsellor) and Livro Da Ensinança De Bem Cavalgar Toda Sela ("Book of Teachings on Riding Well on Every Saddle") as well as several poems. He was in the process of revising the Portuguese law code when he died.

== Marriages and descendants ==
Edward married Eleanor of Aragon, daughter of Ferdinand I of Aragon and Eleanor of Alburquerque, in 1428. They had nine children:

Name	Birth	Death	Notes
By Eleanor of Aragon (c. 1402–19 February 1445); married on 2 September 1428)
Infante John	15 October 1429	14 August 1433	Prince of Portugal.
Infanta Philippa	27 November 1430	24 March 1439	Died aged nine.
Infante Afonso	15 January 1432	28 August 1481	Who succeeded him as Afonso V, King of Portugal.
Infanta Maria	7 December 1432	8 December 1432	Died in infancy.
Infante Ferdinand	17 November 1433	18 September 1470	Duke of Viseu. He was declared heir to his brother Afonso V for two brief periods, and therefore used the style of Prince instead of Infante. He was the father of future king Manuel I.
Eleanor of Portugal	18 September 1434	3 September 1467	Holy Roman Empress by marriage to Frederick III, Holy Roman Emperor.
Infante Duarte	12 July 1435	12 July 1435	Died shortly after being born.
Infanta Catherine	26 November 1436	17 June 1463	She was betrothed to Charles IV of Navarre, but he died before the marriage could take place. After his death, Catherine entered the Convent of Saint Claire and became a nun.
Infanta Joan	20 March 1439	13 June 1475	Queen of Castile by marriage to Henry IV of Castile.

== Ancestry ==
Ancestors of Edward, King of Portugal

8. Afonso IV of Portugal
4. Peter I of Portugal
9. Beatrice of Castile
2. John I of Portugal
10. Lourenço Martins
5. Teresa Lourenço
11. Sancha Martins
1. Edward I of Portugal
12. Edward III, King of England
6. John of Gaunt, 1st Duke of Lancaster
13. Philippa of Hainault
3. Philippa of Lancaster
14. Henry of Grosmont, 1st Duke of Lancaster
7. Blanche of Lancaster
15. Isabel of Beaumont

== Sources ==
- Collins, Hugh E. L. (2000). The Order of the Garter, 1348-1461: Chivalry and Politics in Late Medieval England. Clarendon Press.
- Watanabe, Morimichi (1988). Christianson, Gerald; Izbicki, Thomas M. (eds.). Nicholas of Cusa – A Companion to his Life and his Times. Ashgate Publishing Limited.

Edward, King of Portugal House of Aviz Cadet branch of the House of Burgundy Born: 31 October 1391 Died: 9 September 1438
Regnal titles
Preceded by John I	King of Portugal; 1433–1438	Succeeded by Afonso V
