= Gil Vasques de Soverosa =

- Born: c. 1240
- Died: 1233
- Buried: Monastery of Santa Maria de Pombeiro
- Spouses: Maria Aires de Fornelos; Sancha González de Orbaneja; María González Girón
- Father: Vasco Fernandes de Soverosa
- Mother: Teresa Gonçalves de Sousa

Gil Vázquez de Soverosa (died c. 1240) was a member of the nobility of the Kingdom of Portugal, of the Soverosa lineage which had its origins in Galicia. He appears frequently as a member of the curia regis confirming royal charters of Kings Sancho I, Afonso II, and Afonso III of Portugal.

== Biography ==
His parents were Vasco Fernandes de Soverosa and Teresa Gonçalves de Sousa, daughter of Gonçalo Mendes de Sousa, a patron of the Monastery of Santa Maria de Pombeiro, and Dórdia Viegas. Three of his sons benefited from the Repartimiento after the conquest of Seville in 1248.

Tenente in several places in Portugal, including Barros in 1207; Sousa between 1234 and 1235; Barroso from 1207 to 1240; and, Panóias and Montealegre, he owned numerous properties in the Guimarães region and was Lord of Sobroso Castle in Vilasobroso. Gil Vasques de Soverosa died around 1240 and was buried at the Monastery of Santa Maria de Pombeiro.

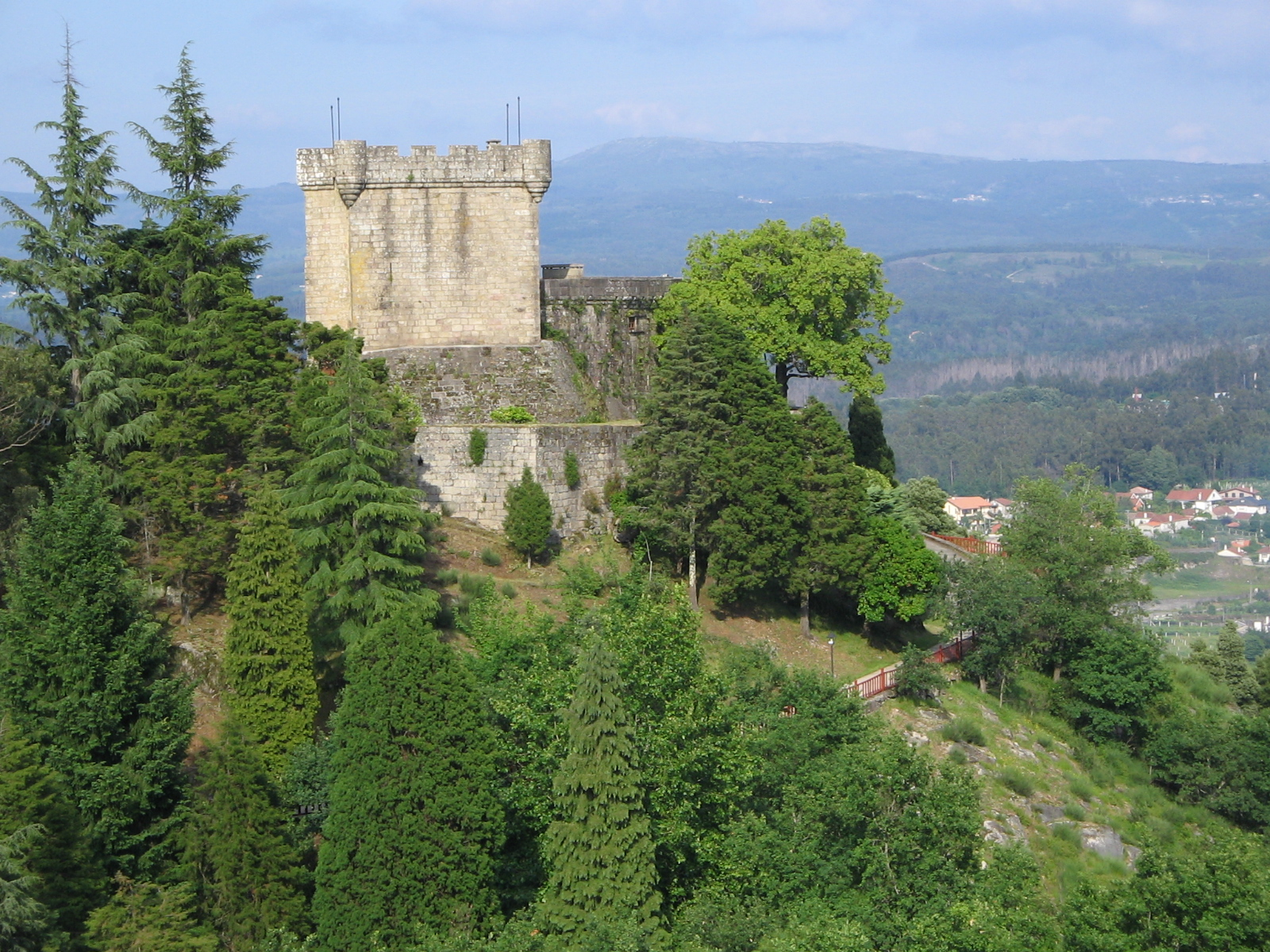
Sobroso Castle

== Marriage and issue ==
He married three times. The first marriage was before April 1175 with Maria Aires de Fornelos, who died around 1212. (Note: She appears at the Monastery of Santo Tirso in April 1175 with Urraca and Martim Sanches making a donation to some relatives, which shows that the children born of her relationship with King Sancho I of Portugal had been born before that date.) daughter of Aires Nunes de Fornelos and Mor Pais (Mayor Peláez), and granddaughter of Soeiro Mendes da Maia, a member of the powerful Maia lineage. (Note: In her will executed before 1212, María Aires asked to be buried at the Monastery of Santo Tirso with her grandfather Soeiro Mendes da Maila. She also mentions her brother Soeiro and a nephew named Pedro Soares.) Before her marriage, she had two children out of wedlock with King Sancho I of Portugal; Martim and Urraca Sanches. From the marriage of Gil Vasques and Maria Aires, the following children were born:

- Martim Gil de Soverosa the Goodman (died c. 1259), married to Inés Fernández de Castro, the daughter of Fernán Gutiérrez de Castro and Milia Íñiguez de Mendoza. A daughter of this marriage, Teresa Martins de Soverosa was the wife of Rodrigo Eanes de Meneses, the parents of João Afonso Telo, the 1st Count of Barcelos and 4th Lord of Alburquerque.
- Teresa Gil de Soverosa, mistress of King Alfonso IX of León with whom she had four children.

His second marriage at around 1212 was with Sancha González de Orbaneja, They had three children:

- Vasco Gil de Soverosa, a troubadour who took part in the conquest of Andalusia where he was given land in the repartimiento of Seville. He married Fruilhe Fernandes de Riba de Vizela.
- Manrique Gil de Soverosa.
- Guiomar Gil de Soverosa (died before 1247).

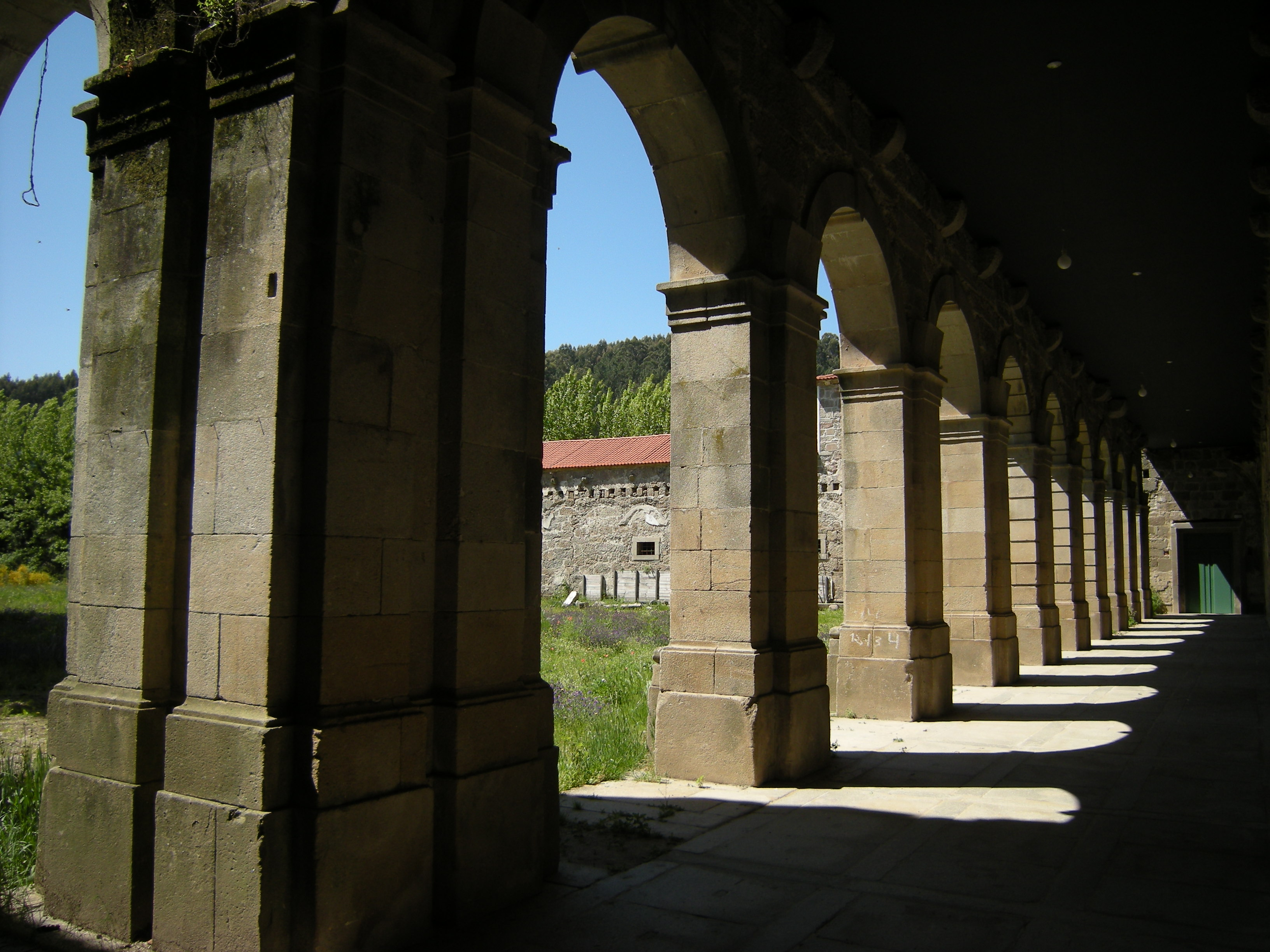
Monastery of Santa Maria de Pombeiro where Gil Vasques de Soverosa was buried

His third marriage was with María González Girón, the widow of Guillén Pérez de Guzmán and daughter of Gonzalo Rodríguez Girón and Sancha Rodríguez. (Note: On June 6, 1261, Pedro Núñez de Guzmán, Adelantado of Castile exchanged some properties with his sister Sancha Gil with the consent of her husband Alfonso López de Haro.) María had several children from her first marriage including Mayor Guillén de Guzmán, mistress of King Alfonso X of Castile, the parents of Queen Beatrice of Castile, wife of Afonso III of Portugal. Gil Vázquez de Soverosa and María were the parents of:

- Juan Gil de Soverosa (died after 1247), the husband of Constance de Riba de Vizela,without issue.
- Fernando Gil de Soverosa (died before 1247), he could have been the son of Gil's first marriage or this one.
- Gonzalo Gil de Soverosa (died after 1247), without issue.
- Sancha Gil de Soverosa (died before September 1262), married, before November 1257 as the second wife of Alfonso López de Haro, son of Count Lope Díaz II de Haro, Lord of Biscay. (Note: On November 12, 1257, King Alfonso X gave Sancha Gil, the second wife of Alfonso López de Haro, the villages of Velilla de Ocón and Dehesa de Árbol del Rey)
- Dórdia Gil de Soverosa, a nun at the Monastery of Arouca.

== Bibliography ==
- Carvalho Correia, Francisco (2008). O Mosteiro de Santo Tirso de 978 a 1588: a silhueta de uma entidade projectada no chao de uma história milenária (in Portuguese) (1st ed.). Santiago de Compostela: Universidade de Santiago de Compostela: Servizo de Publicacións e Intercambio Científico. ISBN 978-84-9887-038-1. Archived from the original on October 4, 2013.
- David, Henrique (1986). "Os portugueses nos livros de "repartimiento" da Andaluzía (Século XIII)" (PDF). Revista da Faculdade de Letras: História (in Portuguese) (3). Universidade do Porto: 51–75. ISSN 0871-164X.
- Pérez Carazo, Pedro (2008). Colección diplomática medieval de Santa María de Herce y su abadengo en la Edad Media. Logroño: Instituto de Estudios Riojanos. Universidad de La Rioja. ISBN 978-84964-873-38.
- Salazar y Acha, Jaime de (1989). "Los descendientes del conde Ero Fernández, fundador de Monasterio de Santa María de Ferreira de Pallares". El Museo de Pontevedra (in Spanish) (43): 67–86. ISSN 0210-7791.
- Sotto Mayor Pizarro, José Augusto (1997). Linhagens Medievais Portuguesas: Genealogias e Estratégias (1279-1325 (in Portuguese). Oporto: Doctorate thesis, author’s edition. hdl:10216/18023.
