= Beatrice of Castile (1242–1303) =

Queen of Portugal from 1253 to 1279

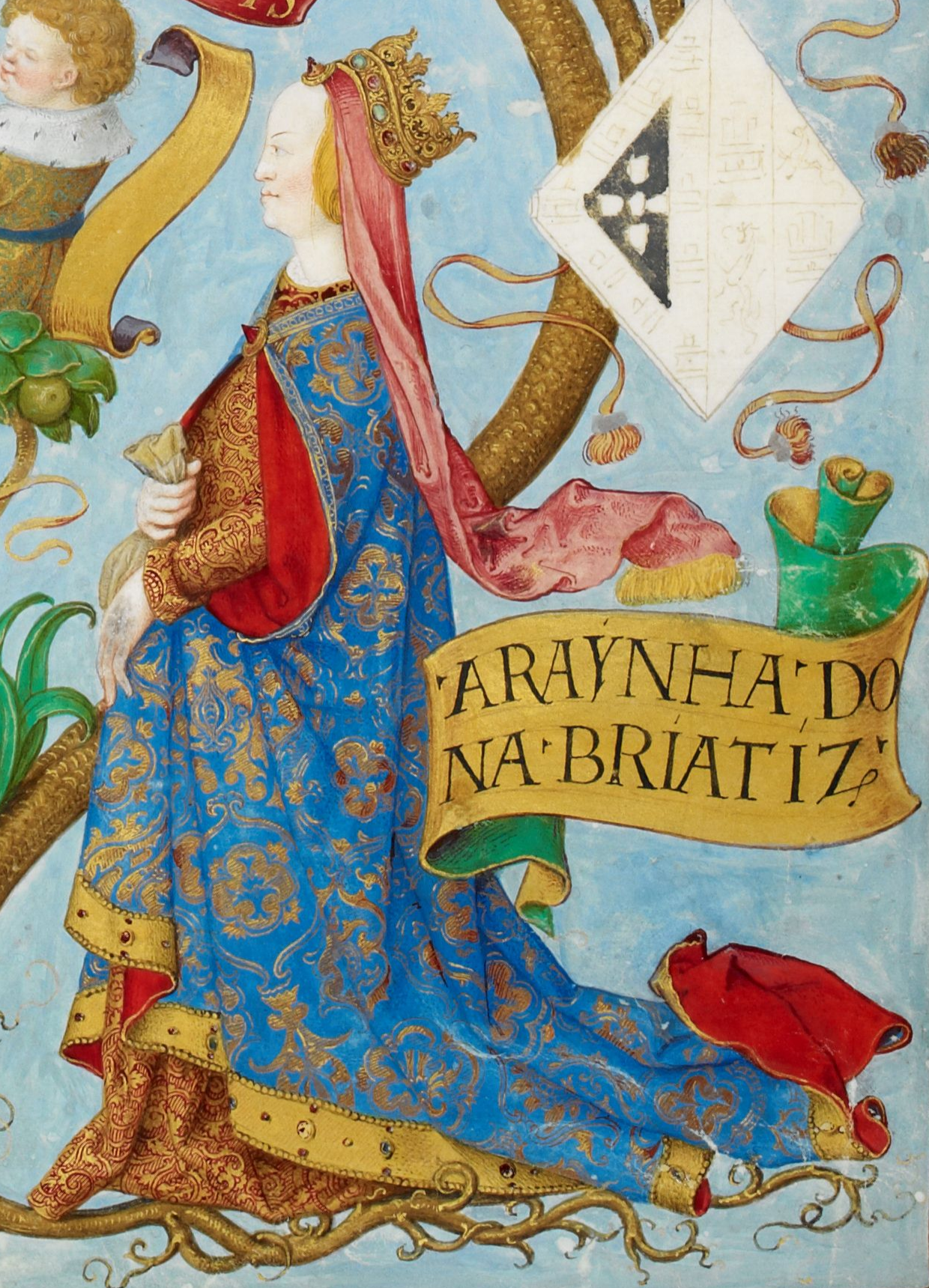
- Beatrice of Castile, in Antonio de Hollanda's Genealogy of the Royal Houses of Spain and Portugal (1530–1534)

Queen consort of Portugal
- Tenure: 1253 – 16 February 1279
- Born: 1242/44
- Died: 27 October 1303
- Burial: Monastery of Alcobaça
- Spouse: Afonso III of Portugal (m. 1253; died 1279)
- Issue among others...: Blanche, Lady of Las Huelgas; Denis, King of Portugal; Afonso, Lord of Portalegre; Infanta Sancha
- House: Castilian House of Ivrea
- Father: Alfonso X of Castile
- Mother: Mayor Guillén de Guzmán

Beatrice of Castile (1242/1244 – 27 October 1303), an illegitimate daughter of Alfonso X of Castile and his mistress Mayor Guillén de Guzmán, was the second Queen consort of Afonso III of Portugal.

== Biographical sketch ==
She was probably born shortly before 31 December 1244 when her father, King Alfonso, "with the consent of his father", donated Elche to his daughter Beatrice and all the children that he had with Mayor Guillén de Guzmán. As part of his strategy to reach an agreement with the Kingdom of Portugal on the sovereignty of the Algarve, King Alfonso X offered his daughter Beatrice in marriage to King Afonso III of Portugal. The wedding was celebrated in 1253. Under the agreement, the king of Castile promised that we would cede all the rights he held in the Algarve to the first male offspring of Alfonso III and Beatrice when the child was seven years old. The Portuguese nobility considered this marriage "humiliating for the King of Portugal". Much more serious was that when the nuptials took place, the Portuguese monarch was still married to Matilda II of Boulogne, who, in 1255, accused her husband before Pope Alexander IV of bigamy. In 1258, the Pope condemned him for adultery, demanded that he return Matilda's dowry, and placed him under interdict. Matilda, however, died that year and the Pope's threats were left in suspense.

Until her husband's death, Beatrice had great influence in the Portuguese court and supported the rapprochement of the kingdoms of Portugal and Castile.

When her mother died no later than 1267, she inherited her estates in La Alcarria which included Cifuentes, Viana de Mondejar, Palazuelos, Salmerón, Valdeolivas and Alcocer. In the last-mentioned city, she took under her protection the Monastery of Santa Clara that her mother, Mayor Guillén de Guzmán, had founded.

Queen Beatrice returned to Seville in 1282 due to discrepancies with her son, King Denis. Before November 1282, already a widow, she showed her monetary and personal support for her father in the dispute with her half-brother Sancho. A charter kept at the Torre do Tombo National Archive in Lisbon documents the donation made by King Alfonso X of Castile to his daughter Beatrice of the villas of Mourão, Serpa, Moura with their castles and, on the same day, he also gave her the Kingdom of Niebla and the royal tithes of the city of Badajoz. She remained at her father's side and was at his deathbed in 1284.

Beatrice died on 27 October 1303 and was buried at the Monastery of Alcobaça.

== Marriage and issue ==
The bride was about 11 years old and the groom was 42 years old. They had the following children:

Name	Birth	Death	Notes
Branca	25 February 1259	17 April 1321	Lady of Las Huelgas
Dinis	9 October 1261	7 January 1325	Succeeded him as 6th King of Portugal; married Infanta Elizabeth of Aragon
Afonso	8 February 1263	2 November 1312	Lord of Portalegre; married Infanta Violante Manuel (daughter of Manuel of Castile)
Sancha	2 February 1264	c. 1284	
Maria	1265	c. 1266	
Vicente	1268	1268	
Fernando	1269	1269	

== Ancestry ==
Ancestors of Beatrice of Castile

8. Alfonso IX of León
4. Ferdinand III of Castile
9. Berengaria of Castile
2. Alfonso X of Castile
10. Philip of Swabia
5. Elisabeth of Swabia
11. Irene Angelina
1. Beatrice of Castile
12. Pedro Rodríguez de Guzmán
6. Guillén Pérez de Guzmán
13. Mahalda
3. Mayor Guillén de Guzmán
14. Gonzalo Rodríguez Girón
7. María González Girón
15. Sancha Rodríguez

== Bibliography ==
- García Fernández, Manuel (1999). "La política internacional de Portugal y Castilla en el contexto peninsular del Tratado de Alcañices (1267-1297). Relaciones diplomáticas y dinásticas" (PDF). Work da Faculdade de Letras, Serie Historia (in Spanish) (XV). Universidade de Porto: 901–943. OCLC 632487275.
- González Jiménez, Manuel (2004). Alfonso X el Sabio. Barcelona: Publisher Ariel S. A. ISBN 84-344-6758-5.
- Livermore, H.V. (1947). A History of Portugal. Cambridge: Cambridge University Press. OCLC 1368719.
- Salazar y Acha, Jaime de (1989). "Los descendientes del conde Ero Fernández, fundador de Monasterio de Santa María de Ferreira de Pallares". El Museo de Pontevedra (in Spanish) (43): 67–86. ISSN 0210-7791.
- Salazar y Acha, Jaime de; Masnata y de Quesada, David (1990). "Precisiones y nuevos datos sobre el entorno familiar de Alfonso X el Sabio fundador de Ciudad Real" (PDF). Cuadernos de Estudios Manchegos (in Spanish) (20). Instituto de Estudios Manchegos: 210–231. ISSN 0526-2623.
- Valdeón Baruque, Julio (2003). Alfonso X: la forja de la España moderna (in Spanish). Madrid: Ediciones Temas de Hoy, S.A. ISBN 84-8460-277-X.
- Villalba Ruiz de Toledo, Francisco Javier (1989). "El Monasterio de Santa Clara de Alcocer y su conexión con la monarquía (siglos XIII-XV)" (PDF). Wad Al-Hayara: Trabajo de Estudios de Guadalajara (in Spanish) (16): 319–324. ISSN 0214-7092.

Beatrice of Castile (1242–1303) Castilian House of Ivrea Cadet branch of the House of Burgundy Born: 1242/44 Died: 27 October 1303
Portuguese royalty
Preceded by Matilda II of Boulogne	Queen consort of Portugal; 1253–1279	Succeeded by Elizabeth of Aragon
