= Iglesia de San Salvador =

Iglesia de San Salvador may refer to:

- Iglesia de San Salvador (Cifuentes)
- Iglesia de San Salvador (Fuentes)
- Iglesia de San Salvador (Guetaria)
- Iglesia de San Salvador (Nocedo)
- Iglesia de San Salvador (Priesca)
