= Sancha of Portugal (born 1264) =

Infanta Sancha
- Born: 2 February 1264; Kingdom of Portugal
- Died: 1279/c. 1284 (aged 15-20); Seville, Crown of Castile
- Burial: Monastery of Alcobaça, Alcobaça, Portugal
- House: Portuguese House of Burgundy
- Father: Afonso III
- Mother: Beatrice of Castile

Sancha of Portugal (Portuguese pronunciation: [ˈsɐ̃ʃɐ]) (2 February 1264 – 1279/c. 1284) was a Portuguese infanta, daughter of King Afonso III of Portugal and his second wife Beatrice of Castile.

Sancha was born on 2 February 1264. Little is known about her life. She travelled with her mother and sister Blanche to Seville where she died in 1279 or around 1284. In 1302, her remains were transferred to Portugal where she was buried at the Monastery of Alcobaça, Alcobaça.

== Ancestry ==
Ancestors of Sancha of Portugal (born 1264)

16. Afonso I of Portugal
8. Sancho I of Portugal
17. Maud of Savoy
4. Afonso II of Portugal
18. Ramon Berenguer IV, Count of Barcelona
9. Dulce of Aragon
19. Petronila of Aragon
2. Afonso III of Portugal
20. Sancho III of Castile
10. Alfonso VIII of Castile
21. Blanche of Navarre
5. Urraca of Castile
22. Henry II of England
11. Eleanor of England
23. Eleanor of Aquitaine
1. Sancha of Portugal
24. Alfonso IX of León
12. Ferdinand III of Castile
25. Berenguela of Castile
6. Alfonso X of Castile
26. Philip of Swabia
13. Elisabeth of Hohenstaufen
27. Irene Angelina of Constantinople
3. Beatrice of Castile
28. Pedro Rodríguez de Guzmán
14. Guillén Pérez de Guzmán
29. Mahalda
7. Mayor Guillén de Guzmán
30. Gonzalo Rodríguez Girón
15. María González Girón
31. Sancha Rodríguez
