= Blanche of Portugal (1259–1321) =

- Lady of Las Huelgas, Montemor-o-Velho, Alcocer and Briviesca
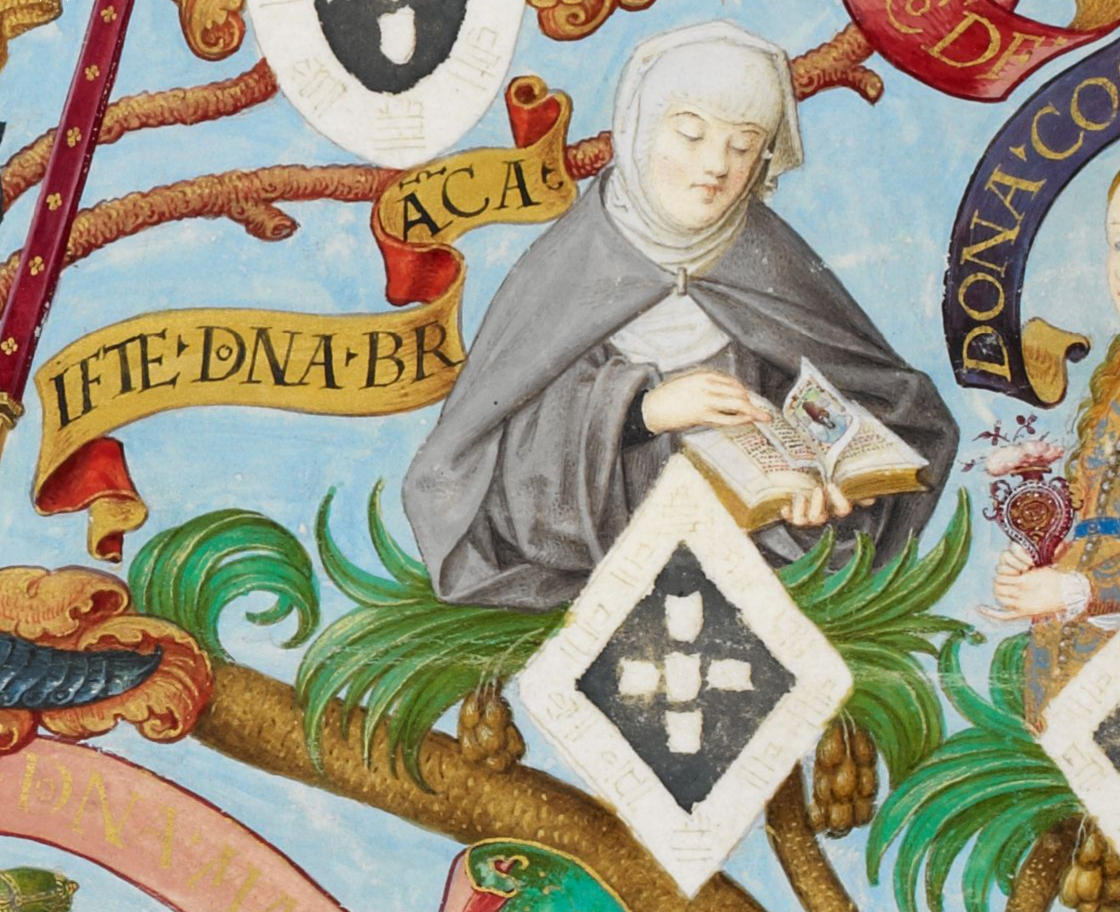
- Infanta Blanche of Portugal, in António de Holanda's Genealogy of the Royal Houses of Spain and Portugal (1534)
- Born: 25 February 1259; Santarém, Kingdom of Portugal
- Died: 17 April 1321 (aged 62); Burgos, Crown of Castile
- Burial: Abbey of Santa María la Real de Las Huelgas
- Issue: Juan Núñez de Prado
- House: Portuguese House of Burgundy
- Father: Afonso III
- Mother: Beatrice of Castile

Blanche of Portugal (25 February 1259 in Santarém, – 17 April 1321 in Burgos; Branca Portuguese pronunciation: [ˈbɾɐ̃kɐ] in Portuguese and Blanca in Spanish), was an infanta and nun, the firstborn child of King Afonso III of Portugal and his second wife Beatrice of Castile. Named after her great-aunt Blanche of Castile, queen of France, Blanche was the Lady of Las Huelgas, Montemor-o-Velho, Alcocer and Briviesca, the city which she founded.

== Biography ==
Born in Santarém, when Blanche was two years old, her father gave her, as a perpetual donation, the city of Montemor-o-Velho with the condition that it would revert to the crown upon her death or in the event that she married outside of Portugal. Following the footsteps of her great-aunt, queen Theresa of Portugal, Queen of León and other female members of the royal house and nobility, she went to live at the Monastery of Lorvão in 1277 although at that time she was not a nun and was never the abbess of this religious establishment.

In 1282, she accompanied her mother, Queen Beatrice, to Castile, due to differences with her brother King Denis of Portugal and coinciding with the conflict between her maternal grandfather, King Alfonso X and infante Sancho, the future King Sancho IV. There is documentary proof that mother and daughter were living in 1283 in Seville with the king who in his will mentioned his granddaughter Blanche and left her a substantial sum for her marriage.

In 1295, she became a nun at the Convent of Las Huelgas, as evidenced by a letter dated 15 April 1295 detailing the reasons that led her to become a nun at the recommendation and instructions of her uncle King Sancho IV of Castile, even though at first she had been reluctant to enter the religious order.

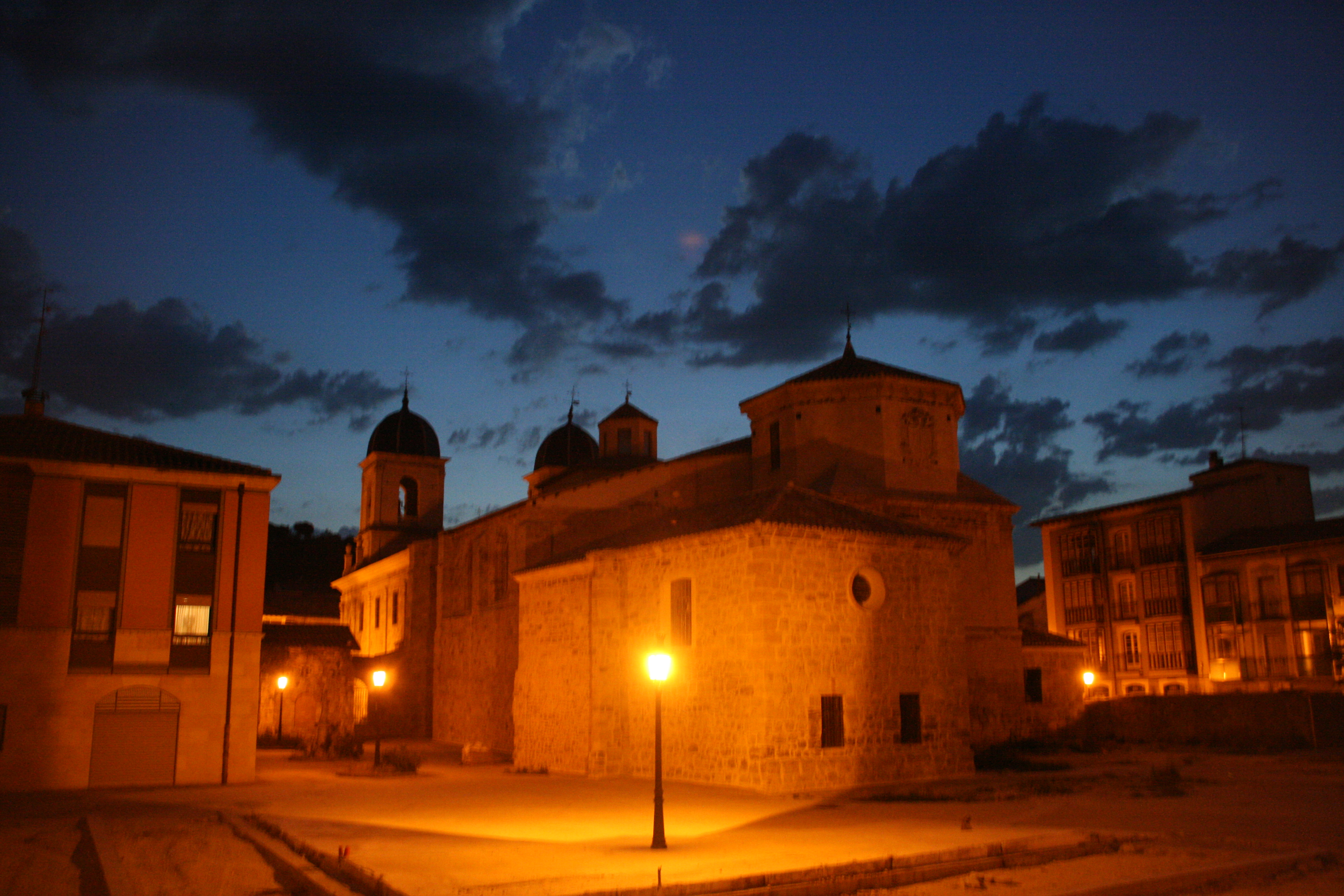
Colegiata de Santa Maria in Briviesca founded by infanta Blanche

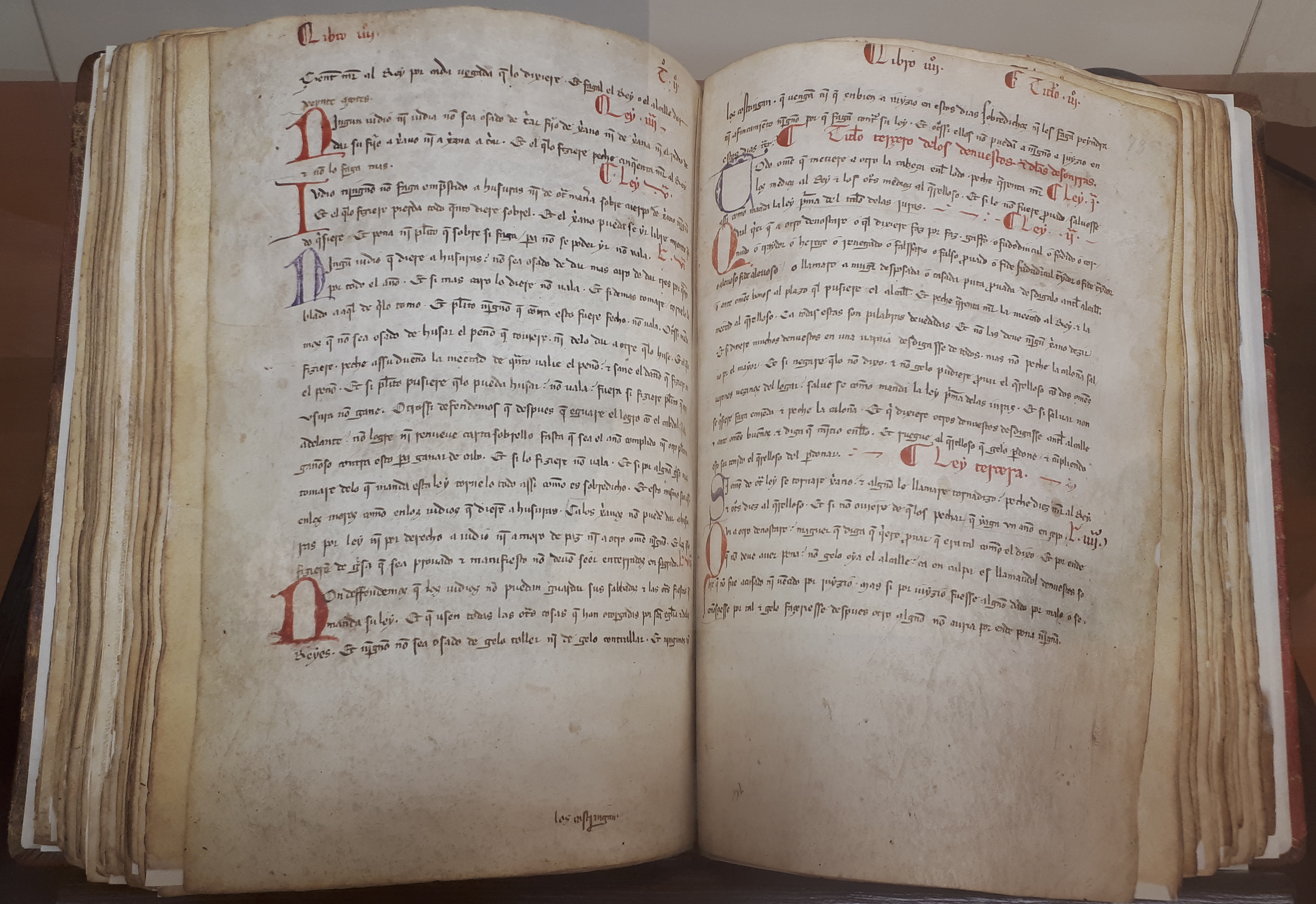
"Fuero de Briviesca" (1313).

She brought to the convent her dowry which consisted of several villages and properties and in 1303 donated to the convent the salt mines at Poza de la Sal and at Añana. Called the lady and keeper of the convent, Blanche was never its abbess, since during that time, between 1296 and 1326, Las Huelgas was governed by abbess Urraca Alfonso.

In 1303, upon her mother's death, Blanche inherited the señorío of Alcocer. On 27 September 1305, she purchased for 170,000 maravedíes from Juana Gómez de Manzanedo, the widow of infante Louis, son of Ferdinand III of Castile, her inheritance in the city of Briviesca. She is considered the founder of the city as its sponsor and coordinator, and was also responsible for the founding of Colegiata de Santa María. "Her work was not limited to the urban planning of the new city, the layout of its streets (...) she also granted it a legal instrument for its governance and administration, the Fuero of 1313, which was inspired by the text of the Royal Fuero".

=== Death ===
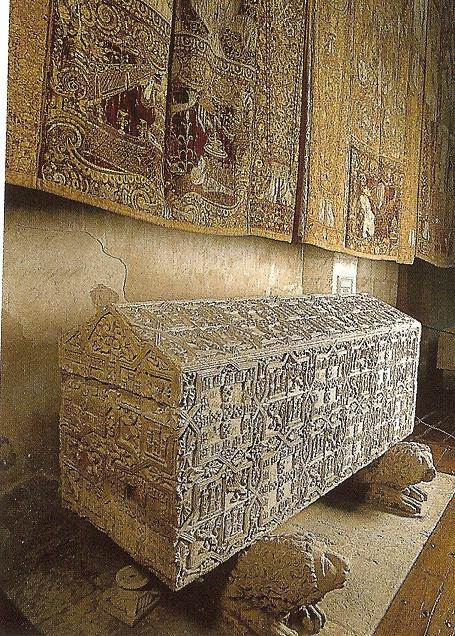
Blanche's tomb at Las Huelgas Convent.

She executed a will on 15 April 1321 where she ordered her burial at the Convent of Las Huelgas and also asked that ten thousand masses were to be celebrated for the good of her soul. In her will, she granted the city of Briviesca to King Alfonso XI of Castile with the condition that the city was never to be a señorío, that the king was to pay her debts totalling 300,000 maravedís, and entrusted him with the protection of the city and of the Colegiata de Santa María la Mayor which she had founded. Blanche named several executors of her will, including Queen María de Molina and Gonzalo de Hinojosa, the bishop of Burgos.

Infanta Blanche died at the Convent on 17 April 1321. Her sepulchre is decorated with intertwined stars and with the arms of the kingdoms of Castile, León, and of the Kingdom of Portugal.

== Issue ==
She had a son out of wedlock by a Portuguese nobleman named Pedro Nunes Carpinteiro, or Pedro Estevanez Carpenteyro as recorded in the chronicles of Rui de Pina and of Alfonso XI: (Note: Brandão in Quarta parte da Monarchia Lusitana mentions this son but says that he harbours great doubts since the Infanta's affair and son were not mentioned by Pedro Afonso, Count of Barcelos who does not speak ill of her and simply mentions that she did not want to marry.)

- Juan Núñez de Prado, Master of the Order of Calatrava and vassal of King Alfonso XI of Castile and his son King Pedro of Castile, who had him killed in 1355 at the castle in Maqueda.

== Ancestry ==
Ancestors of Blanche of Portugal (1259–1321)

16. Afonso I of Portugal
8. Sancho I of Portugal
17. Maud of Savoy
4. Afonso II of Portugal
18. Ramon Berenguer IV, Count of Barcelona
9. Dulce of Aragon
19. Petronila of Aragon
2. Afonso III of Portugal
20. Sancho III of Castile
10. Alfonso VIII of Castile
21. Blanche of Navarre
5. Urraca of Castile
22. Henry II of England
11. Eleanor of England
23. Eleanor of Aquitaine
1. Blanche of Portugal
24. Alfonso IX of León
12. Ferdinand III of Castile
25. Berenguela of Castile
6. Alfonso X of Castile
26. Philip of Swabia
13. Elisabeth of Hohenstaufen
27. Irene Angelina of Constantinople
3. Beatrice of Castile
28. Pedro Rodríguez de Guzmán
14. Guillén Pérez de Guzmán, Lord of Vecilla
29. Mahalda
7. Mayor Guillén de Guzmán
30. Gonzalo Rodríguez Girón
15. María González Girón
31. Sancha Rodríguez

== Bibliography ==
- Arco y Garay, Ricardo del (1954). Sepulcros de la Casa Real de Castilla (in Spanish). Madrid: Instituto Jerónimo Zurita. Consejo Superior de Investigaciones Científicas. OCLC 11366237.
- Brandão, Antonio (1632). Quarta parte da Monarchia Lusitana (in Portuguese). Lisbon: Craesbeeck Impresor. "pedro nunes."
- Cerda y Rico, Francisco (1787). Crónica de D. Alfonso el Onceno (in Spanish). originally written during the reign of King Alfonso XI and transferred by his son, King Henry II of Castile (2nd ed.). Madrid: Imprenta de Antonio Sancha.
- Castro Garrido, Araceli (1987). Documentación del Monasterio de Las Huelgas de Burgos (1307-1321) (in Spanish). Burgos: Ediciones J.M. Garrido Garrido. ISBN 84-86371-15-5.
- Concejo Díez, María Luisa (1999). El arte mudejar en Burgos y su provincia, Tesis doctoral (PDF) (in Spanish). Madrid: Departamento de Historia del Arte (Medieval), Facultad de Geografía e Historia, Universidad Complutense de Madrid.
- García Fernández, Manuel (1999). "La política internacional de Portugal y Castilla en el contexto peninsular del Tratado de Alcañices (1267-1297). Relaciones diplomáticas y dinásticas" (PDF). Revista da Faculdade de Letras, Serie Historia (in Spanish) (XV). Universidade de Porto: 901–943. OCLC 632487275.
- Ibarra Álvarez, José Luis; Ortega Martínez, Ana Isabel (1998). "La villa de Briviesca en la Baja Edad Media: datos y reflexiones para su estudio" (PDF). Boletín de la Institución Fernán González (in Spanish) (217): 321–352. ISSN 0211-8998. Archived from the original (PDF) on 2013-10-23.
- Rades y Andrada, Francisco (1572). Chronica de las Órdenes y Cavallerias de Santiago, Calatrava y Alcántara. Toledo: Casa de Juan de Ayala. OCLC 55249328.
- Rodrigues Oliveira, Ana (2010). Rainhas medievais de Portugal. Dezassete mulheres, duas dinastias, quatro séculos de História (in Portuguese). Lisbon: A esfera dos livros. ISBN 978-989-626-261-7.
- Salazar y Acha, Jaime de (1989). "Los descendientes del conde Ero Fernández, fundador de Monasterio de Santa María de Ferreira de Pallares". El Museo de Pontevedra (43): 67–86. ISSN 0210-7791.
- Salazar y Acha, Jaime de; Masnata y de Quesada, David (1990). "Precisiones y nuevos datos sobre el entorno familiar de Alfonso X el Sabio fundador de Ciudad Real" (PDF). Cuadernos de Estudios Manchegos (20). Instituto de Estudios Manchegos: 210–231. ISSN 0526-2623. Archived from the original (PDF) on 2013-11-13.
