= Raid on Seville =

Raid on Seville may refer to:

- Viking raid on Seville (844)
- Portuguese raid on Seville (1225)
