= Castle of Palazuelos =

- Castillo de Palazuelos (Spanish)
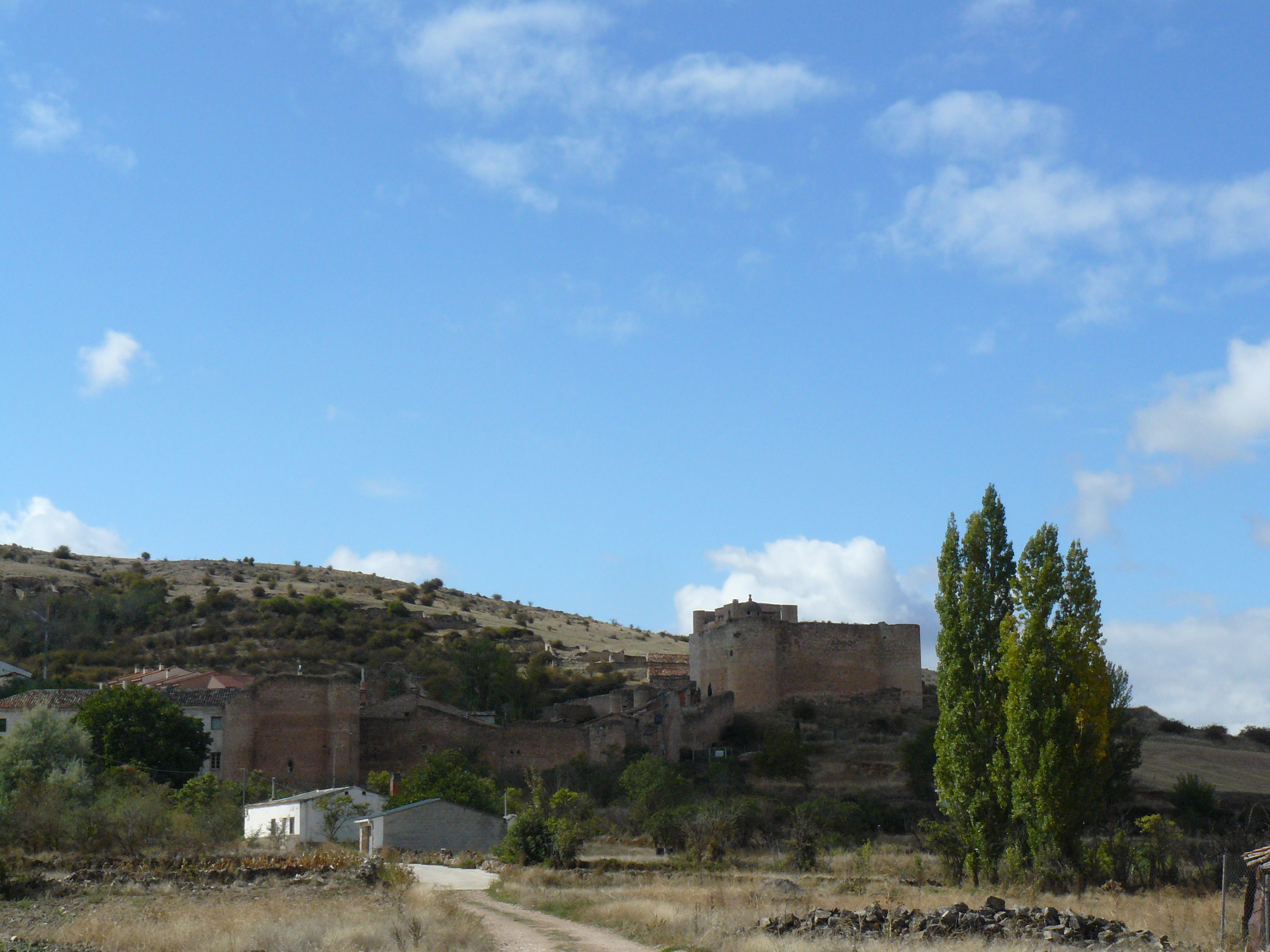

- Location within Spain
- 41.091717°N 2.692107°W
- Location: Sigüenza, Spain

Spanish Cultural Heritage
- Official name: Castillo de Palazuelos
- Type: Non-movable
- Criteria: Monument
- Designated: 1951
- Reference no.: RI-51-0001238

The Castle of Palazuelos (Spanish: Castillo de Palazuelos) is a castle located in Palazuelos Sigüenza, Spain. It was declared Bien de Interés Cultural in 1951.
