= Mayor Guillén de Guzmán =

Castilian aristocrat (1205–1262)

- Lady of Alcocer
- Born: 1205
- Died: 1262 (aged 56–57); Alcocer
- Buried: Monastery of Santa Clara in Alcocer
- Father: Guillén Pérez de Guzmán
- Mother: María González Girón

Mayor Guillén de Guzmán (1205–1262) was a member of one of the most aristocratic families in the court of King Ferdinand III of Castile. Her parents were Guillén Pérez de Guzmán and María González Girón, daughter of Gonzalo Rodríguez Girón and his first wife Sancha Rodríguez, and sister of Pedro Rodríguez de Guzmán, Castile's first adelantado and father of Alonso Pérez de Guzmán.

== Biographical sketch ==
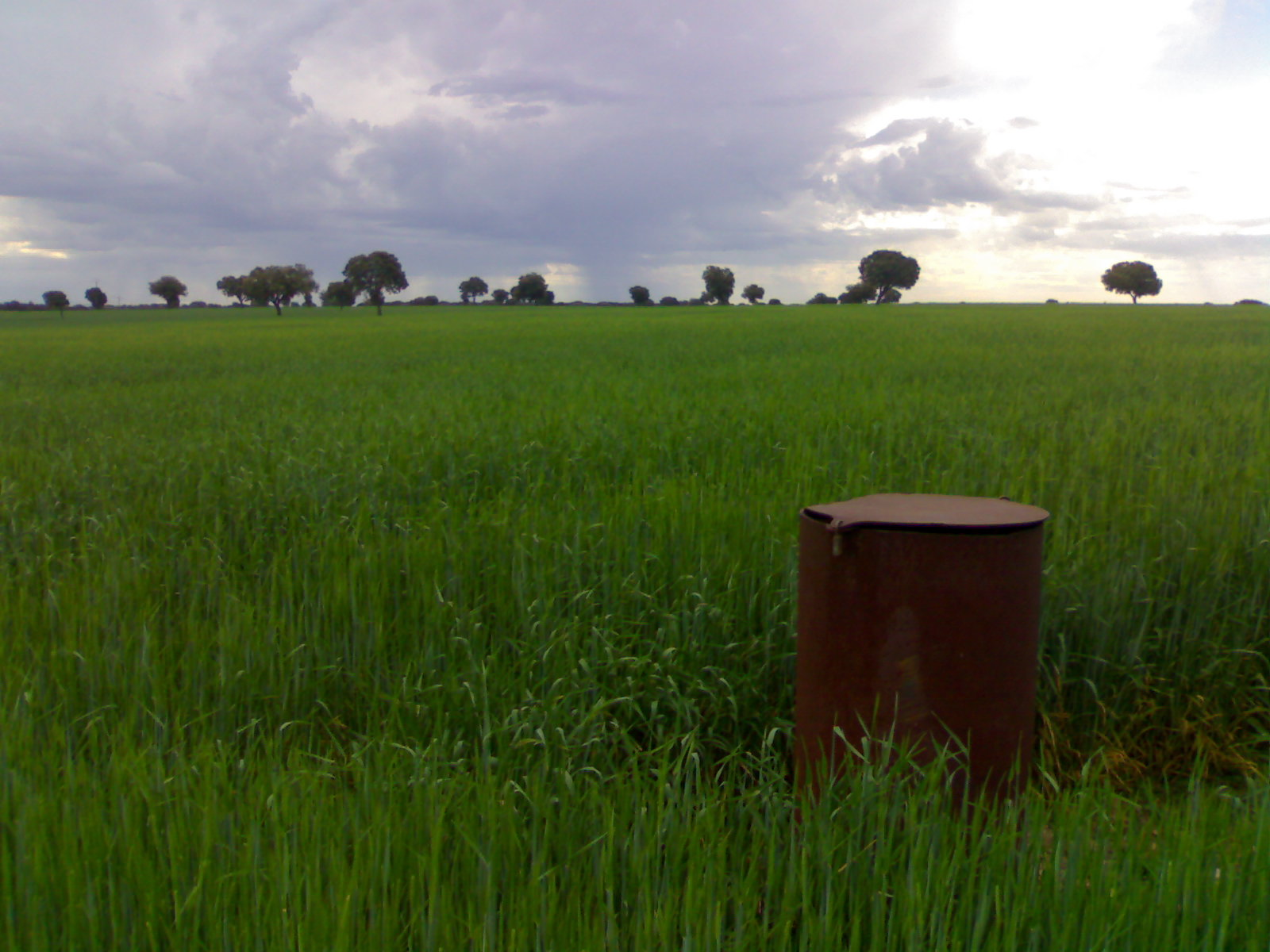
Landscape in La Alcarria where Mayor received several properties from King Alfonso X of Castile

Her name is registered in contemporary chronicles and documents as the lover of prince Alfonso de Castilla, future king Alfonso X of Castile, son of Ferdinand III of Castile and Elisabeth of Swabia. In 1255, Alfonso gave her lands in La Alcarria which included Cifuentes, Viana de Mondéjar, Palazuelos, Salmerón, Vadesliras and Alcocer. With the collaboration of King Alfonso, she founded the Monastery of Santa Clara de Alcocer in an unpopulated village called San Miguel del Monte within the jurisdiction of Alcocer. The foundational charter dated September 22, 1260 was confirmed by her brothers Pedro and Nuño Rodríguez de Guzmán.

== Issue ==
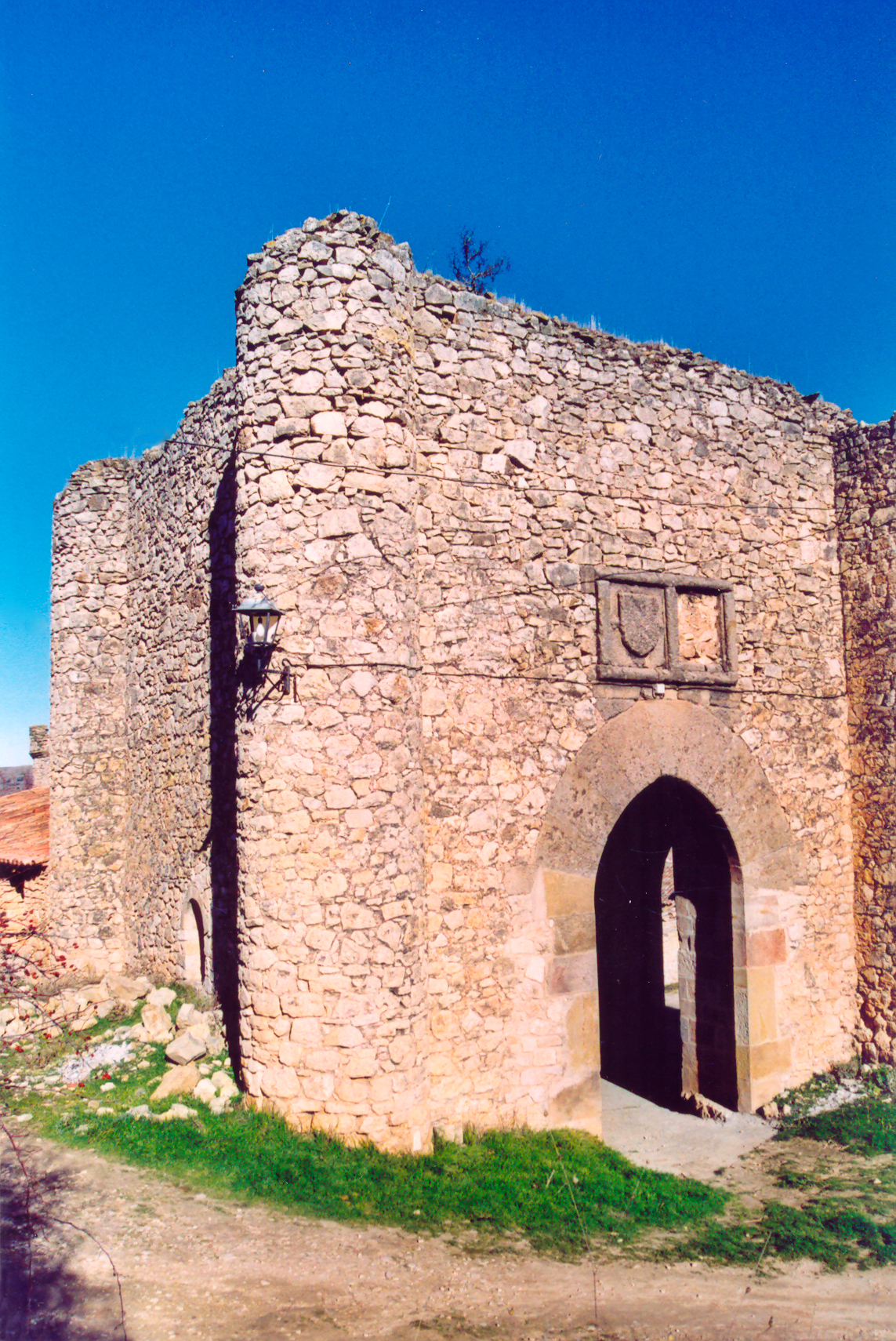
Del Monte gate at the walls of the medieval city of Palazuelos

From her relationship with Infante Alfonso she had one daughter:

- Beatrice (1242–1303), the sole beneficiary of her mother's estates, married Afonso III of Portugal and was the mother of Denis I of Portugal. On December 31, 1244, Alfonso with the consent of his father, donated the village of Elche to his daughter Beatrice, most probably born around that date, which would seem to indicate that the relationship was stable and accepted.

== Death and burial ==
She died in early 1262 in Alcocer and was buried in the monastery of the Poor Clares that she had founded at San Miguel del Monte. Years later, on July 24, 1276, King Alfonso executed an agreement with Juan González who made a walnut-wood sepulchre with a bas-relief image of Mayor. The parchment document was auctioned at Christie's in 2009. The convent, as well as her sepulcher were moved to Alcocer years later. Her body, which remained intact until the beginning of the 20th-century, disappeared in 1936 along with a polychromed sculpture considered among the best funerary art from the Middle Ages in Guadalajara.

== Bibliography ==
- García Fernández, Manuel (1999). "La política internacional de Portugal y Castilla en el contexto peninsular del Tratado de Alcañices (1267-1297). Relaciones diplomáticas y dinásticas" (PDF). Revista da Faculdade de Letras, Serie Historia (in Spanish) (XV). Universidade do Porto: 901–943. OCLC 632487275.
- González Jiménez, Manuel (2004). Alfonso X el Sabio (in Spanish). Barcelona: Publisher Ariel S. A. ISBN 84-344-6758-5.
- Gutiérrez Baños, Fernando (2015). "Una nota sobre escultura castellana del siglo XIII". Archivo Español de Arte. 88: 37–52. doi:10.3989/aearte.2015.03.
- Martín Prieto, Pablo (2005). "La fundación del monasterio de Santa Clara de Alcocer (1252-1260)". Hispania Sacra (in Spanish). 57 (115). Madrid: 227–241. doi:10.3989/hs.2005.v57.i115.122. OCLC 844065330. Archived from the original on 2013-11-13.
- Salazar y Acha, Jaime de (1989). "Los descendientes del conde Ero Fernández, fundador de Monasterio de Santa María de Ferreira de Pallares". El Museo de Pontevedra (in Spanish) (43): 67–86. ISSN 0210-7791.
- Salazar y Acha, Jaime de; Masnata y de Quesada, David (1990). "Precisiones y nuevos datos sobre el entorno familiar de Alfonso X el Sabio fundador de Ciudad Real" (PDF). Cuadernos de Estudios Manchegos (in Spanish) (20). Instituto de Estudios Manchegos: 210–231. ISSN 0526-2623.
- Valdeón Baruque, Julio (2003). Alfonso X: la forja de la España moderna (in Spanish). Madrid: Ediciones Temas de Hoy, S.A. ISBN 84-8460-277-X.
- Villalba Ruiz de Toledo, Francisco Javier (1989). "El Monasterio de Santa Clara de Alcocer y su conexión con la monarquía (siglos XIII-XV)" (PDF). Wad Al-Hayara: Trabajo de Estudios de Guadalajara (in Spanish) (16): 319–324. ISSN 0214-7092.
