= Portuguese raid on Seville =

13th-century Christian raid on Seville during the Reconquista

Raid on Seville
- Part of the Reconquista
Date	Early summer 1225
Location	Seville, Almohad Caliphate
Result	Christian victory

Belligerents
Kingdom of Portugal; Or Kingdom of Leon (disputed)	Almohad Caliphate

Commanders and leaders
Unknown	Abd Allah ibn Abi Bakr

Casualties and losses
Unknown	Heavy but likely exaggerated; According to one report, 20,000 people were massacred

The Portuguese raid on Seville took place in the summer of 1225, when a Christian raiding party was confronted by the citizens of Seville who left the confines of the city to battle with the raiders as the Almohad authorities chose not to fight. The citizen force composed of merchants and tradesmen clashed with the Christians near the settlement of Tejada and was defeated.

== Background ==
Christian incursions into Almohad territory, had started to worry the Andalusi population, who now saw the Almohads as incompetent and unable to defend their territory. This particular quote by Al-Shaqundi, although talking specifically about this Portuguese raid, clearly demonstrates fear and vunerability of the Muslims to the Christians:

"The Portuguese had come to raid this region and had pillaged and taken what they found. Al-Adil, the ruler of the Maghreb, was in Seville at the time with his wazir, Abü Zayd b. Yujjän, and the high officials and Almohad shaykhs. They had neither the money nor the means to resist the enemy: the power of the empire was then in decline and the luster of the dynasty tarnished. If a disaster afflicted one of its subjects, if his flocks were raided, he could not hope for any help or get any assistance."

== Battle ==
Historians have not reached a consensus on which Christian kingdom led the expedition and its commander. An early 20th century book written by Lucas of Tuy attributes the raid to the Kingdom of León, claiming that Alfonso IX of León sent Martim Sanches to raid Seville, with a force composed of mostly Leonese soldiers, although he also claims that perhaps a Portuguese contingent was present. Sanches was an illegitimate son of Sancho I of Portugal and had been in Alfonso IX's service governing territories in Galicia. Other scholars such as Kennedy and Catlos believe differently, attributing the raid to the Kingdom of Portugal. The Almohadi author Al-Shaqundi also affirms that the raiding party was Portuguese.

After the news of the approaching raiders reached Seville, the people of the city demanded that the Almohad authorities dispatch a military force to ride out and intercept the Christians. When the sortie was organized two days later, the mounted horsemen were joined by a large number of citizens. The citizen force was composed of a wide variety of individuals including artisans, merchants, tradesmen, and laborers most unarmed. Together with the Almohad horsemen, the Muslim force including the civilian rabble struck out in the direction of Campo de Tejada, approximately 35 kilometers west of Seville to confront the enemy.

At Tejada, prior to the onset of a battle, Abd Allah ibn Abi Bakr, the commander of the Almohad military detachment from Seville, warned the citizen crowd that the Christian force was quite large, well armed, and dressed in armor ready for a fight. The citizen crowd angerly expressed their intent to confront the Christian force regardless of Abi Bakr's warning. After being scorned and insulted when he forbade their participation a battle, Abi Bakr and the Almohad detachment left the field and departed, returning to Seville.

Observing the departure of the Almohad detachment, the Christian raiders began their approach on the citizen crowd. As the raiders mounted their attack, the citizen crown panicked and began to flee. In the melee that ensued, the well armed raiders easily defeated the largely unarmed citizen force. Many of the citizens were slain while many others were taken prisoner. Although exaggerated estimates were made of the number of the civilian casualties, the actual number of those killed or taken prisoner is uncertain.

After defeating the citizens of Seville at Tejada, the Christian raiders appear to have conducted additional operations in the territory surrounding Seville. The force eventually returned north with the war gains taken during their journey and a number of captives. The ultimate fate of the Tejada captives is unknown.

== Aftermath ==
As a result of the raid on Seville in 1225 and the crushing defeat of the citizen force, public contempt for Almohad authority grew. There was a loss of confidence in the Almohad military establishment and the perception that the countryside could no longer be defended. An increase in the willingness to support local leaders by the populace led to a wave of revolts in al-Andalus. Almohad governors were deposed ultimately ushering in the third taifa period.

Because of this campaign, King Sancho II of Portugal saw an opportunity to conquer additional territory for his kingdom. In 1226, he coordinated a military campaign with the King of León against the Almohad Caliphate. Whilst the Leonose attacked Badajoz, the Portuguese would also launch their attack, but on the city of Elvas.

== See also ==
- Moroccan-Portuguese conflicts
- Reconquista
- Triana raid of 1178

== Citations ==
- Catlos, Brian A. (2018-05-01). Kingdoms of Faith: A New History of Islamic Spain. Basic Books. ISBN 978-0-465-09316-8.
- Elinson, Alexander (2009-02-15). Looking Back at al-Andalus: The Poetics of Loss and Nostalgia in Medieval Arabic and Hebrew Literature. BRILL. ISBN 978-90-474-4272-1.
- García Sanjuán, Alejandro (2002). "Evolución histórica y poblamiento de Talyāta durante la época musulmana" (PDF). Archivo Hispalense (in Spanish). 85 (259–260). Seville: Diputación Provincial de Sevilla.
- al-Himyari, Muhammad ibn Abd al-Mun'im (1938). Lévi-Provençal, Évariste (ed.). La péninsule ibérique au Moyen Âge d'après le Kitāb ar-Rawḍ al-Miʿṭār fī Khabar al-Aqṭār d'Ibn ʿAbd al-Munʿim al-Ḥimyarī (in Arabic and French). Leiden: E. J. Brill. pp. 128–129 (Arabic text), 156–157 (French translation).
- Kennedy, Hugh (1996). Muslim Spain and Portugal: A Political History of al-Andalus (PDF). London: Addison-Wesley-Longman.
- Lay, S. (2008-11-28). The Reconquest Kings of Portugal: Political and Cultural Reorientation on the Medieval Frontier. Springer. ISBN 978-0-230-58313-9.
- Lucas of Tuy (1926). Puyol, Julio (ed.). Crónica de España. Madrid: Real Academia de la Historia.
- Medina, Inês Calderón; Ferreira, João Paulo Martins (2014). "Beyond the Border: The Aristocratic Mobility between the Kingdoms of Portugal and León (1157–1230)" (PDF). e-Journal of Portuguese History. 12 (1).
- Shaw, Jeffrey M.; Demy, Timothy J. (2017-03-27). War and Religion: An Encyclopedia of Faith and Conflict [3 volumes]. Bloomsbury Publishing USA. ISBN 979-8-216-16317-6.
