= Martim Sanches =

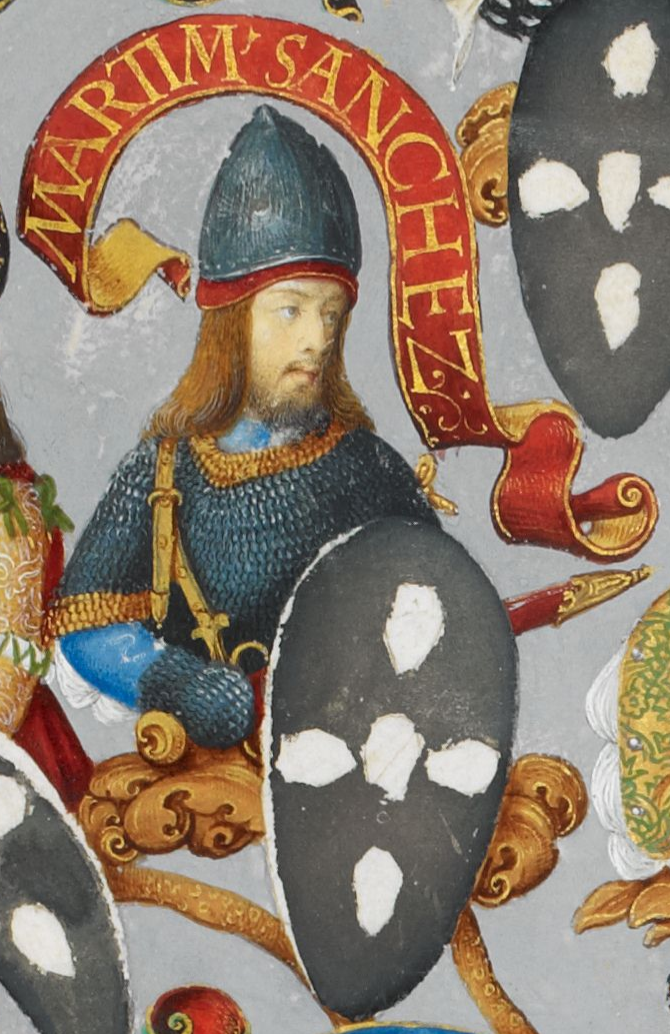
Martim Sanches in a miniature from the 16th-century Portuguese Genealogy

Martim Sanches (fl. 1175–1226), known in Spanish as Martín Sánchez de Portugal, was a Portuguese nobleman who, during the reign of Alfonso II, was exiled to the Kingdom of León.

== Family ==
Martim was an illegitimate son of Sancho I of Portugal and Maria Aires de Fornelos, who was a daughter of Aires Nunes de Fornelos and Mor Pires, who later married Gil Vasques de Soverosa. He had a full sister named Urraca. In 1175, together with her children by Sancho and her husband Gil, Mor was present at Santo Tirso Monastery to make a gift to her relatives, Marina Pais, and Marina's husband, Vasco Pires.

Martim married Elo Pérez de Castro, daughter of Pedro Fernández de Castro and Jimena Gómez de Manzanedo. They had no children together before their divorce. In 1205, Elo married Viscount Guerau IV de Cabrera.

In April 1207, Sancho I granted the villages and churches of Vila Nova das Infantas and of Golães to Martim and his sister. In January 1226, Martim sold half of his share to Santo Tirso. Urraca confirmed the charter of sale.

== Career ==
King Alfonso IX of León entrusted the exiled Martim with the government of Galicia. During his tenure, he had to contend with an invasion of Galicia by his half-brother, Alfonso II of Portugal. Martim gathered an army and invaded Entre-Douro-e-Minho using scorched earth tactics, probably incited by the archbishop of Braga, Estêvão Soares da Silva.

== Bibliography ==
- Carvalho Correia, Francisco (2008). O Mosteiro de Santo Tirso, de 978 a 1588: A silhueta de uma entidade projectada no chao de uma história milenária (Tese de doutoramento). Santiago de Compostela: Facultade de Xeografía e História. Universidade de Santiago de Compostela. Archived from the original on 2016-03-03.
- David, Henrique; Sotto Mayor Pizarro, José Augusto P. (1990). "Nobres Portugueses em Leão e Castela (Século XIII)". Actas de las II Jornadas de Historia sobre Andalucía y el Algarve (Siglos XIII–XVIII), La Rábida, 24–26 abril, 1986 (PDF) (in Portuguese). Sevilla: Departamento de Historia Medieval, Universidad de Sevilla. pp. 135–150.
- Fernández-Xesta y Vázquez, Ernesto (2001). Relaciones del condado de Urgel con Castilla y León. Madrid: E&P Libros Antiguos, S.L.
- Mattoso, José (1991). "A nobreza medieval Portuguesa no contexto peninsular" (PDF). Revista da Faculdade de Letras: História (in Portuguese) (III). Porto: Universidade do Porto: 1019–1044. ISSN 0871-164X.
