= Cifuentes, Guadalajara =

Cifuentes
- Municipality
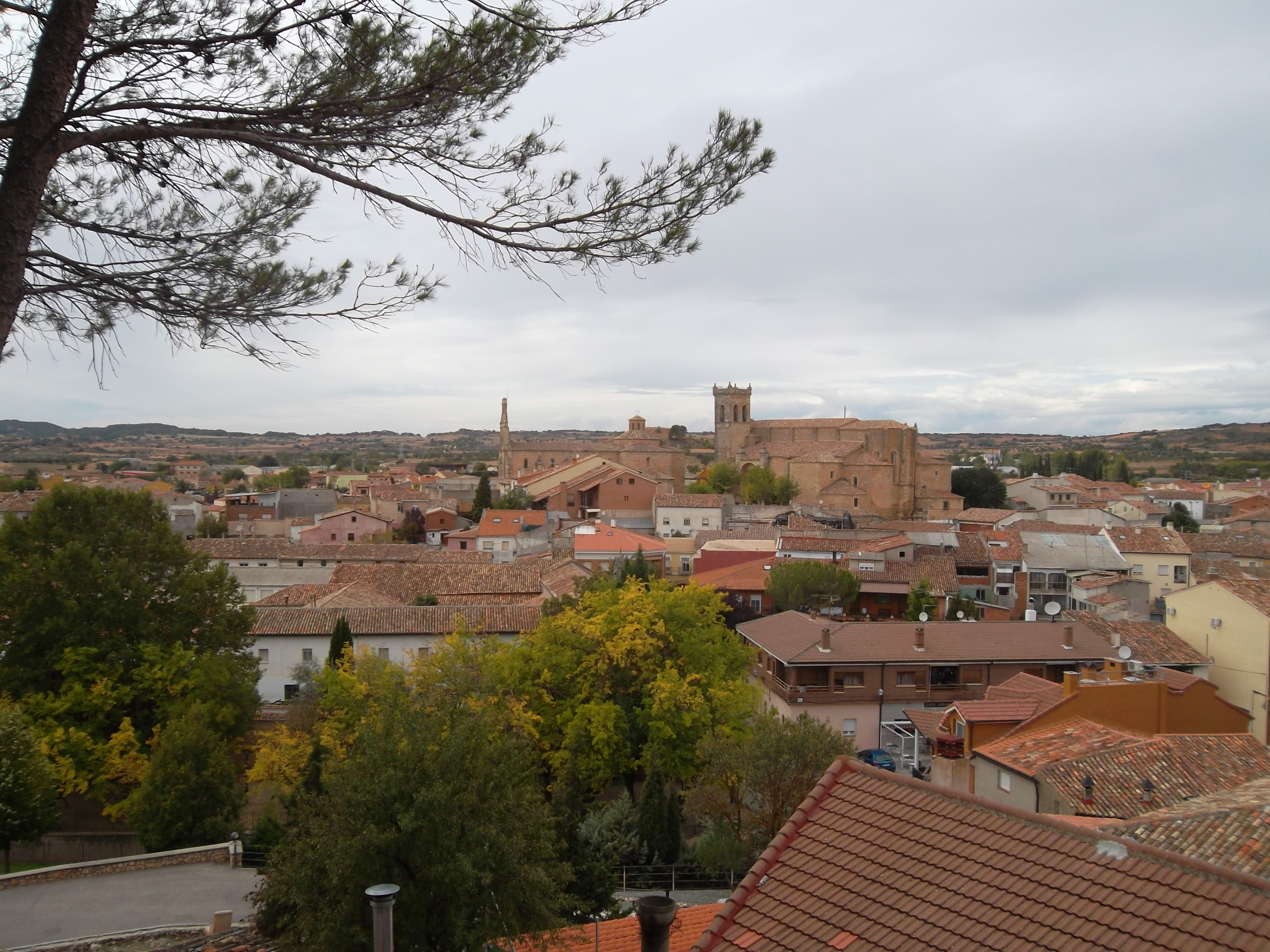

- Flag Coat of arms
- Interactive map of Cifuentes
- Location within Castilla-La Mancha Location within Spain
- Coordinates: 40°47′11″N 2°37′17″W
- Country: Spain
- Autonomous community: Castilla–La Mancha
- Province: Guadalajara

Area
  - Total: 220.23 km^{2} (85.03 sq mi)
- Elevation: 894 m (2,933 ft)

Population (2025-01-01)
  - Total: 1,731
  - Density: 7.860/km^{2} (20.36/sq mi)
- Time zone: UTC+1 (CET)
  - Summer (DST): UTC+2 (CEST)

Cifuentes (Spanish pronunciation: [θiˈfwen.tes]) is a municipality of Spain belonging to the province of Guadalajara, in the autonomous community of Castilla–La Mancha. As of 1 January 2025, the municipality has a registered population of 1,731. The historic Church of San Salvador stands in the town.

Extending across a total area of 220.23 km^{2}, the municipality includes ten minor rural settlements (pedanías) in addition to the town of Cifuentes.

== History ==
The hamlet of Cifuentes celebrated fairs since the 13th century, complaints from Atienza notwithstanding. The market generated economic prosperity, and received privileges from the Crown in 1242. Segregated from the Common of Atienza to which it hitherto belonged to, Cifuentes was donated to Mayor Guillén de Guzmán circa 1255. Since 1431, the history of the place was linked to the House of Silva.
