= Church of San Salvador (Cifuentes) =

- Iglesia de San Salvador (Spanish)
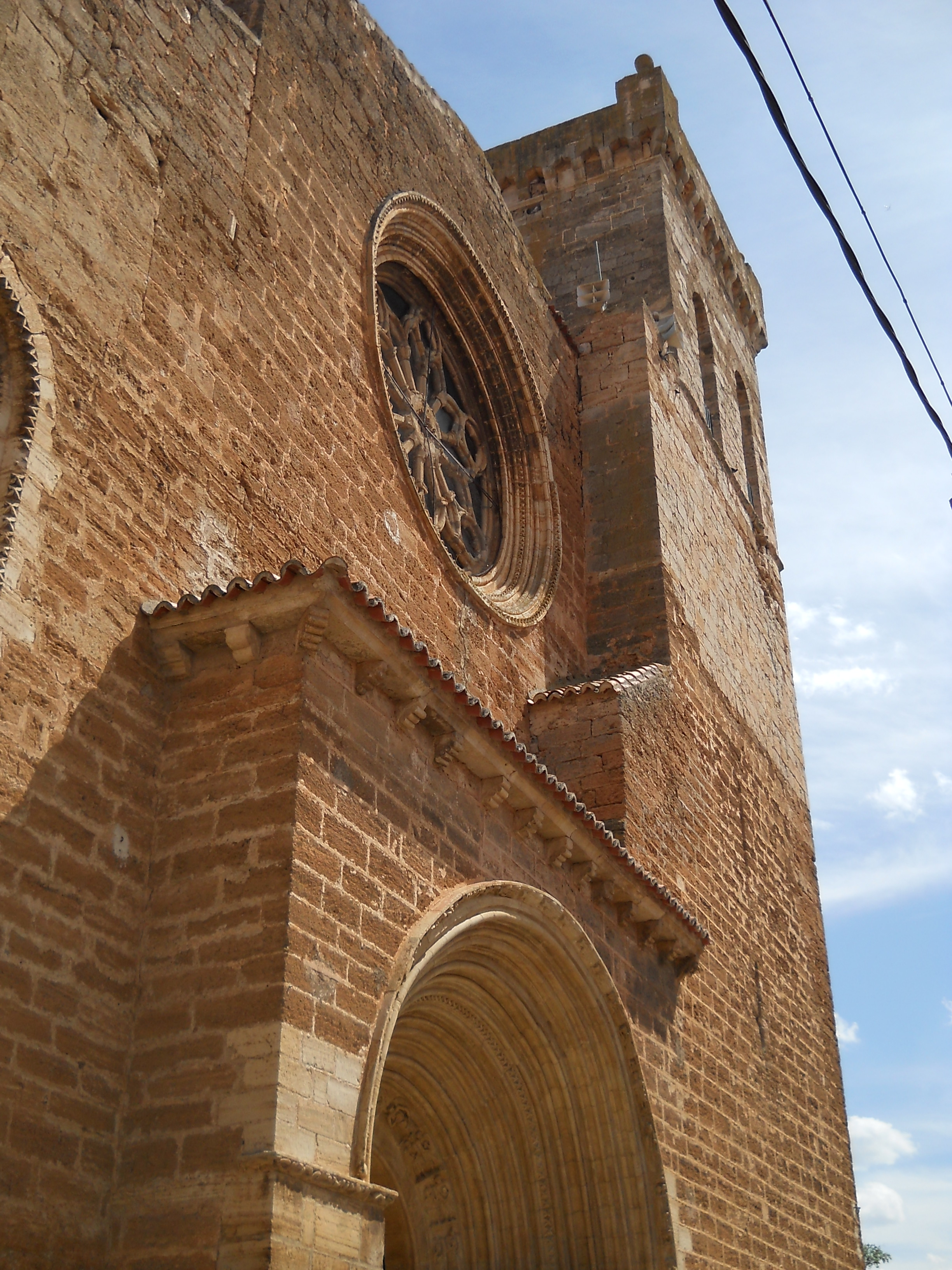

- Location within Spain
- 40.785811°N 2.622879°W
- Location: Cifuentes, Spain

Spanish Cultural Heritage
- Official name: Iglesia de San Salvador
- Type: Non-movable
- Criteria: Monument
- Designated: 1991
- Reference no.: RI-51-0007129

The Church of San Salvador (Spanish: Iglesia de San Salvador) is a church located in Cifuentes, Spain. It was declared Bien de Interés Cultural in 1991.

Between 1261 and 1268, the church was erected in a late-Romanesque, early-Gothic style.
