= Iglesia de San Salvador (Nocedo) =

- Iglesia de San Salvador (Nocedo)
- 43°26′40″N 5°06′08″W
- Location: Asturias, Spain

Iglesia de San Salvador is a church in Nocedo (Asturian: Nocéu), Asturias, Spain. The church was established in the 1170s.

== See also ==
- Asturian art
- Catholic Church in Spain
- Churches in Asturias
- List of oldest church buildings
