= Valdeolivas =

Valdeolivas, Spain
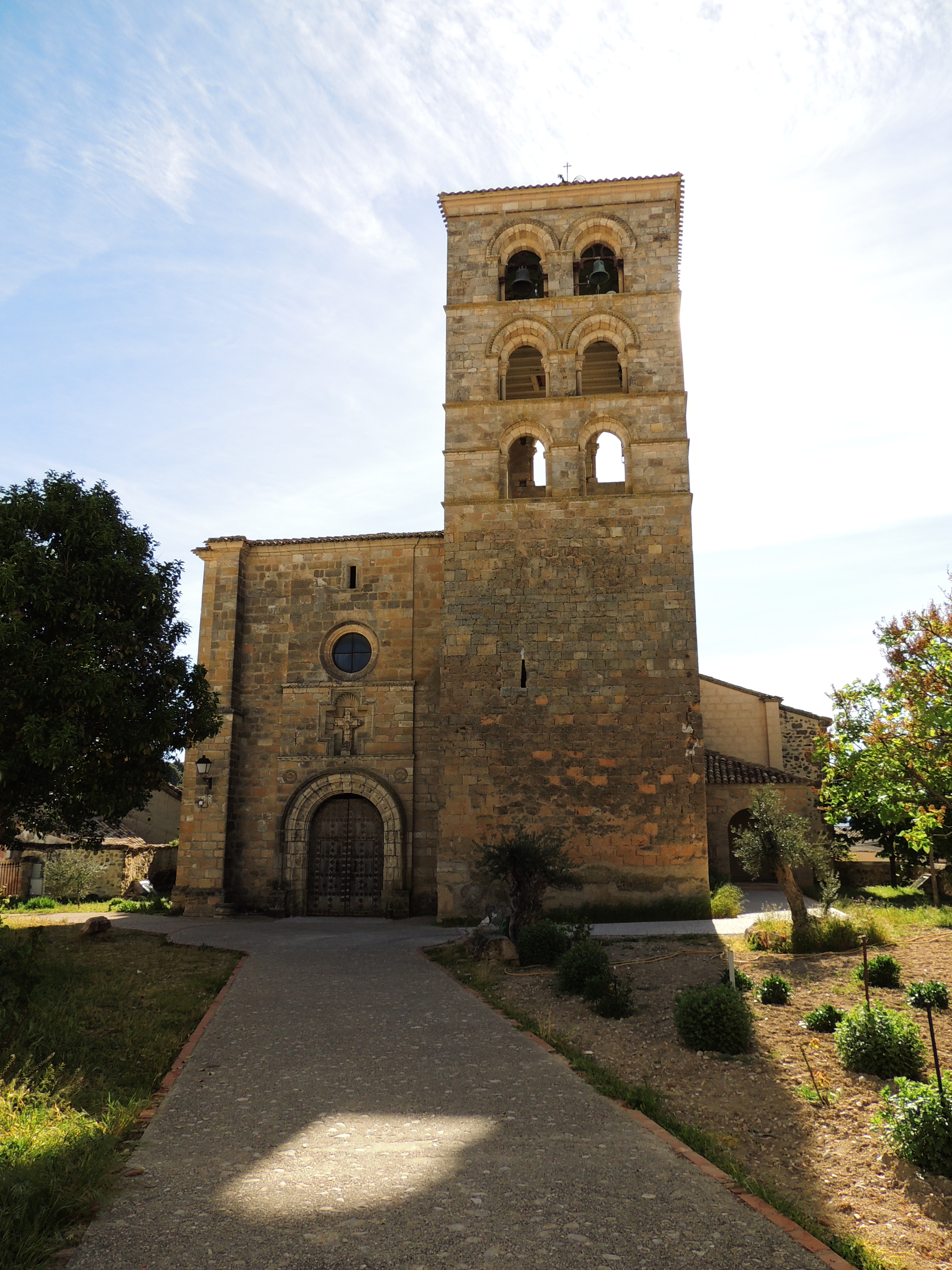
- Church of the Assumption of Valdeolivas

- Location within Spain Location within Castilla-La Mancha
- Coordinates: 40°30′N 2°26′W
- Country: Spain
- Autonomous community: Castile-La Mancha
- Province: Cuenca
- Municipality: Valdeolivas

Area
  - Total: 46 km^{2} (18 sq mi)

Population (2025-01-01)
  - Total: 206
  - Density: 4.5/km^{2} (12/sq mi)
- Time zone: UTC+1 (CET)
  - Summer (DST): UTC+2 (CEST)

Valdeolivas is a municipality located in the province of Cuenca, Castile-La Mancha, Spain. According to the 2004 census (INE), the municipality has a population of 269 inhabitants.
