= Iglesia de San Salvador (Fuentes) =

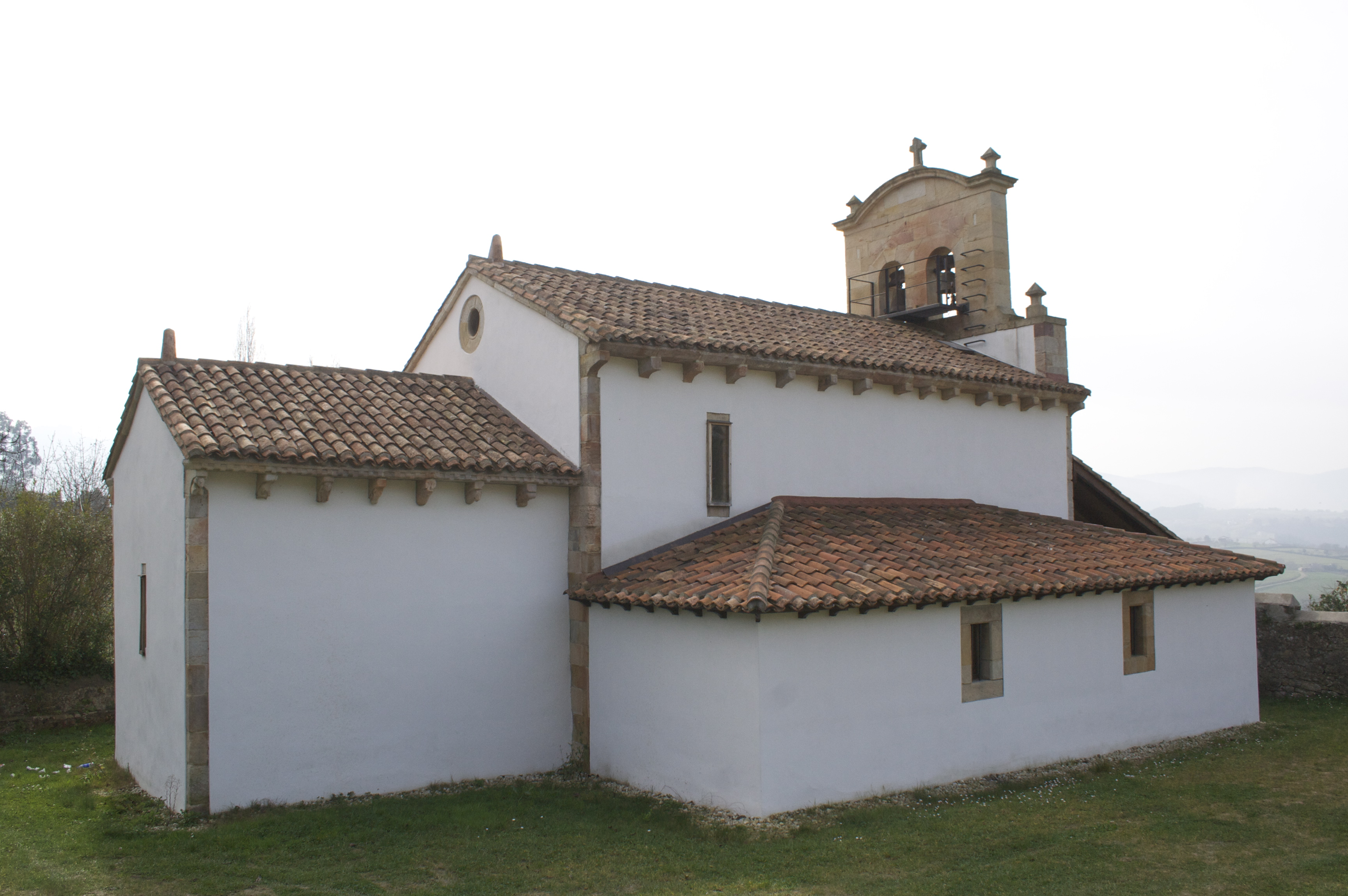
- Iglesia de San Salvador (Fuentes)
- Location: Asturias, Spain

Iglesia de San Salvador is a Romanesque-style, Roman Catholic church located in the town of Fuentes, in the council Asturian of Villaviciosa.

== History ==
The church of San Salvador is documented in 1021 (via an inscription) as due to the patronate of Diego Perez, and consecrated by Bishop Adaganeo I. The church appears to have been built in the 12th century. The diocese of Villaviciosa is mentioned in 1385 by the bishop of Oviedo, Gutierre de Toledo. The temple is mentioned in 1625 in documents of the Monastery of San Pelayo of Oviedo. In the 18th century it was a parish church. The church was declared an Artistic Historical Monument in 1931. During the Spanish Civil War the church was burned, it was reconstructed in its prior form in 1950.

A processional crucifix, a bejeweled silver cross, with gilded wood, semiprecious stones and a Roman cameo from the church, one of the pinnacles of goldsmithery in medieval Asturian, were stolen in 1898 and sold to French and then American private collectors. In 1917 J. Pierpont Morgan donated it to the Metropolitan Museum in New York, where it now is exhibited.
