= Guillén Pérez de Guzmán =

- Born: c. 1180
- Died: 1233
- Noble family: Guzmán
- Father: Pedro Rodríguez de Guzmán
- Mother: Mahalda

Guillén Pérez de Guzmán (ca. 1180 (Note: His parents were married around May 1174 when King Alfonso VIII of Castile gave the couple a wedding gift consisting of several properties.He had two older brothers as well as two sisters.)–1233), a member of the House of Guzmán, one of the most aristocratic of the Kingdom of Castile, was the maternal grandfather of Queen Beatrice of Castile, Queen Consort of Portugal as the wife of King Alfonso III. His father was Pedro Rodríguez de Guzmán—killed in the Battle of Alarcos on July 18, 1195 and son of Rodrigo Muñoz de Guzmán—and Mahalda (Note: In old genealogical treatises, Pedro's wife is said to be a member of the Manzanedo family although this filiation is not confirmed in medieval charters. Jaime de Salazar y Acha suggests that she could have been an illegitimate daughter of William VIII of Montpellier and, therefore, half-sister of Maria of Montpellier, the mother of King James I of Aragon.) With his brothers Nuño and Theobald, he fought alongside King Alfonso VIII at the decisive Battle of Las Navas de Tolosa in 1212. Even though his kinsmen supported the Laras during the crisis that ensued after the death of King Alfonso VIII, Guillén, probably because of his marriage to a member of the Girón clan, supported Queen Berengaria of Castile and her son, the future king Ferdinand III.

== Marriage and issue ==
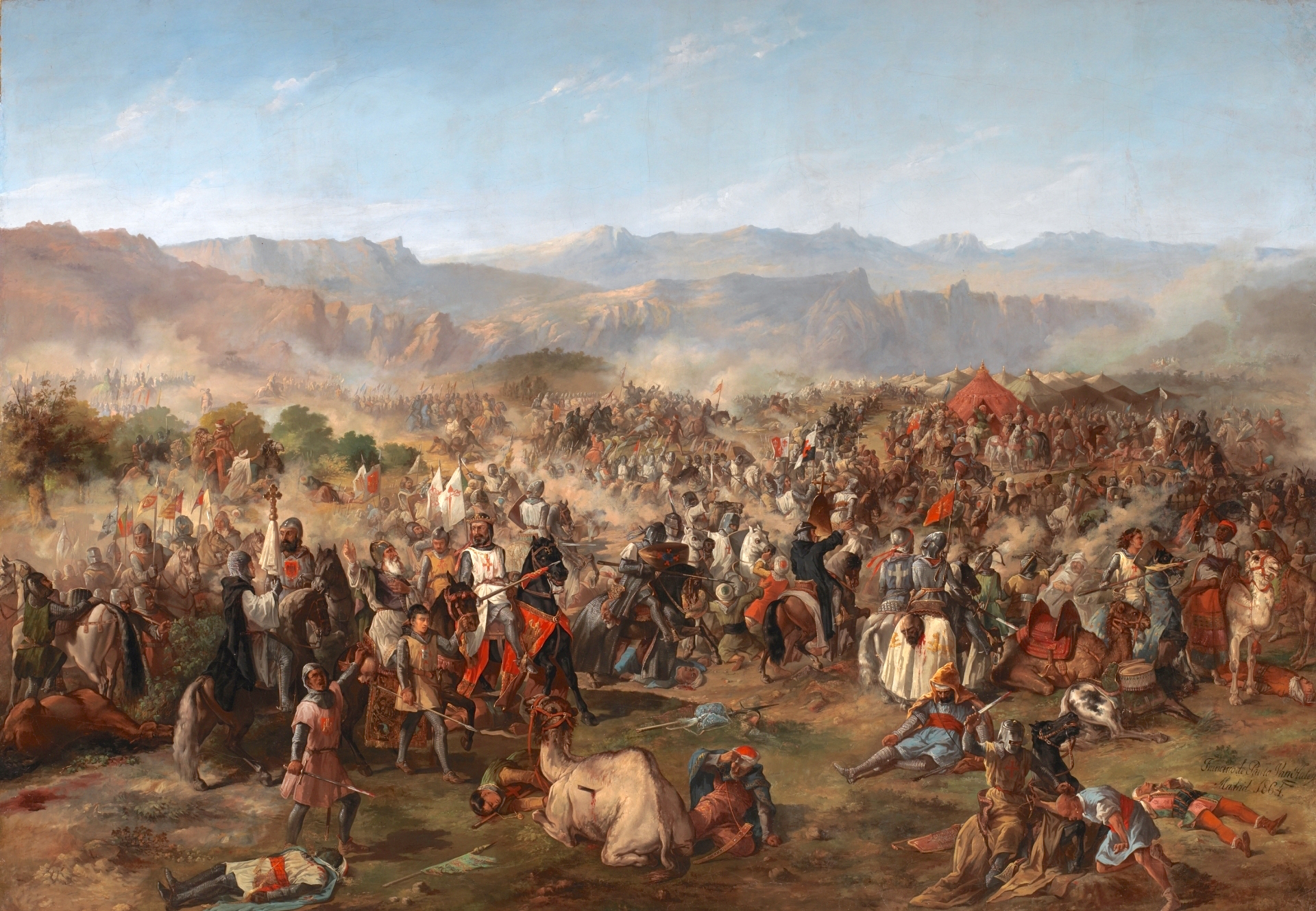
Depiction of the Battle of Las Navas de Tolosa by 19th-century painter Francisco de Paula Van Halen, exhibited at the Senate building in Madrid.

He married, probably before 1217 and certainly before May 1222, María González Girón (Note: On May 8, 1222, Gonzalo Rodríguez Girón, accompanied by his children and by his second wife, confirmed a donation of a hospital to the Cathedral of Palencia. María also signs the charter with the consent of her husband Guillén.) daughter of Gonzalo Rodríguez Girón and Sancha Rodríguez. (Note: Sancha Rodríguez was made daughter of a hypothetical Rodrigo Rodríguez de Lara by late-17th century genealogist Luis de Salazar y Castro. Recently, Jaime de Salazar y Acha presented evidence that she was instead daughter of the royal alférez Rodrigo Fernández de Toroño and his wife Aldonza Pérez, an heiress of the Banu Gómez family.) María, after the death of her husband Guillén, married Gil Vasques de Soverosa, with issue. Guillén Pérez de Guzmán and his wife María were the parents of:

- Nuño Guillén de Guzmán, married to Teresa Álvarez de Manzanedo
- Pedro Núñez de Guzmán, adelantado mayor of Castile and father of Alonso Pérez de Guzmán.
- Mayor Guillén de Guzmán, mistress of King Alfonso X of Castile with whom he had a daughter, Beatrice of Castile, the wife of King Afonso III of Portugal.

== Bibliography ==
- Martín Prieto, Pablo (January–June 2005). "La fundación del monasterio de Santa Clara de Alcocer (1252-1260)". Hispania Sacra (in Spanish). LVII (115). Madrid: 227–241. OCLC 844065330. Archived from the original on 2013-11-13.
- Martínez Díez, Gonzalo (1994). "Orígenes familiares de Santo Domingo, los linajes de Aza y Guzmán". In Aniz Iriarte, Cándido; Díaz Martín, Luis Vicente (eds.). Santo Domingo de Caleruega, en su contexto socio-político, 1170–1221. Editorial San Esteban. pp. 173–228. ISBN 84-87557-77-5.
- Salazar y Acha, Jaime de (1989). "Los descendientes del conde Ero Fernández, fundador de Monasterio de Santa María de Ferreira de Pallares". El Museo de Pontevedra (in Spanish) (43): 67–86. ISSN 0210-7791.
- Salazar y Acha, Jaime de; Masnata y de Quesada, David (1990). "Precisiones y nuevos datos sobre el entorno familiar de Alfonso X el Sabio fundador de Ciudad Real" (PDF). Cuadernos de Estudios Manchegos (in Spanish) (20). Instituto de Estudios Manchegos: 210–231. ISSN 0526-2623. Archived from the original (PDF) on 2013-11-13.
- Sánchez de Mora, Antonio (2003). La nobleza castellana en la plena Edad Media: el linaje de Lara (PhD) (in Spanish). Universidad de Sevilla. hdl:11441/15220.
- Sotto Mayor Pizarro, José Augusto (1997). Linhagens Medievais Portuguesas: Genealogias e Estratégias (1279-1325) (in Portuguese). Oporto: Thesis, published by author. hdl:10216/18023.
- Villalba Ruiz de Toledo, Francisco Javier (1989). "El Monasterio de Santa Clara de Alcocer y su conexión con la monarquía (siglos XIII-XV)" (PDF). Wad Al-Hayara: Work de Estudios de Guadalajara (in Spanish) (16): 319–324. ISSN 0214-7092. Archived from the original (PDF) on 2013-11-13.
