= Santo Tirso Monastery =

Coordinates: 41°20′42.1″N 8°28′18.5″W

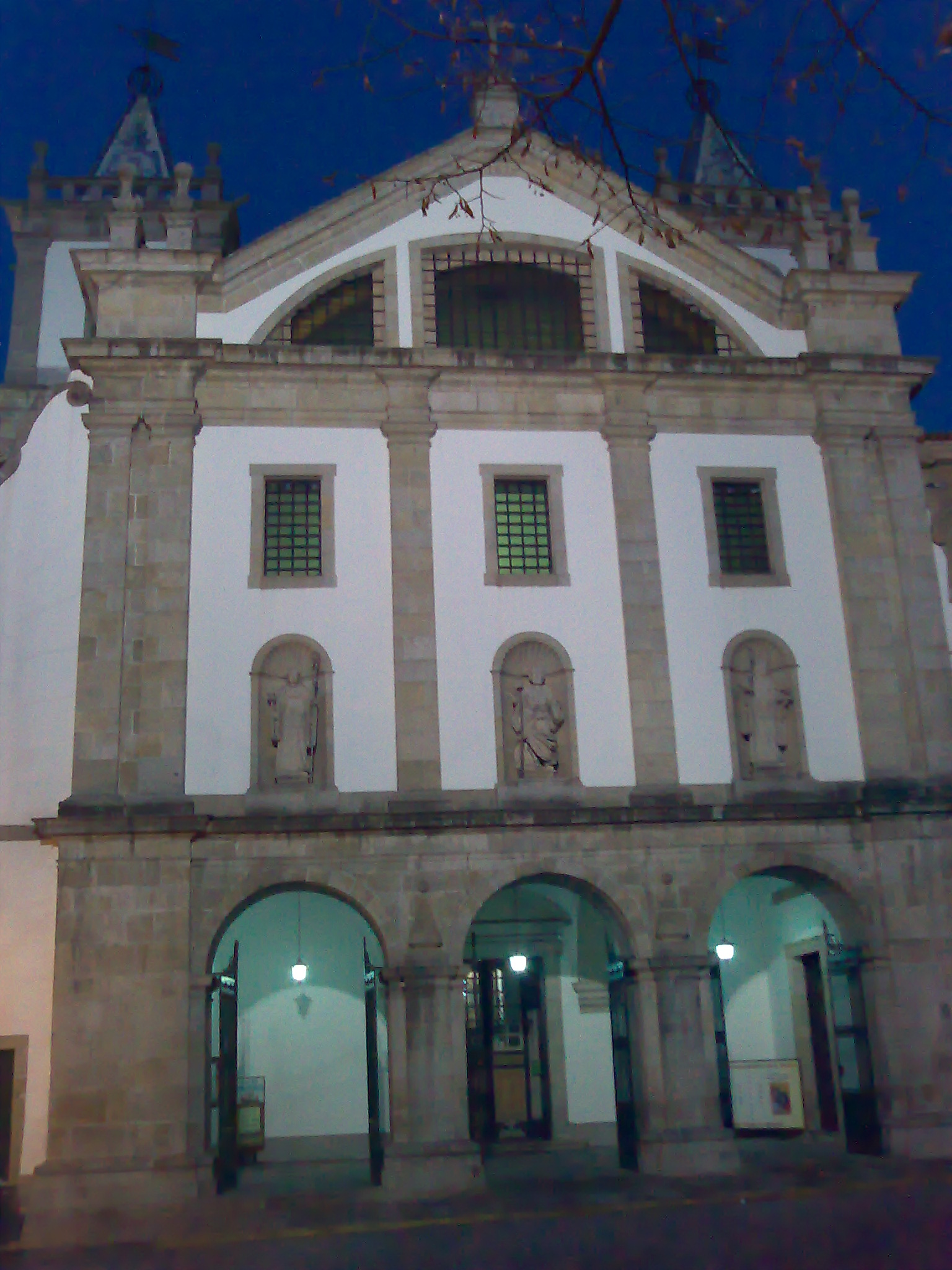
Santo Tirso Monastery

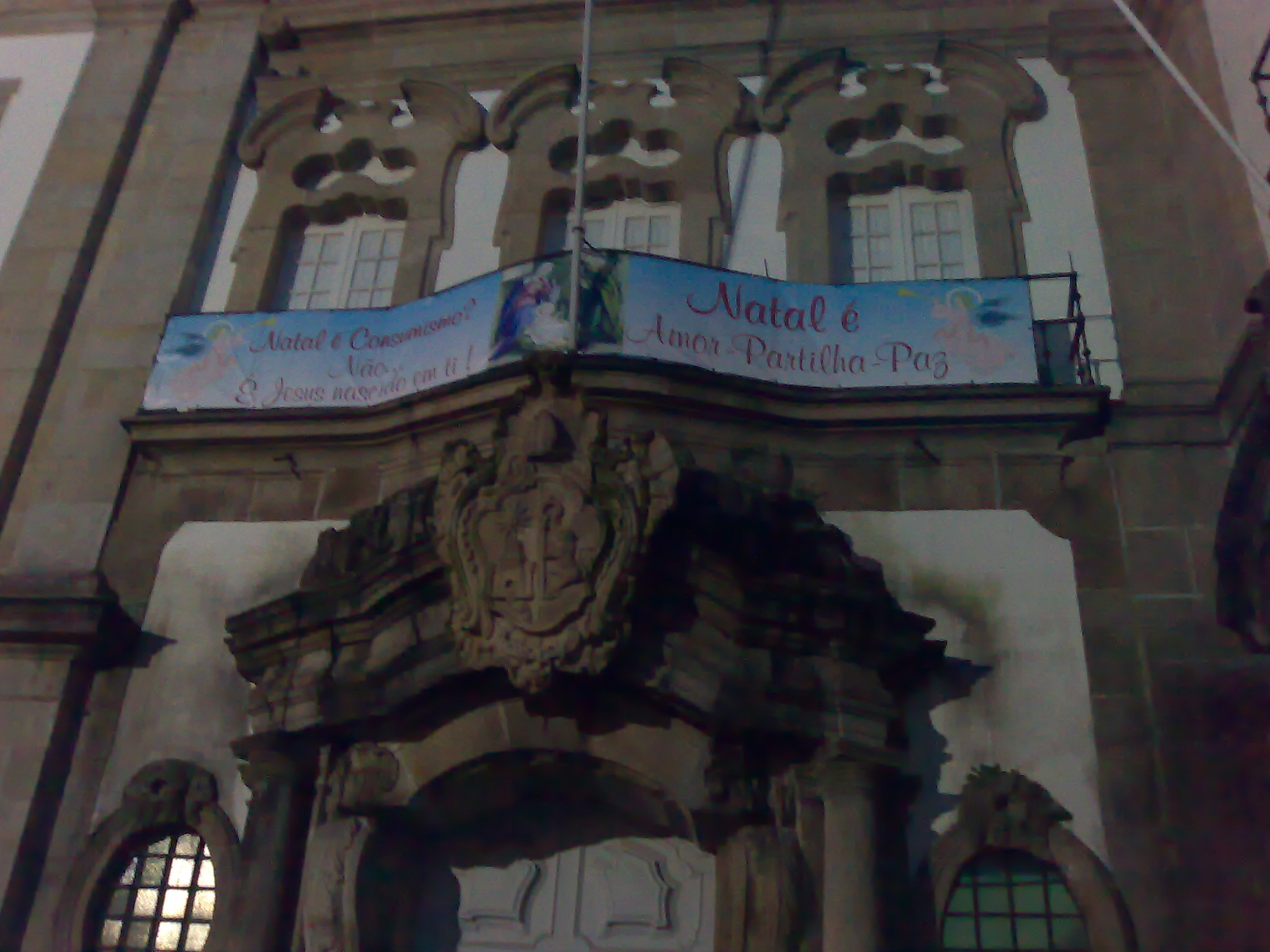
Detail of the Monastery

Monastery of Santo Tirso (or also Monastery of São Bento) is a monastery located in the parish of Santo Tirso, municipality of Santo Tirso, in Portugal, that was of the Benedictine Order.

The monastery was founded in 978 by Unisco Godins, wife of Aboazar Lovesendes, first lord of Maia and ancestor of this family.

On 23 November 1097, count Henrique and his wife Teresa donated land, defining the boundaries, and other properties to Soeiro Mendes da Maia, a descendant of Unisco and Abunazar. Soeiro, in turn, on 23 March 1098 donated these properties to the Abbot of the monastery, Gaudemiro, making the monastery one of the richest and relevant in the country. It was awarded Bulls of protection by the Popes Innocent III and Honorius III.

The original monastic church was built in 978. It was replaced by another one in 1090, which, in turn, was replaced by another one built in the early 14th century with the funds donated for its construction by Martim Gil de Riba de Vizela, Count of Barcelos. From this church there are some archaeological remains. On 15 October 1385, and 6, 7 August of 1409 the monastery was visited by King John I of Portugal.

The present church was built in 1659–79, with a project by Br. João Turriano, son of a Milanese architect, Leonardo Turriano. It has a processional Latin cross and a single nave. The facade has three niches in which are housed the sculptures of Santo Tirso in the center, flanked by S. Bento and Santa Escolástica. In the tympanum is inscribed the date of 1679 that, hypothetically, represents the term of the construction of the church.

The monastery owned lands and other assets that had been donated by members of the nobility, particularly by the Maias, the founding family, until the 19th century, when im 1834 the State expropriated the properties of the religious orders and closed the monasteries. On 11 May of that year, 46 days after the removal of the monks of S. Bento, the Interim Municipal Commission of the future municipality of Santo Tirso was taken over, which would be based in one of the monastery buildings.

After secularization the monastery was divided; one part for private individuals, the other for public offices (Town Hall – in the old convent inns, the Court and Administration of the county) and the Conde S. Bento Agricultural Asylum, and one last part for parish residence.

The monastery has been classified as a National Monument since 1982.

== Bibliography ==
- Alves Moura, Vera Lúcia (2014). O diálogo com o mosteiro beneditino de Santo Tirso (PDF) (Masters) (in Portuguese). Universidade do Minho. Escola de Arquitectura.
- Carvalho Correia, Francisco (2008). O Mosteiro de Santo Tirso de 978 a 1588: a silhueta de uma entidade projectada no chao de uma história milenária (in Portuguese) (1st ed.). Santiago de Compostela: Universidade de Santiago de Compostela: Servizo de Publicacións e Intercambio Científico. ISBN 978-84-9887-038-1. Archived from the original on October 4, 2013.
- Rei, António (2001). "Os Riba de Vizela, Senhores de Terena ((1259—1312)" [The Riba de Vizela, Lords of Terena]. Revista Callipole (in Portuguese) (9): 13–22. ISSN 0872-5225.
