= Afonso III of Portugal =

King of Portugal from 1248 to 1279

Afonso III
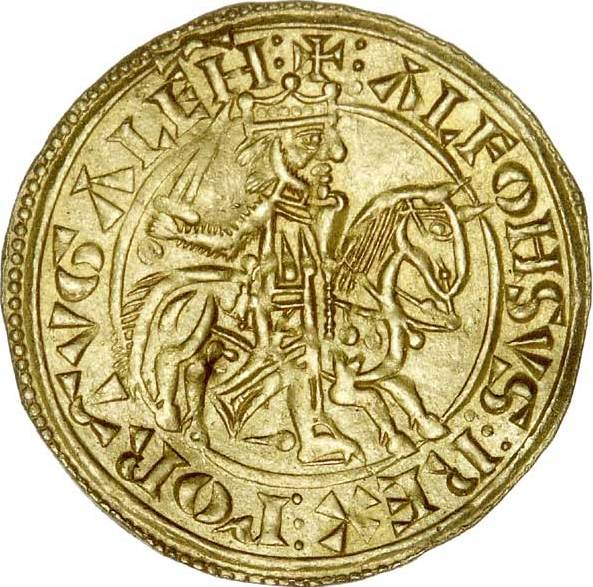
- Effigy on a contemporary coin

King of Portugal
- Reign: 4 January 1248 – 16 February 1279
- Predecessor: Sancho II
- Successor: Denis

Count of Boulogne
- Reign: 1238–1248
- Predecessor: Matilda II
- Successor: Matilda II
- Co-count: Matilda II
- Born: 5 May 1210; Coimbra, Portugal
- Died: 16 February 1279 (aged 68); Alcobaça, Portugal
- Burial: Monastery of Alcobaça, Alcobaça, Portugal
- Spouses: Matilda II, Countess of Boulogne (m. 1238; div. 1253) Beatrice of Castile (m. 1253)
- Issue among others...: (ill.) Martim Afonso Chichorro; (ill.) Urraca Afonso; Blanche, Lady of Las Huelgas; Denis, King of Portugal; Afonso, Lord of Portalegre; Infanta Sancha
- House: Burgundy
- Father: Afonso II of Portugal
- Mother: Urraca of Castile

Afonso III (Note: Portuguese pronunciation: [ɐˈfõsu]) (Note: rare English alternatives: Alphonzo or Alphonse, or Affonso (Archaic Portuguese), Alfonso or Alphonso (Portuguese-Galician) or Alphonsus (Latin).) (Afonso Afonso; 5 May 1210 – 16 February 1279), called the Boulonnais (Portuguese: o Bolonhês), was King of Portugal and the first to use the title King of Portugal and the Algarve, from 1249. He was the second son of King Afonso II of Portugal and Urraca of Castile; he succeeded his brother, King Sancho II of Portugal, who died on 4 January 1248.

His reign saw the final completion of the Portuguese Reconquista with the conquest of the Algarve in 1249, establishing the modern continental borders of Portugal. Afonso III also played a pivotal role in the institutional development of the kingdom; in 1254, he convened the Cortes of Leiria, the first Portuguese parliament to include representatives from the common towns alongside the nobility and clergy. Additionally, he transferred the royal seat to Lisbon and implemented administrative reforms that restricted the growing economic power of the Catholic Church, which ultimately led to his excommunication by Pope Gregory X.

== Early life ==
Afonso was born in Coimbra. As the second son of King Afonso II of Portugal, he was not expected to inherit the throne, which was destined to go to his elder brother Sancho.

He lived mostly in France, where he married Countess Matilda II of Boulogne in 1238, thereby becoming count of Boulogne, Mortain, Aumale and Dammartin-en-Goële jure uxoris.

== Reign ==
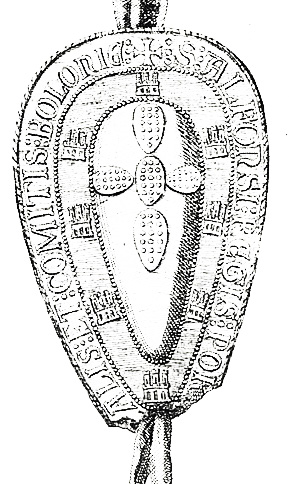
1266 seal of Afonso III.

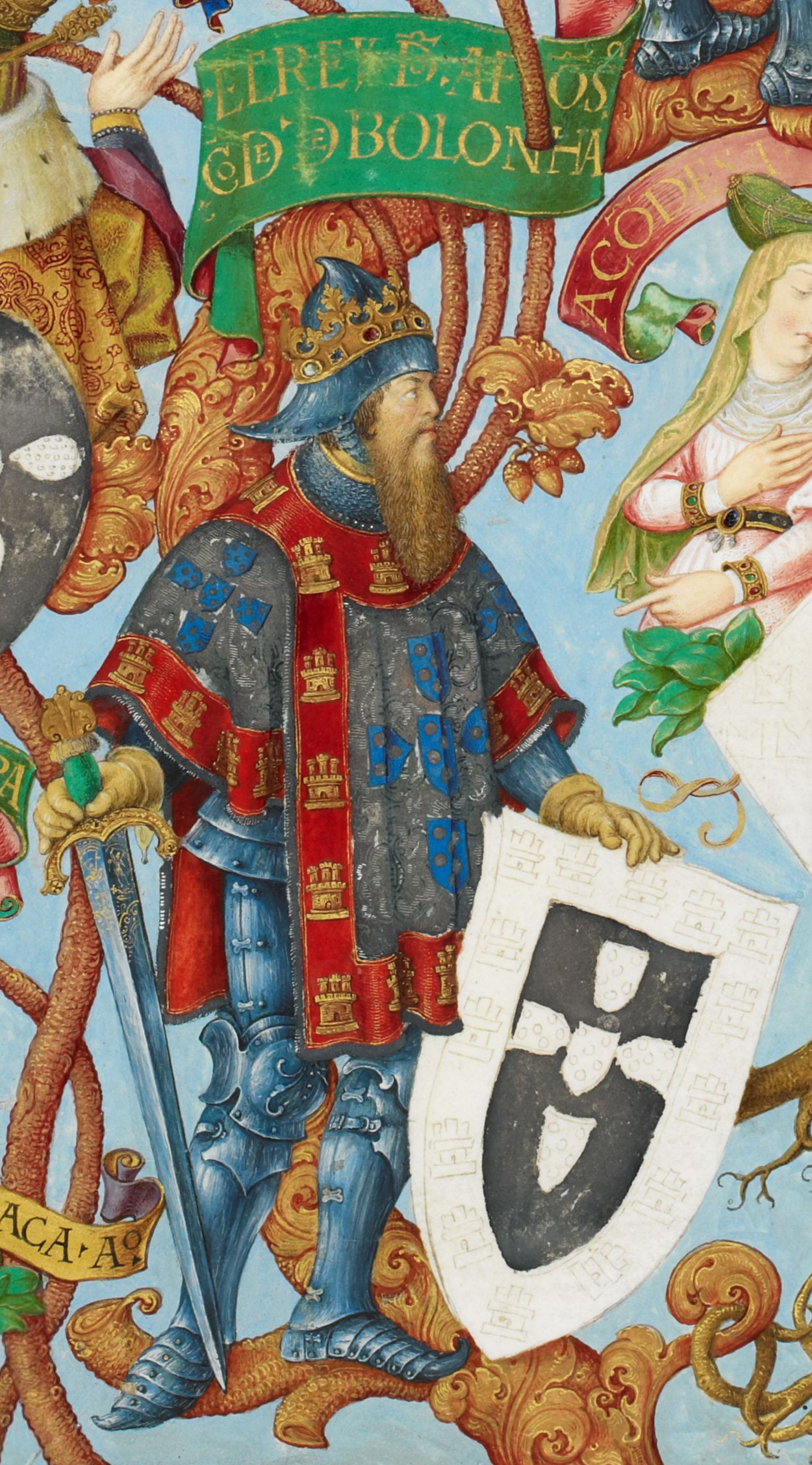
Afonso III in a 16th-century illumination from the Genealogia dos Reis de Portugal

In 1245, conflicts between his brother, the king, and the church became unbearable. Pope Innocent IV ordered Sancho II to be removed from the throne and to be replaced by the Count of Boulogne. Afonso did not refuse the papal order and consequently marched to Portugal. Since Sancho was not a popular king the order was not hard to enforce, and he fled into exile to Toledo, Castile, where he died on 4 January 1248. Until his brother's death and his own eventual coronation, Afonso retained and used the title of Visitador, Curador e Defensor do Reino (Overseer, Curator and Defender of the Kingdom).

In order to ascend the throne Afonso abdicated his rights to the county of Boulogne in 1248. In 1253, he divorced Matilda in order to marry Beatrice of Castile, illegitimate daughter of Alfonso X, King of Castile, and Mayor Guillén de Guzmán.

Determined not to make the same mistakes as his brother, Afonso III paid special attention to what the middle class, composed of merchants and small land owners, had to say. In 1254, in the city of Leiria, he held the first session of the Cortes, a general assembly comprising the nobility, the middle class and representatives of all municipalities. He also made laws intended to restrain the upper classes from abusing the least favored part of the population. Remembered as a notable administrator, Afonso III founded several towns, granted the title of city to many others and reorganized public administration.

Afonso showed extraordinary vision for the time. Progressive measures taken during his kingship include: representatives of the commons, besides the nobility and clergy, were involved in governance; the end of preventive arrests such that henceforward all arrests had to be first presented to a judge to determine the detention measure; and fiscal innovation, such as negotiating extraordinary taxes with the mercantile classes and direct taxation of the Church, rather than debasement of the coinage. These may have led to his excommunication by the Holy See and possibly precipitated his death, and his son Denis's premature rise to the throne at only 18 years old.

Secure on the throne, Afonso III then proceeded to make war with the Muslim communities that still thrived in the south. In his reign the Algarve became part of the kingdom, following the capture of Faro.

=== Final years and death ===
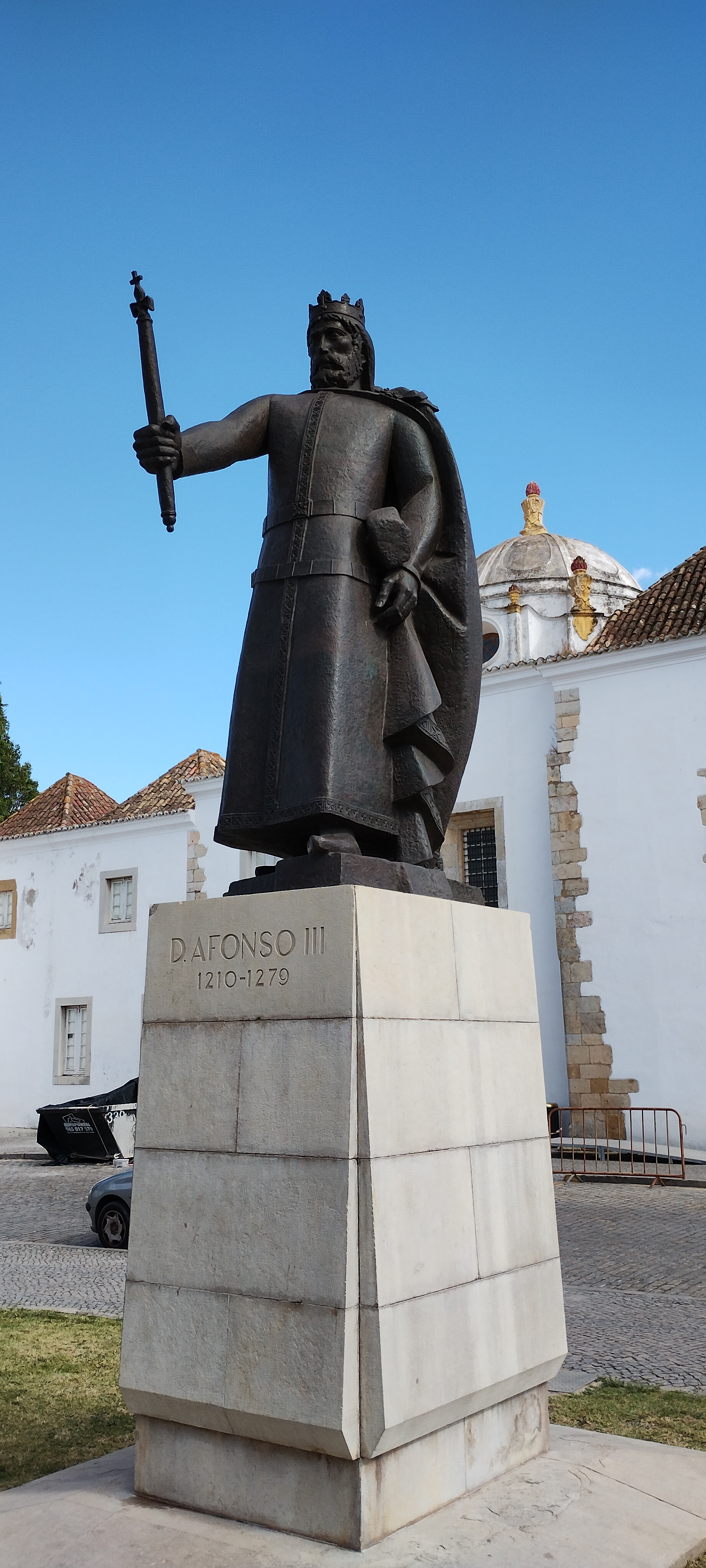
A statue of Afonso in Faro, Portugal

Following his success against the Moors, Afonso III had to deal with a political situation concerning the country's borders with Castile. The neighbouring kingdom considered that the newly acquired lands of the Algarve should be Castilian, not Portuguese, which led to a series of wars between the two kingdoms. Finally, in 1267, the Treaty of Badajoz was signed in Badajoz, determining that the southern border between Castile and Portugal should be the River Guadiana, as it is today.

Afonso died in Alcobaça, Coimbra or Lisbon, aged 68.

== Marriages and descendants ==
Afonso's first wife was Matilda II, Countess of Boulogne, daughter of Renaud, Count of Dammartin, and Ida, Countess of Boulogne. They had no surviving children. He divorced Matilda in 1253 and, in the same year, married Beatrice of Castile, illegitimate daughter of Alfonso X, King of Castile, and Mayor Guillén de Guzmán.

Name	Birth	Death	Notes
By Matilda II of Boulogne (c. 1202–1262; married in 1238)
By Beatrice of Castile (1242–1303; married in 1253)
Blanche	25 February 1259	17 April 1321	Lady of Las Huelgas
Denis	9 October 1261	7 January 1325	Succeeded him as Denis, 6th King of Portugal. Married Infanta Elizabeth of Aragon.
Afonso	8 February 1263	2 November 1312	Lord of Portalegre. Married Infanta Violante Manuel (daughter of Manuel of Castile).
Sancha	2 February 1264	c. 1284	
Maria	1265	c. 1266	
Vicente	1268	1268	
Fernando	1269	1269	
By Madragana (Mor Afonso) (c. 1230–?)
Martim Afonso Chichorro	c. 1250	c. 1313	Natural son; Married to Inês Lourenço de Valadares.
Urraca Afonso	c. 1260	?	Natural daughter. Married twice: 1st to Pedro Anes de Riba Vizela, 2nd to João Mendes de Briteiros.
By Maria Peres de Enxara (?–?)
Afonso Dinis	?	a. 1322	Natural son; Married to D. Maria Pais Ribeira, Lady of the House of Sousa.
By Elvira Esteves (?–?)
Leonor Afonso (nun)	?	c. 1302	Natural daughter; Nun in the Monastery of Santa Clara of Santarém.
Other natural offspring
Fernando Afonso	?	?	Natural son; Knight of the Order of the Hospital.
Gil Afonso	1250	31 December 1346	Natural son; Knight of the Order of the Hospital.
Rodrigo Afonso	b. 1258	b. 12 May 1272	Natural son; Prior of the city of Santarém.
Leonor Afonso	?	26 February 1291	Natural daughter. Married twice: 1st to D. Estevão Anes de Sousa (without issue), 2nd to D. Gonçalo Garcia de Sousa, Count of Neiva (without issue).
Urraca Afonso (nun)	?	4 November 1281	Natural daughter; Nun in the Monastery of Lorvão.

== See also ==
- Timeline of Portuguese history (First Dynasty)
- Portugal in the Middle Ages
  - Portugal in the Reconquista

Afonso III of Portugal House of Burgundy Cadet branch of the Capetian dynasty Born: 5 May 1210 Died: 16 February 1279
Regnal titles
Preceded by Sancho II	King of Portugal; 1248–1279	Succeeded by Denis
Preceded by Matilda II as sole ruler	Count of Boulogne; 1238–1248	Succeeded by Matilda II as sole ruler
