= Palazuelos, Guadalajara =

Palazuelos
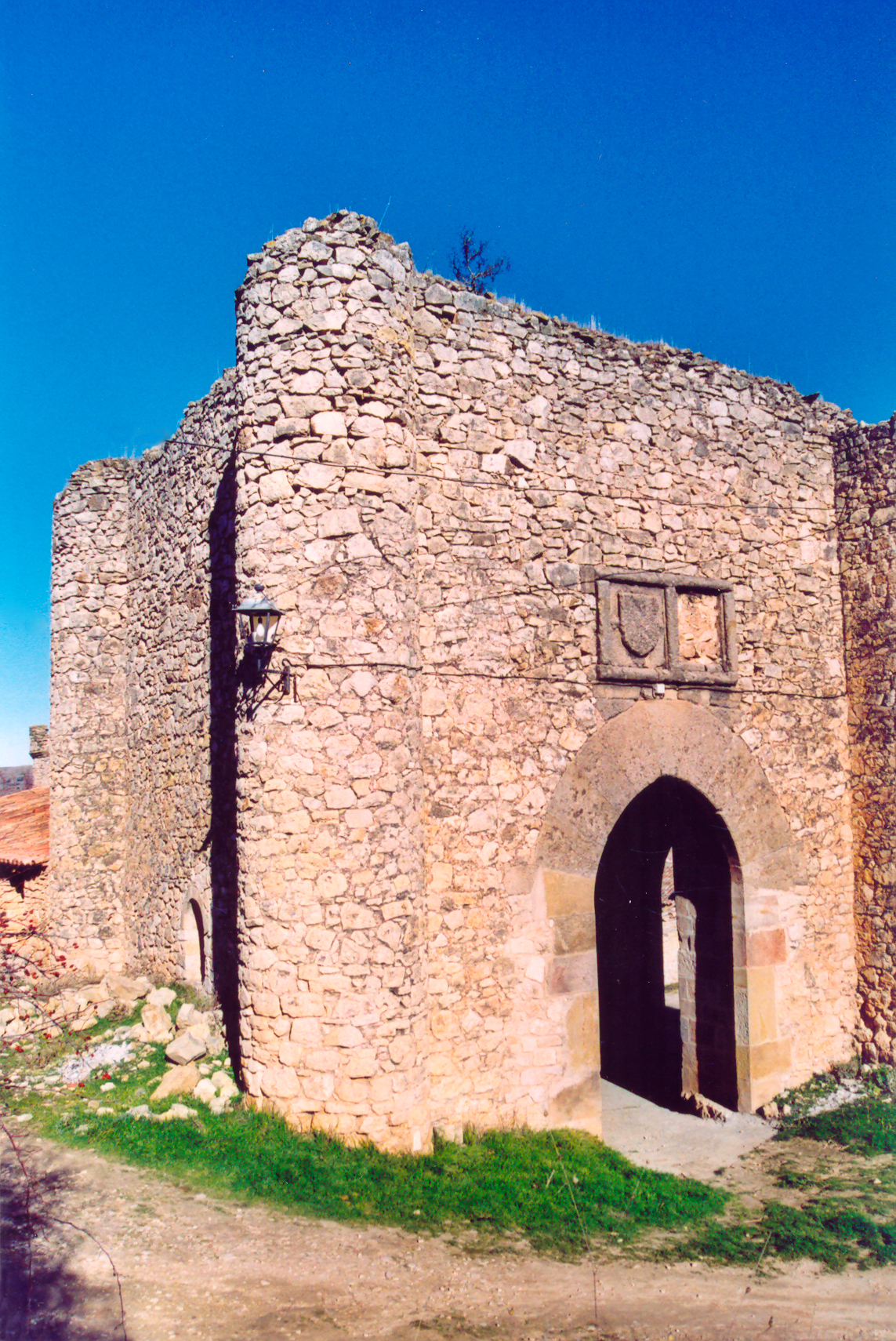
- The Gate of El Monte, Palazuelos.
- Interactive map of Palazuelos
- Coordinates: 41°5′27″N 2°41′30″W
- Country: Spain
- Autonomous community: Castile-La Mancha
- Province: Guadalajara
- Municipality: Sigüenza
- Elevation: 973 m (3,192 ft)

Population (2006)
  - Total: 48
- Time zone: UTC+1 (CET)
  - Summer (DST): UTC+2 (CEST)
- Website: http://www.murallasdepalazuelos.com

Palazuelos is a village in the Spanish province of Guadalajara, in the north of the autonomous community of Castilla-La Mancha. Presently it is included in the city limits of Sigüenza, due to its small population.

Palazuelos contains an important monumental site formed by its castle and its city walls, protected by law of the government of Castilla-La Mancha.
