= Count of Sabugal =

- Coronet of a Portuguese count
- Creation date: 20 February 1582
- Created by: Philip I of Portugal
- Peerage: Kingdom of Portugal
- First holder: Dom Duarte de Castelo Branco
- Last holder: Dom Miguel Pedro de Melo de Assis Mascarenhas (monarchy abolished)
- Present holder: Kristian Luiz Austad de Vasconcellos e Sousa (claimant)
- Extinction date: 1910 (monarchy abolished)

The Count of Sabugal (in Portuguese: Conde de Sabugal) was a Portuguese title of nobility created by letters patent of 20 February 1582 issued by King Philip I of Portugal for Dom Duarte de Castelo Branco, Chief Bailiff of the Realm (meirinho-mor do Reino). The letters patent were entered in the royal chancery on 28 July 1588.

The title was linked to the office of Chief Bailiff of the Realm, which the family had held since 1536. Through the first marriage of the 3rd Countess, the House of Sabugal was merged into that of Palma, and through the marriage of the 4th Countess to the 2nd Count of Óbidos, the three houses were united in a single line. From then on the title was used together with those of Count of Óbidos and Count of Palma.

== History ==
The 1st Count, Dom Duarte de Castelo Branco (c. 1540–1618), a paternal grandson of the 1st Count of Vila Nova de Portimão, inherited the office of Chief Bailiff from his father and served as vedor da Fazenda (overseer of the Treasury). After serving King Sebastian as ambassador to Castile and being taken prisoner at the Battle of Alcácer Quibir, he sided with Philip II in the succession crisis of 1580 and joined his Council of State, receiving the title in 1582. Between 1593 and 1600 he was one of the five governors of the Realm.

He was succeeded by his son, Dom Francisco de Castelo Branco, Chief Bailiff and alcaide-mor of Santarém, and Dom Francisco in turn by his daughter and heiress, Dona Beatriz (or Brites) de Meneses, 3rd Countess. Her first marriage, in 1638, to Dom Nuno Mascarenhas da Costa, heir to the House of Palma, led to the House of Sabugal being merged into the latter. Her second husband, Dom João Mascarenhas, general of cavalry in the Restoration War, used the title jure uxoris.

In 1669 the 3rd Countess's granddaughter, Dona Beatriz Mascarenhas da Costa Castelo Branco Barreto, 4th Countess of Sabugal and 3rd Countess of Palma, married Dom Fernando Martins Mascarenhas, 2nd Count of Óbidos, who used the title jure uxoris. From then on, the houses of Sabugal, Palma and Óbidos had the same head.

In the following generations the title was not renewed, although the heads of the House of Óbidos kept the House of Sabugal and the office of Chief Bailiff. It was used again by Dom Manuel de Assis Mascarenhas Castelo Branco da Costa e Lancastre (1778–1839), son of the 4th Count of Óbidos and a Peer of the Realm, who was better known as Count of Sabugal.

In 1839 his daughter, Dona Eugénia Maria de Assis Mascarenhas, 6th Countess, married Dom Pedro Maria Bruno de Sousa Coutinho Monteiro Paim, son of the 1st Marquis of Santa Iria. He used the title jure uxoris, and these houses were thus united with that of Santa Iria. The title passed to the couple's sons and then to their grandson. After the grandson died without issue in 1905, it passed to the sons of Dona Mariana de Assis Mascarenhas, daughter of the 6th Countess: Dom Miguel Pedro and Dom Pedro de Melo de Assis Mascarenhas.

== Counts of Sabugal (1582) ==
#	Holder	Dates	Titles	Notes	Ref.
1	Dom Duarte de Castelo Branco	c. 1540 – 1618	1st Count of Sabugal	First holder, created count by letters patent of 20 February 1582 by Philip I. Son of Dom Afonso de Castelo Branco, Chief Bailiff, and Dona Isabel de Castro. Chief Bailiff of the Realm, overseer of the Treasury, member of the Council of State and governor of the Realm (1593–1600). He married Dona Catarina de Meneses and had children.	
2	Dom Francisco de Castelo Branco	d. 1644 or 1647	2nd Count of Sabugal	Son of the preceding. Chief Bailiff of the Realm, alcaide-mor of Santarém and commander of Castelo de Vide in the Order of Christ. He married Dona Luísa Coutinho, daughter and heiress of Dom João Coutinho, alcaide-mor of Santarém, and had children.	
3	Dona Beatriz de Meneses	—	3rd Countess of Sabugal	Daughter and heiress of the preceding. Through her first marriage, to Dom Nuno Mascarenhas da Costa, heir to the House of Palma, the House of Sabugal was merged into that of Palma. Her second husband, Dom João Mascarenhas, used the title jure uxoris; he was general of cavalry and military governor of the Alentejo during the Restoration War.	
4	Dona Beatriz Mascarenhas da Costa Castelo Branco Barreto	—	4th Countess of Sabugal	Granddaughter of the preceding, daughter of Dom João de Mascarenhas de Castelo Branco da Costa, 2nd Count of Palma, a son of the 3rd Countess's first marriage. She was also 3rd Countess of Palma. She married Dom Fernando Martins Mascarenhas, 2nd Count of Óbidos, who used the title jure uxoris, uniting the houses of Sabugal, Palma and Óbidos (1669).	
5	Dom Manuel de Assis Mascarenhas Castelo Branco da Costa e Lancastre	18 July 1778 – 5 February 1839	5th Count of Sabugal (5th Count of Óbidos)	A descendant of the preceding holders, son of Dom José de Assis Mascarenhas, 4th Count of Óbidos. Chief Bailiff, Peer of the Realm (1826) and Portuguese minister in Brazil; he served in the Portuguese Legion and was awarded the Legion of Honour. In 1811 he married Dona Maria Ana Teles da Gama, daughter of the 7th Marquises of Nisa, and had children.	
6	Dona Eugénia Maria de Assis Mascarenhas	19 November 1813 – 17 August 1847	6th Countess of Sabugal	Daughter of the preceding; she was also 6th Countess of Óbidos and 7th Countess of Palma. In 1839 she married Dom Pedro Maria Bruno de Sousa Coutinho Monteiro Paim, a frigate captain, son of the 1st Marquis of Santa Iria and 3rd Count of Alva, who used the title jure uxoris.	
7	Dom Manuel de Assis Mascarenhas de Sousa Coutinho	19 October 1841 – 29 July 1859	7th Count of Sabugal	Eldest son of the preceding; died unmarried.	
8	Dom Luís António de Assis Mascarenhas de Castelo-Branco de Sousa Coutinho	13 June 1844 – 4 July 1880	8th Count of Sabugal	Brother of the preceding. Naval officer and honorary Officer-Major of the Royal Household. In 1873 he married Dona Ana Rufina de Melo Breyner (1849–1903), daughter of the 1st Counts of Melo, and had children.	
9	Dom Pedro de Assis Mascarenhas	19 June 1874 – 12 December 1905	9th Count of Sabugal	Son of the preceding. Sub-lieutenant in the Navy; died unmarried and without issue.	
10	Dom Miguel Pedro de Melo de Assis Mascarenhas	18 January 1870 – 18 August 1945	10th Count of Sabugal	Cousin of the preceding. Son of Dona Mariana de Assis Mascarenhas, sister of the 7th and 8th Counts of Sabugal, and of Dom Joaquim Sebastião Maria de Melo.	

== Claimants under the Republic ==
Following the establishment of the Republic in 1910, the state stopped granting titles of nobility. Since then, the following members of the family have claimed to represent the title:

#	Name	Dates	Titles claimed	Notes	Ref.
11	Dom Pedro de Melo de Assis Mascarenhas	1874–1947	11th Count of Sabugal	Brother of the preceding, whom he succeeded in the representation of the titles of Count of Óbidos, Sabugal and Palma. Died unmarried. Maternal uncle of the 2nd Marquis of Santa Iria.	
12	José Luís de Andrade de Vasconcelos e Sousa	1924–2006	12th Count of Sabugal (3rd Marquis of Santa Iria)	Eldest son of the 2nd Marquis of Santa Iria and great-nephew of the 10th Count and of the preceding. Born on 9 September 1924, he was a Knight of Honour and Devotion of the Sovereign Military Order of Malta. In 1947 he married Dona Maria Teresa de Lancastre de Melo in Lisbon, daughter of the 3rd Viscount of Taveiro, a marriage that linked the family to the House of Santar and Magalhães.	
13	José Luís de Melo de Vasconcelos e Sousa	b. 1959	13th Count of Sabugal (4th Marquis of Santa Iria)	Eldest son of the preceding, born in Lisbon on 14 February 1959. He graduated in economics from the University of Lausanne and headed the Edmond de Rothschild Europe bank in Portugal. Together with his brother Pedro, he founded the Santar Vila Jardim project. He chairs the supervisory board of the Friends of the Ajuda Botanical Garden (Associação dos Amigos do Jardim Botânico da Ajuda). In September 2026 he was the subject of an episode of the SIC television segment Sangue Azul (Blue Blood).	
14	Kristian Luiz Austad de Vasconcellos e Sousa	b. 1992	14th Count of Sabugal	Son of the preceding. In September 2026 he was the subject of an episode of the SIC television segment Sangue Azul (Blue Blood).	
