= Count of Santar =

Noble title in the Kingdom of Portugal

- Creation date: 23 January 1904
- Created by: Carlos I of Portugal
- First holder: José Pedro Paulo de Melo de Figueiredo Pais do Amaral
- Last holder: José Pedro Paulo de Melo de Figueiredo Pais do Amaral (monarchy abolished)
- Present holder: José Luís de Melo de Vasconcelos e Sousa (claimant)
- Extinction date: 1910 (monarchy abolished)

José Pedro Paulo de Melo Figueiredo Pais do Amaral, 1st Count of Santar (1853–1914)

The Count of Santar (in Portuguese: Conde de Santar) was a Portuguese title of nobility created by King Carlos I by decree of 23 January 1904 for José Pedro Paulo de Melo de Figueiredo Pais do Amaral, 2nd Viscount of Taveiro.

The title is associated with the House of Santar and Magalhães, a manor house in the village of Santar, in the municipality of Nelas, which has belonged to the same family since the 16th century. Through the marriage of the 3rd Countess to the claimant to the title of Marquis of Santa Iria, the representation of the countship became linked to the houses of Santa Iria, Alva, Óbidos, Sabugal and Palma.

== History ==
=== Origins of the House of Santar ===
The estate that became the House of Santar was made a lordship and granted the privileges of a coutada (an exempt estate) in the 13th century by Sancho II. At the time it was known as Quinta do Casal Bom or, according to another source, Quinta do Bom Sucesso. In the 16th century it passed to the Pais do Amaral family, and João Gonçalves do Amaral began building the original core of the house. The entailed estate (vínculo) of Santar was founded by Francisco Pais do Amaral and his wife, Dona Francisca Pais, in 1660 or 1670, depending on the source. In the late 17th century, the marriage of the heiress, Dona Maria Luísa Pais do Amaral, to Francisco Lucas de Melo brought the Melo line into the house.

Over sixteen generations the family built up a significant collection, which includes the vestments and portrait of Cardinal Pedro Paulo de Figueiredo de Melo e Cunha. His services to the Crown led to the title of Viscount of Taveiro being granted to his great-niece, whose son became the 1st Count of Santar.

=== Origins of the title ===
The title of Count of Santar arose from the line of the Viscounts of Taveiro. The 1st Viscountess, Dona Maria Rosa de Figueiredo da Cunha de Eça Abreu e Melo Pereira de Lacerda e Lemos (1832–1882), married José de Melo Pais do Amaral de Sousa Pereira de Vasconcelos e Meneses, 7th administrator of the entailed estate of Santar, who was allowed to use his wife's title from 1849.

Their son, José Pedro Paulo de Melo de Figueiredo Pais do Amaral (1853–1914), was recognised as 2nd Viscount of Taveiro by decree of King Luís I of 11 July 1878, and was made Count of Santar by decree of King Carlos I of 23 January 1904.

After the 2nd Count, who had no children, the representation of the title passed to the line of his younger brother. That brother's granddaughter, Dona Maria Teresa de Lancastre de Melo, represented the titles of Count of Santar and Viscount of Taveiro. Her marriage in 1947 to José Luís de Andrade de Vasconcelos e Sousa, claimant to the title of Marquis of Santa Iria, joined the representation of the countship with those of the houses of Óbidos, Sabugal, Palma and Alva.

=== Properties ===
The oldest part of the House of Santar and Magalhães, the family's manor house in the village of Santar, dates from the Manueline period, and the house was extended in several later building campaigns. The chapel, dedicated to Saint Francis of Assisi, and the so-called Old Kitchen, begun around 1690 and fitted with an indoor fountain under a dome, date from the second half of the 17th century. The wine cellars, the central courtyard and the Horses' Fountain (Chafariz dos Cavalos), dated 1790, were built in the 18th century, and in the early 20th century the house gained a new colonnaded gallery.

The Baroque gardens are laid out along a central axis that runs through a series of terraces edged with clipped box and topped with topiary pyramids, ending in a terrace with a large elliptical granite pool. The layout has similarities with the gardens of the Biscainhos Palace in Braga. The veranda overlooking the garden is decorated with figuras de convite (welcoming figures) representing the four seasons, painted on azulejos by José Maria Pereira Júnior, known as Pereira Cão. The 2nd Count of Santar also commissioned him to make the tile panels on the Horses' Fountain, which show horsemen bearing the family's quarterings. The house also displays the christening cape of the 1st Marquis of Santa Iria, whose godparents were King Louis XVI and Queen Marie Antoinette.

In 2013 the heirs of the house launched the Santar Vila Jardim project, which linked several of the village's historic gardens and opened them to the public, following a plan by the Spanish landscape architect Fernando Caruncho. The project also led to a joint wine production, with Pedro de Vasconcelos e Sousa as oenologist. In October 2018 the house hosted the annual conference of the Portuguese Association of Historic Gardens (Associação Portuguesa dos Jardins Históricos).

== Counts of Santar (1904) ==
#	Holder	Dates	Titles	Notes	Ref.
1	José Pedro Paulo de Melo de Figueiredo Pais do Amaral	1853–1914	1st Count of Santar (2nd Viscount of Taveiro)	First holder. Son of the 1st Viscounts of Taveiro, he was born on 22 December 1853 and died on 24 April 1914. A fidalgo cavaleiro of the Royal Household and Lord of the House of Santar, he succeeded to the title of Viscount of Taveiro in 1878 and was made Count of Santar in 1904. In 1875 he married Dona Margarida Vieira de Magalhães, daughter of the Counts of Magalhães.	
2	Pedro Paulo de Melo de Figueiredo Pais do Amaral	1876–1941	2nd Count of Santar	Eldest son of the 1st Count, he was born in Lisbon on 5 August 1876 and died there on 8 October 1941. He married Dona Amália de Melo, widow of Admiral Brito Capelo, and had no children.	

== Claimants under the Republic ==
Following the establishment of the Republic in 1910, the state stopped granting titles of nobility. Since then, the following members of the family have claimed to represent the title:

#	Name	Dates	Titles claimed	Notes	Ref.
3	Maria Teresa de Lancastre de Melo	1928–2015	3rd Countess of Santar	Great-niece of the 2nd Count, she was the granddaughter of his younger brother and the only daughter of Pedro Paulo António de Melo de Figueiredo Pais do Amaral, 3rd Viscount of Taveiro, and Dona Maria Luísa Henriques de Lancastre. Born on 7 December 1928, she ran the House of Santar during the second half of the 20th century. In 1947, in Lisbon, she married José Luís de Andrade de Vasconcelos e Sousa, claimant to the title of Marquis of Santa Iria.	
4	José Luís de Melo de Vasconcelos e Sousa	b. 1959	4th Count of Santar	Eldest son of the preceding, born in Lisbon on 14 February 1959. He graduated in economics from the University of Lausanne and headed the Edmond de Rothschild Europe bank in Portugal. Together with his brother Pedro, he founded the Santar Vila Jardim project. He chairs the supervisory board of the Friends of the Ajuda Botanical Garden (Associação dos Amigos do Jardim Botânico da Ajuda). In September 2026 he was the subject of an episode of the SIC television segment Sangue Azul (Blue Blood).	
