= Lenda de Gaia =

Medieval Portuguese legend

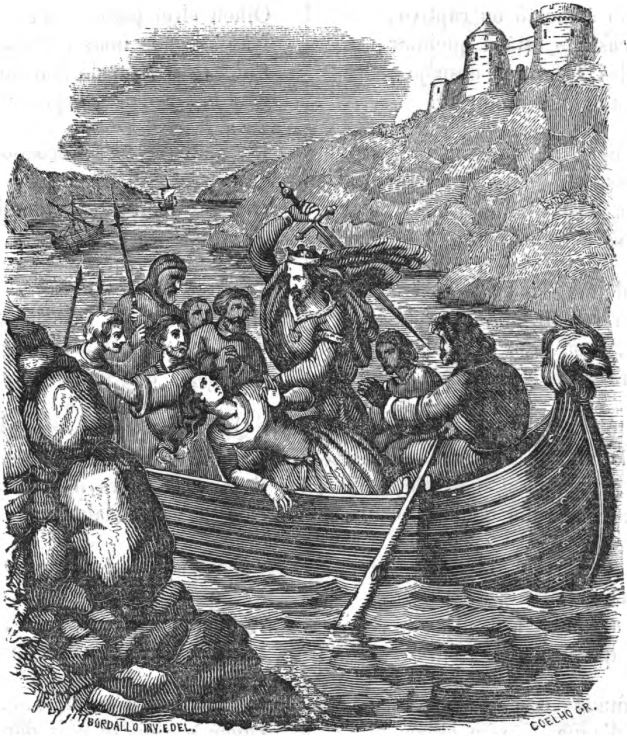
Ramiro beheads Gaia, from an illustrated edition of Almeida Garrett's poem Miragaia (1844).

The Lenda de Gaia (Legend of Gaia) is a medieval Portuguese legend recorded in two manuscripts, the Livro Velho (1286/1290) and the Livro de Linhagens do Conde Dom Pedro (1340/1383), both of which are collections of aristocratic genealogies embellished with a mix of history and legend. The Lenda de Gaia concerns the tenth-century king Ramiro II of León and the origins of the Maia family. The main events take place in Gaia at the mouth of the river Douro.

The Lenda de Gaia is generally seen as part of a literary tradition common to the Iberian peninsula, France and Germany inspired by the Biblical story of the marriage King Solomon and the pharaoh's daughter. It has many tropes common to folk tales, including the adulterous wife who hides her husband to meet her lover, the king who goes undercover as a beggar and the summoning of help by means of a hunting horn. Although it is not overtly political, it sends the clear message that illicit interfaith sexual liaisons have disastrous consequences. Like similar legends in Castilian and Aragonese literature, the deaths of the illicit lovers result in a positive military outcome for the Christians.

== Story ==
The simpler version of the legend is found in the Libro Velho. In it the Muslim king Abencadão kidnaps Ramiro's queen and carries her off to his castle at Gaia. Ramiro mounts a naval expedition down the Douro to rescue her. Rather than attack directly, however, he leaves his son Ordoño (the future Ordoño III) and his vassals at a distance and approaches the castle alone disguised as a beggar. Ortiga, one of the kidnapped queen's Muslim ladies-in-waiting, discovers him while fetching water and they converse in Arabic. Ortiga brings him into the castle, but the queen orders him locked in an adjacent room, intending to hand him over to her captor. Abencadão returns to the castle that evening. After supper, he has sex with the captive queen. She then reveals that her husband is in the castle, whereupon Ramiro blows the hunting horn he had brought with him to summon Ordoño and his vassals. In the ensuing battle, the Muslims are all beheaded and the castle razed.

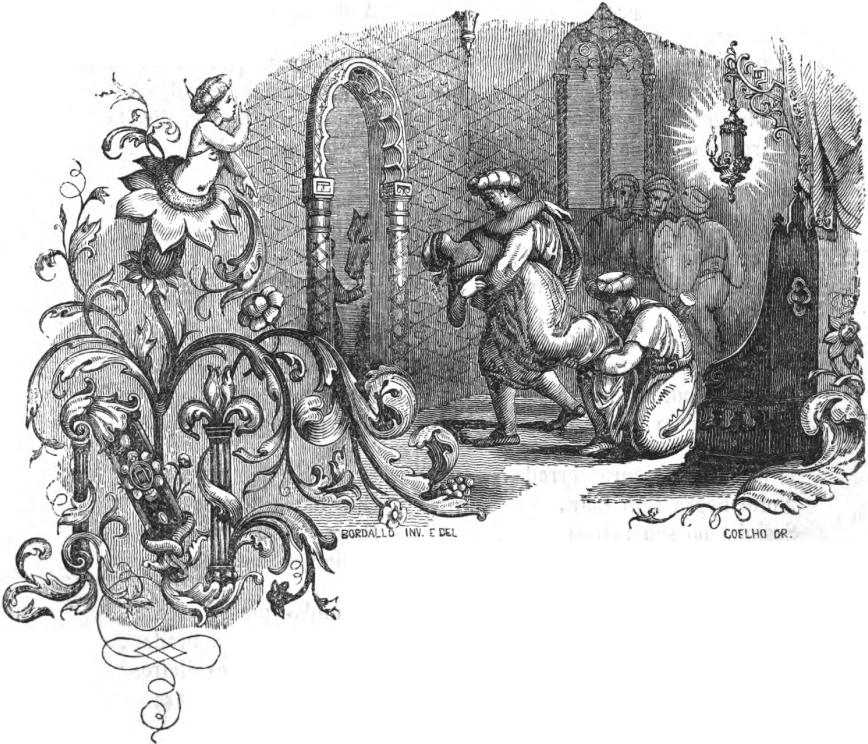
The capture of the queen, from an illustrated edition of Almeida Garrett.

The queen is rescued and her Muslim ladies-in-waiting are taken with her. On the ship home, Ramiro falls asleep with his head on his wife's lap, only to be awakened by her sobbing. She explains that she is weeping for Abencadão. An enraged Ramiro ties a millstone around her neck and thrusts her overboard, drowning her. Back at court, Ramiro has Ortiga baptized and marries her. She bears him a son, baptized Alboazar, nicknamed Cide (from Arabic sayyid, lord). He would go on to conquer many towns from the Muslims in the Reconquista. The historical Aboazar Lovesendes, ancestor of the Maia family, was not Ramiro's son. His father would have been named Leodesindo.

The Livro de Linhagens do Conde adds background to the legend. It says that Ramiro, hearing of the beauty of the sister of King Alboacer Alboçadam, declared his intention to convert and marry her. Alboacer refused his advances because his sister had already been betrothed to the king of Morocco. Ramiro then enlists the aid of a sorcerer, Aaman, to kidnap Alboacer's sister. She is taken to León, baptized and christened Artiga. In retaliation, Alboacer leads a raid to kidnaps Ramiro's queen, Aldora, and several other women. Thereafter the two accounts are essentially the same, but with the Livro de Linhagens do Conde having Ramiro marry not a rescued lady-in-waiting, but the already converted Artiga.

== Influence ==
The legend has been the inspiration and basis for many literary re-tellings. There is a poem of João Vaz (1630) that has a source other than the two genealogies. In it Ramiro captures the sister of "King" Almanzor in a war and falls in love with her. His queen, Gaya, then elopes with Almanzor. When Ramiro later visits, Gaya receives him with kindness before betraying him.

The English romantic poet Robert Southey made the version in the Livro de Linhagens do Conde the basis for his poem "King Ramiro" (1802). The Portuguese romantic João Baptista de Almeida Garrett composed a romance on the theme titled Miragaia (1844). In it the sister of Alboacer is named Zahara and Ramiro's queen is named Gaia. Ramiro beheads Gaia before throwing her body into the river.

According to the German scholar Carolina Michaëlis de Vasconcelos, a popular ballad based on the legend was still being sung as late as 1881, when she heard two lines of it.

== Sources ==
- Almeida Fernandes, Armando de [in Portuguese] (2001). Portugal primitivo medievo. Arouca: Associação da Defesa do Património Arouquense.
- Barton, Simon (2015). Conquerors, Brides and Concubines: Interfaith Relations and Social Power in Medieval Iberia. Philadelphia: University of Pennsylvania Press. ISBN 978-0-8122-4675-9.
- Blackmore, Josiah (2009). Moorings: Portuguese Expansion and the Writing of Africa. Minneapolis: University of Minnesota Press.
- Child, Francis J. (1894). The English and Scottish Popular Ballads. Boston: Houghton Mifflin. Vol. 5, Part IX.
- Foulché-Delbosc, Raymond; Krappe, Alexander (1930). "La légende du roi Ramire". Revue Hispanique. 78: 489–543.
- Ribeiro Miranda, José Carlos (1988). "A lenda de Gaia dos livros de Linhagens: uma questão de literatura?" (PDF). Revista da Faculdade de Letras: Línguas e Literaturas. Série II. 5 (2): 483–516.
- Ramos, María Ana (2004). "Hestorja dell Rej dom Ramjro de lleom...: Nova versão de A Lenda de Gaia". Critica del Testo: 791–843.
