= Marquis of Santa Iria =

- Creation date: 4 April 1833
- Created by: Maria II of Portugal (regency of Pedro IV of Portugal)
- Peerage: Kingdom of Portugal
- First holder: Dom Luís Roque de Sousa Coutinho Monteiro Paim
- Last holder: Dom Luís Roque de Sousa Coutinho Monteiro Paim (monarchy abolished)
- Present holder: José Luís de Melo de Vasconcelos e Sousa (claimant)
- Subsidiary titles: Count of Alva; Count of Magalhães; Count of Óbidos; Count of Palma; Count of Sabugal; Count of Santar; Viscount of Taveiro
- Extinction date: 1910 (monarchy abolished)

The Marquis of Santa Iria (in Portuguese: Marquês de Santa Iria) was a Portuguese title of nobility created in 1833, during the reign of Queen Maria II, for Dom Luís Roque de Sousa Coutinho Monteiro Paim, who already held the title of Count of Alva.

During the 19th and early 20th centuries, the holders of the title also came to represent, through marriage, several other noble houses, notably those of Alva, Óbidos, Palma and Sabugal.

== History ==
The title was granted on 4 April 1833 by Dom Pedro, who was acting as regent on behalf of his daughter, then a minor. The recipient was the son of the diplomat Dom Vicente Roque José de Sousa Coutinho de Meneses Monteiro Paim, 5th Lord of the entailed estate (morgado) of Alva, who represented the Portuguese Crown in Turin and in Paris, where he became ambassador, and of his second wife, Dona Luísa Inês Isabel de Montboissier Beaufort de Canillac, a native of Auvergne and daughter of the Counts of Canillac. On his father's side, he descended from Dom Rodrigo de Sousa Coutinho Castelo-Branco e Meneses, second son of the 9th Count of Redondo.

He was born in Paris on 1 February 1783, during his father's diplomatic mission, and was given an emergency baptism immediately after birth because his life was thought to be in danger. The formal ceremony took place later at Versailles, with the French king and queen, Louis XVI and Marie Antoinette, as godparents. The christening cape used at the ceremony, made of salmon-coloured silk with gold trimming, is part of the collection on display at the Casa de Santar e Magalhães.

He joined the army in 1799 as a cavalry officer. During the Peninsular War he served under Marshal Beresford, rising to the rank of colonel, and was promoted to brigadier in 1820. Removed from the military governorship of the Algarve in 1828 because of his liberal views, he went into exile and joined the liberal forces in the Azores, where he became military governor of São Miguel Island immediately after its occupation by the troops of the Count of Vila Flor, holding the post until the liberal expedition left for the mainland. He then took part in the landing at Mindelo and, during the Siege of Porto, commanded the liberal cavalry as its inspector and commander-in-chief. After the liberal victory, he served as military governor of the Algarve and of the Court and Estremadura between 1833 and 1834, and in 1836 he joined the Supreme Council of Military Justice. He had sat in the Chamber of Peers since 1826, was alcaide-mor of Rio Maior and ended his military career as a lieutenant-general. He also served as Gentleman of the Bedchamber to Queen Maria II and received several Portuguese and foreign honours, including the Grand Cross of the Order of Our Lady of the Conception of Vila Viçosa, the Order of the Tower and Sword and decorations from Belgium, Saxony and Spain. In Lisbon, the family lived in a palace on Largo de São Pedro de Alcântara.

In 1800 he married his niece, Dona Mariana Vicência de Sousa Holstein (1784–1829), who was born in Turin and died in Paris. She was the daughter of Dom Alexandre de Sousa Holstein and Dona Isabel Juliana de Sousa Coutinho Paim, and the sister of the future 1st Duke of Palmela. The couple had seven children; one of them, Dom Alexandre, an ensign in the light infantry (caçadores), was killed in action on the Lines of Lisbon in September 1833. The line of their eldest son, the 4th Count of Alva, died out in the next generation, so the headship of the family passed to the descendants of their third son, Dom Pedro de Sousa Coutinho Monteiro Paim, a first lieutenant in the Portuguese Navy. His marriage in 1839 to Dona Eugénia Maria de Assis Castelo Branco e Lancastre, 6th Countess of Óbidos and of Sabugal and 7th Countess of Palma, joined these noble inheritances to that of Santa Iria. Along with the house of Óbidos, whose title was hereditary in perpetuity (de juro e herdade) and carried the honours of a royal kinsman (honras de parente), the family also inherited the hereditary office of Chief Bailiff of the Realm (meirinho-mor do Reino).

In 1945, on the death of the last Count of Óbidos, the representation of all these houses passed to his nephew, José Luís de Vasconcelos e Sousa, the son of one of his sisters. Born in Lisbon in 1888, he was the son of Luís de Vasconcelos e Sousa, a fidalgo cavaleiro of the Royal Household, and of Dona Eugénia Maria das Dores de Melo de Assis Mascarenhas, through whose maternal ancestry he was linked to the Mascarenhas and Sousa Coutinho families.

The family archive, comprising documents dating from 1384 to 1908, was bought at public auction in 1995 and is now held by the Torre do Tombo National Archive.

The family's connection with the village of Santar, in the municipality of Nelas, dates from the marriage in 1947 of José Luís de Andrade de Vasconcelos e Sousa to Maria Teresa de Lancastre de Melo, daughter of the 3rd Viscounts of Taveiro and representative of the House of Santar and Magalhães. From 2013, their descendants developed the Santar Vila Jardim project, which linked several of the village's historic gardens and opened them to the public, following a plan by the Spanish landscape architect Fernando Caruncho.

== Marquises of Santa Iria (1833) ==
#	Holder	Dates	Titles	Notes	Ref.
1	Dom Luís Roque de Sousa Coutinho Monteiro Paim	1783–1850	1st Marquis of Santa Iria	First holder. A liberal cavalry officer, he rose to the rank of brigadier and later lieutenant-general, held military governorships in the Algarve and Lisbon, and was a member of the Chamber of Peers.	
2	José Luís de Vasconcelos e Sousa	1888–1966	2nd Marquis of Santa Iria	Great-great-grandson of the 1st Marquis through the female line, descending from his third son, Dom Pedro de Sousa Coutinho Monteiro Paim. He inherited the representation of the house on the death of his maternal uncle, the last Count of Óbidos. Born in Lisbon on 7 October 1888, he descended through his father, Luís de Vasconcelos e Sousa, from the House of Castelo Melhor; his mother was Dona Eugénia Maria das Dores de Melo de Assis Mascarenhas. He served in Mozambique during the First World War. In February 1922 he married Dona Emília van Zeller de Andrade in Lisbon, with whom he had children. He died on 6 October 1966.	

== Claimants under the Republic ==
Following the establishment of the Republic in 1910, the state stopped granting titles of nobility. Since then, the following members of the family have claimed to represent the title:

#	Name	Dates	Titles claimed	Notes	Ref.
3	José Luís de Andrade de Vasconcelos e Sousa	1924–2006	3rd Marquis of Santa Iria	Eldest son of the 2nd Marquis, born on 9 September 1924. He was a Knight of Honour and Devotion of the Sovereign Military Order of Malta. In 1947 he married Dona Maria Teresa de Lancastre de Melo in Lisbon, daughter of the 3rd Viscount of Taveiro, a marriage that linked the family to the House of Santar and Magalhães.	
4	José Luís de Melo de Vasconcelos e Sousa	b. 1959	4th Marquis of Santa Iria	Eldest son of the preceding, born in Lisbon on 14 February 1959. He graduated in economics from the University of Lausanne and headed the Edmond de Rothschild Europe bank in Portugal. Together with his brother Pedro, he founded the Santar Vila Jardim project. He chairs the supervisory board of the Friends of the Ajuda Botanical Garden (Associação dos Amigos do Jardim Botânico da Ajuda). In September 2026 he was the subject of an episode of the SIC television segment Sangue Azul (Blue Blood).	

== Family tree ==
The following family tree summarises the descent of the holders and representatives of the title, from the father of the 1st Marquis to the present day. Solid lines denote descent, and dashed lines marriage.

Dona Teresa Vital da Câmara; 1734–1753	Dom Vicente Roque de Sousa Coutinho Monteiro Paim; 1726–1792; 5th Lord of the morgado of Alva	Dona Luísa de Montboissier Beaufort de Canillac; 1754–1792
Dona Isabel Juliana de Sousa Coutinho Paim; 1753–?
Dona Mariana Vicência de Sousa Holstein; 1784–1829	Dom Luís Roque de Sousa Coutinho Monteiro Paim; 1783–1850; 1st Marquis of Santa Iria; 3rd Count of Alva
Dom Vicente de Sousa Coutinho Monteiro Paim; 1805–1841; 4th Count of Alva	Dom Alexandre de Sousa Coutinho Monteiro Paim; 1807–1833	Dom Pedro de Sousa Coutinho Monteiro Paim b. 1808	Dona Eugénia Maria de Assis Mascarenhas Castelo-Branco da Costa Lancastre; 6th Countess of Óbidos and of Sabugal; 7th Countess of Palma
Dona Mariana Eugénia de Assis Mascarenhas de Sousa Coutinho
Dona Eugénia Maria das Dores de Melo de Assis Mascarenhas; 1868–1905	Dom Pedro de Melo de Assis Mascarenhas d. 1945; Last Count of Óbidos
José Luís de Vasconcelos e Sousa; 1888–1966; 2nd Marquis of Santa Iria
José Luís de Andrade de Vasconcelos e Sousa; 1924–2006 (claimant to the title of Marquis of Santa Iria)	Maria Teresa de Lancastre de Melo; 1928–2015 (claimant to the titles of Countess of Magalhães, Countess of Santar and Viscountess of Taveiro)
Fátima de Melo de Vasconcelos e Sousa b. 1955	José Luís de Melo de Vasconcelos e Sousa b. 1959 (claimant to the title of Marquis of Santa Iria)	Pedro Paulo de Melo de Vasconcelos e Sousa b. 1965 (claimant to the title of Count of Magalhães)
Kristian Luiz Austad de Vasconcellos e Sousa b. 1992 (claimant to the titles of Count of Óbidos and Count of Sabugal)	Maria Luísa Austad de Vasconcellos e Sousa b. 1995 (claimant to the title of Viscountess of Taveiro)	Martim Luis Austad de Vasconcelos e Sousa b. 1998 (claimant to the title of Count of Palma)
