= Count of Magalhães =

- Coronet of a Portuguese count
- Creation date: 13 May 1854 (barony); 24 May 1870 (elevation to countship)
- Created by: Ferdinand II of Portugal (as regent); Luís I of Portugal
- First holder: António Joaquim Vieira de Magalhães
- Last holder: António Joaquim Vieira de Magalhães (monarchy abolished)
- Present holder: Pedro Paulo de Melo de Vasconcelos e Sousa (claimant)
- Remainder to: For one life, with honours of Grandeza
- Subsidiary titles: Baron of Magalhães
- Extinction date: 1910 (monarchy abolished)

The Count of Magalhães (in Portuguese: Conde de Magalhães) was a Portuguese title of nobility, created by King Luís I by decree of 24 May 1870 in favour of António Joaquim Vieira de Magalhães, previously Baron of Magalhães, a title he had received in 1854. Both titles were granted for life, so each had only one holder under the monarchy.

== History ==
António Joaquim Vieira de Magalhães was born in Porto on 22 June 1822 and died in Cascais on 9 September 1903. He was a son of the first marriage of the 1st Baron and 1st Viscount of Alpendurada.

He settled in Lisbon and worked as a merchant, becoming one of the city's leading traders. He began his political career as an associate of the Count of Peniche, later Marquis of Angeja, whom he consistently supported in his various conspiracies. After the military coup led by the Duke of Saldanha on 19 May 1870, he joined the government and was appointed Minister of Finance on 4 July that year, in the cabinet known as the "Ministry of the Hundred Days". He later joined the dissident faction led by Vaz Preto. He was elected a Peer of the Realm on 29 December 1892 and later retired from politics. He also held the title of honorary Minister of State. He received the Grand Cross of the Order of Our Lady of the Conception of Vila Viçosa and the Grand Cross of the Spanish Order of Charles III.

On 29 July 1857 he married Dona Antónia Maria de Orta, daughter of the 1st Viscounts of Orta, with whom he had two daughters: Dona Margarida, who became Countess of Santar through her marriage to the 1st Count of Santar and Viscount of Taveiro; and Dona Maria Antónia, who married the Count of Santa Cruz de los Manueles, Grandee of Spain and Marquis of Lierta.

He was made a baron for life by decree of 13 May 1854, issued by Ferdinand II as regent during the minority of Peter V. A decree of King Luís I of 24 May 1870 made him a Grandee of the Realm with the title of count. He used the arms of the Counts of Alpendurada.

== Barons of Magalhães (1854) ==
No.	Holder	Dates	Titles	Notes	Refs
1	António Joaquim Vieira de Magalhães	1822–1903	1st Baron of Magalhães	Title granted for life by decree of 13 May 1854 by Ferdinand II, regent during the minority of Peter V. Raised to count in 1870.	

== Counts of Magalhães (1870) ==
No.	Holder	Dates	Titles	Notes	Refs
1	António Joaquim Vieira de Magalhães	1822–1903	1st Count of Magalhães	Title granted for life, with Grandeeship, by decree of 24 May 1870 by Luís I. Only holder under the monarchy.	

== Claimants under the Republic ==
Following the establishment of the Republic in 1910, the state stopped granting titles of nobility. Since then, the following members of the family have claimed to represent the title:

No.	Name	Dates	Titles claimed	Notes	Refs
2	Maria Teresa de Lancastre de Melo	1928–2015	2nd Countess of Magalhães (3rd Countess of Santar and 4th Viscountess of Taveiro)	Born on 7 December 1928, she ran the House of Santar during the second half of the 20th century. In 1947, in Lisbon, she married José Luís de Andrade de Vasconcelos e Sousa, claimant to the title of Marquis of Santa Iria, linking the House of Santar and Magalhães to the Vasconcelos e Sousa family.	
3	Pedro Paulo de Melo de Vasconcelos e Sousa	b. 1965	3rd Count of Magalhães	Son of the preceding. An oenologist, he runs the projects of the House of Santar and Magalhães with his brother, José Luís de Melo de Vasconcelos e Sousa, claimant to the title of Marquis of Santa Iria. These include Santar Vila Jardim, which won a European Garden Award in 2021. He also led the development of the Herdade do Freixo wine estate in Redondo. In September 2026 he was the subject of the SIC television segment Sangue Azul (Blue Blood).	
