= Fernão Álvares da Maia =

Portuguese nobleman (1390–1449

- Lord
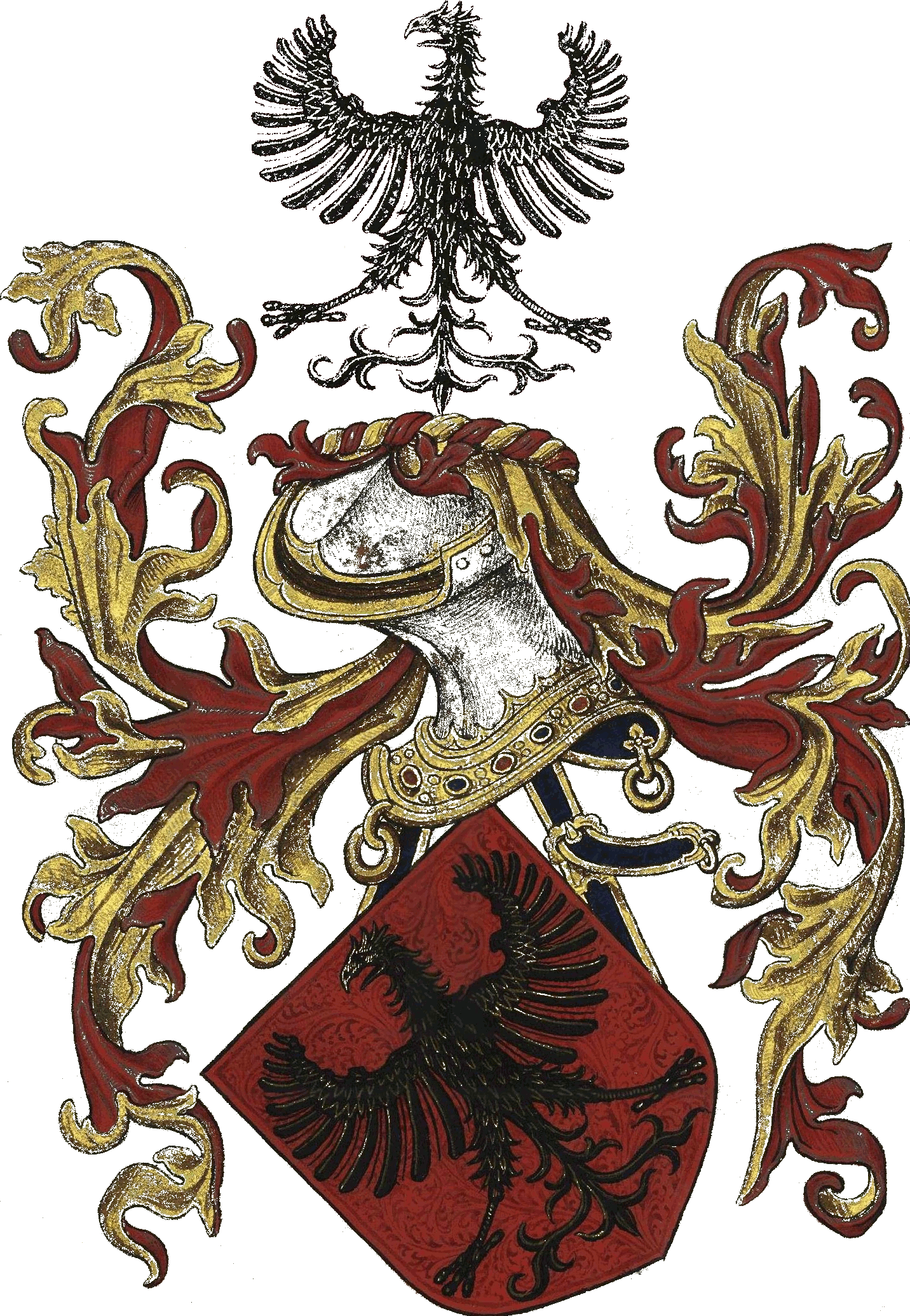
- Coat of Arms of Maia
- Born: c.1390 Vila Franca de Xira, Kingdom of Portugal
- Died: 20 May 1449; Battle of Alfarrobeira, Kingdom of Portugal
- Noble family: House of Maia
- Occupation: Military

Fernão Álvares da Maia (c. 1390 – 1449) was a Portuguese nobleman, Lord of Pena, Aguiar and Trofa.

== Biography ==
Fernão was born in Lisbon, Kingdom of Portugal, son of Álvaro Gonçalves da Maia. He was married to Guiomar de Sá, daughter of Gonçalo de Sá (Lord of Aguiar) and Isabel Gil de Magalhães. The Sá family were descendant of Giacomo Sciarra della Colonna (senator of Rome), member of the prestigious Colonna family.

Supporter of the cause of Peter, Duke of Coimbra, Fernão Álvares da Maia went towards Lisbon, where participated in the Battle of Alfarrobeira. Maia died in combat on 20 May 1449.
