= Aboazar Lovesendes =

- Knight
- Born: 10th-century Iberian Peninsula
- Died: 10th-century Iberian Peninsula
- Noble family: House of Maia
- Spouse: Unisco Godins
- Issue: Trastamiro Aboazar, Ermígio Aboazar, Cid Aboazar, Lovesendo Aboazar, Ausenda Aboazar,
- Father: Lovesendo

Aboazar Lovesendes (died after 978) was a lord (domno) in the County of Portugal in the Kingdom of León in the middle decades of the tenth century. He is the ancestor of the lords of Maia.

Aboazar's parentage is the subject of a traditional heroic tale, the Miragaia. The legend makes him progeny of the romantic liaison between Ramiro II of León and Ortiga/Artiga, the beautiful sister of a powerful local Muslim lord, Alboaçar Abençadan Çada, a great-grandson of 'king Abdullah'. Depending on the version of the legend, this was either in revenge for, or provided the motivation for, a parallel liaison between Abençadan and Ramiro's wife, Aldora, for which Ramiro murders his wife and marries Ortiga, having a son Aboazar.

This tale is at odds with the known marital history of Ramiro, as well as with the patronymic of the Portuguese lord. Though sources derived from the Miragaia call him Aboazar Ramírez to reflect the paternity given him there, he appears in contemporary records as Abonazar Lovesendes, indicating his actual father's name was Lovesendo (probably representing the Visigothic name Leodesindo). According to the legend in its late medieval form, he was nicknamed Cide (from Arabic sayyid, lord), a common nickname in the tenth century and one he may actually have borne.

== Descendants ==
Aboazar married Unisco Godins, founder of Santo Tirso Monastery, by whom he had the following children:

- Trastamiro Aboazar, married to Dórdia Soares;
- Ermígio Aboazar, married to Vivilide Trutesendes;
- Cid Aboazar;
- Lovesendo Aboazar, documented in 999, married a daughter of Egica Honoriques;
- Ausenda Aboazar, probably married to Piniolo.

On 9 June 1092, the heirs of Aboazar's children executed an agreement in favor of the Monastery of Santo Tirso promising that they and their descendants would continue to be its patrons, that they would not sell, donate or bequeath the monastery and that it would always be governed by its abbots under the Rule of Saint Benedict.

== Bibliography ==
- Almeida Fernandes, Armando de [in Portuguese] (2001). Portugal primitivo medievo. Arouca: Associação da Defesa do Património Arouquense.
- Carvalho Correia, Francisco (2008). O Mosteiro de Santo Tirso de 978 a 1588: a silhueta de uma entidade projectada no chao de uma história milenária (in Portuguese) (1st ed.). Santiago de Compostela: Universidade de Santiago de Compostela: Servizo de Publicacións e Intercambio Científico. ISBN 978-84-9887-038-1.
- Mattoso, José (1981). A nobreza medieval portuguesa: a família e o poder (in Portuguese). Lisbon: Editorial Estampa. OCLC 8242615.
