= House of Maia =

Portuguese noble family

Lords of Maia
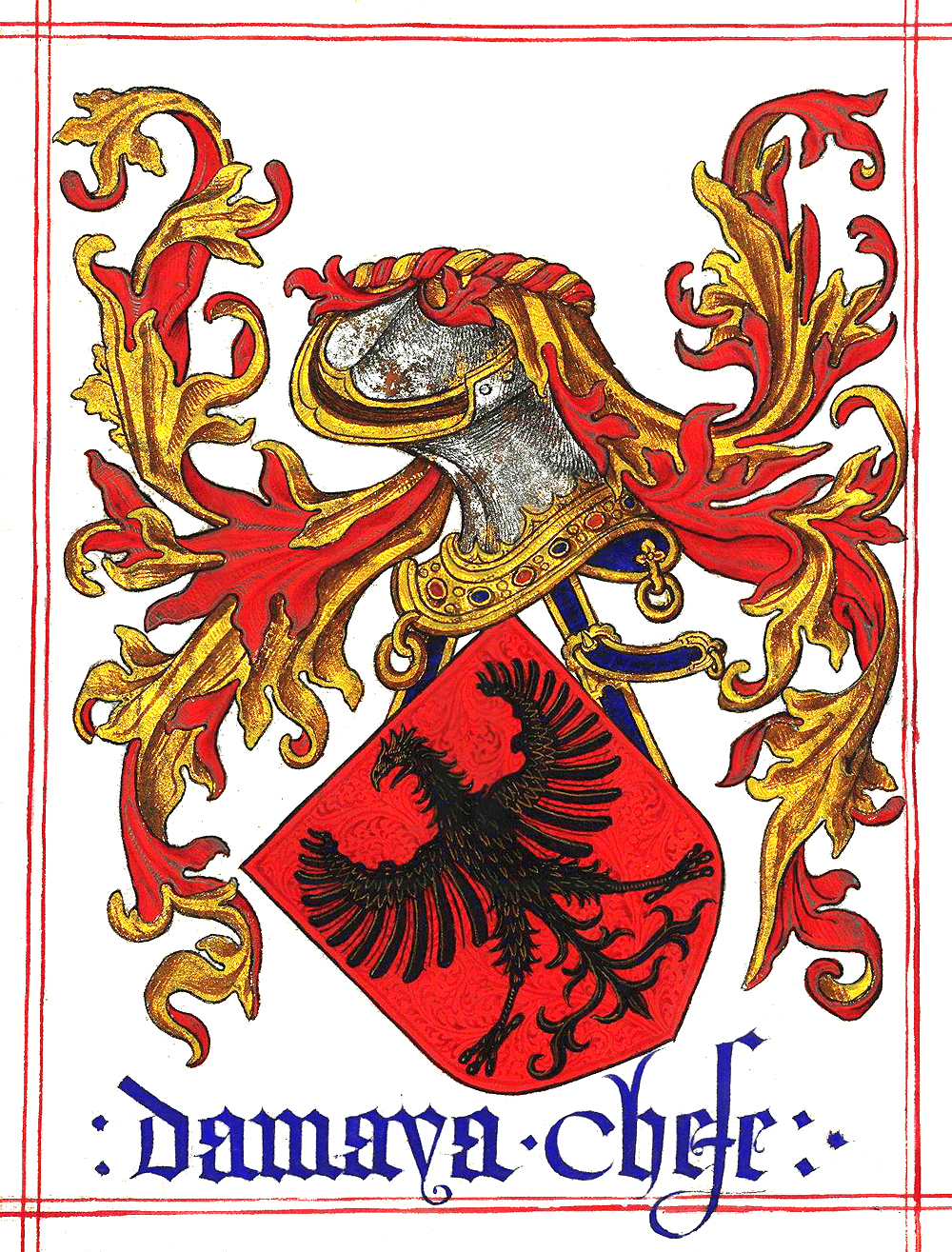
- Creation date: 978 AD
- Created by: D. Afonso Henriques
- Peerage: Peerage of Portugal
- First holder: Trastamiro Aboazar
- Remainder to: semi-salic law

The Maia family was an old and powerful Portuguese noble family with its origins dating back to the 10th century.

== Year 960 to 1129 ==
Lords of Maia before the creation of the Kingdom of Portugal

- (965– ) Trastamiro Aboazar – 1st Lord of Maia, son of Aboazar Lovesendes
- (1000–1039) Gonçalo Trastemires – 2nd Lord of Maia
- (1020–1065) Mendo Gonçalves da Maia – 3rd Lord of Maia
- (1060–1103) Dom Soeiro Mendes da Maia
- (1094–1129) Dom Paio Soares.

== 1129 to 1350 ==
Lords of Maia

- (c. 1125–c.1170) Dom Pedro Paes da Maia
- (c. 1170–c. 1220) Dom Martinho Pires da Maia
- (c. 1220–1290) Fernão Martins da Maia
- (1270–1330) Monio Fernandes da Maia
- (c. 1300–1360) Martim Moniz da Maia

== 1350 to 1500 ==
Lords of Trofa

- (c. 1350–1434) Martim da Maia. He was married to Ana Afonso de Lançós, daughter of Dona Florência Antónia de Lanços and Dom Richard of Teyve, who was son of Dom Richarte (French noble) grandson of Lord Richard of Cornwall, Earl of Cornwall and great-grandson of King John of England
- (c. 1380–1449) Álvaro Gonçalves da Maia
- (c. 1410–1476) Fernão Álvares da Maia
- (c. 1450–1500) João Gonçalves da Maia

== 1500 to 1690 ==
Family in Guimarães

- (c. 1470–1520) Martim Vasques da Maia
- (1492–1548) Fernão Ferreira da Maia
- (1520–1580) D. Senhorinha Fernandes Ferreira da Maia
- (1540–1586) Manuel Álvares da Maia
- (1580–1640) D. Ana Manuel da Maia
- (c. 1600–1656) D. Francisca Dias Ferreira da Maia
- (1630–1690) D. Maria Ferreira da Maia
- (1670–1720) D. Ana Rodrigues Ferreira da Maia

== Bibliology ==
- D. António Caetano de Sousa, História Genealógica da Casa Real Portuguesa, Atlântida-Livraria Editora, Lda, 2ª Edição, Coimbra, 1946.
- Fernandes, A. de Almeida (1960). A ação das linhagens no repovoamento. Porto: [s.n.]
- Mattoso, José (1994). A Nobreza Medieval Portuguesa - A Família e o Poder. Lisboa: Editorial Estampa. ISBN 972-33-0993-9
- Mattoso, José (1985). Identificação de um País. I. Lisboa: Editorial Estampa
- Manuel José da Costa Felgueiras Gayo, Nobiliário das Famílias de Portugal, Carvalhos de Basto, 2ª Edição, Braga, 1989.
- Sotto Mayor Pizarro, José Augusto (1997). Linhagens Medievais Portuguesas: Genealogias e Estratégias (1279-1325). I. Porto: Tese de Doutoramento, Edicão do Autor
- Ventura, Leontina (1992). A nobreza de corte de Afonso III. II. Porto: Tese de Doutoramento, Edicão do Autor
- Francisco Antônio Dória, A Semente, ISBN 9781257948109, Edições Jardim da Casa.
