= Álvaro Gonçalves da Maia =

Portuguese nobleman

- Lord
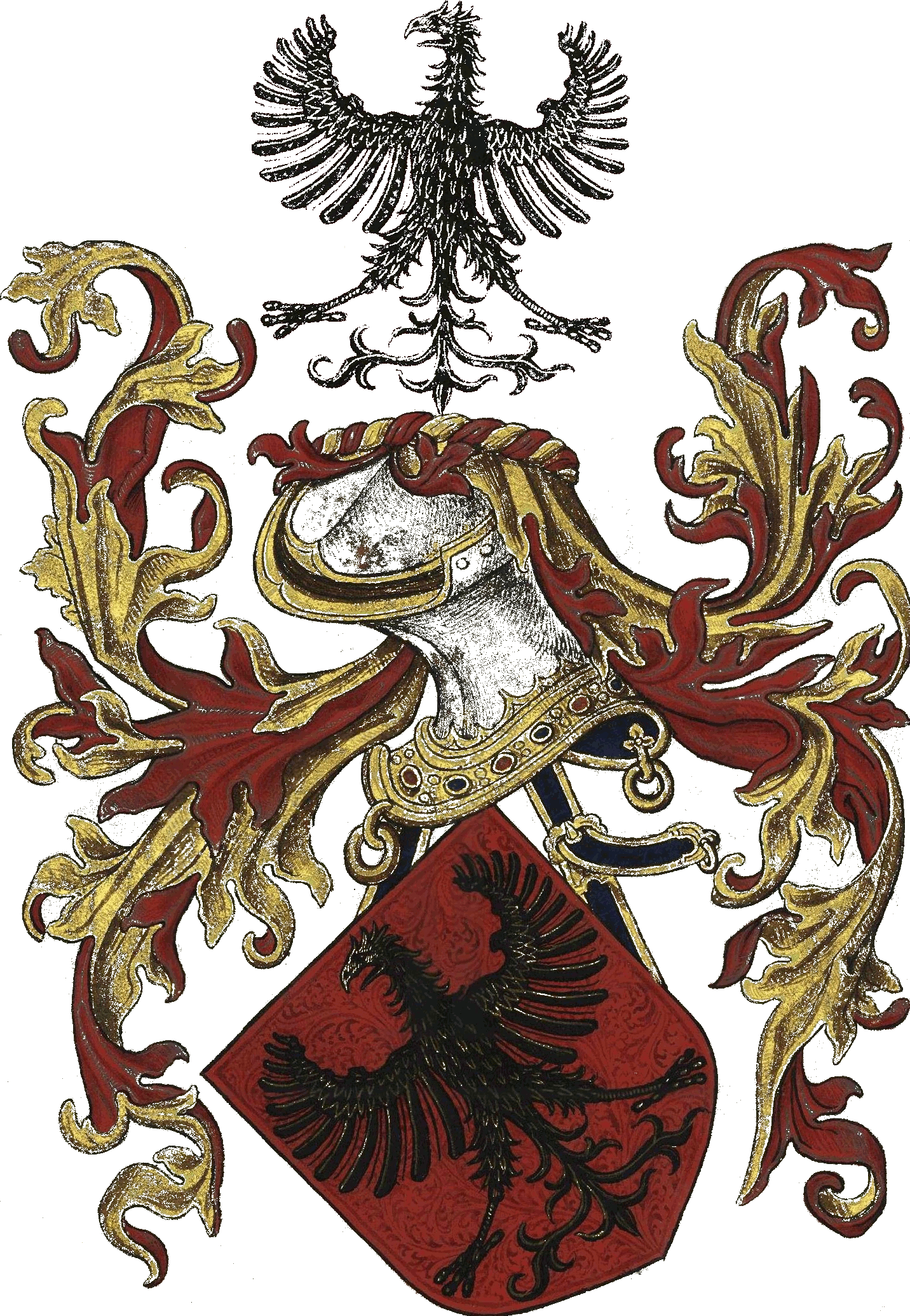
- Coat of Arms of Maia
- Born: 14th Century; Portugal
- Died: 15th Century; Portugal
- Noble family: House of Maia

Álvaro Gonçalves da Maia (c.1370–1449) was a Portuguese nobleman, member of the Court of John I of Portugal. He served as Ambassador in Aragon.

His parents were Martim da Maia and Ana Afonso de Lanços, daughter of Florência Antónia de Lanços and Richard of Teyve, grandson of Richard, 1st Earl of Cornwall.
