= Martim da Maia =

Portuguese nobleman

- Lord
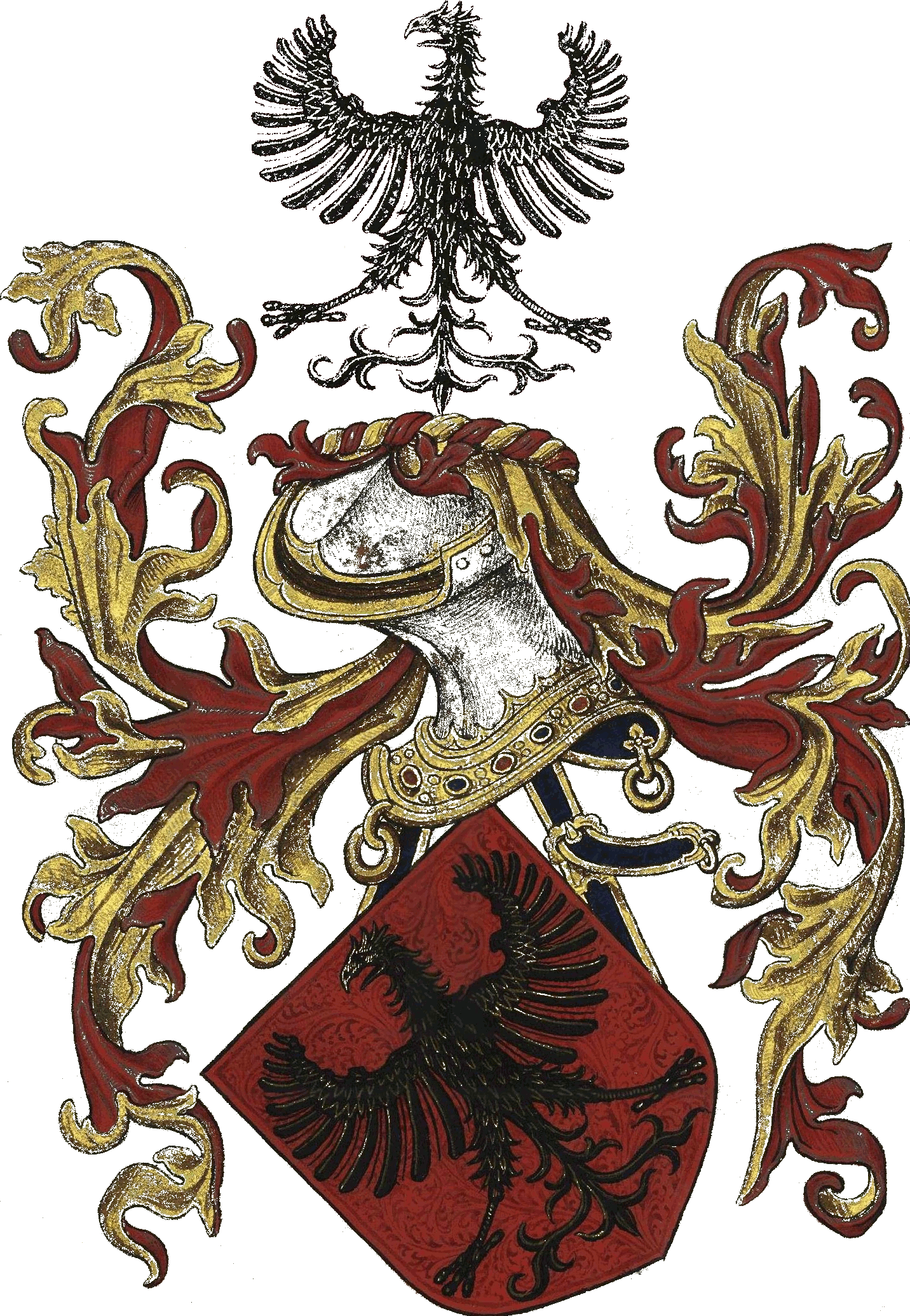
- Coat of Arms of Maia
- Born: 1350; Portugal
- Died: 1434 (aged 83–84); Portugal
- Noble family: House of Maia

Martim da Maia (1350–1434) was a Portuguese nobleman, 1st Lord of Trofa in the Kingdom of Portugal.

== Biography ==
His wife was Ana de Lançós, daughter of Florença de Lançós and Richarte de Teive, a French nobleman, descendant of John, King of England).

Martim da Maia was a direct descendant of Trastamiro Aboazar (Portuguese nobleman), 1st Lord of Maia. And of Egas Moniz belonging to the Court of Afonso I of Portugal.
