= Count of Melo =

- Coronet of a Portuguese count
- Creation date: 24 January 1835; 21 April 1866 (renewal)
- Created by: Maria II of Portugal; Luís I of Portugal (renewal)
- First holder: Luís Francisco Estêvão Soares de Melo da Silva Breyner
- Last holder: Dona Teresa Francisca de Melo Breyner Sousa Tavares e Moura (monarchy abolished)
- Present holder: Teresa Margarida Gomez de Sousa Botelho de Albuquerque (claimant)
- Remainder to: For one life; renewed once
- Extinction date: 1910 (monarchy abolished)

The Count of Melo (in portuguese: Conde de Melo) was a Portuguese title of nobility, created by Queen Maria II by decree of 24 January 1835 in favour of Luís Francisco Estêvão Soares de Melo da Silva Breyner, 19th Lord of Melo. The title was renewed by King Luís by decree of 21 April 1866 in favour of the first holder's daughter, Dona Teresa Francisca de Melo Breyner Sousa Tavares e Moura.

== History ==
The title was conferred upon the representative of the house of the Lords of Melo, whose lordship dates from the Middle Ages. Luís Francisco Soares de Melo da Silva Breyner Sousa Tavares e Moura was born in Porto in 1801 and died on 13 November 1865. He was the son of the diplomat and Minister of State Pedro de Melo Breyner, Lord of Trofa, and of Dona Ana Rufina Soares de Melo Sousa Tavares e Moura, 18th Lady of Melo, whom he succeeded at the head of the house in 1821.

An officer of cavalry, he served in Brazil and accompanied his father on the latter's diplomatic missions to Rome and Paris. An adherent of the Liberal cause, he joined the Liberal forces on Terceira Island after his father had been imprisoned by the government of Dom Miguel. During the Portuguese Civil War, he took part in the Landing of Mindelo, distinguished himself at the Siege of Porto and in the actions at Leiria and Torres Novas, and was made an Officer of the Order of the Tower and Sword. During the Patuleia (1846–1847), he commanded the forces of the Alentejo in the service of the Junta of Porto. He concluded his career as a member of the Supreme Council of Military Justice, and was promoted to the rank of general of division shortly before his death.

He was appointed a Peer of the Realm by royal letter of 1 October 1835, and presided over the Municipal Chamber of Lisbon in 1840. He was a Commander of the Orders of Christ and of Saint Benedict of Aviz, and a Knight of the Order of Our Lady of the Conception of Vila Viçosa. He was furthermore a member of the Academy of Saint Luke in Rome and Vice-Inspector of the Academy of Fine Arts of Lisbon.

On 15 February 1835 he married Dona Frederica Xavier Botelho, daughter of Sebastião Xavier Botelho, of the house of the Counts of São Miguel. Of this marriage were born Pedro Francisco, who died in infancy; Dona Teresa Francisca, 2nd Countess of Melo; and Dona Ana, Countess of Sabugal. The family resided at the Cova da Moura Palace in Lisbon.

Upon the death of the 1st Count, the title was renewed in favour of his daughter and heiress, Dona Teresa Francisca de Melo da Silva Breyner Sousa Tavares e Moura, who was born on 8 April 1848 and died on 11 March 1926. On 2 March 1867 she married Dom José Luís de Sousa Botelho Mourão e Vasconcelos, 3rd Count of Vila Real, honorary Officer-Major of the Royal Household and Lord of the entailed estates (morgados) of Mateus and Cumieira, who had been born on 23 September 1843. By virtue of this marriage, the House of Melo was merged into that of the Counts of Vila Real, and the representation of the title passed to the line of Sousa Botelho.

== Arms ==
The arms of the Counts of Melo are those of the family of Melo, borne undifferenced, ensigned with a count's coronet and bearing the crest of Melo.

== Counts of Melo (1835) ==
#	Holder	Dates	Titles	Notes	Ref.
1	Luís Francisco Estêvão Soares de Melo da Silva Breyner	1801–1865	1st Count of Melo	Title created by decree of 24 January 1835 (Maria II).	
2	Teresa Francisca de Melo Breyner Sousa Tavares e Moura	1848–1926	2nd Countess of Melo (Countess of Vila Real, by marriage)	Daughter and heiress of the 1st Count. Title renewed by decree of 21 April 1866 (Luís I).	

== Claimants under the Republic ==
Following the establishment of the Republic in 1910, the state ceased to confer titles of nobility. Since that time, the following members of the family have claimed the representation of the title:

#	Name	Dates	Titles claimed	Notes	Ref.
3	Maria Teresa de Sousa Botelho de Melo	1871–1947	3rd Countess of Melo	Daughter of the 2nd Countess; succeeded upon the death of her brother, Dom Fernando, who left no legitimate issue. Married Fernando de Almeida Cardoso de Albuquerque, 2nd Count of Mangualde. Had issue.	
4	Francisco de Sousa Botelho de Albuquerque	1909–1973	4th Count of Melo	Son of the preceding. Founder of the Casa de Mateus Foundation (1970).	
5	Fernando de Sousa Botelho de Albuquerque	1941–2022	5th Count of Melo	Son of the preceding. Delegate Director of the Casa de Mateus Foundation (1973–2022).	
6	Teresa Margarida Gomez de Sousa Botelho de Albuquerque	b. 1966	6th Countess of Melo	Daughter of the preceding. Delegate Director of the Casa de Mateus Foundation since 2022.	
