= Count of Alva =

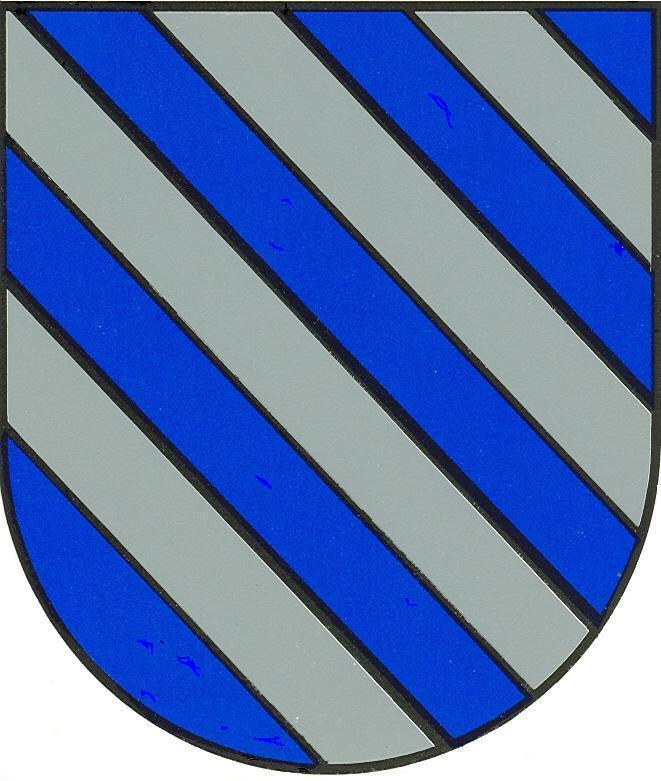
- Creation date: 29 April 1729
- Created by: John V of Portugal
- First holder: Dom João Diogo de Sousa e Ataíde
- Last holder: Dom Vicente de Sousa Coutinho Monteiro Paim (monarchy abolished)
- Present holder: José Luís de Melo de Vasconcelos e Sousa (claimant)
- Remainder to: With honours of Grandeza
- Extinction date: 1910 (monarchy abolished)

The Count of Alva (in Portuguese: Conde de Alva) was a Portuguese title of nobility created by decree of King John V of 29 April 1729 for Dom João Diogo de Sousa e Ataíde, second son of the 6th Counts of Atouguia.

From the outset, the title was linked to the House of the Lords of the entailed estate (morgado) of Alva, of which the first holder's wife was the heiress. When the 1st Count's line died out, the title was granted to a relative, Dom Luís Mascarenhas, who did not inherit the entailed estate. It later returned to the line that had inherited the House of Alva, the Sousa Coutinho Monteiro Paim family, whose head was made Marquis of Santa Iria in 1833.

== History ==
The 1st Count, Dom João Diogo de Sousa e Ataíde (1663–1740), was a member of the Council of War and a lieutenant-general. He served as military governor of Minho and the Alentejo, and fought in the War of the Spanish Succession. He married Dona Constança Luísa Monteiro Paim, eldest daughter of Roque Monteiro Paim, Secretary of State to Peter II, and 3rd Lady of the entailed estate of Alva, with which the title became associated.

As the marriage produced no children, the entailed estate of Alva passed to the Countess's sister, Dona Maria Antónia de São Boaventura de Meneses Paim, wife of Dom Rodrigo de Sousa Coutinho, and then to their son, Dom Vicente Roque José de Sousa Coutinho Monteiro Paim (1726–1792), father of the future 3rd Count.

The title, which had fallen vacant, was granted by King Joseph I, by decree of 13 March and letters patent of 24 March 1754, to Dom Luís Mascarenhas, fourth son of the 2nd Marquis of Fronteira and maternal grandson of the 7th Counts of Atouguia. He did not inherit the entailed estate. A former governor of the Captaincy of São Paulo (1739–1748), he received the title before leaving for India as the 46th viceroy, and died on campaign on 28 June 1756 during the march on Ponda.

In June 1797, during the regency of Prince Dom João, the title was renewed for Dom Luís Roque de Sousa Coutinho Monteiro Paim (1783–1850), great-nephew of the 1st Count and Countess, thereby reuniting it with the House of Alva. A lieutenant-general and Peer of the Realm, he was made Marquis of Santa Iria by decree of 4 April 1833, during the regency of Pedro IV.

The 4th and last holder was his eldest son, Dom Vicente de Sousa Coutinho Monteiro Paim (1805–1868). The title was granted to him in recognition of his father's services by decree of John VI of 22 June 1815, and the letters patent were issued on 23 April 1823.

== Arms ==
The Counts of Alva of the Sousa Coutinho Monteiro Paim line bore a shield divided per pale. The first half is quartered with the arms of Paim and Monteiro, and the second bears the arms of the Sousas of Prado, which were adopted by the Sousa Coutinhos. The crest is that of Paim, and the coronet is that of a count.

== Counts of Alva (1729) ==
#	Holder	Dates	Titles	Notes	Ref.
1	Dom João Diogo de Sousa e Ataíde	31 October 1663 – 11 April 1740	1st Count of Alva	First holder, created count by decree of 29 April 1729 by John V. Second son of the 6th Counts of Atouguia; member of the Council of War and lieutenant-general. He married Dona Constança Luísa Monteiro Paim, 3rd Lady of the entailed estate of Alva, and had no children.	
2	Dom Luís Mascarenhas	d. 28 June 1756	2nd Count of Alva	A relative of the 1st Count: son of the 2nd Marquises of Fronteira and maternal grandson of the 7th Counts of Atouguia. He received the vacant title by decree of 13 March and letters patent of 24 March 1754 from Joseph I, without inheriting the entailed estate of Alva. Governor of the Captaincy of São Paulo and 46th Viceroy of India, where he died on campaign. He married Dona Maria Bárbara de Meneses, daughter of the 2nd Counts of Santiago de Beduído.	
3	Dom Luís Roque de Sousa Coutinho Monteiro Paim	1 February 1783 – 5 April 1850	3rd Count of Alva (1st Marquis of Santa Iria)	Great-nephew of the 1st Count through the 1st Countess, whose sister had inherited the entailed estate of Alva. The title was renewed for him in June 1797, during the regency of Prince Dom João, and he was made Marquis of Santa Iria in 1833. Lieutenant-general and Peer of the Realm. He married his niece, Dona Mariana Vicência de Sousa Holstein, and had children.	
4	Dom Vicente de Sousa Coutinho Monteiro Paim	7 April 1805 – 11 September 1868	4th Count of Alva	Son of the preceding. The title was granted to him by decree of 22 June 1815 by John VI, with letters patent of 23 April 1823. Diplomat and hereditary Peer of the Realm. In 1826 he married Dona Leonor Juliana Luísa de Mascarenhas, daughter of the 6th Marquises of Fronteira; their only son, Dom Luís de Sousa, did not use the title and died unmarried.	

== Claimants under the Republic ==
Following the establishment of the Republic in 1910, the state stopped granting titles of nobility. Since then, the following members of the family have claimed to represent the title:

#	Name	Dates	Titles claimed	Notes	Ref.
5	José Luís Andrade de Vasconcelos e Sousa	1924–2006	5th Count of Alva	A descendant of Dom Pedro de Sousa, brother of the 4th Count, in whose line the representation of the title fell; eldest son of the 2nd Marquis of Santa Iria. Knight of Honour and Devotion of the Sovereign Military Order of Malta. In 1947 he married Dona Maria Teresa de Lancastre de Melo, daughter of the 3rd Viscount of Taveiro, which linked the family to the House of Santar and Magalhães.	
6	José Luís de Melo de Vasconcelos e Sousa	b. 1959	6th Count of Alva	Eldest son of the preceding. An economist who graduated from the University of Lausanne, he headed the Edmond de Rothschild Europe bank in Portugal. With his brother Pedro, he founded the Santar Vila Jardim project, and he chairs the supervisory board of the Friends of the Ajuda Botanical Garden (Associação dos Amigos do Jardim Botânico da Ajuda). In 2026 he was the subject of an episode of the SIC segment Sangue Azul (Blue Blood).	
