= Trastamiro Aboazar =

Portuguese knight born c. 980

- Lord
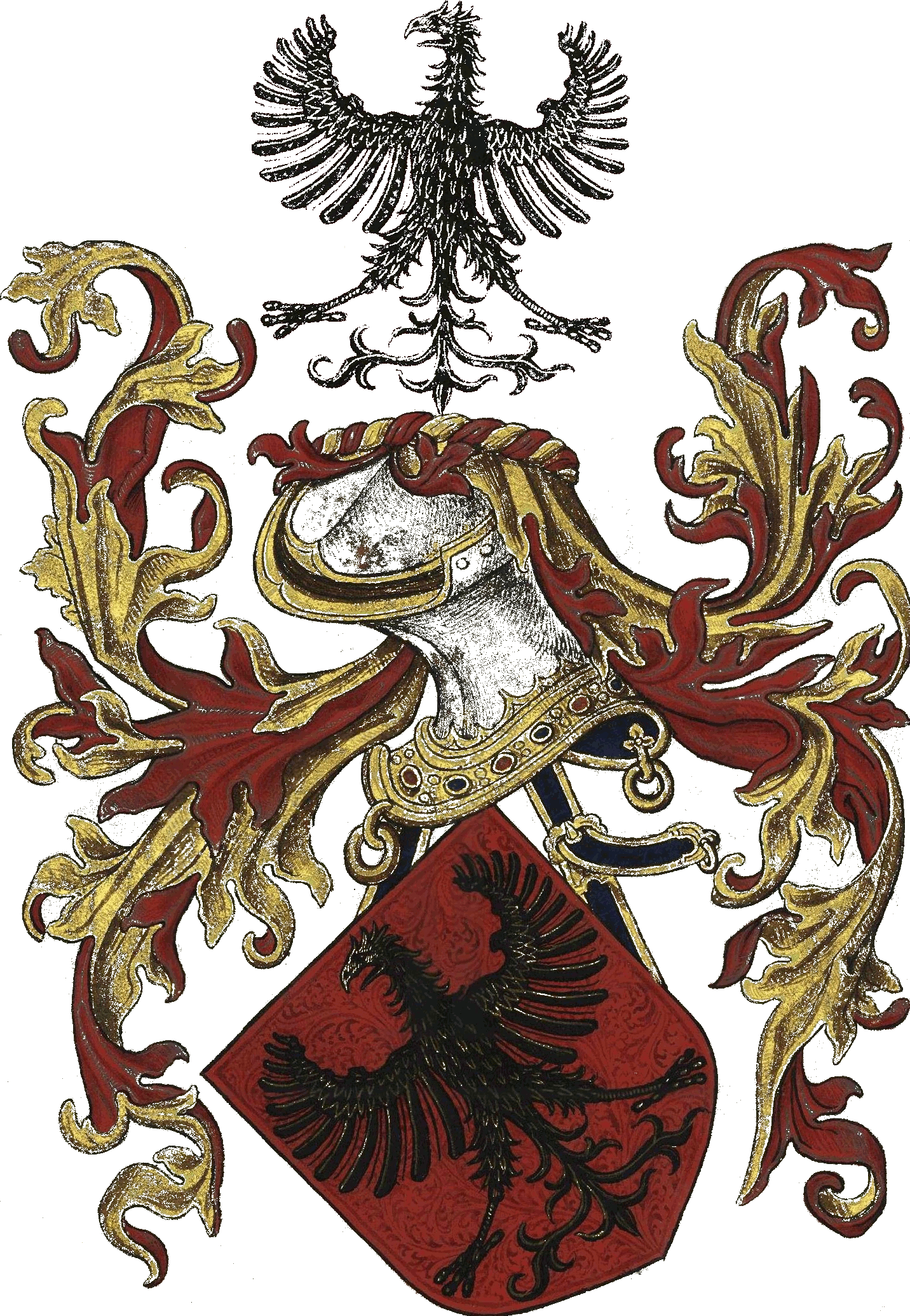
- Coat of Arms of Maia
- Born: 10th-century County of Portugal
- Died: 11th-century County of Portugal
- Noble family: House of Maia
- Spouse: Dordia Soares
- Issue: Gonçalo Trastamires
- Father: Aboazar Lovesendes
- Mother: Unisco Godinhes

Trastamiro Aboazar (c. 980–?) was a medieval Portuguese knight, considered to have been the first Lord of Maia.

== Personal life ==
Trastamiro was the son of Aboazar Lovesendes and Unisco Godinhes. Aboazar was married to Dórdia Soares, of Asturian origin, and had a son:

- Gonçalo Trastamires, 2nd Lord of Maia (d. 1039), who married Unisco Sisnandez, daughter of the Mozarabic knight Sisnando Davides, governor and consul of Coimbra.
