= Viscount of Taveiro =

- Coronet of a Portuguese viscount
- Creation date: 26 February 1851
- Created by: Maria II of Portugal
- First holder: Dona Maria Rosa de Figueiredo da Cunha d'Eça Abreu e Melo Pereira de Lacerda e Lemos
- Last holder: José Pedro Paulo de Melo de Figueiredo Pais do Amaral (monarchy abolished)
- Present holder: Maria Luísa Austad de Vasconcellos e Sousa (claimant)
- Remainder to: For two lives
- Extinction date: 1910 (monarchy abolished)

Dona Maria Rosa de Figueiredo da Cunha d'Eça Abreu e Melo Pereira de Lacerda e Lemos, 1st Viscountess of Taveiro (1832–1882)

The Viscount of Taveiro (in Portuguese: Visconde de Taveiro) was a Portuguese title of nobility created by Queen Maria II by decree of 26 February 1851. Granted for two lives, it was conferred on Dona Maria Rosa de Figueiredo da Cunha d'Eça Abreu e Melo Pereira de Lacerda e Lemos, and her husband, José de Melo Pais do Amaral de Sousa Pereira de Vasconcelos e Meneses, was also authorised to use it.

The title takes its name from Taveiro, a village in the municipality of Coimbra. From the second life onwards, its history became intertwined with that of the family of the Counts of Santar.

== History ==
=== Family origins ===
Dona Maria Rosa was born on 2 April 1832. Heiress to the entailed estate (morgado) of Taveiro, of which she was the seventh administrator, she was also the sixteenth representative of the branch of the Melo e Cunha family established in São Pedro do Sul. Genealogists trace this line back to Pedro Gomes de Abreu, the son of Dona Brites d'Eça and Dom João Gomes de Abreu, born before the latter became Bishop of Viseu and later legitimised by Afonso V. Pedro Gomes de Abreu's wife, Dona Mécia da Cunha, was an ancestor of the future Viscountess ten generations back.

On 6 September 1800, Dona Maria Rosa's paternal grandfather, António de Figueiredo da Cunha e Melo, fifth administrator of the entailed estate of Taveiro, received a grant of arms. He was succeeded as administrator by his son, José de Figueiredo da Cunha e Melo, who served as juiz de fora (crown judge) in Évora with the powers of a corregedor, and was a fidalgo cavaleiro of the Royal Household and a Knight of the Order of Christ. On 26 June 1831 he married Dona Maria do Cardal Pereira Ramos de Lacerda e Lemos, from Condeixa, a niece on her mother's side of the 1st Viscount of Juromenha. Dona Maria Rosa was born of this marriage.

=== Grant and succession ===
The title was granted through the intervention of the recipient's uncle, Dom Pedro Paulo de Figueiredo da Cunha e Melo, Cardinal and Archbishop of Braga and a native of Taveiro, whose services to the Crown the Queen wished to reward. In a royal notice (aviso régio) of 28 February 1851, the Count of Tomar informed the prelate of the Queen's decision, explaining that his niece's husband could also style himself viscount once the title had been registered at the Secretariat of State for Home Affairs.

Dona Maria Rosa had married on 26 November 1849. Her husband, José de Melo Pais do Amaral de Sousa Pereira de Vasconcelos e Meneses, a fidalgo of the Royal Household, was the seventh lord of the entailed estates of Santar and Corga and the fourth holder of the leasehold (prazo) of São João de Lourosa. His father, José de Melo Pais do Amaral, also a fidalgo of the Royal Household, had brought together several entailed estates and had been capitão-mor of Senhorim and Canas de Senhorim. Because he was authorised to use his wife's title, some works also count him as 1st Viscount of Taveiro. Dona Maria Rosa died on 9 April 1882.

A decree of Luís I dated 11 July 1878 renewed the title for its second life in favour of the couple's eldest son, José Pedro Paulo de Melo de Figueiredo Pais do Amaral da Cunha Eça Abreu e Sousa de Meneses Pereira de Lacerda Lemos e Vasconcelos. Born on 22 December 1853 and a fidalgo of the Royal Household, he married Dona Margarida Vieira de Magalhães, daughter of the Counts of Magalhães, in Lisbon on 10 November 1875, and divided his time between Taveiro and Santar. In 1904, by decree of 23 January, Carlos I made him Count of Santar, with honours of Grandeza.

== Viscounts of Taveiro (1851) ==
#	Holder	Dates	Titles	Notes	Ref.
1	Dona Maria Rosa de Figueiredo da Cunha d'Eça Abreu e Melo Pereira de Lacerda e Lemos	1832–1882	1st Viscountess of Taveiro	Original holder. Daughter of José de Figueiredo da Cunha e Melo and Dona Maria do Cardal Pereira Ramos de Lacerda e Lemos, she lived from 2 April 1832 to 9 April 1882. She inherited the entailed estate of Taveiro and represented the Melo e Cunha branch of São Pedro do Sul. Her husband, José de Melo Pais do Amaral de Sousa Pereira de Vasconcelos e Meneses, whom she married in 1849, was authorised to use the title.	
2	José Pedro Paulo de Melo de Figueiredo Pais do Amaral	1853–1914	2nd Viscount of Taveiro (1st Count of Santar)	Eldest son of the 1st Viscounts, born on 22 December 1853. A fidalgo of the Royal Household, he received the title for its second life by decree of 11 July 1878 and in 1904 was made Count of Santar, with Grandeza. In 1875 he married Dona Margarida Vieira de Magalhães in Lisbon, daughter of the Counts of Magalhães.	

== Claimants under the Republic ==
Following the establishment of the Republic in 1910, the state stopped granting titles of nobility. Since then, the following members of the family have claimed to represent the title:

#	Name	Dates	Titles claimed	Notes	Ref.
3	Pedro Paulo António de Melo de Figueiredo Pais do Amaral	1905–1947	3rd Viscount of Taveiro	Son of António Vasco José de Melo de Figueiredo Pais do Amaral and Dona Maria Quitéria Gil de Borja de Macedo e Meneses, and thus grandson of the 2nd Viscount. He lived from 7 March 1905 to 29 May 1947. He assumed the title with the consent of Manuel II, who was then in exile. On 3 May 1928 he married Dona Maria Luísa Henriques Pereira de Faria Saldanha e Lancastre, daughter of the 4th Counts of Alcáçovas.	
4	Maria Teresa de Lancastre de Melo	1928–2015	4th Viscountess of Taveiro	Only daughter of the preceding. She married José Luís de Andrade de Vasconcelos e Sousa, claimant to the title of Marquis of Santa Iria, and had children.	
5	José Luís de Mello de Vasconcellos e Sousa	b. 1959	5th Viscount of Taveiro	Son of the preceding, born in Lisbon on 14 February 1959. He graduated in economics from the University of Lausanne and headed the Edmond de Rothschild Europe bank in Portugal. Together with his brother Pedro, he founded the Santar Vila Jardim project. He chairs the supervisory board of the Friends of the Ajuda Botanical Garden (Associação dos Amigos do Jardim Botânico da Ajuda). In September 2026 he was the subject of an episode of the SIC television segment Sangue Azul (Blue Blood).	
6	Maria Luísa Austad de Vasconcellos e Sousa	b. 1995	6th Viscountess of Taveiro	Daughter of the preceding. In September 2026 she was the subject of an episode of the SIC television segment Sangue Azul (Blue Blood).	
