= Cunha =

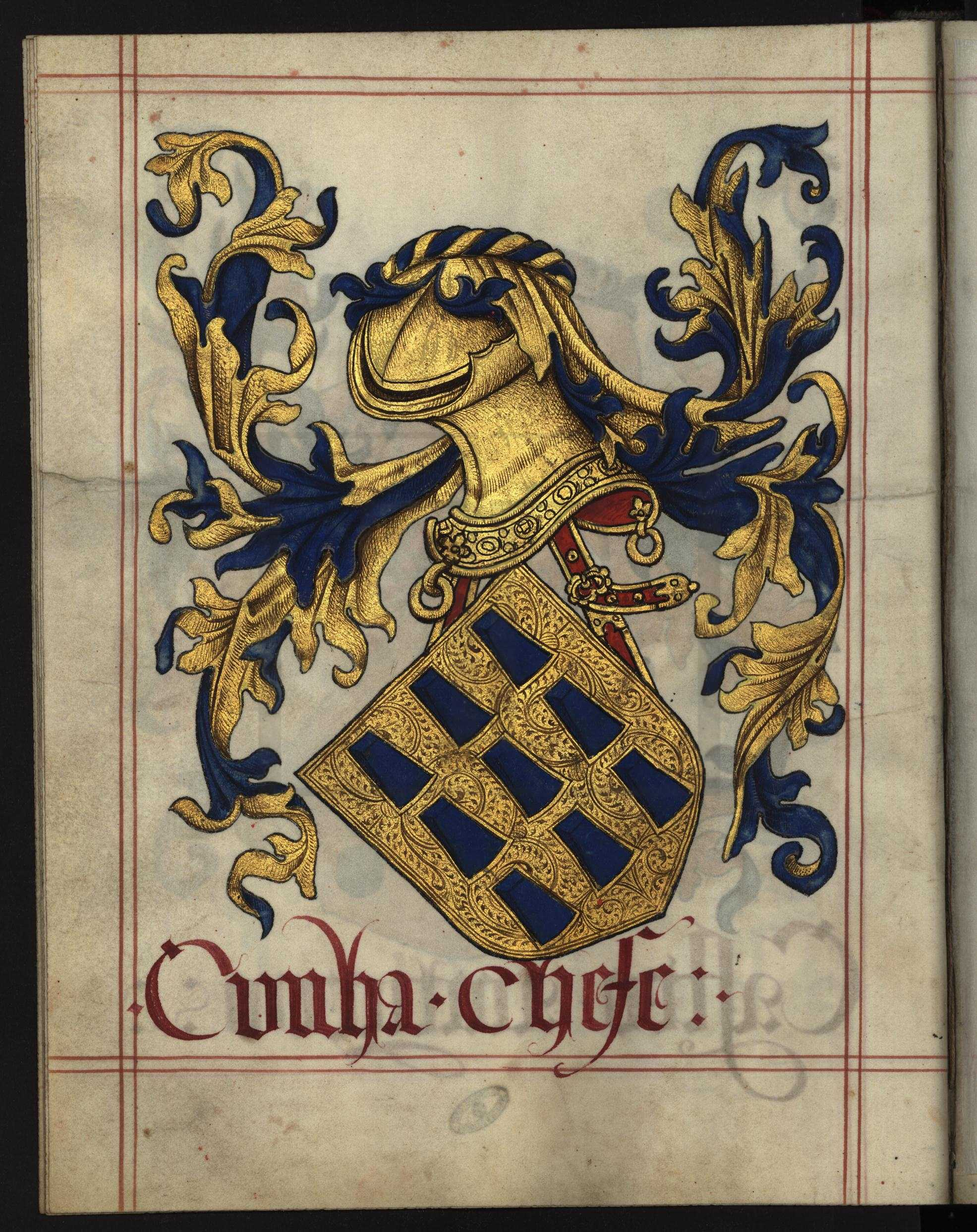
the traditional Cunha coat of arms from the Livro do Armeiro-Mor.

Cunha is a Galician and Portuguese surname of toponymic origin, documented since the 13th century.

Notable people having this surname include:

- Aécio Ferreira da Cunha (1927–2010), Brazilian politician
- Alexandra Cunha (born 1962), Portuguese marine biologist
- Alexandre da Cunha (born 1969), Brazilian-British artist
- Álvaro da Cunha (1371–?), Portuguese nobleman
- Álvaro Soares da Cunha (c. 1466–1557), Portuguese nobleman
- Alvito D'Cunha (born 1978), Indian footballer
- Amaro da Cunha (1912–1988), Brazilian rower
- Ambrósio Leitão da Cunha (1825–1898), Brazilian lawyer and politician
- André Cunha, multiple people
- António Dias da Cunha (born 1933), Portuguese businessman
- Arthur Cunha (born 1990), Brazilian footballer
- Brasílio Itiberê da Cunha (1846–1913), Brazilian composer
- Carlos Alberto Cunha (1959–2016), Brazilian judoka
- Celso Ferreira da Cunha (1917–1989), Brazilian professor, philologist and essayist
- Colin D'Cunha, Canadian physician
- David Da Cunha (born 1983), French football player
- Delfina Benigna da Cunha (1791–1857), Brazilian poet
- Delegado Da Cunha (born 1977), Brazilian politician
- Diego Ribas da Cunha (born 1985), Brazilian international footballer
- Domingos da Cunha (c. 1598–1644), the Cabrinha, Portuguese Jesuit painter
- Edgar Moreira da Cunha (born 1953), Brazilian-born American prelate
- Eduardo Cunha (born 1958), former president of the Brazilian Chamber of Deputies 2015–2016
- Euclides da Cunha (1866–1909), Brazilian journalist, sociologist and engineer
- Francisco de Vasconcelos da Cunha (c. 1590–c. mid 17th century), Portuguese colonial administrator
- Francisco Maria da Cunha (1832–1909), Portuguese military, political and colonial administrator
- Gerard da Cunha (born 1955), Indian architect
- Gerson da Cunha (c. 1927–2022), Indian actor
- Ignatius D'Cunha (1924–2007), Indian bishop
- Jair Cunha (born 2005), Brazilian footballer
- Joanne Da Cunha (born 1990), Indian actress, singer and model
- João Cunha (disambiguation), multiple people
- John da Cunha (1922–2006), British barrister and circuit judge
- John Michael D'Cunha (born 1959), Indian judge
- José da Cunha (disambiguation), multiple people
- Juliana Carneiro da Cunha (born 1949), French-Brazilian actress and dancer
- Lucas Da Cunha (born 2001), French-Portuguese footballer
- Dom Luís da Cunha (1662–1749), Portuguese diplomat
- Leander D'Cunha (born 1977), Indian footballer
- Lix da Cunha (1896–1984), Brazilian engineer, architect, developer
- Luis Veiga da Cunha (born 1936), Portuguese scientist
- Manuela Carneiro da Cunha (born 1943), Portuguese-Brazilian anthropologist
- Marco Aurélio Cunha dos Santos, better known as Marco Aurélio (born 1967), Brazilian footballer
- Maria Adelaide Coelho da Cunha (1869–1954), Portuguese socialite
- Maria da Cunha (1872–1917), Portuguese poet and journalist
- Maria da Graça Amado da Cunha (1919–2001), Portuguese classical pianist
- Maria do Carmo, better known as "Carmen Miranda" da Cunha (1909–1955), singer, actress and dancer
- Martim Lourenço da Cunha (1300–?), Portuguese nobleman
- Matheus Cunha (born 1999), Brazilian footballer
- Nani (born 1986), real name Luis da Cunha, Portuguese international footballer
- Neil D'Cunha, Indian Malayali cinematographer
- Nuno da Cunha (c. 1487–1539), governor of Portuguese possessions in India from 1528 to 1538
- Nuno da Cunha and Ataíde, (1664–1750) Cardinal Priest of Sant'Atanasia, Bishop of Targa
- Osvaldo Cunha (born 1943), Brazilian footballer
- Osvaldo Rodrigues da Cunha (1928–2011), Brazilian herpetologist
- Pedro Correia da Cunha (1440–1497), Portuguese nobleman
- Philipp da Cunha (born 1987), German politician
- Rodrigo da Cunha (1577–1643), Portuguese prelate
- Samuel Lopes da Cunha (born 1984) Brazilian footballer
- Shayne D'Cunha (born 1996), Indian-born Australian soccer player
- Sylvester da Cunha (1930–2023), Indian advertising professional, actor, social worker and author
- Sylvia Cunha (born 1973), American music business, and publishing professional
- Talles Cunha (born 1989), Brazilian footballer
- Thiago Cunha (born 1985), Brazilian–born East Timorese footballer
- Tiago Carneiro da Cunha (born 1973), Brazilian artist
- Tristão da Cunha (1460–1540), Portuguese explorer and naval commander
- Tristão de Bragança Cunha (1878–1938), Indian nationalist and anti-colonial activist
- Tristão Ferreira da Cunha (1890–1974), Brazilian politician, lawyer and scholar
- Virginia da Cunha (born 1981), Argentine singer, actress and dancer
- Waldemar Esteves da Cunha (1920–2013), Brazilian King Momo
- Zeca Cunha (1935–2013), Hong Kong field hockey player

Locations with the name Cunha include:

- Cunha, São Paulo, a municipality in the state of São Paulo in Brazil
- Cunha Porã, a municipality in the state of Santa Catarina in the South region of Brazil
- Flores da Cunha, a municipality in the state of Rio Grande do Sul, Brazil
- Tristan da Cunha, a remote group of volcanic islands in the south Atlantic Ocean
