= Gonçalo Anes de Briteiros =

Portuguese nobleman (1280–1329)

- Rico-Homen
- Born: 1280; Kingdom of Portugal
- Died: 1329; Kingdom of Portugal
- Noble family: Briteiros
- Spouse: Sancha de Guzmán

Gonçalo Anes de Briteiros or Berredo (1280–1329) was a Portuguese nobleman, member of the court of Denis of Portugal (his uncle).

== Biography ==
Gonçalo was the son of João Mendes de Briteiros and Urraca Afonso, natural daughter of Afonso III of Portugal and Madragana.

In addition to having served King Denis, Gonçalo Anes de Briteiros swore loyalty to Afonso IV of Portugal, serving in his court until his death. He was married to Sancha de Guzmán, daughter of Pedro Nuñez de Guzmán and Inés Fernandes de Lima, belonging to a noble family of Castile. His wife was the granddaughter of Juan Pérez de Guzmán, lord of Gumiel de Mercado.
