= João Lourenço da Cunha =

Portuguese nobleman

- Lord of Pombeiro
- Born: Kingdom of Portugal
- Died: c. 1385; Kingdom of Portugal
- Father: Martim Lourenço da Cunha
- Mother: Maria (or Margarida) Gonçalves de Briteiros

João Lourenço da Cunha (died c. 1385) was a Portuguese nobleman, 2nd Lord of Pombeiro.

== Life ==
João was born in Portugal, son of Martim Lourenço da Cunha and Maria (or Margarida) Gonçalves de Briteiros, maternal granddaughter of Martim Afonso Chichorro, whose first husband was Martim Afonso de Sousa, having by him a daughter, Beatriz de Sousa, wife of Enrique Manuel de Villena, whom Leonor Teles would call her sister-in-law.

In 1365, he married Leonor Teles to whom he was still married when she met King Ferdinand I of Portugal and abandoned her husband to marry the Portuguese king. Two children were born of this marriage; a daughter who died in infancy, and a son Álvaro da Cunha, heir to the lordship of his father.

In 1379, King Ferdinand confiscated João Lourenço's properties and gave them to Fernão Afonso de Albuquerque. He left his country and returned to Portugal at the end of 1383 after the king's death.

According to the legends and traditions of Valladolid collected by Juan Agapito y Revilla, a 19th – 20th century architect and local chronicler, João Lourenço da Cunha fled from the Portuguese court and found refuge in Valladolid where he lived the rest of his life and where he walked around the city wearing a hat with a string to which were attached silver horns manifesting his condition as a cuckold. This is in contradiction with Portuguese sources according to which, after the death of King Ferdinand, he returned to Portugal at the end of 1383 where he received several donations from the master of Aviz who, at João Lourenço's behest, on 17 April 1385, issued a letter confirming that Álvaro, up to then considered a bastard son of Lope Dias de Sousa, was actually his son whose real name was Álvaro da Cunha. In his last will, João Lourenço da Cunha left his properties and title to his son Álvaro da Cunha, the son whom "he had never dared to mention during the lifetime of King Ferdinand".

João Lourenço da Cunha died in Portugal in 1385 or shortly afterwards, according to Portuguese sources.

== Bibliography ==
- Agapito y Revilla, Juan (1915). "Tradiciones de Valladolid. Una reina de Portugal". Sociedad Castellana de Excursiones (Año XIII, num. 154). Digital copy. Valladolid. Junta de Castilla y León. Consejería de Cultura y Turismo. Valladolid: Imprentas de Juan R. Hernando: 220–223. OCLC 921858261.
- Braamcamp Freire, Anselmo (1921). Livro primeiro dos Brasões de Sintra (in Portuguese). Coimbra: Imprensa da Universidade. OCLC 794223590.
- Olivera Serrano, César (2005). Beatriz de Portugal. La pugna dinástica Avís-Trastámara (PDF) (in Spanish). CSIC. ISBN 9788400083434.
- Rodrigues Oliveira, Ana (2010). Rainhas medievais de Portugal. Dezassete mulheres, duas dinastias, quatro séculos de História (in Portuguese). Lisbon: A esfera dos livros. ISBN 978-989-626-261-7.
- Sotto Mayor Pizarro, José Augusto P. (1987). Os Patronos do Mosteiro de Grijo: Evolução e Estrutura da Familia Nobre Séculos XI a XIV (in Portuguese). Vol. I. Oporto.
