= Nisha Sharma =

Nisha Sharma may refer to:

- Nisha Sharma (field hockey)
- Nisha Sharma (actor)
- Nisha Sharma, accuser in the Nisha Sharma dowry case, an anti-dowry lawsuit
- Nisha Sharma (author)
