= José da Cunha =

José da Cunha may refer to:

- José Gerson da Cunha (1844–1900), a Goan physician
- José Anastácio da Cunha (1744–1787), a Portuguese mathematician
- José da Cunha Taborda (1766–1836), a Portuguese painter and architect
- José Narciso da Cunha Rodrigues (born 1940), a Portuguese jurist and judge
- José Messias da Cunha (1928–2015), known as José Messias, a Brazilian singer and media personality
- José Policarpo da Cunha (1935–2013), known as Zeca Cunha, a Hong Kong field hockey player
- José Cunha (footballer) (born 2001), Portuguese footballer
- José da Cunha (racing driver)
