= Álvaro da Cunha =

Portuguese nobleman

- Lord
- Born: c. 1371; Kingdom of Portugal
- Died: 15th-century Kingdom of Portugal

Álvaro da Cunha (c. 1371–?) was a Portuguese nobleman, 3rd Lord of Pombeiro.

== Biography ==
Álvaro was born in Portugal, was the son of João Lourenço da Cunha and Leonor Telles de Meneses. His wife was Beatriz Martins de Melo a descendant of Afonso Mendes de Melo.

His daughter Filipa da Cunha married Leonel de Lima, the first Viscount of Vila Nova de Cerveira, in 1432.
