= Afonso Mendes de Melo =

Medieval Knight

- Lord
- Born: 13th century Kingdom of Portugal
- Died: 13th century Kingdom of Portugal
- Spouse: Inês Vasques

Afonso Mendes de Melo (1240-1280) 2nd Lord of Melo, was a medieval knight, rico-homem (rich-men) of the Kingdom of Portugal.

He was born in Portugal, the son of Mem Soares de Melo, 1st Lord de Melo and Teresa Afonso Gato, daughter of Afonso Pires Gato and Urraca Fernandes de Lumiares. His wife was Inês Vasques, daughter of Vasco Lourenço da Cunha.
