= João Cunha =

João Cunha is the name of:

- João Cunha (footballer), Portuguese footballer
- João Cunha (jiu-jitsu), Brazilian martial artist
- João Cunha (politician), Brazilian politician
- João Cunha e Silva, Portuguese tennis player
- João Paulo Cunha, Brazilian politician
- João Matos Cunha, Brazilian para athlete
- João Lourenço da Cunha, Portuguese nobleman
