= João Mendes de Briteiros =

Portuguese nobleman

- Rico-Homen
- Born: 13th-century Portugal
- Died: 14th-century Portugal
- Occupation: Military

João Mendes de Briteiros (13th-century-?) was a Portuguese nobleman, who served in the Court of Denis of Portugal.

== Biography ==
João was born in the Iberian Peninsula, son of Mem Rodrigues de Briteiros and Maria Anes da Veiga, a noble lady descendant of Forjaz Vermuis, belonging to the Lords of Trastámara and Maia. He was married to Urraca Afonso, daughter of Afonso III of Portugal and his mistress Madragana.
