= Leonel de Lima =

Portuguese nobleman

- 1st Viscount of Vila Nova de Cerveira
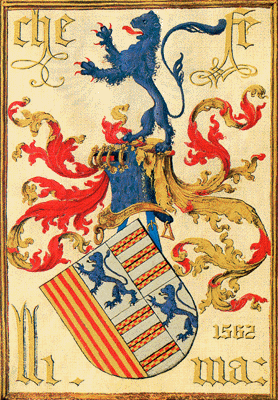
- Coat of arms
- Tenure: 1429 – 1495
- Predecessor: Álvaro Rodrigues de Lima
- Heir apparent: João de Lima
- Born: 1403; Viana do Castelo, Portugal
- Died: 1495-04-13 (aged 74–75); Portugal
- Noble family: Lima
- Spouse: Filipa da Cunha
- Father: Fernão Eanes de Lima
- Mother: Teresa da Silva

Leonel de Lima (1403 – 13 April 1495) was a Portuguese nobleman, the first Viscount of Vila Nova de Cerveira and the first person to hold a noble title of viscount in Portugal. Born into a noble family, he inherited lands and rights, which he actively defended. He expanded his influence over the town of Ponte de Lima, leading to several conflicts between the two. He held multiple offices, such as alcaide in Ponte de Lima and coudel.

== Early Life and Family Background ==
Leonel de Lima was born in 1403, son of Fernão Eanes de Lima and Teresa da Silva. His father, Fernão Eanes, was a notable nobleman who significantly elevated the family's status through royal favor granted by King João I of Portugal. Fernão was granted extensive lands and jurisdictions, including the house in Giela, in Arcos de Valdevez and the territories of Fraião, Coura, São Martinho, São Estêvão, Jaraz, and Vai de Vez, in the region of Entre Douro e Minho, with full civil and criminal jurisdiction rights. These grants, made between 1398 and 1399, firmly established the Lima family's territorial base and legal authority in northern Portugal. Fernão also held the office of coudel, an administrative and judicial role that included privileges such as appointing meirinhos (local magistrates).

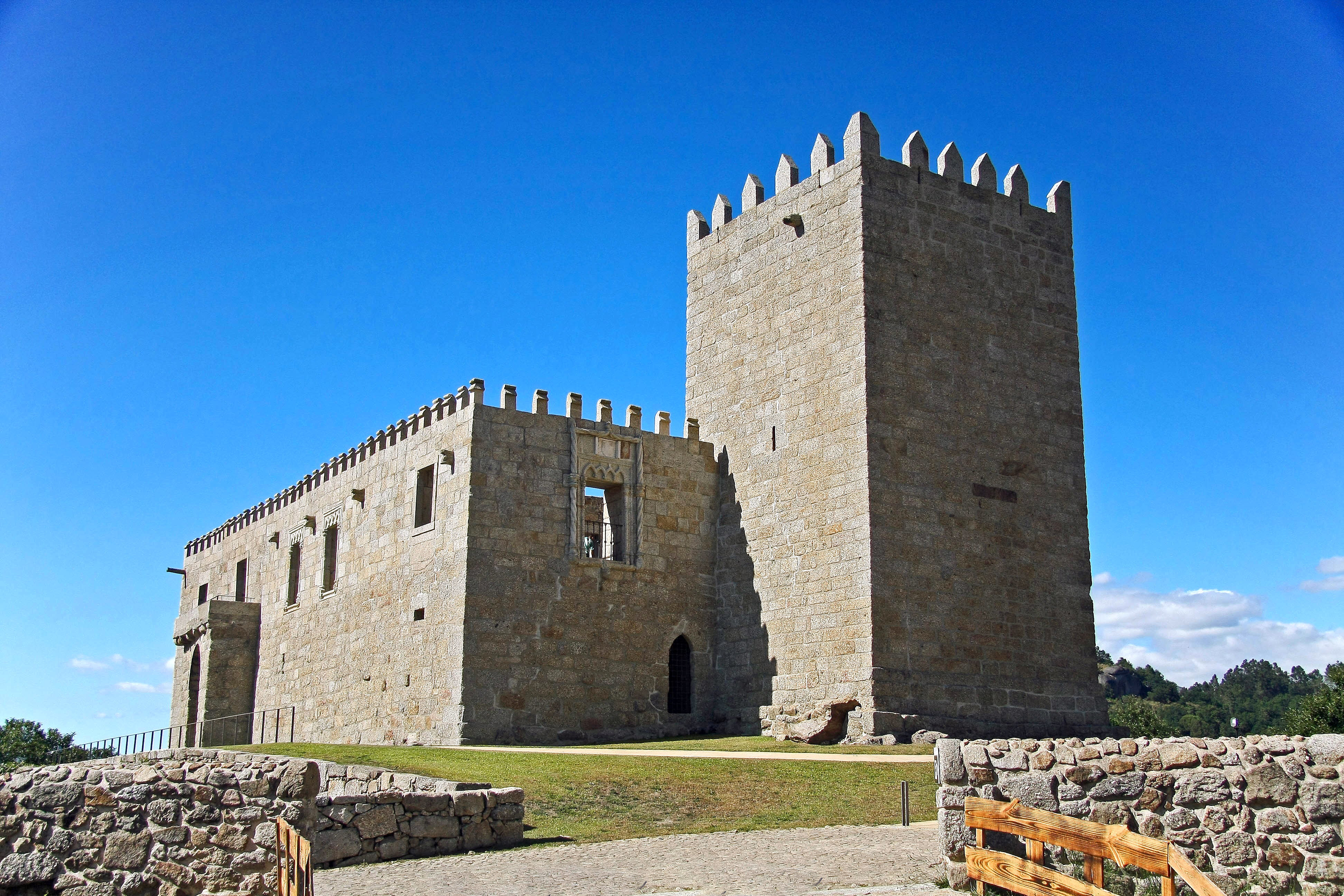
House in Giela (Paço da Giela)

Leonel was the second son of Fernão Eanes de Lima. His elder brother, Álvaro Rodrigues de Lima, initially inherited their father's titles and estates in 1405, but died without heirs by around 1429. Following Álvaro's death, Leonel inherited the family estates and rights. This succession required special royal confirmation by King João I, as it was an exception to the prevailing “lei mental” (mental law), which generally restricted inheritance to direct descendants rather than siblings.

Leonel began his career as a page and later a trusted servant to the Infante Dom Duarte, son of King João I. His close relationship with the royal family helped him secure the confirmation of his inheritance and gain further royal favor. In 1432, Leonel married Dona Filipa da Cunha, daughter of Álvaro da Cunha, 3rd Lord of Pombeiro, and Beatriz Martins de Melo. This marriage connected the Lima family with some of the most prominent noble houses of Portugal, including ties to the former Queen Leonor Teles through Filipa's paternal lineage, and to the influential Melo family through her mother.

== Territorial Authority and Jurisdictional Conflicts ==
During the 15th century, Leonel de Lima was a prominent noble deeply involved in political and jurisdictional struggles in northern Portugal. His influence was closely tied to the region of Entre Douro e Minho, where he both asserted his family's rights and clashed repeatedly with local authorities.

Points of contention with the town of Ponte de Lima included residence rights and jurisdiction over the land of São Martinho. Although the Crown had granted São Martinho to Leonel's father in 1399, the town of Ponte de Lima never fully accepted the Lima family's authority in the area. In 1441, the town brought formal complaints against Leonel before the royal court, claiming that his family had never lawfully exercised coudel jurisdiction there. The dispute persisted into the 1470s, with the town invoking earlier royal rulings to reinforce its position.

In the late 1430s, Leonel established a residence within the walls of Ponte de Lima. His presence was perceived by the town as a direct challenge to municipal autonomy. In 1462, following renewed complaints, King Afonso V ordered regional nobles to present documentation proving their jurisdictional rights and reaffirmed earlier grants made to the Lima family, likely at Leonel's request. That same year, a now-lost court decision upheld Leonel's right to reside in the town. In response, the townspeople secured a royal grace document on 18 August 1462, guaranteeing the preservation of Ponte de Lima's privileges after Leonel's death.

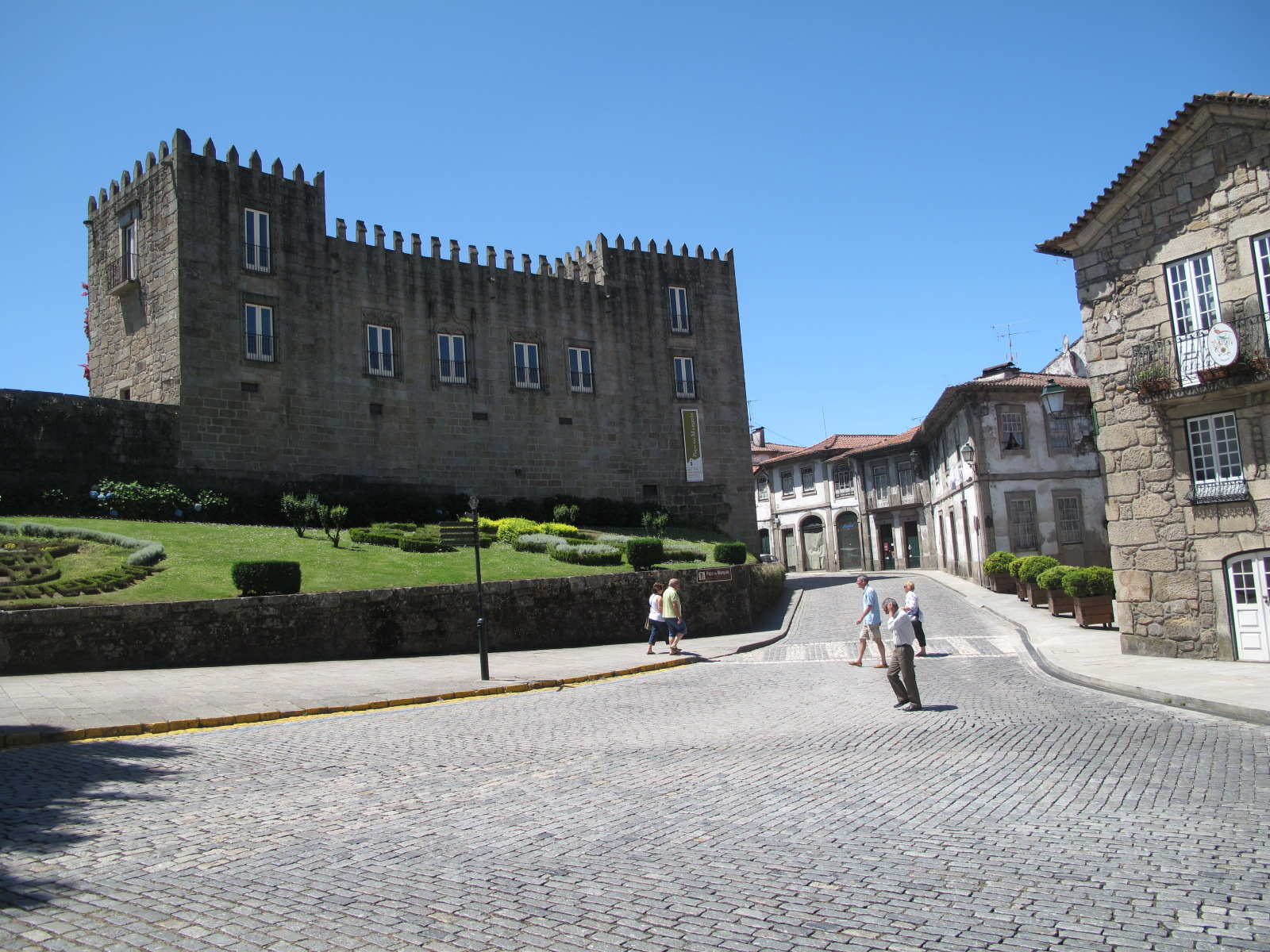
Paço do marquês in Ponte Lima

Meanwhile, in September 1461, Leonel transferred the revenues, tolls, and jurisdictional rights over Ponte de Lima to his eldest son, João de Lima, to take effect in January 1462. This act ensured the continuity of family control over the town despite the opposition they faced. In 1464, Leonel was appointed alcaide (castle governor) of Ponte de Lima and received royal authorization to erect a castle, which became the Paços do Marquês.

In 1478, Leonel was granted the town of Vila Nova de Cerveira and elevated to the title of viscount by King Afonso V, becoming the first person to hold a noble title of viscount in Portugal. In 1480, he petitioned the Crown to bar his younger sons from residing in Ponte de Lima or in his lands, restricting them to occasional visits at his discretion.

== Legacy ==
Leonel de Lima died on 13 April 1495 and his eldest son, João de Lima, succeeded him as holder of the family estates and titles.
