= Urraca Afonso =

Portuguese noble lady (c. 1260 – 1290?)

- Infanta of Portugal
- Born: c. 1260; Kingdom of Portugal
- Died: possibly 1290; Kingdom of Portugal
- Buried: Mosteiro de São João de Tarouca
- Noble family: Portuguese House of Burgundy
- Father: Afonso III
- Mother: Madragana

Urraca Afonso (c. 1260 – 1290?) was a Portuguese noble lady, illegitimate daughter of Afonso III of Portugal and Madragana Ben Aloandro. And half sister of Denis of Portugal.

Urraca was married twice, first to Pedro Anes Gago, and then with João Mendes de Briteiros.
