= Esther Hnamte =

Indian singer and child prodigy

- Born: Esther Lalduhawmi Hnamte; 9 June 2016 (age 10); Lunglei, Mizoram, India
- Genre: Folk music
- Years active: 2020–present
- Label: Melody Records

Esther Lalduhawmi Hnamte (born 9 June 2016) is a child singer and prodigy from Mizoram, India. She became a media sensation in late 2020 when her rendition of A. R. Rahman's song "Maa Tujhe Salaam" went viral. She became the fastest viewer-gaining artists on YouTube among the Mizo people.

Hnamte had received recognitions such as special appreciation award from the Governor of Mizoram, and the Young Achievers Award from Dalmia Cement Bharat Limited in 2021. She is the youngest member of Mizo Zaimi Inzawmkhawm, which presented her its 2021 "Non-native Award" for Jana Gana Mana, a music video made with the Indian Army.

A documentary of her life A Star is Born won the Best Documentary Award (Silver) at the Northeast Film Festival in 2023. In 2025, she received the YouTube Creator Awards (both the Silver Play Button and the Gold Play Button awards). She is a recipient of the Pradhan Mantri Rashtriya Bal Puraskar, the highest civilian award in India for children.

== Life ==
Esther Hnamte was born on 9 June 2016 in Lunglei, Mizoram. She is the youngest of three children of Lalrinenga Hnamte, a taxi driver, and R. Lalawmpui. Her musical interest is mainly fostered by her mother, a retired soprano of the local church choir. Before her birth, her mother almost gave her up for abortion, upon doctor's advice, due to pregnancy complications. It was a major concern since Lalawmpuii had lost her first born after complicated caesarian section, and her second child was also born of the same procedure. She already had abortion pills prescribed to her. Against medical advice, she decided to go through the consequences. Hnamte was born with a high-pitched voice to which people at the hospital commented that she was going to be a good singer.

As a native of Mizo, Hnamte does not speak other language. She had to memorise Hindi and English songs by repeated singing with her friends. She could sing properly when she turned two years of age, and unusually good at picking tunes and lyrics. In one instance, she learned "One Day at a Time" in the morning, and was ready for recording in the afternoon. Her first music video "Ka Nu Ka Pa Min Ṭawngṭaisak Rawh", a prayer song, was made in 2019 for which her father created her a YouTube channel. Her breakthrough song "Maa Tujhe Salaam" was recorded at home during the COVID-19 restrictions. By November 2020, she had amassed over 200,000 subscribers.

Hnamte is studying at the Assam Rifles Public School in Lunglei, and her education is sponsored by the Assam Rifles.

== Music videos ==
=== Maa Tujhe Salaam ===
Considered as patriotic song in India, Maa Tujhe Salaam is A. R. Rahman's rendition of Vande Mataram (meaning "I bow to thee, Mother") and is a Guinness World Records holder for a song performed in the most languages. Vande Mataram is originally a Sanskrit poem by Bankim Chandra Chatterjee and the first two verses of which were as the National Song of India in October 1937 by the Congress Working Committee. The Hindustan Times reported, "There are many who have sung renditions of AR Rahman's Maa Tujhe Salaam. However, there are only a few versions [referring to Hnamte's version] that would give you goosebumps like the original one." Hnamte's music video was posted on 25 October on YouTube and widely appreciated throughout the country, receiving 171,000 views in three days, over 73,000 subscribers, and 68,000 likes within a week.

The video was made by Kima Chhangte of the Melody Records. The caption on her video reads:

Dear brothers and sisters, be proud that you are an Indian. It is a land of love, care and affection. So lovely the variety in languages, cultures, lifestyle. Let us stand together to be good sons and daughters for our motherland in spite of the diversities.

The Chief Minister of Mizoram, Zoramthanga commented her on Twitter as "mesmerizing," while Prime Minister Narendra Modi concurred as "Adorable and admirable!" Rahman also reacted, saying, "When you are showered with cuteness and love." Rahman's agent contacted Hnamte through her maternal uncle D. Renthlei in November 2020 discussing possible support from Rahman.

=== National anthem ===
On 13 August 2021, Hnamte released a music video Jana Gana Mana, the national anthem of India, on YouTube. It received over three million views within a week. It featured the Indian Army, 3 Assam Rifles, headquartered in Lunglei, which supported the video production. The music was also played by the army band. According to the former Indian Air Marshal Anil Chopra, the Indian Army had appreciated her patriotic singing and tracked her to her home to make this music video. The video description reads:

This music video 'National Anthem' has been made to celebrate India's 75th Independence Day. It is a tribute to all the fallen heroes who sacrificed their lives at the altar of freedom. We hope this video makes us realise the value of freedom we enjoy.

== Awards and honours ==
On 7 November 2020, the Governor of Mizoram P. S. Sreedharan Pillai gave Esther Hnamte a special award carrying a certificate and cash prize. Hnamte also made her first formal public performance at the Governor's visit programme at Lunglei on 10 March 2021.

In January 2021, India's largest dairy firm Amul honoured Hnamte as its Amul Girl. The poster caricature bears the slogan: "Esthereal performance! Amul vandeful taste."

On 12 January 2021, Hnamte received the "Young Achievers Award," an annual award established by the Dalmia Cement Bharat Limited for talented young people. She is the youngest recipient. In 2021, she was inducted to the Mizo singers' society, Mizo Zaimi Inzawmkhawm, as a life member and is the youngest member. On 5 November 2021, the MZI gave her the best "Non-native Award" for her music video, Jana Gana Mana.

By 2025, Hnamte became the fastest viewer-gaining artists on YouTube among the Mizo people and the first individual from Mizoram to cross one million subscribers. In April 2025, she received the Silver Play Button and Gold Play Button under the YouTube Creator Awards. On 26 December 2025, she received the Pradhan Mantri Rashtriya Bal Puraskar, the highest civilian award of India for children, in the art and culture category from President Droupadi Murmu.

In early January 2026, Hnamte performed at Antilia upon invitation from businessman Mukesh Ambani. On 16 January, Union Home Minister Amit Shah presented her a guitar on the occasion of Assam Rifles relocation in Aizawl. On 23 August, she performed at the grand finale of the Miss Universe India 2026 in Jaipur, Rajasthan.

== Discography ==
Esther Hnamte has recorded and published the following songs:

1. Maa Tujhe Salaam (2020)
2. Dilna Hlawhtlin Tirtu Lalpa (2020)
3. One Day at a Time (2020)
4. The Greatest Gift of All (2020, with R. Lalramchhana)
5. Jana Gana Mana (2021)

== Documentary ==
The biography of Hnamte was released as a film A Star is Born in 2023. The 28-minute documentary was made by Napoleon RZ Thanga, and it received the Best Documentary Award (Silver) at the Northeast Film Festival. The festival was organised at Mumbai between 24 and 26 March 2023 by the Sikkim Film Board and the Ministry of Information and Broadcasting, Government of India.

== See also ==
- Hmar people
