= Nisha Sharma dowry case =

2003–2012 Indian court case

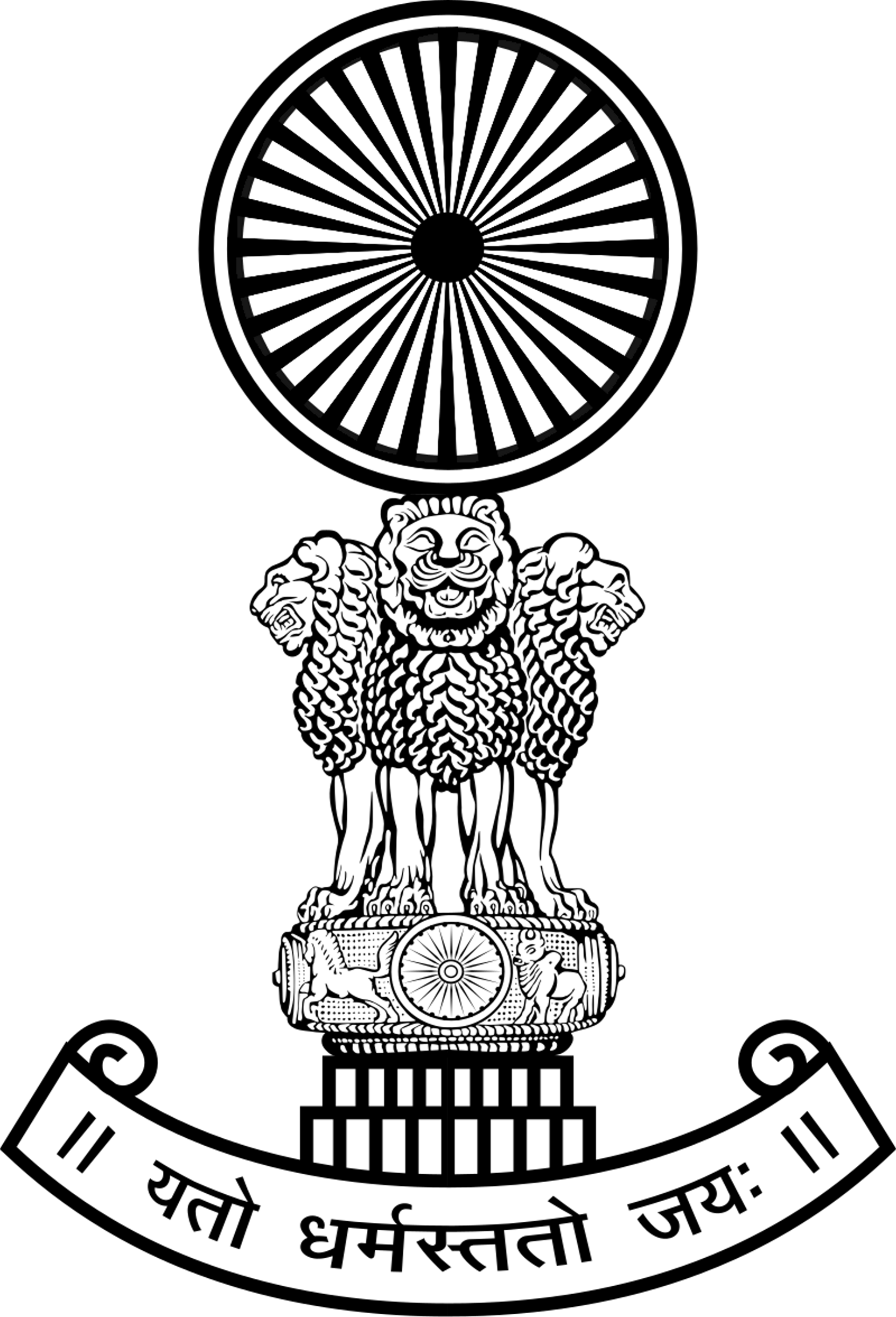
Judiciary of India

The 2003 Nisha Sharma dowry case was an anti-dowry lawsuit that has been cited as an illustrative example highlighting the potential for misuse of the IPC 498A law in India.

In this case, Nisha Sharma accused her prospective groom, Munish Dalal, of dowry demands, raising questions about the dynamics and fairness of such allegations within the legal framework.

The case got much coverage from Indian and international media. Nisha was portrayed as a youth icon and a role model for other women. The case ended in 2012, after the court acquitted all accused. The court found that Nisha had fabricated the dowry charges in an effort to avoid marrying her fiancé.

== Background ==
In 2003, Nisha Sharma was a 21-year old software engineering student. Munish Dalal was a 25-year-old engineer who worked as a lecturer of computer science in a local college. In order to arrange a suitable matrimonial alliance for Nisha, her parents, Dev Dutt and Hemlata, placed a matrimonial advertisement in a newspaper. This is a very common practice in India. Munish's mother, Vidya Devi Dalal, was among those who responded to the advertisement and contact was established between the families in this way. After meeting each other a few times and exchanging information, the families decided that Munish and Nisha were compatible and agreed that they be married. The couple was duly engaged and the wedding was scheduled to be held on 11 March 2003 in Noida, where the bride's family lived.

=== Bride's version ===
According to Nisha and her parents, what happened was as follows. They claim that when the groom's procession reached the venue and was being welcomed, Dalal's mother demanded ₹1,200,000 (about US$2,500) more in cash and a Maruti Esteem car from the bride's father. Dev Dutt Sharma expressed his inability to meet these demands, whereupon the Dalal family began verbal abuse. When the Sharma family reacted, a scuffle broke out and Mr. Sharma was slapped by Mrs. Dalal and was spat upon by Mr. Dalal's sister. Upon hearing of this, Nisha called the police.

=== Groom's version ===
The groom's family has an entirely different version. There was absolutely no dispute or talk regarding dowry. As part of some Indian weddings, the groom mounts a white horse and goes in a ceremonial procession to the wedding venue. When the Dalal family arrived at the place where the horse was to be mounted, there was nobody from the bride's family to welcome them. After waiting for some time, the Dalals sent a relative to the wedding venue to find out the reason for the delay. The relative found that there was some commotion at the wedding venue, but he was told that everything is OK and that he should return to the groom and wait for a few minutes. As he was returning, he was followed and overtaken by an agitated man who then accompanied him. There, the agitated man introduced himself as Navneet Rai and made a shocking disclosure. He informed the Dalal family that he was the husband of Nisha Sharma, and that they had been in love with each other for a long time. Just as he had finished talking, Nisha's father and a few other relatives arrived at the scene. The groom was one who called police when Sharma's father assaulted the groom's mother. They claimed that the wedding was disrupted by Navneet Rai, not by them. Rai had allegedly arrived at the venue with some of his friends and told the groom's mother that Nisha was already married to him. Following this, Sharma's father had allegedly assaulted the groom's mother with a sandal and bit her. Sharma's father denied the allegation saying that he had a video recording to prove his statements.

The procession was sent back. The groom and several members of his family were arrested from their residence in Vikaspuri the next day and police began searching for other absconding relatives. The groom's mother, Vidya Dalal, was arrested on 15 May.

Soon thereafter, Navneet Rai, a classmate of Sharma, came forward claiming to be in a relationship with her for 5 years and having married her secretly. Nisha's father said that Rai was simply maligning their name. He said that Nisha was initially interested in marrying Rai, but he had opposed the marriage as Rai was unemployed and was seeking to live off their money. He also said that after rejection Rai has misbehaved with Nisha and Nisha had written a complaint to the college which resulted in the expulsion of Rai.

== Media attention and reactions ==
Following the arrest, the story got much attention from Indian and international media. The news appeared on the front-page of several newspapers. Sharma also received several marriage proposals from across the nation. Her house was visited by several media persons seeking her interview. She was also visited by women rights activists, neighbours and other well-wishers to congratulate her. A political party invited her to contest in the local election. In an interview with Ehtashamuddin Khan of Rediff, Nisha said she had no intention of joining politics, and that she wanted to continue her studies and wished to have an arranged marriage.

James Brooke, writing for The New York Times, detailed how dowry is being disguised as gifts as dowry is illegal in India. The story was also covered by Christiane Amanpour for 60 Minutes which contained an overview of the dowry system in India, the anti-dowry laws, bride burning and female foeticide. Smriti Kak writing for The Tribune criticised the father and the bride for agreeing to the dowry initially and stopping the wedding only when the demands got too high. The incident was also captured in an Amul Butter Girl cartoon.

Brinda Karat, a politician and activist, said that the parents had sent the wrong signal by agreeing to too many gifts initially. Ranjana Kumari, a women's rights activist, said that she does not attend weddings because dowry is given in almost all of them, and that dowry is a cause of female foeticide in India as parents see a girl child as an economic burden. Jyotsna Chatterji, another women right's activist, said that this one protest had given courage to other women to come forward.

== Nisha Sharma's marriage ==
On 19 November 2003, Nisha married Ashwini Sharma, a computer engineer, in a small ceremony in Noida with only 75 guests. The marriage was set up by a common family friend and the engagement took place in September 2003. Her father only gifted her a gold necklace as the bridal gift. The marriage was scheduled to be held in the evening of 19 November. But, it was held on 3:00 am on 19 November to avoid legal hassles. Munish Dalal and Navneet Rai had approached the court to delay the marriage.

== Appearance on The Oprah Winfrey Show ==
In January 2004, Nisha, her husband and her brother were invited by Oprah Winfrey to her talkshow. Oprah told her audience that they were lucky to be born in the United States, and covered the dowry issue by calling it "right out of the Dark Ages".

== Mention in school textbook ==
In 2004, when the case was still under trial, the incident was included the English textbook for Class 6, by the State Council of Educational Research and Training of the New Delhi region, in the form of a chapter titled Man in Jail over Dowry Demand. It was adopted from a newspaper article from May 2003. Munish Dalal sent a defamation notice to the State Council of Educational Research and Training.

Later, Vidya Dalal, the groom's mother and a retired school teacher, said the book was being taught her in her former school and it had ruined her reputation. The family's lawyer, Roopesh Kumar Sharma, said that they were suing the Delhi government and education department. The cartoon in the book showed Munish being arrested from the marriage venue, when he was actually arrested from his home. The lawyer also said that Vidya Dalal was being denied her pension and retirement benefits.

== Trial and verdict ==
A case was filed in the Sector 24 police station of the Noida, against Dalal, his mother Vidya Dalal and his aunt Savitri Sharma. While awaiting trial in mid-May 2003, Munish Dalal was assaulted by other inmates in Dasna jail, who called him a greedy groom. Dalal suffered some injuries as a result. Dalal's lawyer filed an appeal with the National Human Rights Commission of India. Dalal had counter-sued accusing Nisha of adultery and bigamy.

On 29 February 2012, a district court in Gautam Budh Nagar district acquitted Dalal and his family due to lack of evidence supporting the charges. The court also acquitted Navneet Rai, who had been accused of forging the marriage documents by Nisha. The court held the documents circulated by Navneet Rai could not be proven to be forged by the prosecution.

== Aftermath of the verdict ==
In various interviews after the verdict, Munish Dalal said that Nisha's father had been aware of her marriage to Navneet Rai, but he still published an ad in a newspaper. Nisha had married Rai on 14 February 2003 secretly in a temple. On 11 May 2003, when the groom's procession arrived at the venue, they were turned away. While they were returning, they found a complaint had been filed against them. He also said he, his 68-year-old widowed mother and his 75-year-old aunt had to travel to court, which was 75 km away, about 320 times during the course of the trial. Nisha's family attended only 10 times. His mother, a school teacher due for retirement on 31 May 2003, lost her job and was denied her retirement benefits. He also said that he married in 2008 and took no dowry. During the course of the trial, Dalal had become involved with the Save Indian Family Foundation. Giving the cause for the lawsuit Dalal said, "She didn’t want to marry me but was scared of her parents. By accusing me falsely, she was trying to get out of the marriage without incurring their anger."

== Dowry accusation against Nisha Sharma ==
In January 2013, a complaint was filed in Samalkha, Haryana by Manisha Sharma against her husband Gyaneshwar Sharma and sister-in-law Nisha Sharma. Manisha had married Gyaneshwar Sharma on 31 October 2013 and had a child from the marriage. Manisha's father, Vijay Sharma, claimed that Gyaneshwar's family had demanded ₹ 12,00,000 and had beaten Manisha for that.

== See also ==
- Dowry law in India
- Trial by media
- Suhaib Ilyasi, an Indian television personality who was accused of killing his wife for dowry
