= Martim Afonso Chichorro II =

Portuguese nobleman (born 1280)

- nobleman (rico homem)
- Born: 1280; Kingdom of Portugal
- Died: 14th century Kingdom of Portugal
- Noble family: Portuguese House of Burgundy
- Spouse: Aldonça Anes de Briteiros
- Issue: Vasco Martins de Sousa Chichorro (pt)
- Father: Martim Afonso Chichorro
- Mother: Inês Lourenço de Valadares

Martim Afonso Chichorro II or Martin Alfonso de Sousa (1280-?) was a Portuguese nobleman, who served in the Court of Denis of Portugal (his carnal uncle).

== Biography ==
Born in Portugal, he was the son of Martim Afonso Chichorro and Inês Lourenço de Valadares. His paternal grandfather was Afonso III of Portugal. He was married to Aldonça Anes de Briteiros, daughter of João Rodrigues de Briteiros and Guiomar Gil de Soverosa, a family belonging to the Portuguese nobility.
