= Amul girl =

Mascot of an Indian dairy brand

The Amul girl, an advertising mascot used by Amul, an Indian dairy brand

The Amul girl is an advertising mascot used by the Indian dairy brand Amul. The mascot is a hand-drawn cartoon of a young Indian girl dressed in a polka-dotted frock with blue hair and a half-pony tied up. The Amul girl advertising has often been described as one of the best Indian advertising concepts because of its humour.

== Origin ==
The Amul girl was created as a response to Amul's rival brand Polson's butter-girl. The idea was conceived in 1967 once ASP (Advertising, Sales and Promotion) clinched the brand portfolio from the previous agency FCB Ulka. It was executed by Sylvester da Cunha, the owner of the agency, and his art director, Eustace Fernandes, on hoardings, painted bus panels, and posters in Mumbai. The mascot, since then, has been mobilized to comment on many events of national and political importance like the Emergency in India in 1976.

== Development ==
In 1966, Amul decided to give their account to the advertising agency Advertising and Sales Promotion (ASP) to work on their advertising campaign. Da Cunha, the managing director of the agency, and Eustace Fernandez, an art director, decided to create something that would grab the attention of every housewife in the country. Verghese Kurien, then the chairman of the Gujarat Co-operative Milk Marketing Federation Ltd. (GCMMF), suggested a mischievous little girl as a mascot with two requirements. It had to be easy to draw and memorable, as most of the advertising would be outdoor media which required hand-painting in those days, and the hoardings had to be changed frequently.

=== Variation ===
In January 2021, Esther Hnamte, a four-year-old child singer from Mizoram, appeared as the Amul girl. Hnamte had become a media sensation with a music video covering A. R. Rahman's "Maa Tujhe Salaam", which was posted on YouTube on 25 October 2020. The poster caricature shows Hnamte in a Mizo traditional attire waving the Indian tricolour, and bears the slogan: "Esthereal performance! Amul vandeful taste."

== Olympics ==
Amul was seen to come up with an association with Cricket World Cup and Formula-One Racing. Amul was the official sponsor of the Indian team for dairy products for the 2012 Olympic Games.

== Controversies ==
In 2001, Amul ran an advertising campaign criticizing the Indian Airlines strike; the latter threatened to stop offering Amul butter on their flights unless the ads were pulled. Another advertisement during Ganesh Chaturthi said "Ganpati Bappa More Ghya" ("Ganpati Bappa take more"). The Shiv Sena party said that if the advertisement was not removed, they would come and destroy Amul's office. In July 2011, an advertisement criticizing Suresh Kalmadi led to trouble in Pune, while an advertisement poking fun at Mamata Banerjee in December 2011 led to problems in Kolkata. Subsequently, another advertisement with Banerjee was released all over India except in Kolkata in March 2012.

In 2011, when they came up with "Maine kyaa khaya" ("What did I eat?", where the word "eat" bears the meaning of either directly accepting a bribe or indirectly profiting from an illegal act, in the Hindi language) for Suresh Kalmadi over the 2010 Commonwealth Games scam, they ran into trouble. "He was found guilty, he was in jail, his party had abandoned him. But party workers in Pune actually pulled down the hoarding", recalls a bewildered da Cunha.

There was a laughable protest as well. When they wrote "Satyam Sharam Scandalum!" for Satyam Computer Services Ltd.'s disgraced chairman Ramalinga Raju, he says, "We got a formal letter from the Satyam Board threatening us with dire consequences: all their employees would stop eating Amul butter!"

== See also ==
- Britannia baby
- Murphy baby
