= André Cunha =

André Cunha may refer to:

- André Cunha (Portuguese footballer) (born 1978), Portuguese football manager and former midfielder
- André Cunha (Brazilian footballer) (born 1979), Brazilian football right-back

== See also ==
- Andrés Cunha (born 1976), Uruguayan football referee
