= Portuguese House of Burgundy =

Dynasty from 1093 to 1383

Portuguese House of Burgundy Dinastia Afonsina
- Coat of arms of the Kingdom of Portugal (1139)
- Parent house: Capetian dynasty by way of House of Burgundy
- Country: Portugal
- Founded: 1093; 933 years ago
- Founder: Henry, Count of Portugal
- Current head: Extinct
- Final ruler: Beatrice of Portugal
- Titles: King of the Portuguese; King of Portugal; King of the Algarve; King of Galicia; King of Silves; Prince of Portugal; Grand Duke of Portugal; Infante of Portugal; Count of Portugal; Count of Flanders; Count of Urgell
- Deposition: 1385; 641 years ago
- Cadet branches: House of Aviz; House of Braganza

The Portuguese House of Burgundy (Portuguese: Casa de Borgonha) was a Portuguese noble house that ruled the County and later Kingdom of Portugal from its founding until the 1383–85 Portuguese Interregnum.

The house was founded by Henry of Burgundy, who became Count of Portugal in 1096. His son, Afonso Henriques, was proclaimed King of Portugal following his victory at the Battle of Ourique in 1139, establishing the Afonsine dynasty (Dinastia Afonsina). Burgundian monarchs would rule Portugal through much of its early formation, including the formalization of the Portuguese language under King Dinis I, the first Portuguese parliament, under King Afonso II, and the conquest of the Kingdom of the Algarve, under King Afonso III. Numerous princes of the house took up thrones across Europe, such as Ferdinand I, Count of Flanders and Peter I, Count of Urgell. Similarly, many princesses became royal consorts, including Berengaria, Queen of Denmark, Leonor, Queen of Aragon, and Teresa, Duchess of Burgundy, among others.

== History ==
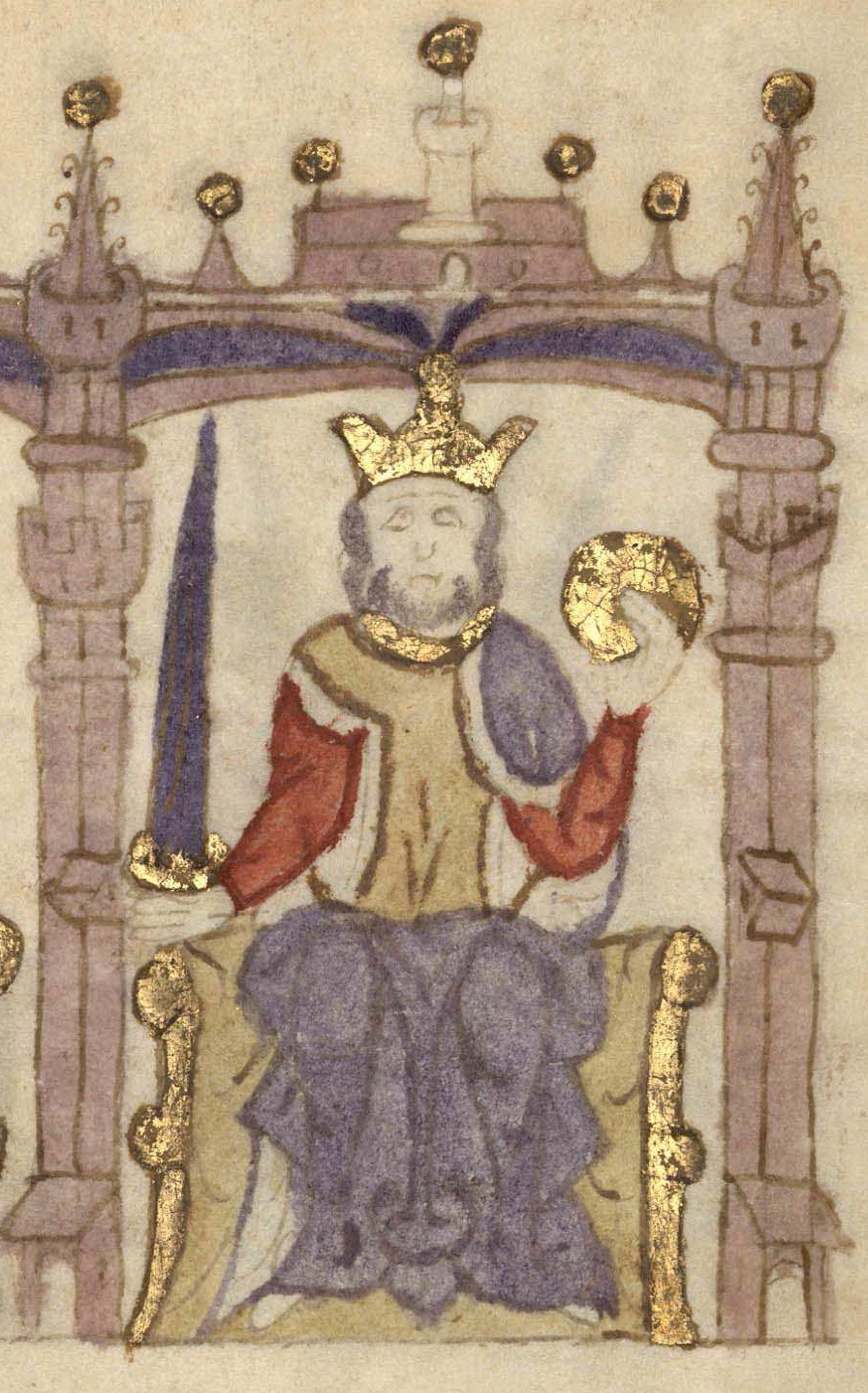
King Afonso I, first Burgundy King of Portugal.

=== Origins ===
Henry, Count of Portugal, a grandson in the senior line of Robert I, Duke of Burgundy, had joined the Reconquista in the Iberian Peninsula in the late 11th century. After conquering parts of Galicia and northern Portugal on behalf of Alfonso VI of León, he married Alfonso's illegitimate daughter, Teresa, and was given the County of Portugal as a fief under the Kingdom of León.

His son, Afonso Henriques, became King of Portugal after defeating his mother in the Battle of São Mamede in 1128. It was only in 1179 that Pope Alexander III recognized Portugal as an independent state, recognition, at the time, needed for total acceptance of the kingdom in the Christian world.

On his mother's side, Afonso I of Portugal is connected to the Jiménez dynasty, and through Sancha of León, to the Astur-Leonese dynasty, making him a descendant of Pelagius of Asturias. As the Chronicle of Alfonso III identifies Pelagius as a grandson of Chindasuinth, this would make Afonso I the descendant of Liuvigild. Liuvigild was King of the Visigoths in the 6th century (see Visigothic dynasty), and conquered the Suebi Kingdom, thus controlling most of the Iberian Peninsula (and all of what would be Portugal, see Visigothic Kingdom). On his father's side, Afonso I of Portugal is connected to the Capetian dynasty, a branch of the Frankish Robertians that goes back to Robert II, Count of Hesbaye in the 9th century.

=== Kings of Portugal ===
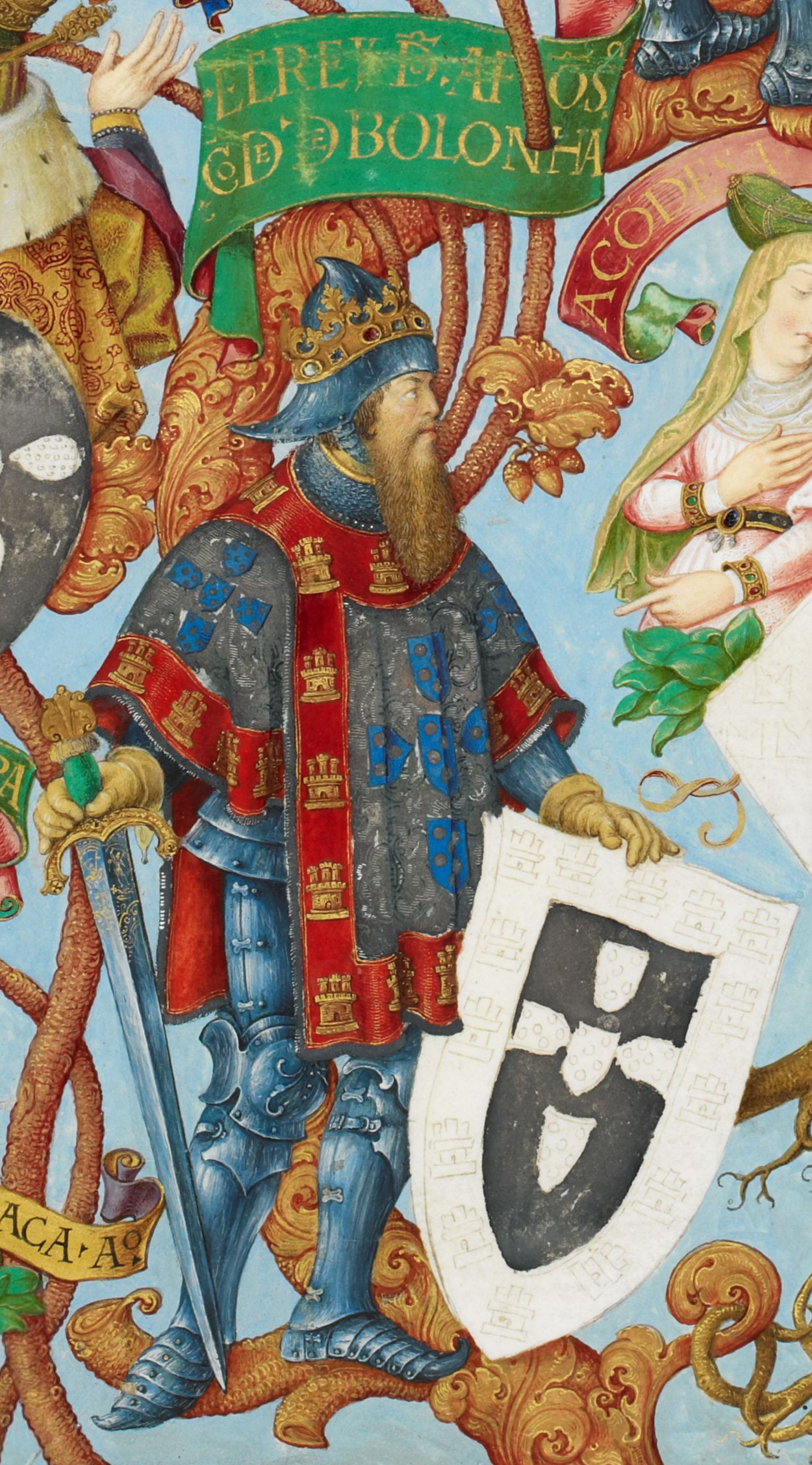
Afonso III, King of Portugal and Count of Boulogne.

The kings that succeeded Afonso I continued the Reconquista of the Iberian Peninsula against the Moors. Afonso III conquered the Algarve and adopted the title of King of Portugal and the Algarve.

The borders of Portugal were defined in the Treaty of Alcañices (1297) when King Denis I, son of Afonso III, started developing the kingdom's land.

=== Demise ===
In 1383, Beatrice, princess of Portugal and heir to the throne married John I of Castile. When Ferdinand I (her father) died during the same year, the kingdom entered a period of anarchy called the 1383–1385 Crisis, threatened with a possible annexation by Castile.

This period ended in 1385 with the victory of the Portuguese in the Battle of Aljubarrota, and a new dynasty began with John I, Master of Aviz (illegitimate son of Peter I), thus called the House of Aviz.

== Burgundian monarchs ==
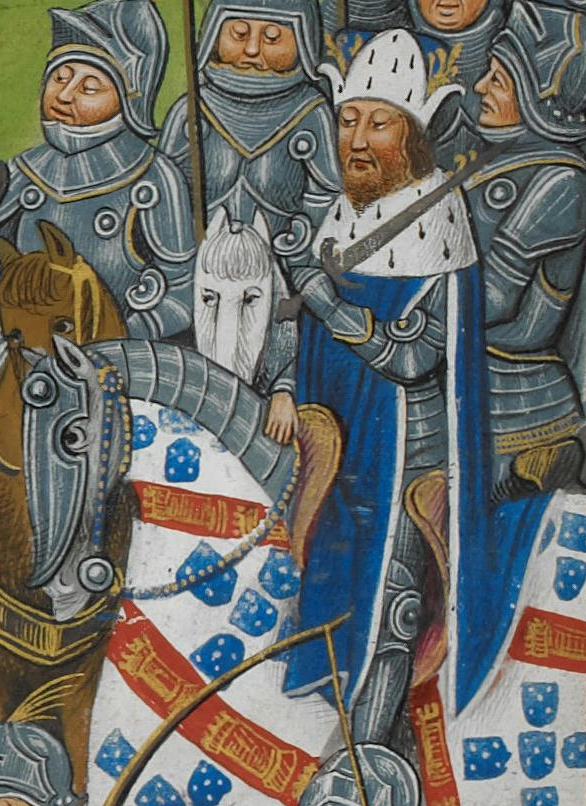
King Fernando I, last Burgundy King of Portugal.

Name	Reign	Notes
Afonso I of Portugal	1139–1185	First King of Portugal
Sancho I of Portugal	1185–1211	King of Silves
Afonso II of Portugal	1211–1223
Sancho II of Portugal	1223–1248
Afonso III of Portugal	1248–1279	First King of the Algarve; Formerly Count of Boulogne
Dinis I of Portugal	1279–1325
Afonso IV of Portugal	1325–1357
Pedro I of Portugal	1357–1367
Fernando I of Portugal	1367–1383	Death triggered the 1383–85 Portuguese Interregnum

== Symbols ==
=== Coats of arms ===
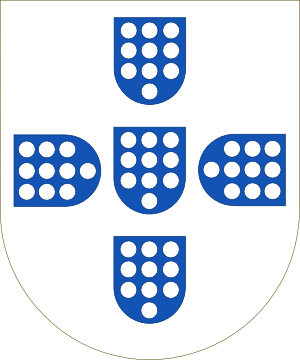
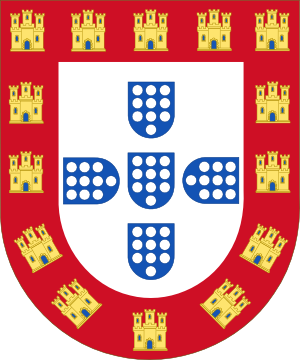
Coat of arms	Title	Tenure	Coat of arms	Title	Tenure	Coat of arms	Title	Tenure
	Rey d' Portugall	1139–1248		King of the Algarves	1249–1383		Count of Boulogne *jure uxoris through Matilda II of Boulougne	1238–1253
	Rey d' Portugall	1248–1383		Count of Flanders *jure uxoris through Joan I of Flanders	1212–1233		Count of Urgell *jure uxoris through Aurembiaix I of Urgell	1229–1236

== Family tree of the Portuguese House of Burgundy ==
Robert I duke of Burgundy; HOUSE OF BURGUNDY
Henry heir apparent
Hugh I duke of Burgundy	Odo I duke of Burgundy	Robert bishop of Langres	Henry; PORTUGUESE HOUSE OF BURGUNDY	Teresa countess of Portugal; HOUSE OF JIMENEZ
Hugh II duke of Burgundy	Afonso I king of Portugal
Odo II duke of Burgundy	(illeg.) Fernando gr. master of Knights Hospitalier	Sancho I king of Portugal
Hugh III duke of Burgundy	Afonso II king of Portugal	Peter I count of Urgell	Ferdinand count of Flanders
Odo III duke of Burgundy	Guigues VI count of Viennois	Sancho II king of Portugal	Afonso III king of Portugal	Fernando lord of Serpa
Hugh IV duke of Burgundy	Guigues VII count of Viennois	Denis king of Portugal	Afonso lord of Portalegre	(illeg.) Martim Afonso Chichorro I
Odo count of Never	John count of Charolais	Robert II duke of Burgundy	John I count of Viennois	Afonso IV king of Portugal	(illeg.) Pedro Afonso count of Barcelos	(illeg.) Afonso Sanches lord of Albuquerque	Afonso lord of Leiria	Martim Afonso Chichorro II
Hugh V duke of Burgundy	Odo IV duke of Burgundy	Odo IV duke of Burgundy	Peter I king of Portugal	João Afonso lord of Albuquerque
Philip I count of Auvergne	Ferdinand I king of Portugal	(illeg.) John Castro duke of Valencia de Campos	(illeg.) Denis lord of Cifuentes	(illeg.) John I king of Portugal; HOUSE OF AVIZ
Philip I duke of Burgundy	Ferdinand lord of Eça

== See also ==
- List of Portuguese monarchs
- House of Aviz
- Portugal in the Middle Ages
- Timeline of Portuguese history

*Royal House* Portuguese House of Burgundy Cadet branch of the House of Burgundy
New title Founding of Kingdom	Ruling House of the Kingdom of Portugal; 1139 – 1383	Succeeded by Portuguese Interregnum; Eventually House of Aviz
