= Sylvester da Cunha =

Indian advertising professional (1930–2023)

- Born: 19 October 1930; Bombay, British India
- Died: 21 June 2023 (aged 92); Mumbai, Maharashtra, India
- Citizenship: British Raj (until 1947); Indian (from 1947)
- Education: Bombay University (B.A.); Princeton University
- Occupations: Advertising professional; theatre personality
- Known for: Creation of the Amul girl campaign
- Spouse: Nisha da Cunha
- Children: 1
- Relatives: Gerson da Cunha (brother); José Gerson da Cunha (uncle)

Sylvester da Cunha (19 October 1930 – 21 June 2023) was an Indian advertising professional and theatre personality. He was most famously known for creating the Utterly Butterly advertising campaign and the Amul girl mascot for the Indian dairy cooperative Amul. He also served as a consultant to multinational agencies including the World Bank, UNICEF, and the International Bank for Reconstruction and Development on various projects linked to food and nutrition.

== Early life ==
Sylvester da Cunha was born on 19 October 1930 into a Bombay Goan family of Portuguese descent. His family was originally from Bardes concelho in Novas Conquistas and later moved to the Mazagaon neighbourhood of Bombay (now Mumbai) where he grew up. His brother Gerson da Cunha was also an advertising professional. His uncle José Gerson da Cunha, physician and historian, had written one of the first historical works documenting the origins of Bombay, somewhat aptly titled, The Origins of Bombay. Da Cunha Sr. was also the family physician of the Aga Khan. Da Cunha lost his father, in 1941, when he was 11.

Da Cunha completed his Bachelor of Arts (honours) in economics from Bombay University and later studied mass communication at Princeton University as a Parvin fellow between 1964 and 1965.

== Career ==
Da Cunha started his advertising career in 1951 at L. A. Stronach Advertising, a British advertising agency. He worked in their London liaison office for three years before returning to India. On his trip back on the boat he was offered a job by John Kurien, a manager with the Birla group's Advertising and Sales Promotions (ASP) agency. At ASP, da Cunha initially handled some of the Birla group's inhouse brands like Hindustan Motors and Century Rayon, before handling accounts including Life Insurance Corporation, Glaxo and Lakmé.

Da Cunha was best known for his creation of the Utterly Butterly campaign for the Indian dairy cooperative Amul, which saw the introduction of the Amul girl. The campaign was created in 1966, by which time da Cunha was ASP's managing director, where he was given the task to create a mascot and help position Amul as a brand among mothers and children. Da Cunha teamed up with illustrator and art director Eustace Fernandes to create the ads.

The ads had a mischievous looking girl in a white dress with red polka-dots and blue hair, poking fun at major celebrities and newsmakers. They were noted for their news topical relevance and tongue-in-cheek wit and humour. It was one of the longest running campaigns in India, and remained active at the time of da Cunha's death. To create the central figure, da Cunha worked with over 712 babies' photographs before zeroing in on a photograph of 10-month-old Shoba Tharoor (later Shoba Tharoor Srinivasan) as the inspiration for the mascot. Tharoor was the younger sister of Indian politician Shashi Tharoor, and went on to become a children's author. The campaign and the mascot was noted to have been in response to the incumbent market leader Polson butter, who had a similar mascot of a girl who was soft and well-mannered. This prompted da Cunha to model the Amul girl as a mischievous girl taking a dig at ongoing current events.

Da Cunha later went on to found his own advertising company Da Cunha Associates in 1969, after spending 14 years at ASP. He brought some of ASP's clients with him to Da Cunha Associates, including Amul. Some of the other major accounts of that time included Britannia biscuits, Lakmé, Nutramul and Tata Tea. Da Cunha handed over creation of Amul's topical advertisements to his son Rahul in 1993. The campaign holds the Guinness World Record for the longest running advertising campaign.

Da Cunha was also involved in English language theatre in India. He was a founding member of the Theatre Group of Bombay. He was among the first to combine Hindi and English language into plays, which was not common at the time. Some of his popular plays included I love Mumbai, It is not funny!, and Topsy-Turvy. Many of his plays including Topsy-Turvy were satirical sketches on everyday life. He also directed and acted in an adaptation of Vijay Tendulkar's Kamala.

In the 1980s and 1990s, da Cunha was also part of various social development initiatives. During this time, he served as a population and nutritional consultant with the Information, Education, and Communication unit of the World Bank, traveling within India, and to various countries including Brazil, Turkey and Zambia. He also served as a consultant to the UNICEF and the International Bank for Reconstruction and Development on food and nutrition projects.

== Personal life ==
Da Cunha was married to Nisha da Cunha, an author and earlier an English professor at St. Xavier's College, Mumbai. The couple had a son, Rahul da Cunha, also an advertising professional; Sylvester's brother, Gerson da Cunha, was also an advertising professional. A 2018 article in the Hindustan Times described da Cunha as someone who "spoke Portuguese better than Konkani, wore suits, had a sprawling 500-year-old home in Arpora village, and even knew what feijoada was".

Da Cunha died in Mumbai on 21 June 2023, at the age of 92.
