= José Gerson da Cunha =

Portuguese physician (1844–1900)

- Born: 2 February 1844; Arpora, Goa, Portuguese India
- Died: 3 August 1900 (aged 56)
- Education: University of Bombay
- Occupations: Physician; indologist; historian; linguisti
- Spouse: Ana Rita da Gama
- Children: 3
- Relatives: Gerson da Cunha (nephew); Sylvester da Cunha (nephew)
- Honours: Order of St. Gregory the Great; Order of Saint James of the Sword; Order of the Crown of Italy

José Gerson da Cunha OCI (2 February 1844 – 3 August 1900) was a Portuguese physician who achieved international renown as an indologist, historian, linguist and numismatist.

== Early life and medical career ==
José Gerson da Cunha was born in Arpora, Bardes on 2 February 1844, the eldest of twelve children to a Portuguese couple, Francisco Caetano da Cunha and Leopoldina Maria Gonçalves. Francisco was an infantry lieutenant in the Portuguese army stationed in Goa who had taken part in the military campaign against the Marathas at Uspa and Rarim in Savantvadi.

Da Cunha did his primary studies and study of humanities in Panjim. He then moved to Bombay and enrolled in the Grant Medical College to pursue his medical studies. While there, da Cunha distinguished himself by winning many prizes. However, he failed to obtain his licentiate in medicine, and instead obtained the first licentiate degree from the University of Bombay in 1864. He moved to London in 1867 to obtain his degree and in the same year, obtained the diplomas of L.R.C.P. Lond. and M.R.C.S Eng. Cunha specialised in obstetrics at Edinburgh and London. He returned to Bombay in 1868, where he soon acquired a large practice.

== Works ==
Da Cunha wrote several papers on obstetrics which attracted much attention at the Medico-Physical Society of Bombay. After an epidemic of dengue in the city, he wrote an essay on dengue entitled Dengue: its history, symptoms and treatment. Besides medicine, Cunha's interest spanned across diverse subjects such as history, archaeology, linguistics, numismatics and Sanskritology (study of Sanskrit). He wrote and distinguished himself more by creating works of historical value on these subjects. Besides papers, he was the author of 20 books on these subjects. His decision to write his works in English gained him greater recognition amongst English readers than those by Goan authors who had chosen to write on these subjects only in Portuguese.

=== History ===
Da Cunha wrote the first book on the history of Bombay, The Origin of Bombay which was published posthumously by the Bombay branch of the Royal Asiatic Society in 1900. His other best known historical works include Memoir on the history of the tooth-relic of Ceylon; with a preliminary essay on Gautama Buddha The life and system of Gautama Buddha (1875), Historical and Archeological Sketch of the Island of Angediva (1875), and The History and Antiquities of Chaul and Bassein (1876).

=== Linguistics ===
Da Cunha was inspired by the Portuguese civil servant Joaquim Heliodoro da Cunha Rivara's efforts to revive Konkani in Goa. In 1881, he wrote a scholarly work on the language entitled The Konkani Language and Literature, wherein he discussed its origin and issues. Using the arguments of the Language theory, he demonstrated that Konkani was an independent language in its own right with its own dialects, such as Kudali, Goadesi and the southern form. Cunha concluded that while Konkani bears close similarities to Marathi, it is quite distinct, though cognate with Marathi, and has a predominance of Sanskrit words and a faint Turanian or Dravidian element. It possesses an elaborate grammar of its own and a rich vocabulary which is derived from various sources (Sanskrit, Persian, Kannada and Portuguese, with all the contributing elements having lost their autonomy in the course of time and becoming so fused together that only a careful analysis can discover their etymology.

Da Cunha was greatly concerned with the increasing corruption of Konkani's purity, as he felt that the incorporation of Portuguese, Persian, Kannada, and Marathi loanwords were distancing the language from its original source, Sanskrit. He further had serious misgivings about the language's future. In The Konkani Language and Literature, he states:

It is only an autonomous country that can preserve its language in a state of purity, and it is to its literature or rather to the learned men of that country is confided the task of rendering its forms classic and unalterable. But Goa has for centuries been swayed by foreign rulers who have insisted on making their own language the official language, or the language of the court, withdrawing, at the same time, all encouragement for the cultivation of the native tongue. Under these circumstances it is no wonder that Konkani has been treated with neglect by the very children of the soil, and has, from the absence of a norm to regulate its forms, dwindled into the state of a jargon, or patois. Add to this internal disorganisation the power and vitality of the neighbouring tongues, and one need not be a prophet to foretell that in the course of a century or two, the Konkani language will be encroached upon by the Marathi from the North, and the Kanarese from the South, a movement that has already begun, when Konkani must succumb to the struggle. This has happened before; and it will happen again: for such is the fate of all weak tongues as also of weak peoples.

=== Numismatics ===
Da Cunha was an avid coin collector. He began collecting coins in 1876 and in addition to his own collection, purchased the collections of James Gibbs and Bhau Dhaji. By 1888, his personal collection had expanded to include over 27,000 pieces of gold, silver, and other metals. The collection of coins catalogued by da Cunha was generally believed to be among the best in the British Empire. This catalogue was published in Bombay in 1888. He wrote a book on numismatics, Indo-Portuguese Numismatics which was published in 1956 by Agencia Geral do Ultramar in Lisbon. This work is generally believed to be one of the few valuable studies in this field.

== Associations ==
In view of his work, da Cunha acquired significant fame as an Orientalist and was invited to International seminars and conferences. In addition to his affiliation with various medical associations in Bombay, his prolific contributions to Indian history and linguistics earned him the fellowship of the Instituto Vasco da Gama in Goa in 1871, and of the Royal Asiatic Society of Bombay in 1873. He received a prize at the Congress of Orientalists in Florence in 1877, and was a prominent figure at the Twelfth Congress held in Rome in 1899. In the latter conference, da Cunha was hailed by the Count Angelo de Gubernatis as the "leading Orientalist of the day". He served as president of the Bombay chapters of the Royal Asiatic Society and the Anthropological Society. He was a Knight of the Order of the Crown of Italy, of the Order of St. Gregory the Great, and of the Order of Saint James of the Sword.

== Personal life ==
Da Cunha was married to Ana Rita da Gama. They had two daughters and a son. His grandson EPW da Costa was a pioneer of opinion polling in India. Da Cunha was a hyperpolyglot, possessing knowledge of Konkani, Marathi, Portuguese, Italian, French, English, German, Pahlavi, Persian, Latin and Sanskrit.

== Bibliography ==
- Dengue, its history, symptoms, and treatment: with observations on the epidemic which prevailed in Bombay during the years 1871–72. Thacker & Co. 1872.
- Historical and Archeological Sketch of the Island of Angediva. Thacker & Co. 1875.
- Memoir on the history of the tooth-relic of Ceylon; with a preliminary essay on the life and system of Gautama Buddha. Thacker & Co. 1875.
- The History and Antiquities of Chaul and Bassein. Thacker & Co. 1876.
- The Sahyadri–khanda of the Skanda purama: a mythological, historical, and geographical account of western India; first edition of the Sanskrit texts with various readings. Thacker & Co. 1877.
- The Konkani language and literature. Bombay Gazzetteer. 1881.
- Contributions to the study of Indo-Portuguese numismatics. Thacker & Co. 1883.
- The origin of Bombay. Royal Asiatic Society. 1900.
- Indo-Portuguese Numismatics. Agência Geral do Ultramar. 1956.
