= Afonso Pires Gato =

13th-century Portuguese knight

- Rico-Homem
- Born: 13th century Kingdom of Portugal
- Died: 13th century Kingdom of Portugal
- Spouse: Urraca Fernandes de Lumiares

Afonso Pires Gato (c. 1210 – ?) was a Portuguese medieval knight, who served in the court of Afonso III of Portugal.

He was the son of Pedro Nunes Velho and Maria de Baião, a remote descendant of Mendo Alão. His wife was Urraca Fernandes de Lumiares, descendant of Sancho Nunes de Barbosa and Sancha Henriques.

== Biography ==
According to records in the Inquiries of 1258, Afonso Pires Gato was raised on an estate near the parish of São Salvador de Covas, now a parish in the municipality of Vila Nova de Cerveira.

It is believed that Afonso Pires, nicknamed "the Cat", served as tenente (royal governor) of Guarda in 1207 and 1241.

According to modern historiography, Afonso Pires Gato was likely a rico-homem (high nobleman) under King Sancho I. With the accession of Afonso II of Portugal, he and his brother Fernão Pires, nicknamed "the Tinhoso", are thought to have sided with the king’s opponents, the Sousa family. Notably, Afonso Pires was the brother-in-law of João Garcia de Sousa, which likely influenced his political alignment.

He returned to the royal court during the reign of Sancho II of Portugal, serving as a witness to the agreement signed on 23 June 1223 between Sancho II, as the new monarch, and his aunts.

Afonso Pires Gato again held the position of tenente of Guarda in 1241, replacing Abril Pires de Lumiares, his wife’s uncle, who had held the post from 1229 to 1241.

=== Estates ===
Afonso Pires Gato’s estates were spread across both banks of the Douro River, with notable holdings in the areas of Penaguião and Paiva, as well as in the lands of Guarda and Seia.

== Family ==
Afonso Pires Gato was the son of Pedro Nunes Velho and Maria Anes de Baião. He married Urraca Fernandes de Lumiares, daughter of Fernão Pires de Lumiares and Urraca Vasques de Bragança, who was the daughter of Vasco Pires de Bragança and Sancha Pires de Baião, with whom he had:

1. Constança Afonso Gato, who married Soeiro Pires de Azevedo, Alcaide of Alenquer and son of Pero Mendes Azevedo.
2. Teresa Afonso Gato, who married Mem Soares de Melo, 1st Lord of Melo.
3. Guiomar Afonso Gato, who married Pero Pais de Alvarenga, Alferes-mor of Afonso I of Portugal.

had an illegitimate son with Maria Gonçalves de Palmedia, whose name was not recorded in the genealogical books, although the extramarital relationship (barregania) was documented.

It is speculated that this illegitimate son was Estêvão Afonso Gato, likely the father of Lourenço Esteves Gato, who became notable as a knight between 1307 and 1308 and later as tax collector (taxador) for the churches of Entre-Douro-e-Minho from 1308 onward.
