= Martim Afonso Chichorro =

Portuguese nobleman (1250–1313)

Martim Afonso Chichorro I
- Nobleman (Rico-homem)
- Born: 1250; Portugal
- Died: 1313 (aged 62–63); Portugal
- Noble family: Portuguese House of Burgundy
- Spouse: Inês Lourenço de Valadares
- Issue: Martim Afonso Chichorro II; Maria Afonso Chichorro; Constança; Margarida; Vasco Afonso de Sousa
- Father: Afonso III of Portugal
- Mother: Madragana
- Occupation: politician

Martim Afonso Chichorro (1250–1313) was a Portuguese nobleman, who served in the Court of Denis of Portugal (his half brother).

== Biography ==
Born in Portugal, Martim was the illegitimate son of Afonso III of Portugal and Madragana. He was married to Inês Lourenço de Valadares (or de Sousa), daughter of Lourenço Soares de Valadares.

Martim Afonso Chichorro held various political positions in the Kingdom of Portugal, including as Governor of the city of Chaves.
