= Martim Lourenço da Cunha =

Portuguese nobleman

- Lord
- Born: 14th-century Portugal
- Died: 14th-century Portugal

Martim Lourenço da Cunha (1300–) was a Portuguese nobleman, 1st Lord of Pombeiro, in the Kingdom of Portugal.

== Biography ==
His parents were Lourenço Martins da Cunha (grandson of Paio Guterres) and Maria de Louzão, daughter of Pedro de Oliveira and Elvira Anes Oliveira. Martim was married to Maria Gonçalves de Briteiros, daughter of Gonçalo Anes de Briteiros and Maria Afonso Chichorro, granddaughter of Afonso III of Portugal.
