= Colin D'Cunha =

Colin D'Cunha was a Canadian doctor. He was Chief Medical Officer of Health for Ontario, Canada during the SARS crisis.

Preceded by N/A	Medical Officer of Health - City of Scarborough –	Succeeded by
Preceded by Monika Naus	Ontario Chief Medical Officer of Health; 1998–2004	Succeeded by Karim Kurji -
