= Vande Mataram (album) =

Studio album by A. R. Rahman
- Released: 12 August 1997
- Recorded: 1997; Panchathan Record Inn (Chennai, India); Sarm West Studios (London, UK); Metropolis Studios (London, UK); Reaktor Studios (London, UK); Sargam Studios (Lahore, Pakistan); XIC Studios (Mumbai, India)
- Genres: World music, Indian pop, Folk rock
- Length: 55:25
- Labels: Columbia/SME Records (1997); CK 68525 (North America); 488709 (international); Varese Sarabande (2009)
- Producers: A. R. Rahman; Kanika Myer Bharat; Bharatbala

Vande Mataram is a 1997 studio album by Indian musician A. R. Rahman. It is Sony Music India's largest-selling non-film album to date. It released on 12 August 1997 by Sony's music labels Columbia Records and SME Records. The timing of the release commemorated the 50th anniversary of India's independence and has been instrumental in instilling a sense of patriotic pride and national unity amongst the people of India. Ever since release, both the album and its title song "Maa Tujhe Salaam" have had a profoundly positive and unifying impact on the nationalistic and patriotic mood of the country.

A critical and commercial hit, the title song from the album is one of India's most popular songs of all time. Sung by Rahman himself, the song has come to represent a feeling of patriotic unity for India and has been performed or played at several national and regional events in the country. The track also holds two Guinness World Records for being the song performed in the most languages. Indian singer Sai "Psychuck" Manapragada performed the track in 265 different languages (individually) and again in 277 languages (with chorus) to achieve this feat twice. Rahman was also issued an Guinness World Record certificate for being the composer of the original song which was ceremoniously presented to Rahman after his concert in Oakland, CA, USA on 12 September 2010.

The album won the 1998 Screen Videocon Award for Best Non-Film Album. It also features "Gurus of Peace" which Rahman recorded with the late Pakistani Qawwali singer Nusrat Fateh Ali Khan who died 4 days after the album's release.

== Background ==
In 1996, when Rahman had gone to Bombay (now Mumbai) to attend the Screen Awards ceremony, he met his childhood friend Bharat Bala. During this meeting both had discussed a proposal for an album to commemorate 50 years of Indian Independence in 1997. In March 1997, the International music label, Sony Music, entered the Indian market in a big way. They were looking to promote Indian artistes internationally. And the first person to be signed up by Sony Music from the Indian sub-continent was A.R.Rahman, on a three-album contract. The financial details of the contract were not disclosed but Industry experts believe it to be the largest of its kind in India. Rahman suggested the idea that he had discussed with Bharat to Sony Music India and was immediately accepted. Called Vande Mataram, it was a tribute to the motherland and featured songs to mark the three colours of the Indian Flag .

== Development ==
Sony asked him to choose from any of its international stars to work with and supposedly even suggested the name of Celine Dion. But Rahman settled, very appropriately, for the Pakistani Sufi music singer Nusrat Fateh Ali Khan and Sting's guitarist Dominic Miller. Rahman had decided that he would definitely work with Nusrat Fateh Ali Khan after he attended his performance in Delhi. Explaining his choice, "I don't want to collaborate with just a name. I must feel something for the person and relate with his work. I've seen several famous names collaborating on songs and albums, but they remain just two names. There's no chemistry. It's like oil and water. They can't come together." He went all the way to Pakistan to record the "Gurus of Peace" number with Khan. This is supposedly the first time that an Indian and Pakistani artiste have come together to create this kind of music. Rahman worked overtime for this prestigious project that his film assignments went behind schedule.

Chaiyya Chaiyya was originally composed for the album. But as it didn't fit it, it was replaced for the film Dil Se..

== Release ==
When the songs from the album were played, pre-release, at the Sony Music conference in Manila, Sony Music executives representing various Sony Music sub-labels reportedly went berserk and clamoured for the international rights of the album. They played the song; pandemonium reigned. The head of Columbia records (a Sony label) said, "It's unbelievable, I want it." The head of Epic records (another Sony label) said, "I don't care, I want it." Says Subramaniam: "It was the hit of the conference."

Amid great hype, the album was released on 12 August 1997, three days before the 50th anniversary of Indian independence. The Indian release had only 7 songs while the international release had two additional songs "Masoom" and "Musafir". Later "Masoom" was released in India in the album Gurus of Peace and "Musafir" in the album MTV Total Mix.

In 2009, The international version of album with 9 songs was re-issued by Varèse Sarabande in North America.

== Reception ==
The album was met with overwhelming responses. Rahman became the first Indian artist of popular music to go international when Vande Mataram was released simultaneously in 28 countries across the world. Rahman himself performed live at Vijay Chowk in New Delhi on August 14, 1997, the eve of the Golden Jubilee of India's independence, to a packed audience that comprised the Prime Minister of India, Inder Kumar Gujral. The album was a big success, selling over 500,000 copies in the first week, and over 1.5 million copies in India during 1997. It also did very well internationally, selling millions worldwide.

Screen India's reviewer said, "A. R. Rahman's tribute to India in its 50th year of independence was a well-synchronised effort. Both, Rahman's music and singing, were appreciated, and the lead track "Maa Tujhe Salaam", with its brilliant orchestration, is a befitting '90s ode to the motherland. Another highlight is Rahman's duet with Ustad Nusrat Fateh Ali Khan, "Gurus of Peace"." Allmusic's Stephen Thomas Erlewine gave the album a rating of 4.5 out of 5 stars, describing it as "a vibrant, exciting album that has the potential to reach beyond the traditional world music fan."

Initially there was some negative criticism against Rahman for using phrases of India's national song "Vande Mataram" in the title track; "Maa Tujhe Salaam". With the immense popularity and widespread appeal for the song from all over India, much of this criticism was ignored. The song "Maa Tujhe Salaam" got repeated airplay in the world music category on radio and television channels across the world."Maa Tujhe Salaam" was also nominated for International Viewer's Choice Award for MTV India in 1998.

"Maa Tujhe Salaam" is commonly used as an anthem by India's national sports teams. It is especially considered iconic for India's national cricket team as cricket is the most popular spectator sport in the country. The song's patriotic theme helps to unite everyone, boost morale, and represent pride in the team and the country. It is often played at matches, celebrations, events, and used in video packages.

== Track listing ==
No.	Title	Lyrics	Performer(s)	Length
1.	"Maa Tujhe Salaam"	Mehboob	A. R. Rahman	6:11
2.	"Revival"	Bankim Chandra Chatterjee	A. R. Rahman	7:40
3.	"Gurus of Peace"	Mehboob, Tim Cody & Dinesh Kapoor	Nusrat Fateh Ali Khan, A. R. Rahman	6:27
4.	"Tauba Tauba"	Mehboob	A. R. Rahman	6:11
5.	"Only You"	Mehboob	A. R. Rahman	5:40
6.	"Missing (Vande Mataram)"		Instrumental	5:11
7.	"Thai Manne Vanakkam" (Tamil version of "Maa Tujhe Salaam")	Vairamuthu	A. R. Rahman	6:11
8.	"Masoom"	Gulzar	A. R. Rahman	6:08
9.	"Musafir"	Tim Kody, Kanika Myer Bharat	A. R. Rahman, Faye	5:43

- The tracks "Maa Tujhe Salaam", "Revival", and "Gurus of Peace" represent the three colours - saffron, white and green respectively - of the national flag.
- "Revival" and "Missing" are both arrangements of Vande Mataram.
- "Musafir" and "Gurus of Peace" were partial reuses of Rahman's earlier film songs, "Ottagathai Kattiko" (from Gentleman) and "Porale Ponnuthayi" (from Karuththamma) respectively.
- "Gurus of Peace" was the only song sung by Nusrat Fateh Ali Khan for Rahman and was one of his final songs as he died soon after the album's release. As a tribute to him, Rahman released an album titled Gurus of Peace in 1998.

== Album credits ==
=== Personnel ===
- A. R. Rahman – vocals
- Pete Lockett – Percussion
- Sivamani – Percussion
- Mark James – Guitar
- Sara Prosser – Oboe
- Ganesh Rajagopalan - Violin
- Srinivasalu - Santoor
- Dominic Miller - Acoustic guitar
- Mahesh Tinaikar - Acoustic guitar
- Keith Peters - Bass guitar
- Appa Rao - Shehnai
- Chris "Snake" Davis - Saxophone
- Janardhanan - Sitar

=== Production ===
- Producers: A. R. Rahman, Kanika Myer Bharat, Bharatbala
- Engineers: H. Sridhar, Paul Wright, Shivakumar
- Mixing: H. Sridhar
- Programming: A. R. Rahman, Yak Bondy

=== Post production ===
- Chetan Desai

=== Design ===
- Art direction: Sunil Mahadik
- Oil on canvas: Thotta Tharani
- Photography: Thejal Patni
- Inlay design: Manjiri Rajopadhye

== Covers ==
Stanford Raagapella, a South Asian fusion a cappella group, has created an acappella version of the song Maa Tujhe Salaam.

Esther Hnamte, a four-year-old girl from Mizoram published a music video cover on Youtube in October 2020. It became a media sensation leading to praising comments from Chief Minister of Mizoram and Prime Minister Narendra Modi. Rahman also tweeted, saying, "When you are showered with cuteness and love."
