= Cunha Porã =

- Municipality
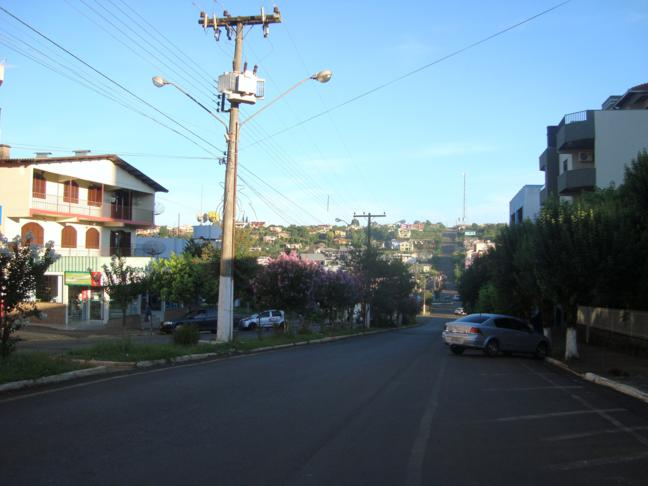

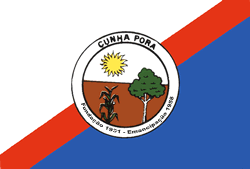
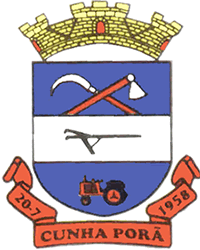
- Flag Coat of arms

- Location in Brazil
- Coordinates: 26°54′S 53°09′W
- Country: Brazil
- Region: South
- State: Santa Catarina
- Mesoregion: Oeste Catarinense

Population (2020)
  - Total: 11,118
- Time zone: UTC -3

Cunha Porã is a municipality in the state of Santa Catarina in the South region of Brazil. It was created in 1958 out of the existing municipality of Palmitos.

== See also ==
- List of municipalities in Santa Catarina
