= Gerson da Cunha =

Indian advertising professional and actor (1929–2022)

- Born: 16 June 1929; Bombay, British India
- Died: 7 January 2022 (aged 92); Mumbai, Maharashtra, India
- Citizenship: British Raj (until 1947); Indian (from 1947)
- Education: St. Xavier's College
- Occupations: Advertising professional; actor; author; social worker
- Spouse: Uma da Cunha
- Relatives: Sylvester da Cunha (brother); José Gerson da Cunha (uncle)
- Honours: Order of Rio Branco (2018)

Gerson da Cunha (16 June 1929 – 7 January 2022) was an Indian advertising professional who was also a stage and film actor, social worker, and author. He headed the Indian market communications agency Lintas and also worked for J. Walter Thompson, and Hindustan Lever in a career spanning 25 years. He worked with UNICEF in Brazil and was awarded the Order of Rio Branco by the government of Brazil in 2018 for his services to that country. Da Cunha acted in English-language plays and movies such as Electric Moon (1992), Cotton Mary (1999), Asoka (2001) and Water (2005), among others.

== Early life ==
Gerson da Cunha was born on 16 June 1929 into a Bombay to Goan Catholic family of Brahmin from Portuguese descent and grew up in the Mazagaon neighborhood of Bombay (now Mumbai). He graduated in science from the University of Bombay studying at St. Xavier's College. He would later describe his college as a 'fussy and priggish Jesuit College'. His uncle was José Gerson da Cunha, physician and historian, who had written one of the first historical works documenting the origins of Bombay, somewhat aptly titled, The Origins of Bombay. Da Cunha Sr. was also the family physician of the Aga Khan.

His younger brother Sylvester da Cunha was also involved in advertising and English theatre.

== Career ==
Da Cunha started his career as a journalist with Press Trust of India and later worked with Reuters. He also worked during this time with All India Radio. After five years in the news industry, he moved to advertising working with the Indian marketing communications agencies J. Walter Thompson, Lintas and later to Hindustan Lever, working for over 25 years in the advertising industry between 1955 and 1980. The last ten of those years were spent heading Lintas.

Nowhere is ever home
but this may be the town
of least effort for me.

Here the idiom is known.

— Gerson da Cunha, Bombay Wallahs (2000)

He was a writer for The Earth Times, a newspaper for the 1992 Earth Summit which remained in publication through 2003. His column in the newspaper was titled View from the South and highlighted the need for legislation in driving environmental actions. He also worked with the United Nations Children's Fund (UNICEF) in Latin America and later at its headquarters in New York City. He worked on social marketing programs focused on nutrition, health, and wellness in the region, including vaccinations in Brazil's favelas and healthy motherhood initiatives in the Central American regions. Da Cunha was awarded the Order of Rio Branco by the government of Brazil in 2018 for his services to that country.

Da Cunha was the founder and CEO of the Mumbai-based NGO and citizens initiative Mumbai First and was also part of its organizing board. He was also active in various other NGOs and citizen groups in Mumbai. He was a trustee of NAGAR and convenor of AGNI (Action for Good Governance and Networking for India). He also worked as an advisor to various Indian union ministries and the National Technology Missions under the Cabinet Secretariat.

Da Cunha had also acted in English-language plays and movies including Electric Moon (1992), Cotton Mary (1999), Asoka (2001) and Water (2005), among others. Some of his notable theater performances included Othello directed by Zul Velani in 1956 and Begum Sumroo directed by Alyque Padamsee. He has also provided the voice-over for the national award-winning non-feature film Jain Temples of India (1963). His poetry anthology, So far, was published by HarperCollins in 2000.

== Personal life ==
Da Cunha was married to Uma, a theater and film critic.

== Death ==
Gerson da Cunha died from a cardiac arrest in Mumbai on 7 January 2022, at the age of 92.

== Works ==
=== Books ===
- So far. HarperCollins (India), 2000. ISBN 81-7223-395-7.

=== Films ===
- Electric Moon (1992)
- Cotton Mary (1999)
- Asoka (2001)
- Water (2005)
- Rangoon (2017)
- Gandhi of the Month (2018)
