= Tiago Carneiro da Cunha =

Brazilian artist

Tiago Carneiro da Cunha (born 1973 in São Paulo, Brazil), is a Brazilian artist.

He is the son of José Mariano Carneiro da Cunha and Manuela Carneiro da Cunha, anthropologists. During his formative years, he took life-drawing classes in the studio of local painter Sergio Sister, drew comics, which were published, when he was 17, in the Brazilian underground comics mag Animal), and worked as a freelance illustrator for Folha de S.Paulo newspaper and DPZ advertising agency.

In his early twenties, after a year studying visual arts at Parsons School, New York, he worked as an assistant to theatre director and visual artist Robert Wilson in several stage productions in Europe and the US. He moved to Barcelona in 1995, where he continued his studies and helped create the XXX collective, with which he presented performances in museums and festivals in Spain and Portugal (Fundació Miró, CCCB, Expo98), and which received the KRTU prize from the Government of Catalunya in 1996.

On his return to Brazil in 1998, he was awarded the Apartes Scholarship, from the Brazilian Ministry of Education's CAPES Institute, for postgraduate studies in Visual Arts at Goldsmiths College London, where he is tutored by artists such as the Chapman Brothers, Liam Gillick, Martin Maloney, Cerith Wyn Evans, Pierre Bismuth, Richard Wentworth and Michael Craig-Martin among others. In collaboration with Eva Bensasson, he organizes the collective exhibition "nonstop opening"(1999), which shows hundreds of young artists in the Acava Studios Gallery in Soho, and which later receives an edition in Lisbon at the Galeria Zé dos Bois (2000, organized by João Pedro Vale, Nuno Ferreira & Vasco Araújo). Also during his stay in London, he works for a year as an assistant to British artist Liam Gillick.

In 2001, he returned to Brazil for an exhibition with Enrico David at the AGORA/Capacete Gallery, Rio de Janeiro, and for his first one-man show at Galeria Fortes Vilaça, São Paulo (2002), which established himself permanently in Rio de Janeiro. In 2006, he has his first one-man show in a London Gallery, at Kate Macgarry Gallery. He participated on a regular basis in group shows at museums and institutions in Brazil and abroad, and his work is part of collections such as the Saatchi Collection UK, Arizona State Art Museum Permanent Collection USA, Thyssen-Bornemissa TBA21 Collection Austria, and Coleção Gilberto Chateaubriand/MAM Rio de Janeiro, amongst others. In early 2009, Tiago Carneiro showed his work at Misako and Rosen Gallery, Tokyo, together with Erika Verzutti; in 2008, he had a solo show at Galeria VPF in Lisbon. He was the resident artist and guest tutor at the University of the Arts, Philadelphia, USA, in the fall of 2009.
