= Manuela Carneiro da Cunha =

Portuguese and Brazilian anthropologist

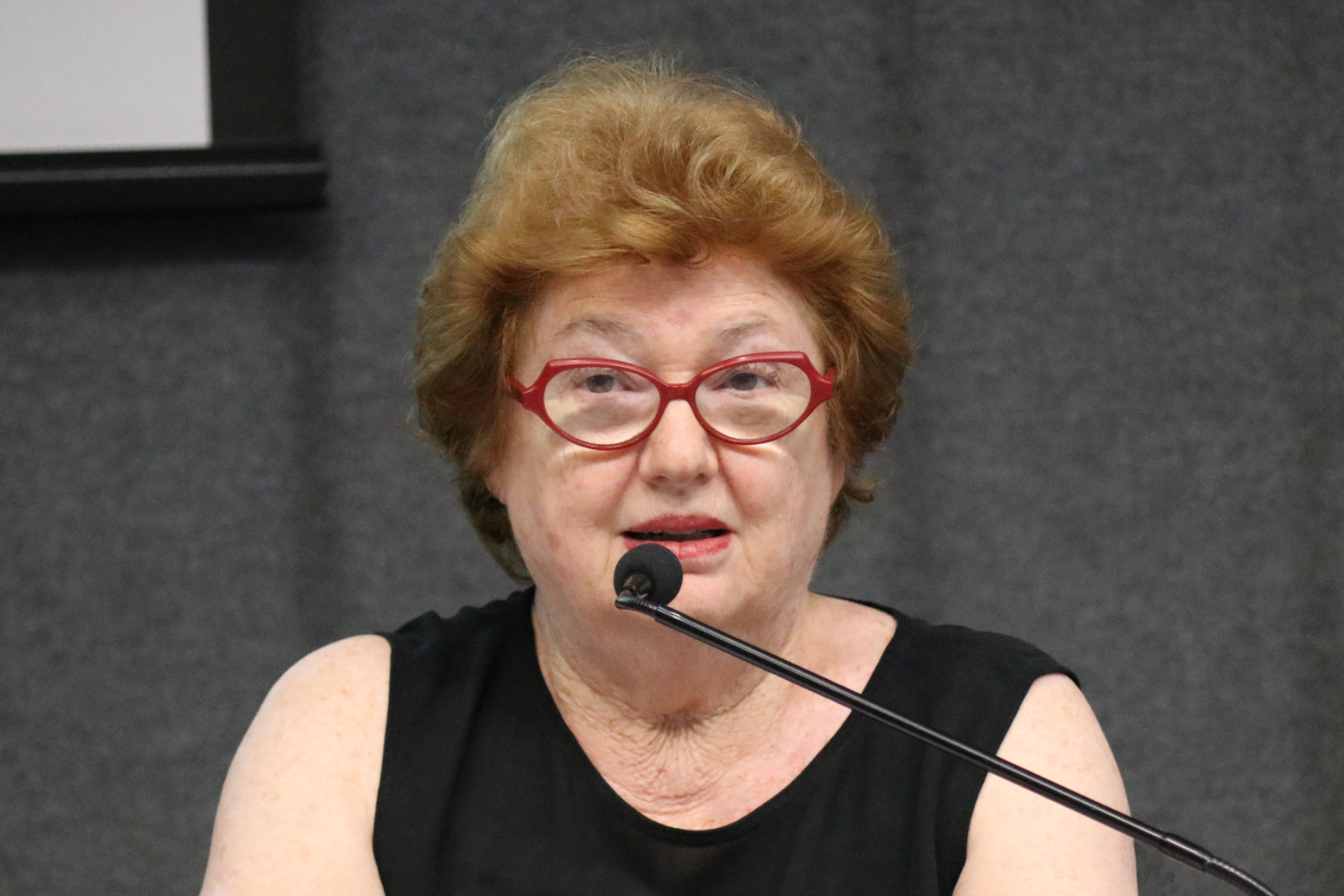
- Born: 1943 (age 81–82); Cascais, Portugal
- Occupation: Anthropologist
- Known for: Studies of indigenous Brazilians
- Notable work: História dos Índios no Brasil; Enciclopédia da Floresta: o Alto Juruá: práticas e conhecimentos das populações
- Spouse(s): (1) Marianno Carneiro da Cunha (d. 1980); (2) Mauro W. B. De Almeida
- Children: Mateus N. Carneiro da Cunha; Tiago Carneiro da Cunha; Luana C. de Almeida (stepdaughter)
- Parent(s): Miklós Ligeti; Fanny Ligeti (b. Schwarz)
- Awards: Legion d´Honneur (France); Chico Mendes Prize (Brazil); Commander of the National Order of Scientific Merit (Brazil)

Manuela Carneiro da Cunha (born 1943) is a Portuguese-Brazilian anthropologist, who is known for her studies of indigenous people in Brazil.

== Early life and training ==
Maria Manuela Ligeti Carneiro da Cunha was born in Cascais, Portugal on 16 July 1943. Her parents were Hungarian Jews who had left Hungary following the rise of Nazi Germany. Her family moved to São Paulo in Brazil when she was 11 years old. After completing high school, she entered the University of São Paulo to study physics but almost immediately moved to Paris, where she graduated in pure mathematics in 1967 at the Paris-Saclay Faculty of Sciences. Between 1967 and 1969 she completed a course in anthropology under the guidance of leading anthropologist Claude Lévi-Strauss. She has written: "I introduced myself as being from Brazil, which visibly did not impress him. I then tried another route, and told him that I was trained in pure mathematics. That was when he was really interested." Returning to Brazil, she obtained a doctorate in social anthropology at the University of Campinas, defending in 1976 the thesis The dead and the others: an analysis of the funerary system and the notion of person among the Krahó Indians. She then went on to do post-doctoral work at the University of Cambridge in the UK and at the Center for Advanced Study in the Behavioral Sciences at Stanford University in California.

== Career ==
Between 1975 and 1984 Cunha was a professor at the State University of Campinas. She became a full professor at the University of São Paulo in 1984, where, after retirement, she remained active. In the Department of Anthropology, she founded the Center for Indigenous History and Indigenism. She also taught at the University of Chicago from 1994 to 2009 and is an emeritus professor at that university. She has been a visiting professor at the École des hautes études en sciences sociales (School for Advanced Studies in the Social Sciences) in Paris, at the Pablo de Olavide University in Seville, Spain and at the Federal University of Rio de Janeiro. She held a chair at the Collège de France in Paris in 2011-2012.

In 1975, she went with her first husband, Marianno Carneiro da Cunha, on a trip to Nigeria, in which she investigated the question of the return to Africa of slaves freed in Brazil. At the end of the 1970s, Cunha became involved in the topic of the indigenous people of Brazil. She was a co-founder of the São Paulo Pro-Indian Commission, which she chaired from 1979 to 1981. She is a member of the Brazilian Academy of Sciences and of The World Academy of Sciences. Between 1986 and 1988 she was president of the Brazilian Association of Anthropology. She played an important role for the Brazilian Constituent Assembly (1988) in the elaboration of Articles 231 and 232 of the Federal Constitution, which guarantee the rights of indigenous peoples.

Cunha was part of the International Advisory Group (IAG) of the Pilot Programme to Conserve the Brazilian Rain Forest (PPG-7), which was launched in 1992 and, in 2002, she published, together with her second husband, Mauro Almeida, the 700-page Encyclopedia of the Forest. In 2014 she was appointed by the Brazilian government to be part of the Inter-governmental Platform for Biodiversity and Ecosystem Services (IPBES) and she was a member of the IPBES Task Force on Indigenous Peoples and Local Communities (2014-2019). She has been a member, since 2018, of the Advisory Council of the National Institute of Historic and Artistic Heritage (IPHAN).

== Publications ==
Cunha has been a prolific publisher of books and papers in her technical area, covering the ethnology, history and rights of Brazilian Indians, African slavery in Brazil, ethnicity, traditional knowledge and anthropological theory. Her publications include:

- Os Mortos e os outros. São Paulo. Hucitec, 1978
- Antropologia do Brasil: mito, história, etnicidade. São Paulo. Brasiliense, 1986
- Negros, estrangeiros: os escravos libertos e sua volta à África. São Paulo. Brasiliense. 1985.
- Direito dos Índios. São Paulo. Brasiliense. 1987
- História dos Índios no Brasil. São Paulo. Companhia das Letras, 1992.
- Legislacao Indigenista No Século XIX: Uma Compilação, 1808-1889. 1992.
- Indigenous People, Traditional People, and Conservation in the Amazon. Daedalus, vol. 129, no. 2, 2000, pp. 315–338. (with Mauro W. B. De Almeida).
- Enciclopédia da Floresta: o Alto Juruá: práticas e conhecimentos das populações. São Paulo. Cia. das Letras. (with Mauro Almeida). 2002.
- Cultura com aspas e outros ensaios de antropologia,2009.
- Tastevin, Parrissier, 2009.
- Índios no Brasil - História, direitos e cidadania, 2013.
- Políticas Culturais e Povos Indígenas, 2014.
- A expulsão de ribeirinhos em Belo Monte: relatório da SBPC. São Paulo: SBPC, 2017 (with S. Magalhães)
- Direitos dos povos indígenas em disputa, 2018. (with S. Barbosa).

== Awards and honours ==
Cunha has received numerous recognitions of her achievements. Some of these are:

- Gilberto Velho Prize of Excellence for Anthropology (ANPOCS - Associação Nacional de Pós-Graduação e Pesquisa em Ciências Sociais). 2018
- Legion d´Honneur, France. 2012
- Sérgio Buarque de Holanda Prize, National Library of Brazil. 2010
- Order of Scientific Merit – Grand Cross, from the Brazilian Academy of Sciences. 2010
- Chico Mendes Prize, from Acre State, Brazil. 2007
- Roquette-Pinto medal, from the Brazilian Anthropological Association. 2003
- Commander of the National Order of Scientific Merit, from the Brazilian government. 2002
- Medaille de Vermeil, Académie Française. 1991
