= Madragana =

Algarvian mistress to king Afonso III of Portugal

Madragana Bat Aloandro, later Maior or Mór Afonso (born c. 1230, Faro, Algarve, Portugal), was a woman from the Algarve known as a mistress to king Afonso III of Portugal, in the 13th century, when he ended the Reconquista in Portugal by taking Faro in 1249. Faro was at that time the last part of the Kingdom of the Algarve still in Muslim hands, and there her father was the Qadi.

== Christening ==
She was christened in time, receiving her new name as Maior Afonso, or Mor Afonso, Mor being short for Maior, a common female name in medieval Portuguese. Afonso was given her in baptism as her new patronymic, meaning "the daughter of" Afonso - and that suggests that her elderly royal lover was also her godfather, that she took his spiritual "fatherhood" when christened. Her father's name was Aloandro Ben Bekar (also known in Portuguese as Aloandro or Aldroando Gil after his christening).

In ancient Portuguese chronicles, Madragana was also referred to as Mouroana, Mouroana Gil, and Madraganil – all of which are Christian names.

== Ethnicity ==
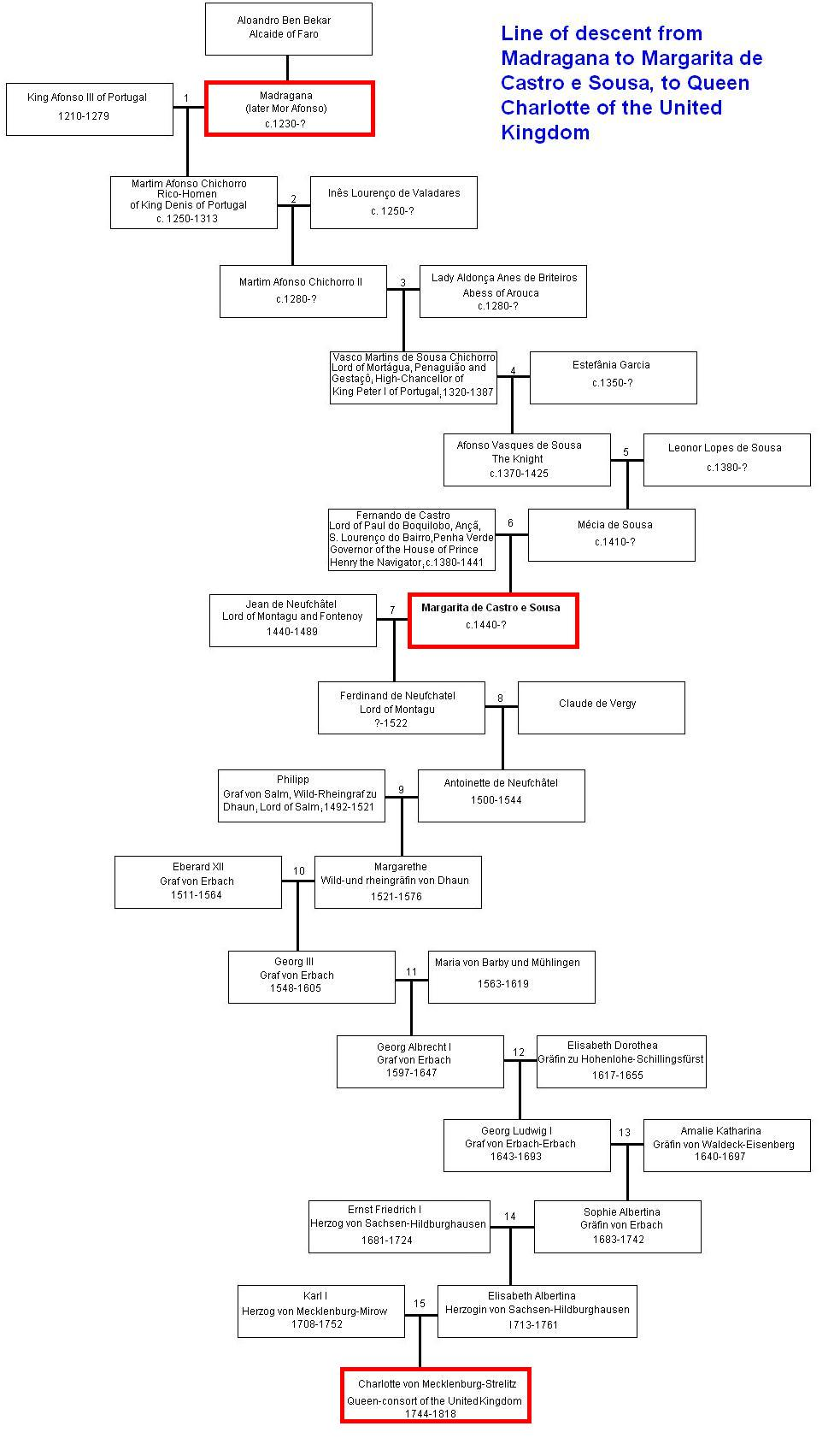
Madragana as ancestress of Charlotte of Mecklenburg-Strelitz, wife of king George III of Great Britain

There is some controversy regarding her ethnicity. Duarte Nunes de Leão, a Portuguese royal chronicler of the 16th century, said that Madragana was a Moor. That was disputed in the 18th century by António Caetano de Sousa. She was probably a Mozarab of Iberian heritage. Nonetheless, this supposed Moorish connection gave rise to a claim by Mario de Valdes y Cocom that the British royal family had African ancestry via the 15-generation descent of Charlotte of Mecklenburg-Strelitz, wife of George III of the United Kingdom, from Madragana, giving Charlotte what the proponent described as a "conspicuously Negroid" appearance. However, it is far from clear that Madragana's family was of recent African origin, nor is it likely that, even were she North African, Madragana's negligible contribution to Charlotte's genetic makeup would have caused the Queen alone, among all of Madgarana's descendants, this number of generations removed, to display distinctive Sub-Saharan African features. She also supposedly had Jewish ancestry.

Madragana bore Afonso two known children:

- Martim Afonso Chichorro (c. 1250 – after 1313), married to Inês Lourenço de Sousa (or Inês Lourenço de Valadares) (born c. 1250).
- Urraca Afonso (born c. 1260), married twice: 1st in 1265 to Pedro Anes Gago de Riba Vizela (c. 1240–1286); 2nd c. 1275 to João Mendes de Briteiros (born c. 1250).

When passion with the King waned, Madragana was married to Fernão Rei. They had at least one daughter, Sancha Fernandes. Note that Rei means 'king', in Portuguese, and so Fernão Rei is believed to originally have been a servant of the king (Fernão do Rei, Ferdinand of the King).
