= Juan Alonso Pimentel de Herrera =

Don Juan Alonso Pimentel de Herrera Grandee of Spain 5th Duke of Benavente 8th Count of Mayorga 3rd Count of Villalón
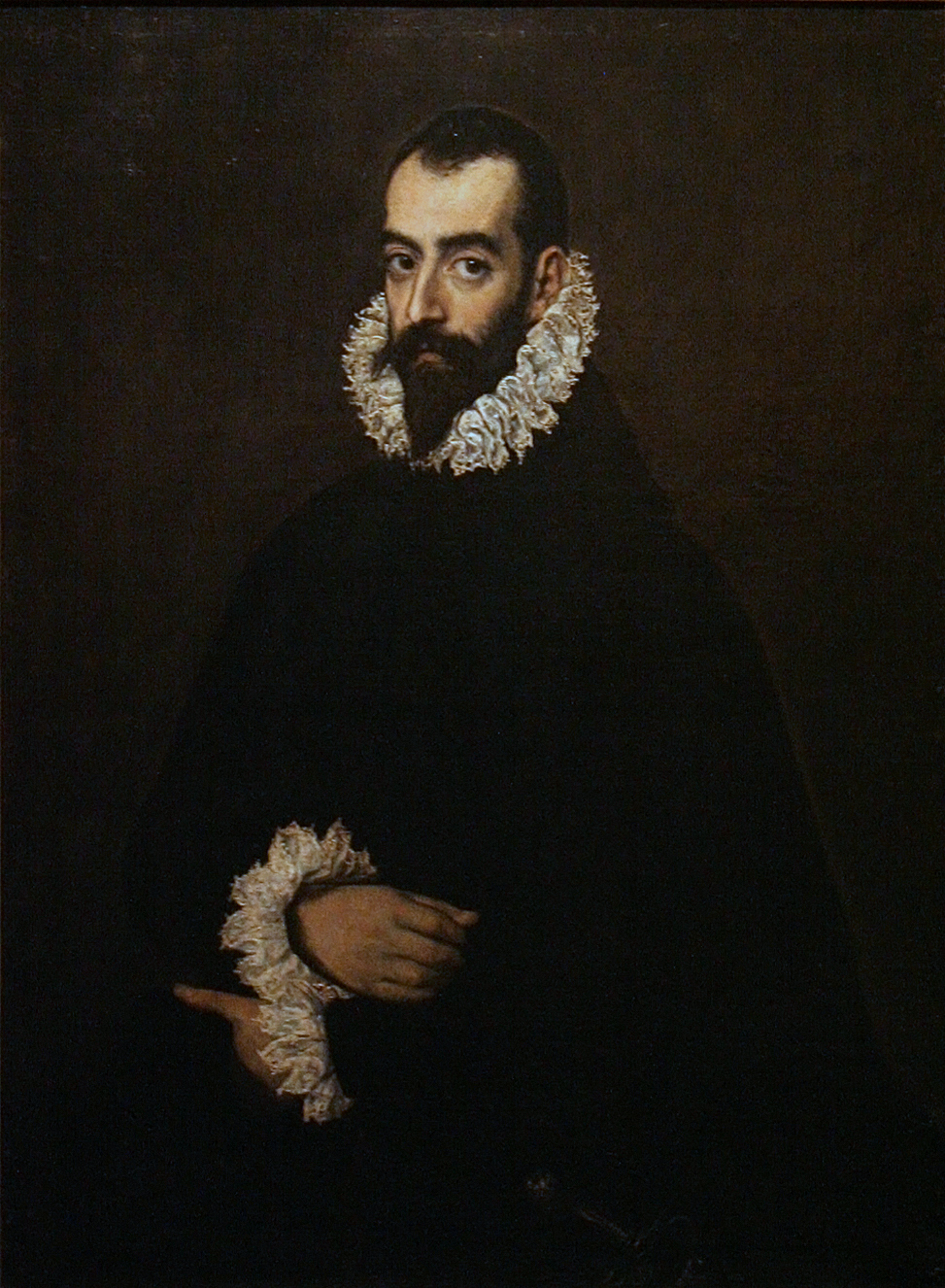
- Portrait of Juan Alfonso de Pimentel y Herrera, by El Greco, between 1597 and 1603

Viceroy of Naples
- In office 1603–1610
- Preceded by: The Count of Lemos
- Succeeded by: The Count of Lemos

Viceroy of Valencia
- In office 1598–1602
- Preceded by: The Duke of Lerma
- Succeeded by: The Archbishop of Valencia

Personal details
- Born: 29 June 1553 Villalón
- Died: 7 November 1621 (aged 68) Madrid
- Spouse(s): Catalina de Quiñones Vigil de Quiñones (m. 1569; died 1574) Mencía de Zúñiga y Requeséns (after 1582)
- Children: With Catalina de Quiñones: • Antonio Alonso Pimentel y Quiñones • María Pimentel y Quiñones; With Mencía de Zúñiga: • Domingo Pimentel Zúñiga • Juan Pimentel y Zúñiga • Gerónimo Pimentel y Zúñiga; With María Gallega: • Enrique Pimentel
- Parent(s): Antonio Alonso Pimentel y Herrera de Velasco; María Luisa Enríquez y Téllez-Girón

Juan Alonso Pimentel de Herrera (baptised 29 June 1553 – 7 November 1621) was a Knight of the Order of Santiago, Grandee of Spain, 5th Duke of Benavente, 8th Count of Mayorga, 3rd Count of Villalón, President of the Council of Italy, 15th Viceroy of Valencia and 25th Viceroy of Naples.

== Early life ==
Juan Alonso was baptised on 29 June 1553 on Villalón. He was the second son of Antonio Alonso Pimentel y Herrera de Velasco, 3rd Duke of Benavente and María Luisa Enríquez y Téllez-Girón, daughter of Fernando Enríquez de Velasco, 5th Admiral of Castile. His elder brother was Louis Pimentel de Herrera, 4th Duke of Benavente.

== Career ==
When his brother Louis died without issue in 1576, he succeeded him as 5th Duke.

During the time of Kings Philip II and Philip III, the Duke was an influential politician and military man. He had experience in the defense of the Spanish coasts and territories, and had supported unity with Portugal in 1580 with 8,000 infantry and 600 cavalry. He also participated in the Enterprise of England in 1588 and helped the Monarch financially.

Between 1598 and 1602, he was Viceroy of Valencia, until he was appointed Viceroy of Naples between 1603 and 1610.

In July 1610, Juan Alonso Pimentel returned to Madrid. He remained in power as a State Councillor and, in 1618, as President of the Council of Italy. He was also Governor of the Kingdoms in the absence of Philip III, when he travelled to Portugal in 1619. After the death of the King, whom he assisted in his final hours, he became Queen Isabel's Chief steward in April 1621. However, he was not able to enjoy this new favour for long, as he died in Madrid on 8 November of that same year.

== Personal life ==
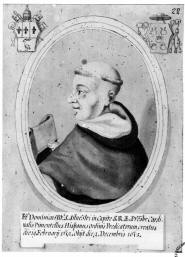
Portrait of his son, Cardinal Domingo Pimentel y Zúñiga

In 1569 he married Catalina de Quiñones Vigil de Quiñones (c. 1547–1574), 6th Countess of Luna. Before her death in 1574, they were the parents of two children:

- Don Antonio Alonso Pimentel y Quiñones, 6th Duke of Benavente (1570–1633), who married Countess María Ponce de León, a daughter of Rodrigo Ponce de Leon, 3rd Duke of Arcos, and Teresa de Zúñiga y Mendoza.
- Doña María Pimentel y Quiñones, who married Pedro Fajardo y Fernández de Córdoba, 2nd Marquis of Molina, 3rd Marquis of los Vélez.

After the death of his first wife, he married his cousin Mencía de Zúñiga y Requeséns in 1582. Mencía was a daughter of Gerónima Esterlich y Gralla and Luis de Requesens y Zúñiga, Governor of the Duchy of Milan from 1572 to 1573 and Governor of the Spanish Netherlands from 1573 to 1576. Together, they had 11 children, including:

- Don Pedro Pimentel y Zúñiga (b. 1582)
- Don Fernando Pimentel y Zúñiga (b. 1582)
- Don Domingo Pimentel y Zúñiga (1585–1653), a Cardinal who was Archbishop of Seville from 1649 to 1653.
- Don Manuel Pimentel y Zúñiga (b. c. 1590), who married Joana Forjaz Pereira, 6th Count of Feira, a daughter of João Pereira Forjaz, 5th Count of Feira.
- Don Juan Pimentel y Zúñiga, 1st Marquess of Villar de Grajanejos (b. c. 1595), who married Antonia Fernández de Córdoba, 5th Countess of Alcaudete, a granddaughter of Alonso de Córdoba, 2nd Count of Alcaudete.
- Doña Mencía Pimentel y Zúñiga (b. c. 1600), who married Fernando Álvarez de Toledo Portugal, 5th Count of Oropesa.
- Don Rodrigo Pimentel y Zúñiga, Knight of the Order of Alcántara.
- Don Alonso Pimentel y Zúñiga, Knight of the Order of Santiago.
- Don Diego Pimentel y Zúñiga, Knight of the Order of Alcántara who was Commander of Mayorga, Captain General of Naples.
- Don García Pimentel y Zúñiga, who married Octavia Torniel.
- Don Gerónimo Pimentel y Zúñiga, 1st Marquess of Bayona (b. 1631), who served as Viceroy of Sardinia from 1626 to 1631; he married María Eugenia de Bazán y Manrique de Lara, 4th Marchioness of Santa Cruz, and, after her death, Clara Lucadelli.

Juan Alonso also had an illegitimate son with María Gallega:

- Enrique Pimentel (1576–1653), who was Bishop of Valladolid from 1619 to 1623 and Bishop of Cuenca from 1623 to 1653.

He died in Madrid on 7 November 1621.

=== Descendants ===
Through his daughter Mencía, he was a grandfather of Duarte Fernando Álvarez de Toledo (c. 1620–1671), 7th Count of Oropesa, 6th Count of Deleytosa, 3rd Marquess of Frechilla and Villarramiel, 3rd Marquess of Jarandilla, who served as Viceroy of Navarre, of Valencia, of Sardinia, President of the Council of the Military Orders and of the Council of Italy and as the Spanish Ambassador to the Holy See.

Government offices
Preceded by The Duke of Lerma	Viceroy of Valencia; 1598–1602	Succeeded by The Archbishop of Valencia
Preceded by The Count of Lemos	Viceroy of Naples; 1603–1610	Succeeded by The Count of Lemos
Spanish nobility
Preceded by Louis Pimentel de Herrera	Duke of Benavente; 1576–1621	Succeeded by Antonio Alonso Pimentel y Quiñones
