= Antonio Alonso Pimentel, 6th Duke of Benavente =

Spanish aristocrat (1570-1633)

Don Antonio Alonso Pimentel y Quiñones, 6th Duke of Benavente (1570–1633), Grandee of Spain, 9th Count of Benavente, 7th Count of Luna, 9th Count of Mayorga, and 4th Count of Villalón, was a Spanish aristocrat.

== Early life ==
Antonio Alonso was born in Benavente, Zamora, Spain. He was the eldest son of Juan Alonso Pimentel de Herrera, 5th Duke of Benavente, and his first wife, Catalina de Quiñones Vigil de Quiñones, 6th Countess of Luna (c. 1547–1574). From his parents' marriage, he had a sister, Doña María Pimentel y Quiñones (who married Pedro Fajardo y Fernández de Córdoba, 2nd Marquis of Molina, 3rd Marquis of los Vélez). After the death of his mother in 1574, his father married Mencía de Zúñiga y Requeséns (a daughter of Luis de Requesens y Zúñiga, the Governor of the Duchy of Milan and Governor of the Spanish Netherlands), with whom he had another eleven children, including Cardinal Domingo Pimentel Zúñiga, Juan Pimentel y Zúñiga, 1st Marquess of Villar de Grajanejos, and Gerónimo Pimentel y Zúñiga, 1st Marquess of Bayona.

His father was the second son of Antonio Alonso Pimentel y Herrera de Velasco, 3rd Duke of Benavente and María Luisa Enríquez y Téllez-Girón (a daughter of Fernando Enríquez de Velasco, 5th Admiral of Castile). His father succeeded to the dukedom upon the death of his elder brother, Louis Pimentel de Herrera, 4th Duke of Benavente.

== Career ==
Upon the death of his mother, he succeeded as the 7th Count of Luna. Upon the death of his father in 1621, he succeeded as the 6th Duke of Benavente, 9th Count of Benavente, 9th Count of Mayorga, and 4th Count of Villalón. The ducal title had been conferred on his family in January 1473 conferred by King Henry IV of Castile.

== Personal life ==
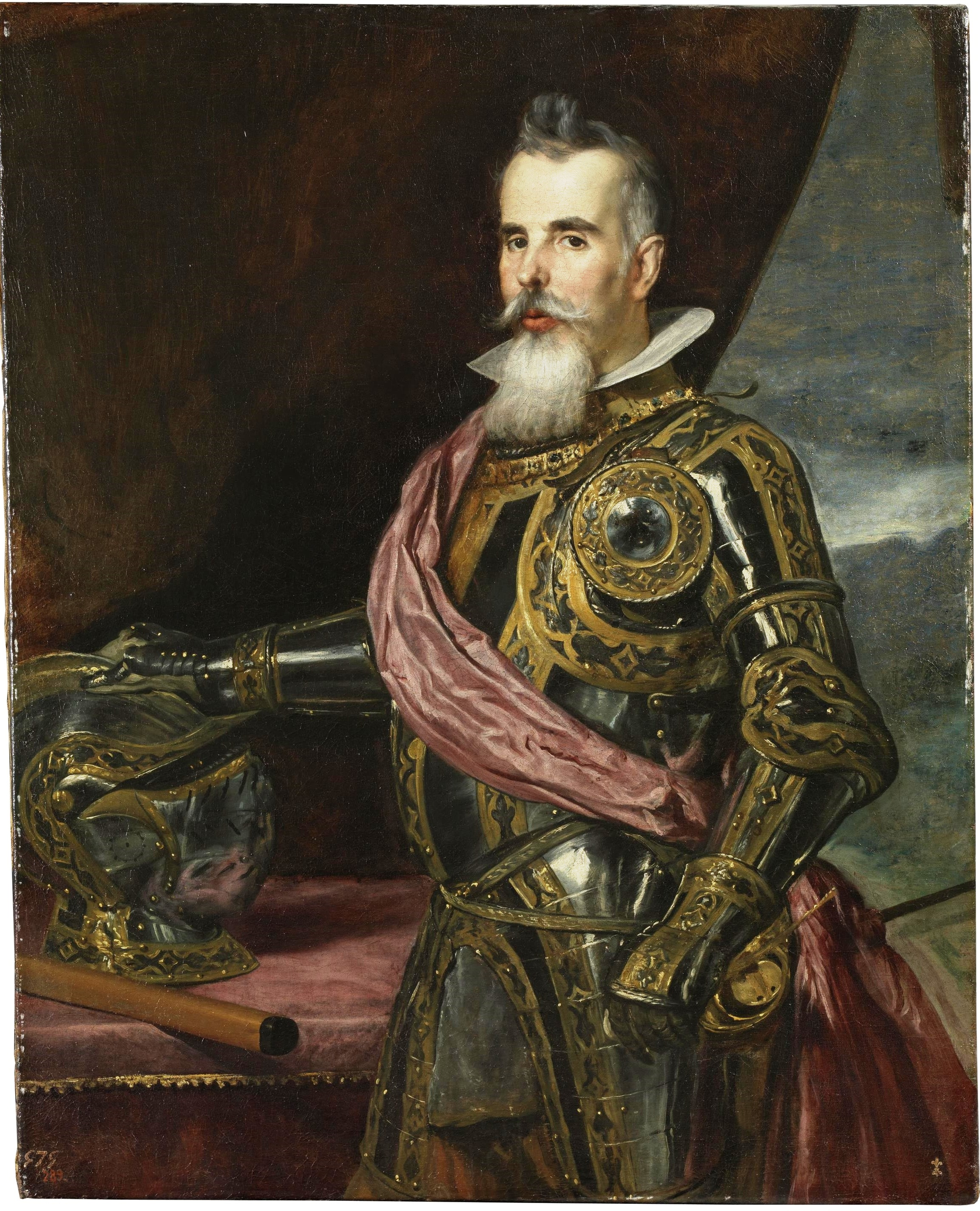
Portrait of his son, Juan Francisco Pimentel, 7th Duke of Benavente

Antonio Alonso married Countess María Ponce de León (1572–1618), a daughter of Rodrigo Ponce de Leon, 3rd Duke of Arcos, and Teresa de Zúñiga y Mendoza. Together, they were the parents of:

- Don Juan Francisco Alonso Pimentel y Ponce de León, 7th Duke of Benavente (1584–1652), who married his cousin, Mencia de Zúñiga y Requesens, daughter of Luis Fajardo y Requesens, 4th Marquis de los Vélez, in 1614. After her death, he married Antonia de Mendoza y Orense, a daughter of Antonio Gómez Manrique de Mendoza, 5th Count of Castrogeriz, in 1648.
- Doña Teresa Pimentel y Ponce de León (1596–1689), who married Antonio Fernández de Córdoba y Rojas, 7th Duke of Sessa.
- Doña Maríañ Pimentel y Ponce de León (b. 1600)
- Doña Magdalena Francisca Josepa Pimentel y Ponce de León (b. 1613)
- Don Claudio Pimentel y Ponce de León, who married Leonor Juana de Ibarra y Cardona, 2nd Marchioness of Taracena.

Antonio Alonso died in 1633 and was succeeded by his eldest son, Juan Francisco Alonso.

Spanish nobility
Preceded by Juan Alonso Pimentel de Herrera	Duke of Benavente; 1621–1633	Succeeded by Juan Francisco Alonso Pimentel y Ponce de León
