= Juan Francisco Pimentel, 7th Duke of Benavente =

Spanish noble (1584-1652)

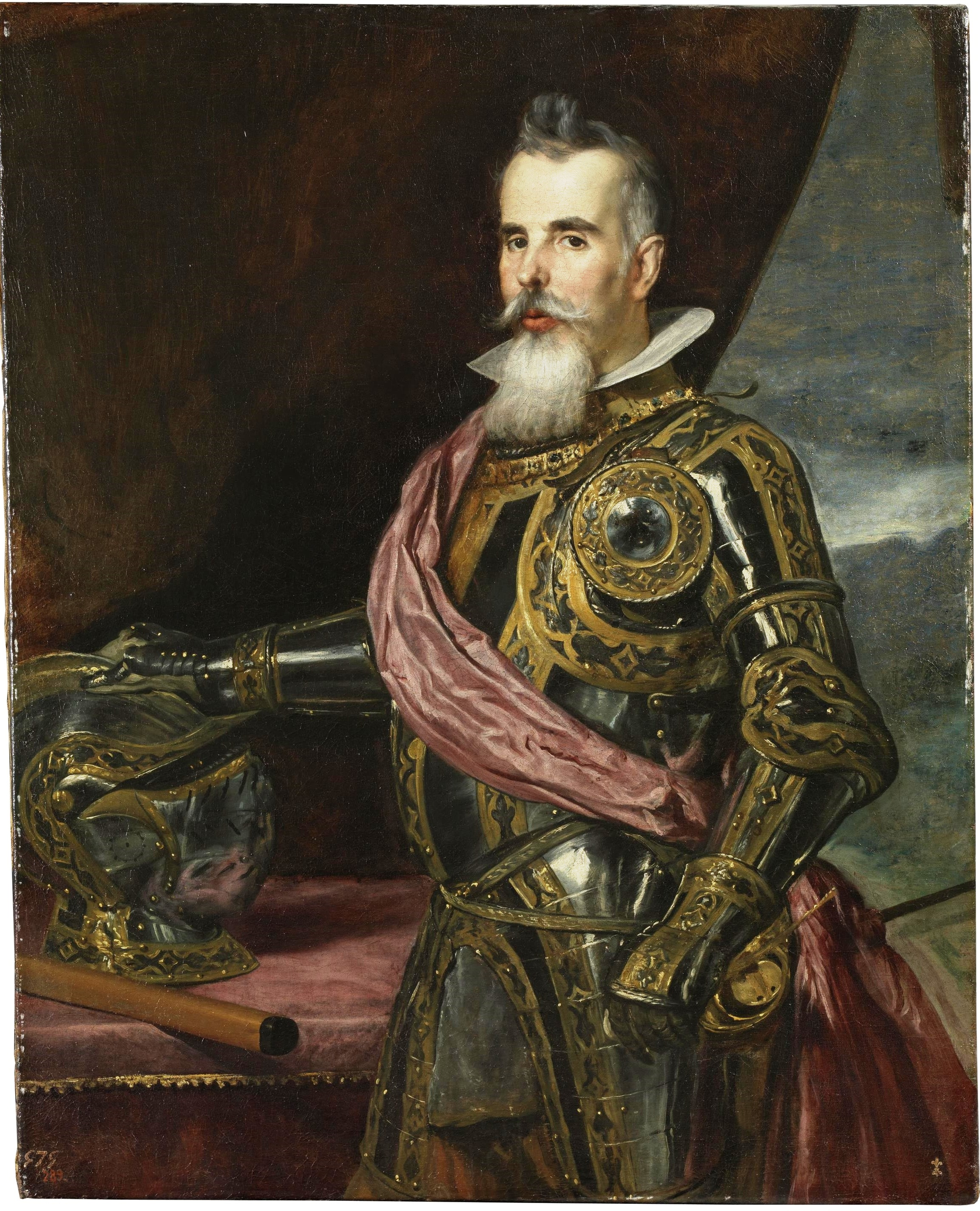
Juan Francisco Pimentel, 7th Duke of Benavente, deceased 1652, by Diego Velázquez, 1648. He is wearing the collar of a Knight of the Order of the Golden Fleece, awarded 1648, number 421, hence, it was painted by Diego Velázquez before his second trip to purchase paints for King Philip IV in Italy. Oil on canvas. 109 × 88 cm, Museo del Prado, Madrid, Spain.

Juan Francisco Alonso Pimentel y Ponce de León, 7th Duke of Benavente (1584 – 1652) was a seventeenth-century Spanish noble, a Knight of the Order of the Golden Fleece in 1648, number 421, 10th Count and 7th Duke of Benavente, 10th Count of Mayorga, 8th Count of Comarca de Luna.

== Early life ==
He was the eldest son of six children of Antonio Alonso Pimentel, 6th Duke of Benavente (d. 1633), and María Ponce de León, (1572–1618), a daughter of Rodrigo Ponce de León, 3rd Duke of Arcos and the niece of the Rodrigo Ponce de León, 4th Duke of Arcos. His name was modified to Pimentel de Herrera or Pimentel Herrera because the 5th Duke, Juan Alonso, died in 1621 and his eldest brother, the 4th Duke, Luis Alonso, no issue, died in 1576. They described themselves with the "Pimentel Herrera" or "Pimentel de Herrera" name, to stress their connection with a branch of the powerful and wide Enriquez family.

== Career ==
Upon the death of his father in 1633, he became the 7th Duke of Benavente, 10th Count and 7th Duke of Benavente, 10th Count of Mayorga, 8th Count of Comarca de Luna. His ducal title dated from January 1473 when it was conferred on his ancestor by King Henry IV of Castile.

He was made a Knight of the Order of the Golden Fleece in 1648, number 421.

== Personal life ==
His first marriage in 1614 was to his cousin, Mencia de Zúñiga y Requesens (1592–1638), daughter of Luis Fajardo y Requesens, 4th Marquis de los Vélez. Together, they had five children, including:

- Don Antonio Alonso Pimentel, 8th Duke of Benavente (1615–1677), who married Isabel Francisca de Benavides, 3rd Marchioness of Jabalquinto, in 1637.
- Doña Teresa Pimentel, who married Juan Alonso de Guzmán y Fuentes Guzmán Lugo, 3rd Marquess of Fuentes.
- Don José Pimentel y Requesens, Capitán General of Old Castile; he married Francisca Dávila y Zúñiga, 4th Marchioness of Mirabel.
- Don Diego Alfonso Pimentel (d. 1624), General of the Galeras of Naples; he married Magdalena de Guzmán y Zúñiga, 3rd Countess of Villaverde.
- Doña María Pimentel, who married, as his third wife, the Viceroy of Naples, Antonio Pedro Sancho Dávila y Osorio, 10th Marquess of Astorga, the eldest son of Antonio Sancho Davila, Marquis of Velada, Governor of the Duchy of Milan.
- Don Manuel Pimentel Requeséns

His second marriage was in 1648, to Antonia de Mendoza y Orense, daughter of Antonio Gómez Manrique de Mendoza, 5th Count of Castrogeriz.

Upon his death in 1652, he was succeeded by his eldest surviving son, Antonio.

Spanish nobility
Preceded by Antonio Alonso Pimentel y Quiñones	Duke of Benavente; 1633–1652	Succeeded by Antonio Alonso Pimentel y Herrera Zúñiga
