= Domingo Pimentel Zúñiga =

Spanish Cardinal and politician

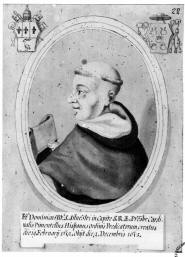
Portrait of Cardinal Domingo Pimentel

Domingo Pimentel de Zúñiga O.P. (Segovia, 3 October 1585 - Rome, 2 December 1653), was a Spanish Cardinal and politician.

== Biography ==
He was the second son of Juan Alonso Pimentel de Herrera, Count of Benavente and his second wife Mencía de Zúñiga y Requesens. He studied at the University of Salamanca and joined the Order of Alcántara, of which he would be Commander of Mayorga. Having professed in the Dominican Order at the Monastery of Santa Cruz la Real in Segovia, he was a teacher at the Colegio de San Gregorio in Valladolid.

In 1630, Philip IV appointed him to the Bishopric of Osma, which he took possession of the following year. Two years later he was promoted to the diocese of Málaga, but before occupying it he was appointed to the Bishopric of Córdoba.
Before taking possession of this, he was entrusted with a diplomatic mission in which he represented the King of Spain, together with the jurist Juan Chumacero Carrillo y Sotomayor, in the negotiations between Spain and the Holy See. They dealt with issues relating to Papal rights and Royal patronage, that is, the difficult jurisdictional balance between the Papacy, local churches and the King, in fiscal, legal and even political matters within the Spanish Monarchy. At that time no agreement was reached, which was only obtained the following century in the Concordat of 1753.

Back in Spain, in 1649 he was promoted to Archbishop of Seville. He was named Cardinal by Pope Innocent X in the consistory of 19 February 1652. He died the following year in Rome, and was buried in the church of Santa Maria sopra Minerva in that city.

Catholic Church titles
Preceded by Alsono Martín de Zuñiga	Bishop of Osma; 1630–1633	Succeeded by Francisco Villafañe
Preceded by Jerónimo Ruiz Camargo	Bishop of Córdoba; 1633–1649	Succeeded by Pedro Tapia
Preceded by Agustín de Spínola Basadone	Archbishop of Seville; 1649–1653	Succeeded by Pedro Tapia
Preceded by Girolamo Colonna	Cardinal Priest of San Silvestro in Capite; June - December 1653	Succeeded by Carlo Rossetti
