= Juan Tomas Enriquez de Cabrera, 7th Duke of Medina de Rioseco =

Spanish noble and military leader

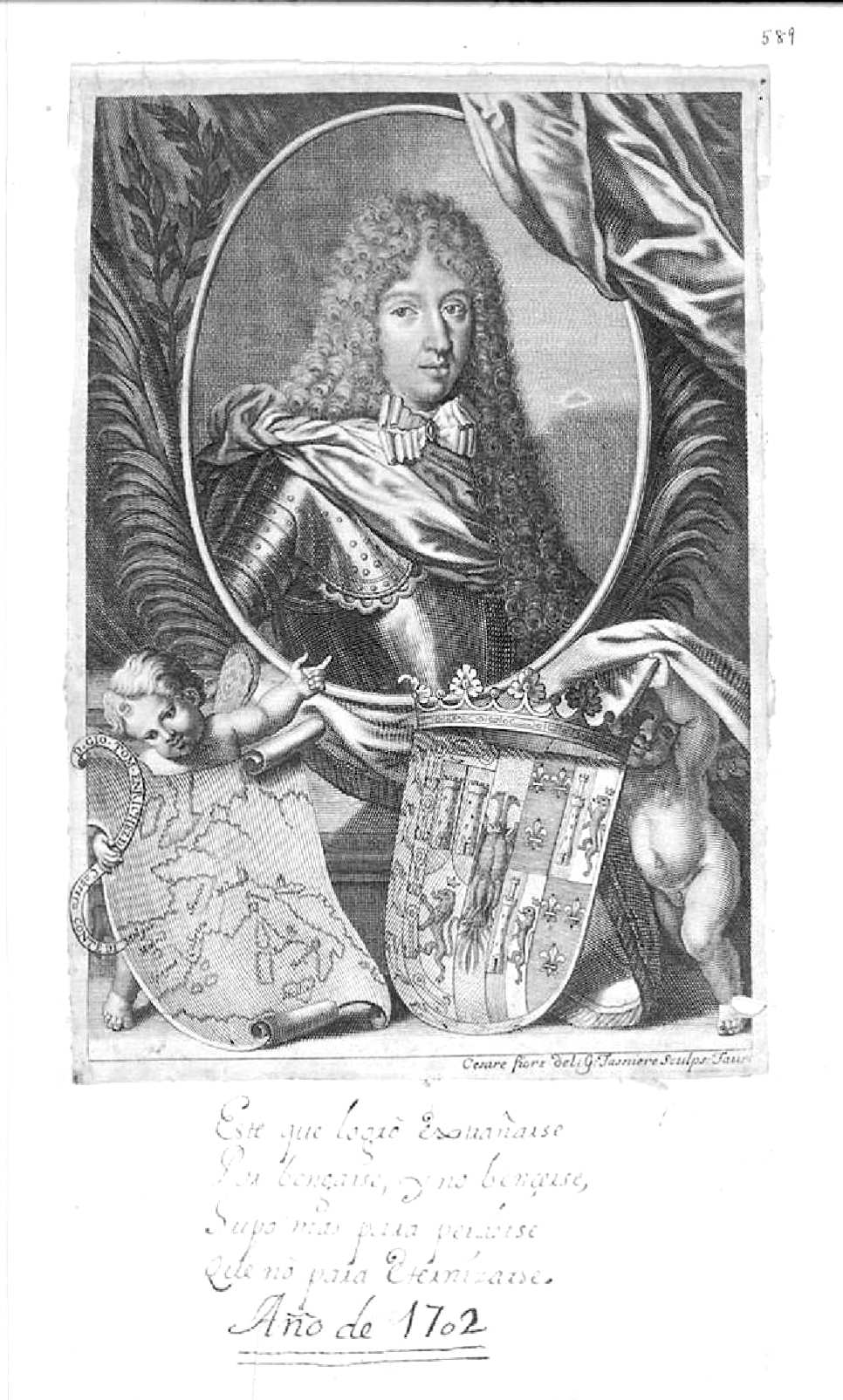
Portrait of the 7th Duke of Medina de Rioseco, c. 1702

Juan Tomás Enríquez de Cabrera y Ponce de Leon, 7th Duke of Medina de Ríoseco (Genoa, Italy, 1646 – Estremoz, Portugal, 1705), was a Spanish noble and military leader.

== Biography ==
He belonged to the important Enríquez family, whose title Duke of Medina de Ríoseco (Duque de Medina de Río-Seco) was awarded by King Charles I of Spain, Emperor Charles V, in April 1538. His father was Juan Gaspar Enríquez de Cabrera y Sandoval and his grandfather, Juan Alfonso Enríquez de Cabrera, 5th Duke of Medina de Rioseco, Viceroy of Sicily, in 1641–1644, and Viceroy of Naples in 1644–1646.

He was the 11th and last hereditary Admiral of Castile, Governor of the Duchy of Milan, (1678–1686), Viceroy of Catalonia, (1688), member of the State Council, ambassador in Rome and France, Caballerizo mayor to the King and Field Marshal of the Holy Roman Empire (1705).

He was politically exiled from Spain by siding with Archduke Charles, later Emperor of the Holy Roman Empire Charles VI of Austria (1685–1740) in the War of Spanish Succession. He lived the last years of his life in Portugal and died in Estremoz.

=== Marriages ===
He married in 1662 with Ana Catalina de la Cerda Portocarrero, daughter of Antonio de la Cerda, 7th Duke of Medinaceli.

After his wife's death, he remarried in 1697 with her niece, Ana Catalina de la Cerda y de Cardona-Aragon, (1663–1698), widow since 1690 of Pedro Antonio de Aragón 5th Duke of Segorbe, Viceroy of Naples in 1664–1671, and daughter of Juan Francisco de la Cerda (1637–1691), 8th Duke of Medinaceli, Knight of the Order of the Golden Fleece in 1670, PM of King Carlos II of Spain and many other lesser titles, and Catalina Antonia de Cardona-Aragon y Sandoval, 9th Duchess of Cardona, 8th Duchess of Segorbe on her own rights.

He had no surviving issue and was succeeded by his brother Luis Enríquez de Cabrera y Álvarez de Toledo (1649–1713).
