= Duke of Medina de Rioseco =

Hereditary title in the Peerage of Spain

Dukedom of Medina de Rioseco
- Creation date: 22 April 1538
- Created by: Charles I
- Peerage: Peerage of Spain
- First holder: Fernando Enríquez de Velasco, 1st Duke of Medina de Rioseco
- Present holder: María Asunción Latorre y Téllez-Girón, 21st Duchess of Medina de Rioseco

Duke of Medina de Rioseco (Spanish: Duque de Medina de Rioseco) is a hereditary title in the Peerage of Spain, accompanied by the dignity of Grandee and granted in 1538 by Charles I to Fernando Enríquez de Velasco, Admiral of Castile and Lord of Medina de Rioseco.

== Dukes of Medina de Rioseco (1538) ==
- Fernando Enríquez de Velasco, 1st Duke of Medina de Rioseco (1538-1542)
- Luis Enríquez y Téllez-Girón, 2nd Duke of Medina de Rioseco (1542-1567)
- Luis Enríquez de Cabrera, 3rd Duke of Medina de Rioseco (1567-1596)
- Luis Enríquez de Cabrera y Mendoza, 4th Duke of Medina de Rioseco (1596-1600)
- Juan Alfonso Enríquez de Cabrera, 5th Duke of Medina de Rioseco (1600-1647)
- Juan Gaspar Enríquez de Cabrera y Sandoval, 6th Duke of Medina de Rioseco (1647-1691)
- Juan Tomás Enríquez de Cabrera y Álvarez de Toledo, 7th Duke of Medina de Rioseco (1691-1705)
- Luis Enríquez de Cabrera y Álvarez de Toledo, 8th Duke of Medina de Rioseco (1705-1713)
- Pascual Enríquez de Cabrera y Almansa, 9th Duke of Medina de Rioseco (1713-1736)
- Francisco Alfonso Pimentel y de Borja, 10th Duke of Medina de Rioseco (1736-1763)
- Ignacio Enríquez de Cabrera, 11th Duke of Medina de Rioseco (1763-1764)
- Joaquín Enríquez de Cabrera y Pimentel, 12th Duke of Medina de Rioseco (1771-1792)
- Serafín Pimentel y Álvarez de Toledo, 13th Duke of Medina de Rioseco (1792-1799)
- Pedro de Alcántara Téllez-Girón y Beaufort-Spontin, 14th Duke of Medina de Rioseco (?-1844)
- Mariano Téllez-Girón y Beaufort-Spontin, 15th Duke of Medina de Rioseco (1844-1882)
- Pedro de Alcántara Téllez-Girón y Fernández de Santilla, 16th Duke of Medina de Rioseco (1882-1884)
- María de la Piedad Téllez-Girón y Fernández de Velasco, 17th Duchess of Medina de Rioseco (1884-1897)
- María del Rosario Téllez-Girón Fernández de Córdoba, 18th Duchess of Medina de Rioseco (1900-1906)
- Bernardina Téllez-Girón y Fernández de Córdoba, 19th Duchess of Medina de Rioseco (1906-1964)
- Ángela Téllez-Girón y Duque de Estrada, 20th Duchess of Medina de Rioseco (1971-1982)
- María Asunción Latorre y Téllez-Girón, 21st Duchess of Medina de Rioseco (1982-)

== See also ==
- List of dukes in the peerage of Spain
- List of current grandees of Spain
