= Fadrique Enríquez =

Fadrique Enríquez may refer to:

- Fadrique Enríquez de Mendoza (1390–1473), great-grandson of Alfonso XI of Castile and his mistress Leonor de Guzmán
- Fadrique Enríquez de Velasco (1460–1538), grandson of the preceding
