= Anna Cabrera Ximénez =

Italian ruler

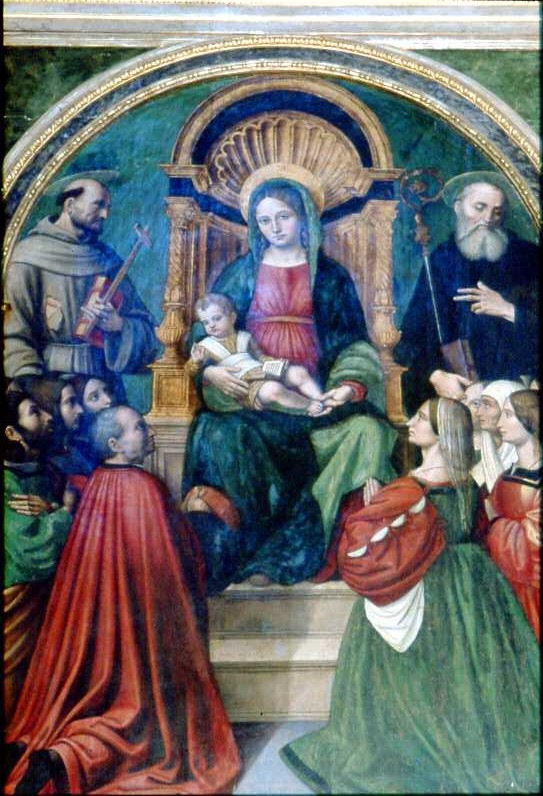
DIpinto nella Chiesa di Santa Maria, Alcamo

Anna Cabrera Ximénez (1460–1526) was an Italian ruler. She was the ruling Countess of Modica between 1477 and 1526.

She married in 1480 to Fadrique Enríquez de Velasco, 4th Admiral of Castile (c. 1465–1538). They had no children.
