= Francisco Ruiz de Castro =

Spanish nobleman and politician

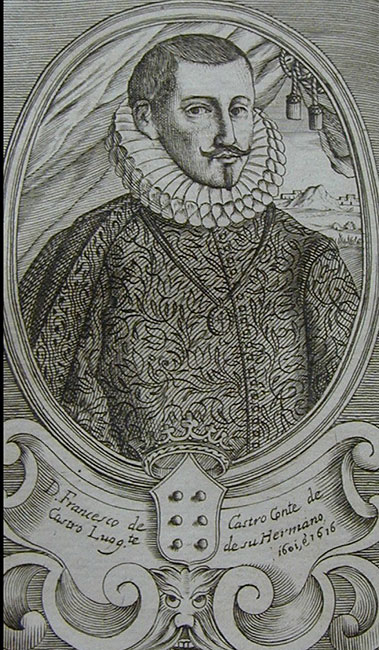
Francisco Ruiz de Castro

Francisco Ruiz de Castro y de Sandoval-Rojas (May 1579 – 1637) was a Spanish nobleman and politician the 8th Count of Lemos.

== Biography ==
Francisco Ruiz de Castro was born in Madrid. His father, Fernando Ruiz de Castro, was Viceroy of Naples from 1599 to 1601 and Francisco succeeded him in the same year. His elder brother Pedro Fernández de Castro, 7th count of Lemos, will be later also Viceroy of Naples in 1610–1616.

Francisco remained in Naples until April 1603. In 1616 he became Viceroy of Sicily, a position he held until 1622. He played an instrumental role in establishing the Orfanotrofio del Buon Pastore in Palermo; a boy's orphanage which eventually evolved into the Palermo Conservatory of Music.

In 1629, he became a Benedictine monk at the monastery of San Benito in Sahagun, with the name of Father Agustín de Castro. He died in 1637, and was interred at Monforte de Lemos, Galicia, his family's burial place.

=== Marriage and children ===
He married in 1610 Lucrecia Legnano de Gattinara, Duchess of Taurisano (1590-1623 in childbirth). They had seven children of which four died very young. He was succeeded by his eldest son

- Francisco Fernández De Castro, 9th Count of Lemos (1613-1663).

== Sources ==
=== Bibliography ===
- Elorza, Juan C.; Lourdes Vaquero, Belén Castillo, Marta Negro (1990). Junta de Castilla y León. Consejería de Cultura y Bienestar Social (ed.). El Panteón Real de las Huelgas de Burgos. Los enterramientos de los reyes de León y de Castilla, 2ª edición, Editorial Evergráficas S.A., pp. 54. ISBN 84-241-9999-5.
- Augustinian Father J.M. Cuenca Coloma, Sahagún, monasterio y villa (1085-1985) Edit. Estudio Agustiniano 1985. Another edition, Valladolid, 1993.

Government offices
Preceded by Fernando Ruiz de Castro Andrade y Portugal	Viceroy of Naples; 1601-1603	Succeeded by Juan Alonso Pimentel de Herrera, 5th Duke of Benavente
Preceded by Pedro Téllez-Girón, 3rd Duke of Osuna	Viceroy of Sicily; 1616-1622	Succeeded by Emanuel Filibert of Savoy
