= Fernando Ruiz de Castro Andrade y Portugal =

Galician (Spanish) nobleman

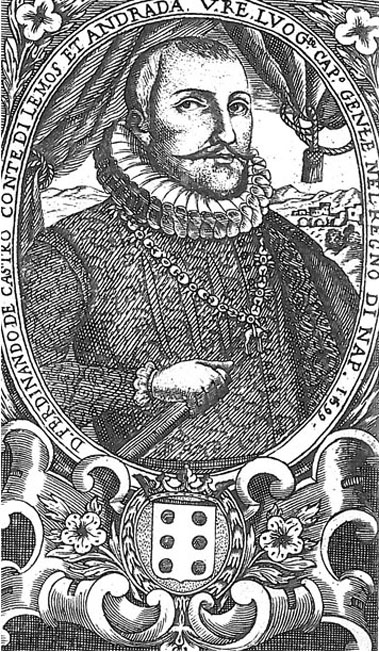
Fernando Ruiz de Castro Andrade y Portugal

Fernando Ruiz de Castro Andrade y Portugal (14 December 1548 - 20 September 1601) was a Galician (Spanish) nobleman who was Viceroy of Naples from 1599 to 1601. He was the 6th Count of Lemos, an old title from Galicia, centered in the lands around the town of Monforte de Lemos. He was also 3rd Marquis of Sarria and a grandee of Spain.

== Biography ==
He was born at Lerma as son of Pedro Fernández de Castro, V Count of Lemos and his first wife, Leonor de la Cueva y Girón, daughter of Beltrán de la Cueva, 3rd Duke of Alburquerque.

He married in 1574 Catalina de Zúñiga y Sandoval, sister of the Duke of Lerma, Valido and "shadow king" of Spain between 1601 and 1618. They had 3 sons :

- Pedro Fernández de Castro, Count of Lemos (1576–1622),
- Francisco Ruiz de Castro, Duke of Taurisano (1579–1637),
- Fernando Ruiz De Castro, Count of Gelves (1583–1618)

In 1599, he was appointed Viceroy of Naples. Philosopher Tommaso Campanella was incarcerated during his tenure in Naples (1599). He also ordered the construction of Royal Palace of Naples, designed by Domenico Fontana.

Fernando Ruiz de Castro died in Naples two years later. His second son Francisco Ruiz de Castro succeeded him as viceroy of Naples.

Government offices
Preceded by Enrique de Guzmán	Viceroy of Naples; 1599-1601	Succeeded by Francisco Ruiz de Castro
