= Count of Villaverde =

Spanish nobility

Countship of Villaverde
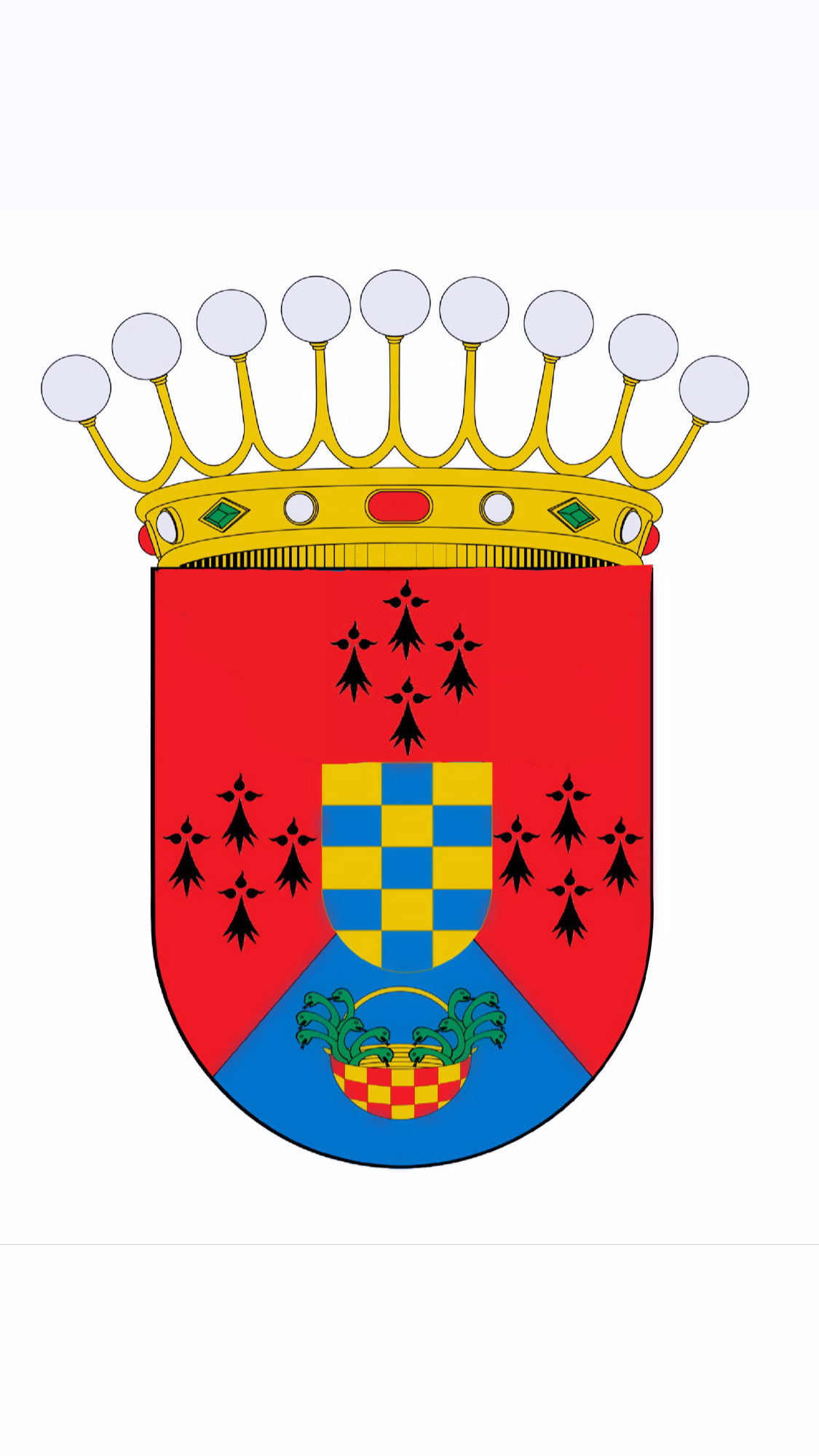
- Coat of arms of the Counts of Villaverde
- Creation date: 15 May 1602
- Created by: Philip III
- Peerage: Peerage of Spain
- First holder: Lope de Guzmán y Portocarrero, 1st Count of Villaverde
- Last holder: Jose Maria Ramirez de Haro y Ulloa, 15th Count of Villaverde
- Present holder: Vacant
- Heir presumptive: Victor García García
- Former seat: Dehesa de Villaverde (Orgáz)

Count of Villaverde de Madrid (Spanish: Conde de Villaverde de Madrid), commonly known as Count of Villaverde is a hereditary title in the Peerage of Spain, granted in 1602 by Philip III to Lope de Guzmán y Portocarrero.

On 10 January 1958, it received the current name of "Villaverde County of Madrid", replacing the primitive and original "Villaverde County", being therefore, this new title successor and continuation of the original one.

== Counts of Villaverde (1602) ==
- Lope de Guzmán y Portocarrero (d. 1624), I Count of Villaverde and lord of Villaverde.

In 1561 he married Francisca Niño de Guevara, daughter of Rodrigo Niño de Zapata, knight and thirteen of the Order of Santiago, and Teresa de Guzmán, and sister of the first earl of Añover. His son succeeded him:

- Tello de Guzmán y Guevara, II Count of Villaverde.

He contracted a first marriage with Francisca Portocarrero. No descendants. He remarried Ana María de Zúñiga, daughter of Pedro de Zúñiga, II Marquis of Aguilafuente, and Ana Ana Enríquez de Cabrera. His daughter succeeded him from his second marriage:

- Magdalena Francisca de Guzmán y Guevara, III Countess of Villaverde.

She first married Diego de Pimentel y Zúñiga (d. 1624), knight of the Order of Alcántara and commander of Mayorga in the order, son of Juan Alonso-Pimentel and Enríquez de Herrera, V Duke of Benavente, etc. and his second wife, Mencía de Zúñiga Mendoza y Requesséns, widow of the III Marquis of los Vélez. He contracted a second marriage with Miguel Gerónimo Pérez de Guzmán, knight of Calatrava, son of Alonso Pérez de Guzmán el Bueno y Zúñiga, VII Duke of Medina de Sidonia, and his wife Ana Magdalena Gómez de Silva y Mendoza. Succeeded him his daughter from the first marriage:

- Mencía de Guzmán y Pimentel (d. 1668), IV Countess of Villaverde since 18 January 1658.

Married Luis de Guzmán y Ponce de León (1603-1668), son of Rodrigo Ponce de León y Figueroa, III Duke of Arcos. His daughter succeeded him:

- María de Atocha de Guzmán y Ponce de León (d. 6 October 1687), V Countess of Villaverde.

Being his first wife, she married Gaspar de la Cerda Sandoval y Silva (1653-1697), VIII Count of Galve, XLI Governor and XXXV Viceroy of Mexico. Without offspring, it happened:

- Bartolomé González de Andía-Irarrázabal y Howard (d. Mantua, 27 October 1734), VI Count of Villaverde, IV Viscount of Santa Clara de Avedillo, IV Marquis of Valparaíso and XII Lord of Higares. He was the son of Sebastián González de Andía-Irarrázabal and Enríquez de Toledo, II Viscount of Santa Clara de Avedillo, 2nd Marquis of Valparaíso and 11th Lord of Higares —son of Francisco de Andía Irarrazábal y Zárate, 1st Marquis of Valparaiso, and Blanca Enríquez Álvarez de Toledo y Guzmán—, and his wife, lady Frances Howard.

No offspring, his nephew succeeded:

- Juan José de Andía Irarrázabal, VII Count of Villaverde. Happened:
- Antonio María Pantoja y Bellvís de Moncada (Seville, 14 February 1719-Madrid, 7 February 1778), VIII Count of Villaverde, V Marquis of Valencina, VIII Count of Torrejón, Grandee of Spain, XIX Lord of Mocejón and Benacazón and Lieutenant Major of Toledo. He was the son of Félix Francisco Pantoja Portocarrero Carvajal, IV Marquis of Valencina and VII Count of Torrejón, and Josefa María Bellvís de Moncada Exarch Córdoba Torres and Portugal.

He married firstly on 12 June 1741, in Madrid, with María Francisca Abarca de Bolea y Pons de Mendoza (1722-1770), daughter of the IX count of Aranda, and secondly married on 10 December 1770 with María Manuela de Córdoba y Pimentel, VI Marchioness of Fuentes, V Countess of Torralva, V Countess of Talhara, etc. With no surviving offspring, his sister succeeded:

- María Blasa Pantoja Portocarrero Bellvís y Moncada (Seville, 6 February 1714-Madrid, 15 December 1793), IX Countess of Villaverde, IX Countess of Torrejón, Grandee of Spain, VI Marchioness of Valencina and Lady of Mocejón y Benacazón.

He married on 13 June 1736, in Toledo, with her second cousin, Rodrigo Ant

== Bibliography ==
- Cuesta Nieto, José Antonio (2015). "El condado de Villaverde (Toledo) en los siglos XVIII y XIX". Tiempos modernos: Revista electrónica de Historia Moderna. 8 (31): 89–122. ISSN 1699-7778.
- Mayoralgo y Lodo, José Miguel; Gómez de Olea y Bustinza, Javier (1998–1999). "Los condes de Torrejón" (PDF). Anales de la Real Academia Matritense de Heráldica y Genealogía (5): 185–268. ISSN 1133-1240.
- Soler Salcedo, Juan Miguel (2020). Nobleza Española. Grandezas Inmemoriales (2.ª ed.). Madrid: Visión Libros. ISBN 978-84-17755-62-1.
