= Count of Lemos =

Spanish nobility title

Countship of Lemos
- Creation date: 26 May 1456
- Created by: Henry IV
- Peerage: Peerage of Spain
- First holder: Pedro Álvarez Osorio, 1st Count of Lemos
- Present holder: Carlos Fitz-James Stuart y Martínez de Irujo, 23rd Count of Lemos

Count of Lemos (Spanish: Conde de Lemos) is a hereditary title in the Peerage of Spain accompanied by the dignity of Grandee, granted in 1456 by Henry IV to Pedro Álvarez Osorio, as a result of his marriage to Beatriz Enríquez de Castilla, a cousin of the king.

The title makes reference to the town of Monforte de Lemos in Lugo, Spain.

== Counts of Lemos (1456) ==
- Pedro Álvarez Osorio, 1st Count of Lemos
- Rodrigo Enríquez Osorio, 2nd Count of Lemos
- Beatriz de Castro Osorio, 3rd Countess of Lemos
- Fernando Ruiz de Castro y Portugal, 4th Count of Lemos
- Pedro Fernández de Castro y Portugal, 5th Count of Lemos
- Fernando Ruiz de Castro Andrade y Portugal, 6th Count of Lemos
- Pedro Fernández de Castro y Andrade, 7th Count of Lemos
- Francisco Ruiz de Castro Andrade y Portugal, 8th Count of Lemos
- Francisco Fernández De Castro, 9th Count of Lemos
- Pedro Antonio Fernández de Castro, 10th Count of Lemos
- Ginés Fernando Ruiz De Castro y Portugal, 11th Count of Lemos
- Rosa María Fernández De Castro, 12th Countess of Lemos
- Joaquín López de Zúñiga y Castro, 13th Count of Lemos
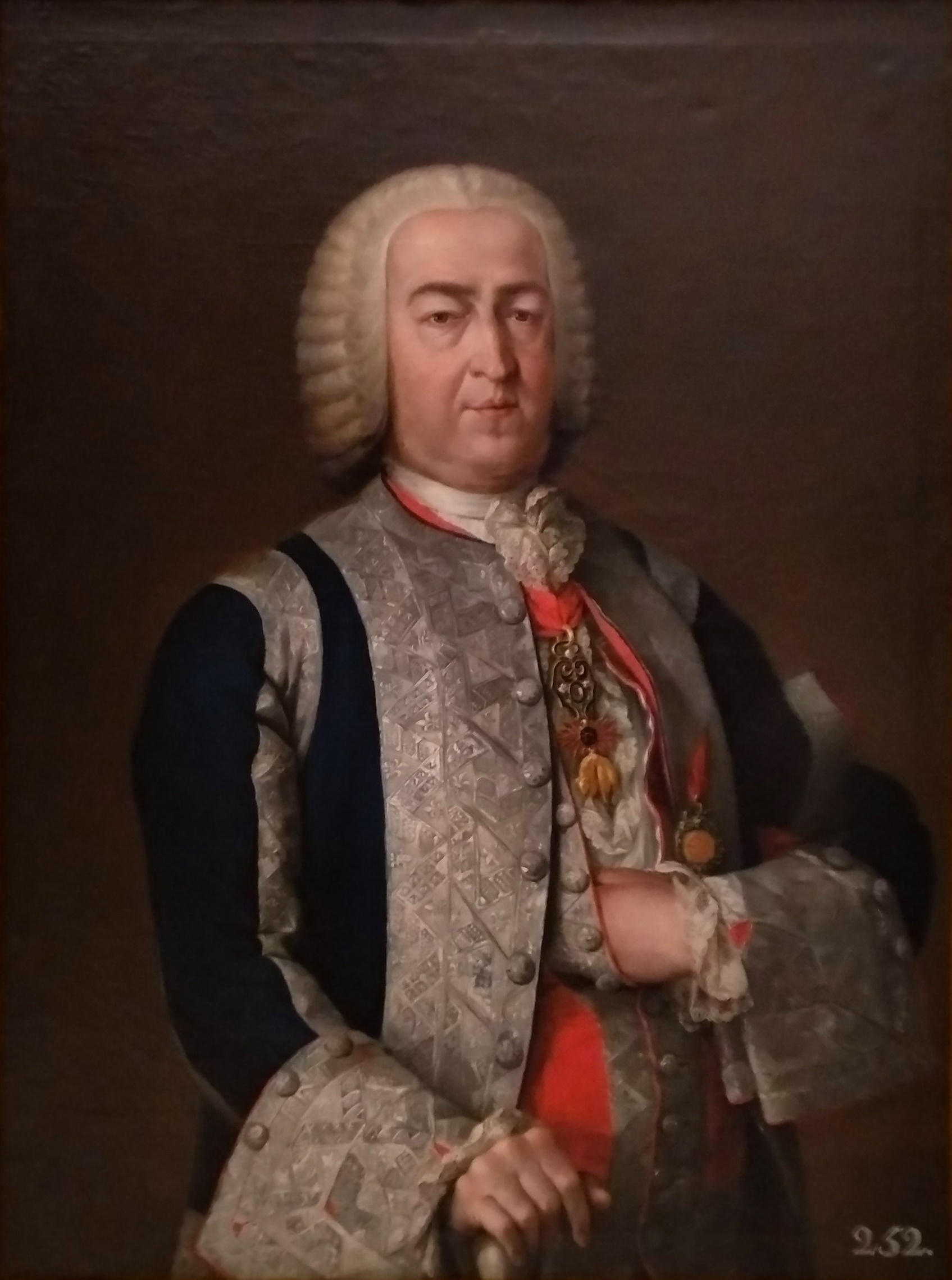
  Portrait of the 13th Count of Lemos, c. 1752, Real Academia de Bellas Artes de San Fernando
- Jacobo Fitz-James Stuart, 14th Count of Lemos
- Carlos Fitz-James Stuart y Silva, 15th Count of Lemos
- Jacobo Fitz-James Stuart y Stolberg-Gedern, 16th Count of Lemos
- Jacobo Fitz-James Stuart y Silva, 17th Count of Lemos
- Carlos Miguel Fitz-James Stuart y Silva, 18th Count of Lemos
- Jacobo Fitz-James Stuart y Ventimiglia, 19th Count of Lemos
- Carlos María Fitz-James Stuart y Portocarrero, 20th Count of Lemos
- Jacobo Fitz-James Stuart, 21st Count of Lemos
- Cayetana Fitz-James Stuart, 22nd Countess of Lemos
- Carlos Fitz-James Stuart, 23rd Count of Lemos

== See also ==
- List of current grandees of Spain
