= Fernando Enríquez de Velasco =

Fernando Enríquez de Velasco (around 1466 - 1545), 1st Duke of Medina de Rioseco, was the 5th Admiral of Castile.

== Biography ==
Fernando Enríquez was the son of Alonso Enríquez (1435–1485) and María de Velasco. He inherited the titles from his elder brother Fadrique Enríquez when he died without children in 1538.
For his services to the Crown, he was promoted to Duke by King Charles I of Spain.

He married with María Girón, daughter of Juan Téllez-Girón, 2nd Count of Ureña, and had 5 children:

- Luis Enríquez y Téllez-Girón, his successor
- Fadrique Enríquez Girón, commander in the Order of Santiago and Mayordomo to King Charles I.
- Fernando, Maestrescuela of Salamanca and Archdeacon of Madrid;
- María Luisa Girón Enríquez, married Antonio Alonso Pimentel y Herrera de Velasco, 3rd Duke of Benavente.
- Alonso, Abbot in Valladolid

== Sources ==
- Real Academia de la Historia
