= Ángela Téllez-Girón, 16th Duchess of Osuna =

Spanish noblewoman

Ángela María Téllez-Girón y Duque de Estrada, 16th Duchess of Osuna, GE (1925–2015) was a Spanish noblewoman. She was a holder of ten grandeeships of Spain.

== Early life ==
Ángela María Téllez-Girón was born on February 7, 1925, to Mariano Téllez-Girón y Fernández de Córdoba, 15th Duke of Osuna, and Petra Duque de Estrada y Moreno.

== Personal life ==
On October 26, 1946, she married Pedro de Solís-Beaumont y Lasso de la Vega of the Marquises of Valencina and the Marquises of las Torres de la Presa. They were married in Espejo, Spain. The couple had two children:

- Ángela María de Solís-Beaumont y Téllez-Girón, 17th Duchess of Arcos.
- María de la Gracia de Solís-Beaumont y Téllez-Girón, 19th Duchess of Plasencia.

In 1959, Pedro de Solís-Beaumont y Lasso de la Vega died and Ángela Téllez-Girón became a widow. Four years later, on December 4, 1963, she remarried to José María Latorre y Montalvo who was the 6th Marquis of Montemuzo and the 8th Marquis of Alcántara del Cuervo. Ángela had two daughters during her second marriage:

- María del Pilar de la Torre y Téllez-Girón, who became the XV Duchess of Uceda;
- María de la Asunción de la Torre y Téllez-Girón, who became the Duchess of Medina de Rioseco and Countess of Salazar de Velasco.

The Duchess of Osuna died on May 29, 2015.

== Titles of Nobility ==
- Duchess of Osuna (xvi duquesa de Osuna)
- Duchess of Medina de Rioseco (xx duquesa de Medina de Rioseco)
- Countess of Ureña (xx condesa de Ureña, de la casa de Osuna)
- Duchess of Escalona (xix duquesa de Escalona)
- Marchioness of Villena (xix marquesa de Villena, de la casa de Pacheco;)
- Duchess of Arcos (xvi duquesa de Arcos, de la casa de Arcos;)
- Duchess of Gandía (xix duquesa de Gandía)
- Marquess of Lombay (xix marquesa de Lombay, de la casa de Gandía;)
- Countess-Duchess of Benavente (xvii condesa-duquesa de Benavente)
- Marchioness of Belmonte (xiv marquesa de Belmonte)
- Marchioness of Berlanga (xviii marquesa de Berlanga)
- Marchioness of Jabalquinto (xii marquesa de Jabalquinto)
- Marchioness of Frómista (xv marquesa de Frómista)
- Marchioness of Villar de Granjanejos (xiv marquesa del Villar de Grajanejos)
- Countess of Pinto (xv condesa de Pinto)
- Duchess of Medina de Rioseco (xii duquesa de Medina de Rioseco)
- Duchess of Uceda (xiv duquesa de Uceda)
- Countess of Oropesa (xx condesa de Oropesa)
- Countess of Peñaranda de Bracamonte (xvii condesa de Peñaranda de Bracamonte)
- Marchioness of Frechilla and Villarramiel (xviii marquesa de Frechilla y Villarramiel)
- Marchioness of Toral (xii marquesa de Toral)
- Countess of Alcuadete (xix condesa de Alcaudete)
- Countess of Fuensalida (xx condesa de Fuensalida)
- Countess of Puebla de Montalbán (xiii condesa de la Puebla de Montalbán)
- Lady of Espejo (xxviii señora de Espejo)
