= Villalón =

Villalón or Villalon may refer to:

- Alberto Villalón (1882–1955), one of the greatest musicians in the Cuban trova style
- Consuelo Villalon Aleman (1907–1998), a well-known Mexican pianist during the 20th century
- Eric Villalon (born 1973), a Paralympic alpine skier from Spain
- Fernando Villalón (1881–1930), a Spanish poet and farmer
- Jade Villalon (born 1980), an American and European pop singer, songwriter, and actress
- Lucía Villalón (born 1988), Spanish sports journalist and television presenter
- María Villalón (born 1989), a Spanish singer, winner of the first series of Spanish version of The X Factor in 2007
- Pedro de Rivera y Villalón, a brigadier general in the Spanish army, which was sent to New Mexico in 1724

== See also ==
- Villalón de Campos, a municipality located in the province of Valladolid, Castile and León, Spain
