= Juan Alfonso Enríquez de Cabrera, 5th Duke of Medina de Rioseco =

Juan Alfonso Enríquez de Cabrera 9th Admiral of Castile 5th Duke of Medina de Rioseco 7th Count of Melgar
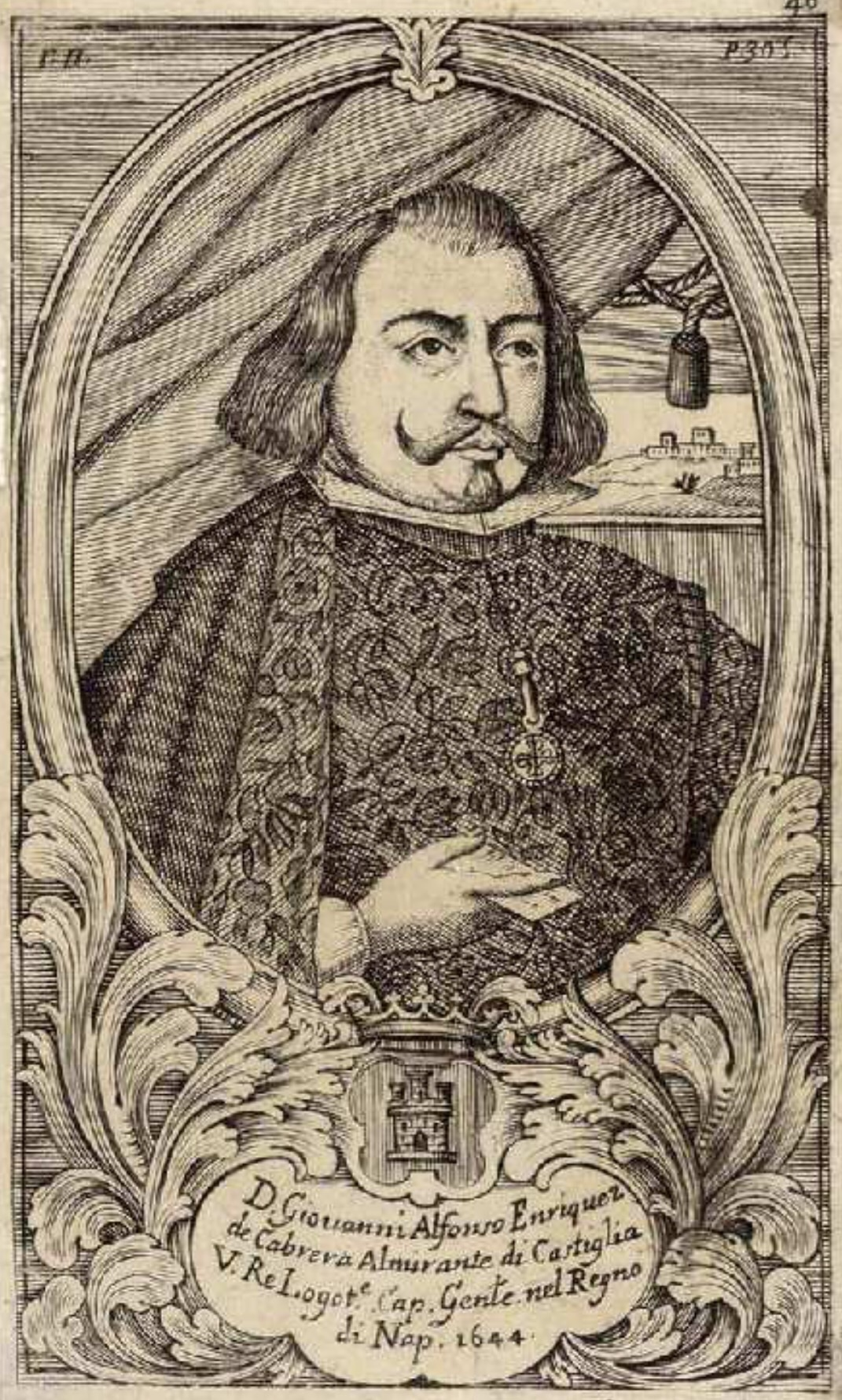
- In an engraving, 1694

Viceroy of Sicily
- In office 14 June 1641 – 1644
- Monarch: Philip IV
- Preceded by: Francisco de Melo
- Succeeded by: Pedro Fajardo de Zúñiga

Mayordomo mayor
- In office 1643 – 7 February 1647
- Monarch: Philip IV
- Preceded by: Manuel de los Cobos
- Succeeded by: Manuel de Moura Corte Real

Viceroy of Naples
- In office 6 May 1644 – 1646
- Monarch: Philip IV
- Preceded by: Ramiro Núñez de Guzmán
- Succeeded by: Rodrigo Ponce de León

Personal details
- Born: Juan Alfonso Enríquez de Cabrera y Colonna; 3 March 1599 Medina de Rioseco, Crown of Castile, Spanish Empire
- Died: 7 February 1647 (aged 47) Madrid, Crown of Castile, Spanish Empire
- Spouse(s): Francisca de Sandoval; Luisa de Sandoval y Padilla
- Children: Juan Gaspar Enríquez de Cabrera y Sandoval
- Parent(s): Luis Enríquez de Cabrera y Mendoza (father); Vittoria Colonna Henríquez-Cabrera (mother)

Juan Alfonso Enríquez de Cabrera y Colonna, 5th Duke of Medina de Rioseco, (3 March 1599 – Madrid, Spain, 6 February 1647), he was hereditary 9th Admiral of Castile, and the 8th Count of Melgar.

Juan Alfonso received his titles at the age of 3, when his father Luis III Enriquez de Cabrera died, under regency of his mother Italian Lady Vitoria Colonna (deceased 28 December 1633).
His mother, from Venezian and Roman families, was the daughter of Marcantonio II Colonna, (Civita Lavinia, 25 February 1535) – married, Rome, Italy, 29 April 1552 – Medinaceli, Spain, poisoned?, 1 August 1585), 3rd duke of Paliano, 1st duke of Tagliacozzo, count of Ceccano, lieutenant of the kingdom of Naples, Viceroy of Sicily, Knight of the Order of the Golden Fleece and Felice Orsini, deceased Rome, Italy 27 July 1596, the daughter of Girolamo Orsini, Sieur of Bracciano and Francesca Sforza, of the Counts of Santa Fiora. She had married Luis III Enriquez de Cabrera in Vich, Catalonia, Spain, on 31 December 1587.

In 1638, he raised the Siege of Fuenterrabía by defeating a superior French army under Henri, Prince of Condé.

For this, he was rewarded and became Viceroy of Sicily, 1641–1644, Viceroy of Naples, 6 May 1644 – 1646, Member of the Spanish Council of war, member of the Royal Council of Spain, and Mayordomo mayor to the King.

He married in 1612, Luisa de Sandoval Padilla, deceased 1664, daughter of Cristóbal de Sandoval, Duke of Uceda, (1577 – married 1597 – 1623), the eldest son of the 1st Duke of Lerma, the virtual Prime Minister of Spain at the time, also, first Duke of Uceda and 1st Duke of Cea.

He had only two children, a daughter who died young in Naples, and the eldest and only one to survive him, a son named Juan Gaspar (1625-1691).

== Sources ==
- Real Academia de la Historia

Government offices
Preceded by Francisco de Melo	Viceroy of Sicily; 1641–1644	Succeeded by Pedro Fajardo de Zúñiga y Requesens
Preceded by Ramiro Núñez de Guzmán	Viceroy of Naples; 1644–1646	Succeeded by Rodrigo Ponce de León, 4th Duke of Arcos
Spanish nobility
Preceded by Luis Enríquez de Cabrera	Duke of Medina de Rioseco; 1600–1647	Succeeded by Juan Gaspar Enríquez de Cabrera
