= Fadrique Enríquez de Velasco =

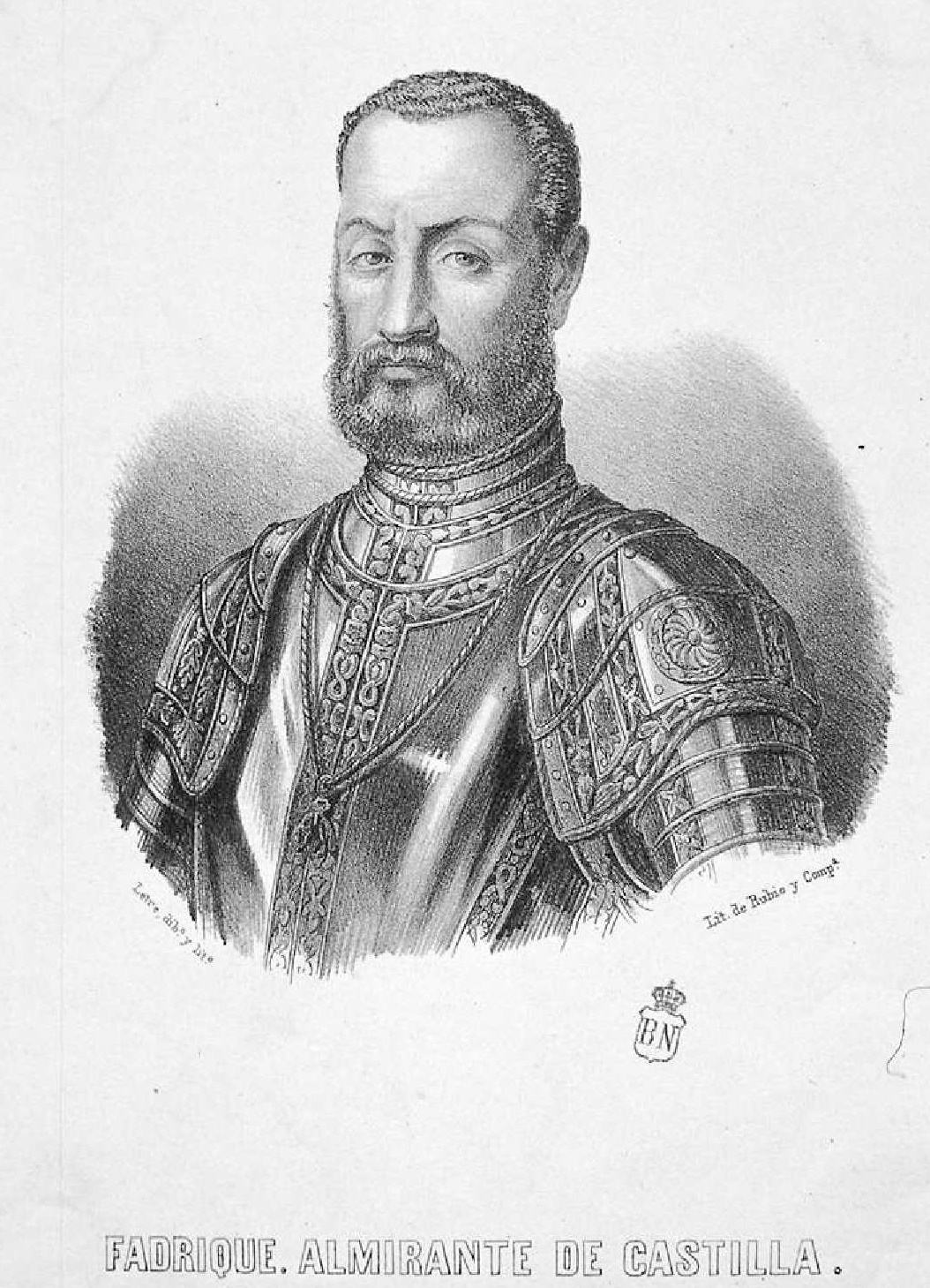
Painting of Fadrique Enríquez de Velasco, almirante de Castilla. Litography by Eusebio de Letre. Biblioteca Nacional de España.

Fadrique Enríquez de Velasco II (c. 1465–1538), 4th Lord of Medina de Rioseco, was the 4th Admiral of Castile and played an important role in defeating the Revolt of the Comuneros.

Fadrique Enríquez was the son of Alonso Enríquez (1435-1485) (son of Fadrique Enriquez I) and María de Velasco. He inherited his father's possessions in Palencia and the castle of Medina de Rioseco. On February 14, 1490, he was appointed Admiral of Castile by the Reyes Católicos. He was a cousin of King Ferdinand II of Aragon, son of John II of Aragon and Juana Enríquez of Córdoba.

Fadrique Enríquez was hot-tempered and was banished to Sicily after a row with Queen Isabella I of Castile. In 1489 he was rehabilitated and participated in the conquest of Baza and the Battle of Granada.

During his stay in Sicily, he married the very rich Ana de Cabrera, countess of Modica, Osona, Cabrera and Bas. They had no children.

Fadrique Enríquez himself was count of Melgar, lord of Medina de Rioseco, Mansilla, Rueda, Aguilar, and Villabrajima and was one of the richest persons in Spain. His yearly income was estimated at 50.000 ducats.

In 1496 he accompanied Joanna of Castile to Flanders to be married to Philip the Handsome. On his return, he escorted Philip's sister, Margaret, to Spain to be married to prince John.

Fadrique reached the highest political power during the Revolt of the Comuneros. In 1520 he became, together with his cousin Íñigo Fernández de Velasco, 2nd Duke of Frías, governor of Spain in the absence of Charles V. He brought peace and was rewarded by the Emperor with the Order of the Golden Fleece.

Fadrique Enríquez was mecenas of artists like Juan Boscán.

He is buried with his wife in the monastery of San Francisco in Medina de Rioseco.

He was succeeded by his brother Fernando Enríquez de Velasco.

== Sources ==
- Real Academia de la Historia
- Todo Avante : Fadrique Enriquez de Cabrera y Velasco, Biografia
