= Pedro Fernández de Castro, Count of Lemos =

Galician (Spanish) nobleman (1576–1622)

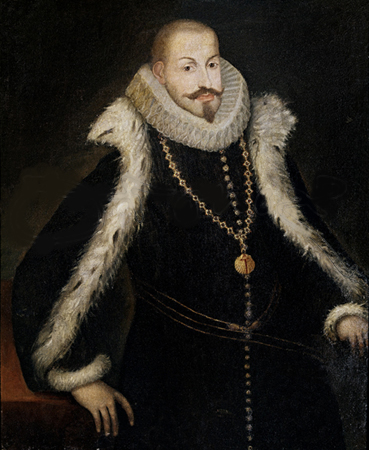
Pedro Fernández de Castro.

Pedro Fernández de Castro y Andrade (1576–1622), better known as the Great Count of Lemos, was a Galician (Spanish) nobleman who was viceroy of Naples between 1610-1616, and was also president of the Council of the Indies and of Italy.

== Biography ==
A member of the House of Castro, he was born at Monforte de Lemos as son of Fernando Ruiz de Castro Andrade y Portugal, VI Count of Lemos and Catalina de Zúñiga y Sandoval, sister of the Duke of Lerma, Valido and "shadow king" of Spain between 1601 and 1618.

King Philip III of Spain named him president of the Council of the Indies in 1603. In 1608 he was appointed Viceroy of Naples. During his tenure in southern Italy, he ordered the reconstruction of the University of Royal Studies in Naples, and commissioned the reclamation of lands of the Volturno plain in the Terra di Lavoro.

He was the patron of writers such as Miguel de Cervantes, Lope de Vega, Francisco de Quevedo, the Argensola brothers and others.

He married in 1598 his cousin Catalina de Sandoval, daughter of the Duke of Lerma, but had no children.
He died in Madrid in 1622.

Government offices
Preceded by Juan Alonso Pimentel de Herrera	Viceroy of Naples; 1610-1616	Succeeded by Pedro Téllez-Girón
