= Villalón de Campos =

Coordinates: 42.100°N 5.033°W

Villalón de Campos, Spain
- Coat of arms
- Interactive map of Villalón de Campos, Spain
- Country: Spain
- Autonomous community: Castile and León
- Province: Valladolid
- Municipality: Villalón de Campos

Government

Area
  - Total: 70.33 km^{2} (27.15 sq mi)
- Elevation: 843 m (2,766 ft)

Population (2025-01-01)
  - Total: 1,473
  - Density: 20.94/km^{2} (54.25/sq mi)
- Time zone: UTC+1 (CET)
  - Summer (DST): UTC+2 (CEST)

Villalón de Campos is a municipality located in the province of Valladolid, Castile and León, Spain. According to the 2004 census (INE), the municipality had a population of 2,040 inhabitants.

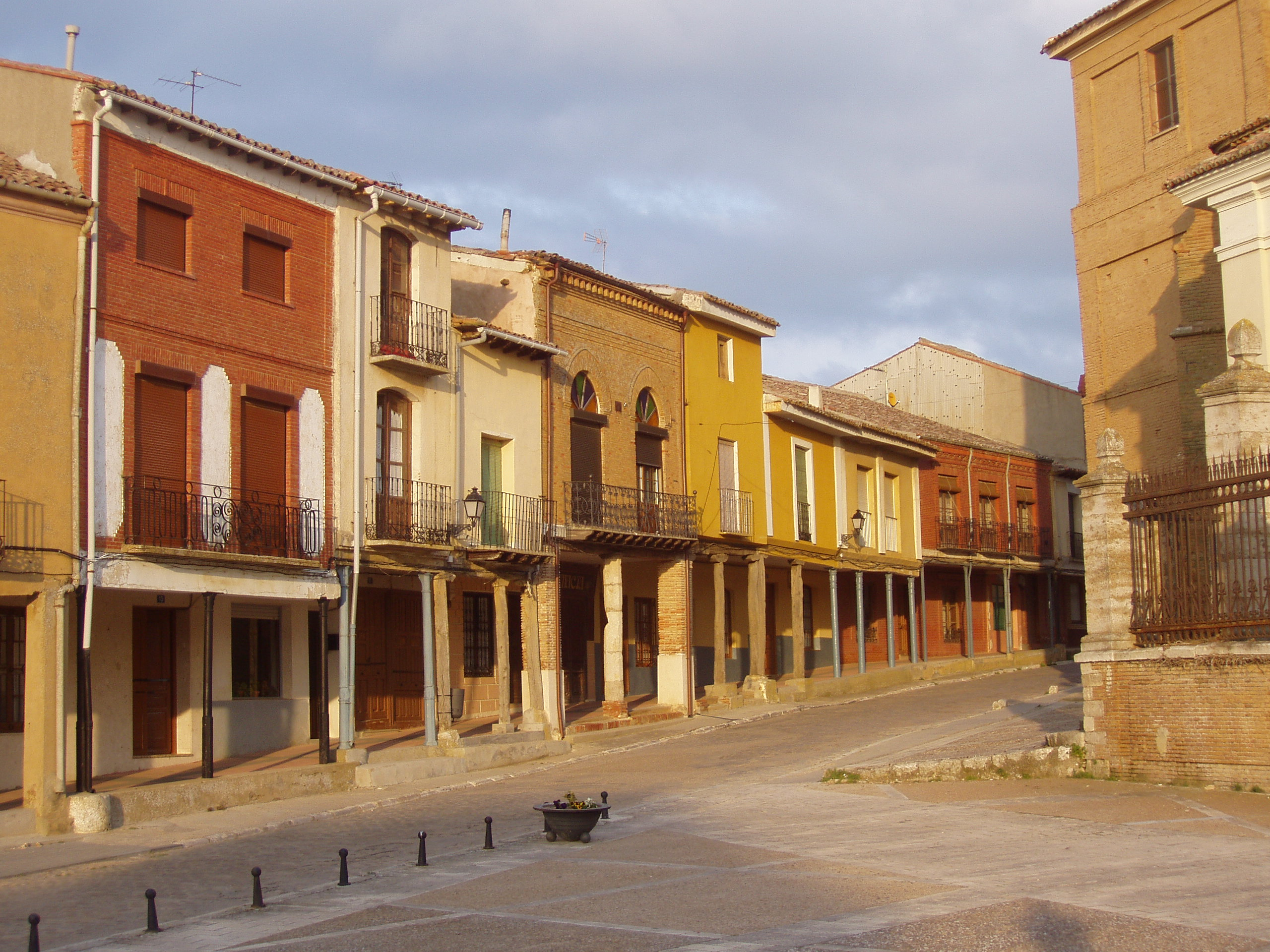
Plaza

== See also ==
- Cuisine of the province of Valladolid
