= Duke of Benavente =

Hereditary title in the Peerage of Spain

Dukedom of Benavente
- Creation date: 1378
- Created by: Henry II
- Peerage: Peerage of Spain
- First holder: Fradique of Castille, 1st Duke of Benavente
- Present holder: Ángela María de Solís-Beaumont y Téllez-Girón, 18th Duchess of Benavente

Duke of Benavente (Spanish: Duque de Benavente) is a hereditary title in the Peerage of Spain, accompanied by the dignity of Grandee and granted in 1473 by Henry IV to Rodrigo Alonso Pimentel, 4th Count of Benavente. It had been granted before to Fradique of Castille, bastard son of Henry II.

Since the Countship of Benavente was not revoked after the concession of the dukedom, the holders of the distinction are technically Count-Dukes of Benavente, similar to the Count-Dukes of Olivares.

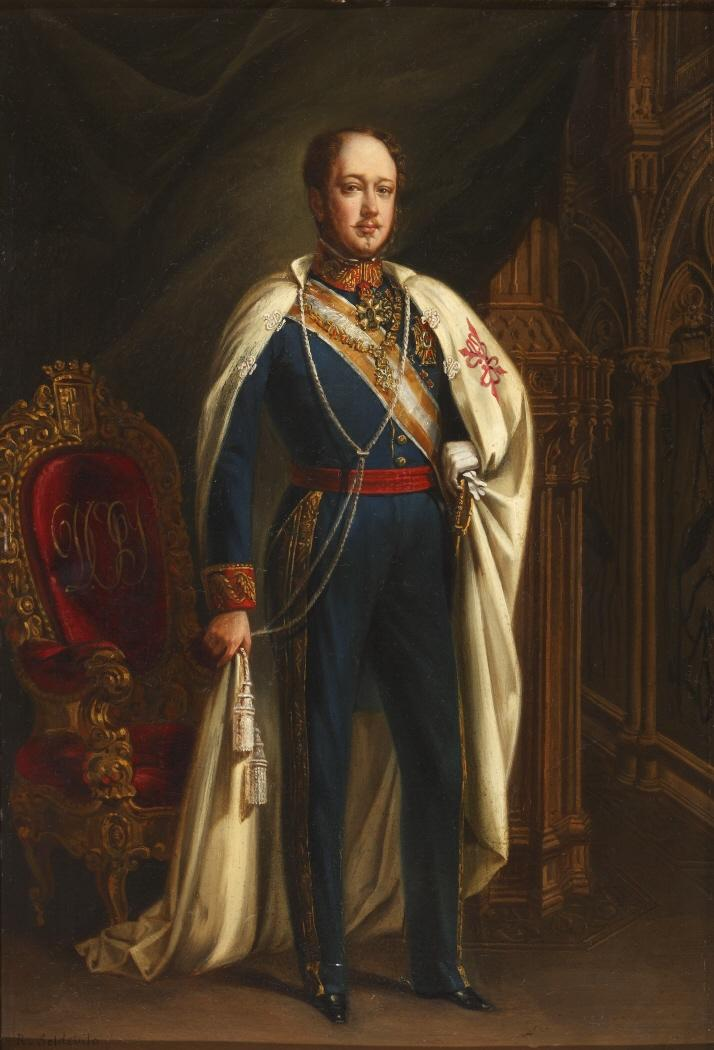
Portrait of the 15th Duke by Ramón Soldevila, 1857

== Duke of Benavente, created by Henry II (1378) ==
- Fradique of Castille, 1st Duke of Benavente (1378-1394)

== Counts of Benavente (1398) ==
- Juan Alonso Pimentel, 1st Count of Benavente (1396-1420)
- Rodrigo Alonso Pimentel, 2nd Count of Benavente (1420-1440)
- Alonso Pimentel y Enríquez, 3rd Count of Benavente (1440-1461)
- Rodrigo Alonso Pimentel, 4th Count-Duke of Benavente (1461-1499).

== Dukes of Benavente, created by Henry IV (1473) ==
- Rodrigo Alonso Pimentel, 1st Duke of Benavente (1473-1499)
- Alonso Pimentel y Pacheco, 2nd Duke of Benavente (1499-1530)
- Antonio Alonso Pimentel y Herrera de Velasco, 3rd Duke of Benavente (1530-1575)
- Luis Alonso Pimentel Herrera y Enríquez de Velasco, 4th Duke of Benavente (1575-1576)
- Juan Alonso Pimentel Herrera y Enríquez de Velasco, 5th Duke of Benavente (1576-1621)
- Antonio Alonso Pimentel y Quiñones, 6th Duke of Benavente (1621-1633)
- Juan Francisco Pimentel y Ponce de León, 7th Duke of Benavente (1633-1652)
- Antonio Alonso Pimentel y Herrera Zúñiga, 8th Duke of Benavente (1652-1677)
- Francisco Casimiro Pimentel de Quiñones y Benavides, 9th Duke of Benavente (1677-1709)
- Antonio Francisco Pimentel de Zúñiga y Vigil de Quiñones, 10th Duke of Benavente (1709-1743)
- Francisco Alonso Pimentel Vigil de Quiñones Borja Aragón y Centelles, 11th Duke of Benavente (1743-1763)
- María Josefa Pimentel, 12th Duchess of Benavente (1763-1834)
- Pedro de Alcántara Téllez-Girón y Beaufort-Spontin, 13th Duke of Benavente (1834-1844)
- Mariano Téllez-Girón y Beaufort-Spontin, 14th Duke of Benavente (1845-1882)
- Pedro de Alcántara Téllez-Girón y Fernández de Santillán, 15th Duke of Benavente (1882-1898)
- María Dolores Téllez Girón y Dominé, 16th Duchess of Benavente (1901-1939)
- Ángela María Téllez-Girón y Duque de Estrada, 17th Duchess of Benavente (1952-2015)
- Ángela María de Solís-Beaumont y Téllez-Girón, 18th Duchess of Benavente (2016-)

== See also ==
- List of dukes in the peerage of Spain
- List of current grandees of Spain
