= Luna, Aragon =

Luna
- Municipality
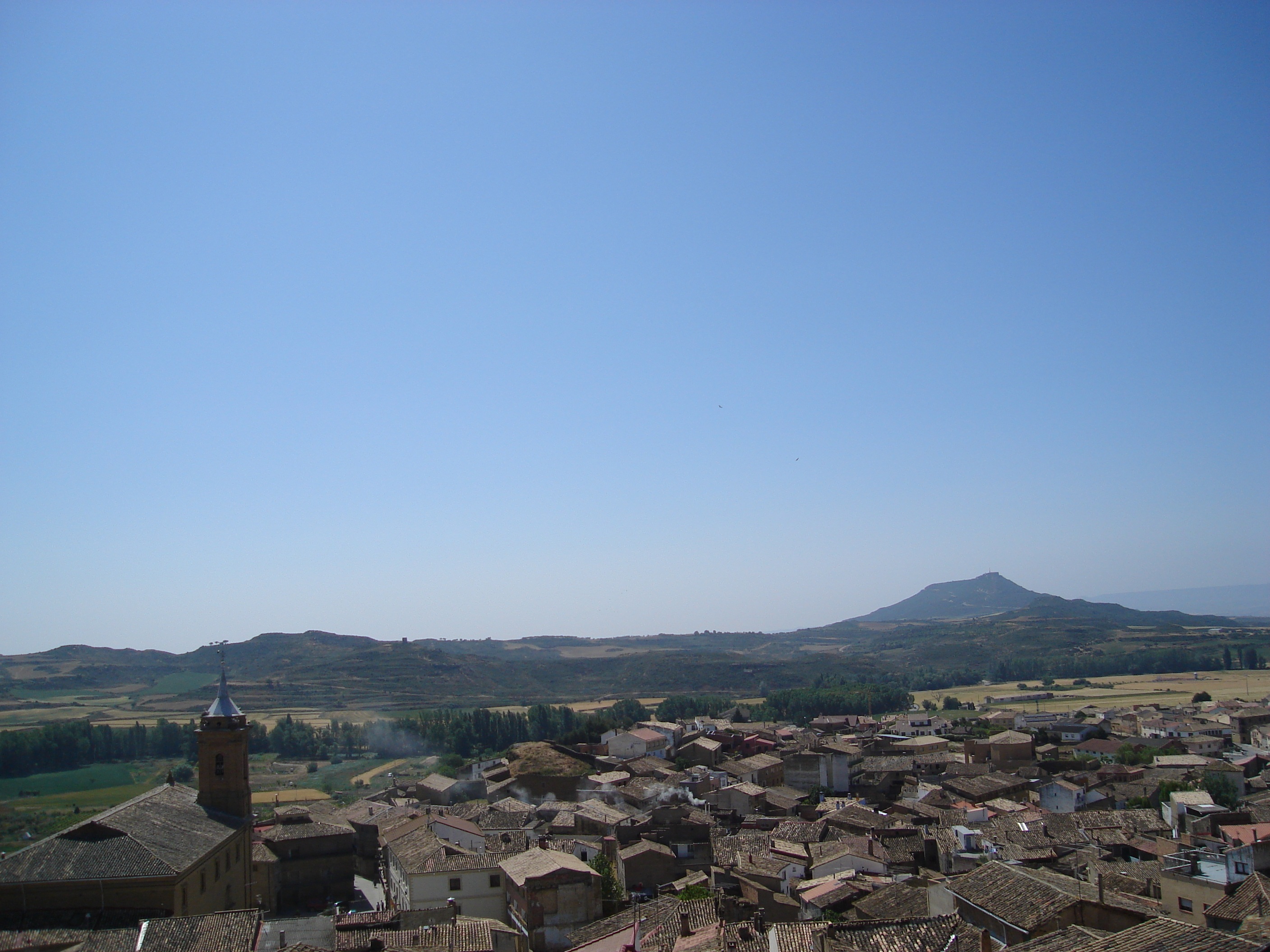
- City of Luna

- Coat of arms
- Interactive map of Luna
- Coordinates: 42°10′N 0°58′W
- Country: Spain
- Autonomous community: Aragon
- Province: Zaragoza
- Comarca: Cinco Villas

Government
  - Mayor: José Antonio Fuillerat Longarón

Area
  - Total: 308.92 km^{2} (119.27 sq mi)
- Elevation: 477 m (1,565 ft)

Population (2025-01-01)
  - Total: 674
  - Density: 2.18/km^{2} (5.65/sq mi)
- Demonym(s): Lunero (m), Lunera (f)
- Time zone: UTC+1 (CET)
  - Summer (DST): UTC+2 (CEST)
- Postal code: 50610

Luna is a municipality located in the province of Zaragoza, in Aragon, Spain. It is in the judicial district of Ejea de los Caballeros in the northeast of the province. It is 65 km from Zaragoza. According to the 2009 census (INE), the municipality has a population of 861 inhabitants.

== History ==
The location of the city was conquered by Christians in 1092–1093.

== Main sights ==
- Castillo de Villaverde
- Castillo de Obano
- Castillo de Yéquera
- Parochial church of San Gil de Mediavilla
- Santuario de Nuestra Señora de Monlora

== See also ==
- List of municipalities in Zaragoza
