= List of viceroys of Naples =

Map of the Kingdom of Naples (in dark yellow).

This is a list of viceroys of the Kingdom of Naples. Following the French conquest of Naples by Louis XII of France in 1501, the kingdom came under foreign rule—first briefly by the Kings of France, and later by Spain and the Habsburg Archdukes of Austria. As these monarchs usually resided far from Naples, the kingdom was administered through a series of appointed viceroys.

Name	Reign	Notes
French rule (1501–1504)
Louis of Armagnac, Duke of Nemours	1501–1503	Viceroy under King Louis XII of France. Fell in the Battle of Cerignola.
Ludovico II, Marquess of Saluzzo	1503–1504	Viceroy of Naples under King Louis XII of France
Under the Crown of Aragon (1504–1707)
Gonzalo Fernández de Córdoba (1453–1515)	1504–1507	Viceroy under King Ferdinand III.
Juan de Aragón y de Jonqueras, 2nd count of Ribagorza	1507–1509	
Antonio de Guevara	1509	Viceroy under King Ferdinand III
Ramón de Cardona	1509–1511	Viceroy of Sicily under King Ferdinand III
Cardinal Francisco de Remolins	1511–1513	Viceroy under King Ferdinand III and Pope Julius II (papal fief)
Ramón de Cardona	1513–1522	Viceroy under King Ferdinand III
Charles de Lannoy,	1522–1523	under Charles V.
Andrea Carafa	1523–1526	under Charles V
Ludovico Montalto	1526–1527	under Charles V
Hugo of Moncada	1527 – May 1528	Viceroy of Sicily, 1509–1517, under King Ferdinand II of Aragon, Viceroy of Naples, 1527–1528, Charles V
Philibert of Châlon, Prince of Orange	1528–3 August 1530	Viceroy under Charles V.
Pompeo Colonna	1530–1532	Viceroy under Charles V
Pedro Álvarez de Toledo	1532–1553	Viceroy under Charles V
Luis Álvarez de Toledo y Osorio	February – May 1553	Lieutenant-General under Charles V. Succeeded his father Pedro when he retired due to illness.
Pedro Pacheco Ladrón de Guevara	1553–1556	Viceroy under Charles V and Philip II of Spain.
Fernando Álvarez de Toledo	1556–1558	Governor of the Duchy of Milan, 1555–1556, Viceroy of Naples 1556–1557 under Philip II of Spain.
Juan Fernandez Manrique de Lara	6 June – 10 October 1558	Viceroy of Catalonia, 1543–1554, under Charles V, Viceroy of Naples, June to October 1558, under King Philip II of Spain.
Pedro Afán de Ribera	1559–1571	Viceroy of Catalonia, 1554–1558, Viceroy of Naples 1559–1571, under King Philip II of Spain.
Antoine Perrenot de Granvelle	1571–1575	Viceroy under King Philip II of Spain.
Íñigo López de Mendoza y Mendoza	1575–1579	Viceroy of Valencia, 1572–1575, Viceroy of Naples under King Philip II of Spain.
Juan de Zúñiga y Requesens	1579–1582	Viceroy under King Philip II of Spain.
Pedro Girón, 1st Duke of Osuna	1582–1586	Viceroy of Naples under King Philip II of Spain.
Juan de Zúñiga y Avellaneda	1586–1595	Viceroy under King Philip II of Spain. Also Viceroy of Catalonia, 1583–1586 and 1st Duke of Peñaranda de Duero.
Enrique de Guzmán, 2nd Count of Olivares	1595–1598	Viceroy under King Philip II of Spain
Fernando Ruiz de Castro Andrade y Portugal	1599–1601	Viceroy under King Philip III of Spain.
Francisco Ruiz de Castro	1601–1603	Viceroy under King Philip III of Spain.
Juan Alonso Pimentel de Herrera, 5th Duke of Benavente	1603–1610	Viceroy of Valencia, 1598–1602, Viceroy of Naples, 1603–1610, under King Philip III of Spain.
Pedro Fernández de Castro Andrade y Portugal	1610–1616	Viceroy under King Philip III of Spain.
Pedro Téllez-Girón, 3rd Duke of Osuna	1616–1620	Viceroy under King Philip III of Spain.
Gaspar Cardinal Borgia	June – December 1620	Archbishop of Seville, February 1632 – January 1645, Archbishop of Toledo 1645, Lieutenant-General of Naples under King Philip III of Spain.
Antonio Zapata y Cisneros	December 1620 – December 1622	Inquisitor-general of Spain, 1627–1632. Lieutenant-General under Kings Philip III and Philip IV of Spain
Antonio Álvarez de Toledo, 5th Duke of Alba	1622–1629	Knight of the Order of the Golden Fleece, 1599. Viceroy under King Philip IV of Spain
Fernando Afán de Ribera y Téllez-Girón	1629–1631	Viceroy under King Philip IV of Spain.
Manuel de Acevedo y Zúñiga	1631–1637	Viceroy under King Philip IV of Spain.
Ramiro Núñez de Guzmán	1637–1644	Viceroy under King Philip IV of Spain. He was the son in law, since 1625, of the Spanish PM Gaspar de Guzmán, Count-Duke of Olivares
Juan Alfonso Enríquez de Cabrera	1644–1646	Viceroy of Sicily, 1641–1644, Viceroy of Naples under King Philip IV of Spain
Rodrigo Ponce de León, 4th Duke of Arcos	1646–1648	Viceroy of Valencia, 1642–1645. Under his rule the "Neapolitan Republic" rebellion by Masaniello broke out
John of Austria	January 1648 – March 1648	Viceroy under King Philip IV of Spain, bastard son of the ruling Spanish King, sent to Naples to crush the Neapolitan Revolt.
Íñigo Vélez de Guevara, 8th Count of Oñate	1648–1653	Head of the Imperial Post Office Services, Viceroy of Naples under King Philip IV of Spain.
García de Haro-Sotomayor y Guzmán	1654–1659	President of the Council of Italy, Viceroy under King Philip IV of Spain.
Gaspar de Bracamonte, 3rd Count of Peñaranda	1659–1664	Viceroy under King Philip IV of Spain
Pascual Cardinal de Aragon	1664–1666	Viceroy under Kings Philip IV and Charles II of Spain
Pedro Antonio de Aragón	1666–1671	Viceroy under King Charles II of Spain
Fadrique Alvarez de Toledo y Ponce de León	1671–1672	Viceroy of Sicily, 1673–1676, Lieutenant-General under King Charles II of Spain. Knight of the Order of the Holy Spirit, France, 1703.
Antonio Pedro Sancho Dávila y Osorio	1672–1675	Viceroy under King Charles II of Spain
Fernando Joaquín Fajardo de Requeséns y Zúñiga, 6th Marquis of Los Velez	1675–1683	Viceroy under King Charles II of Spain
Gaspar Méndez de Haro, 7th Marquis of Carpio	1683–1687	Viceroy under King Charles II of Spain
Francisco de Benavides	1687–1696	Viceroy under King Charles II of Spain
Luis Francisco de la Cerda y Aragón	1696–1702	Viceroy under Kings Charles II of Spain and Philip V of Spain
Juan Manuel Fernández Pacheco, 8th Marquis of Villena	1702–1707	Viceroy of Navarre, 1691–1692, Viceroy of Aragón, 1693, Viceroy of Catalonia, 1693–1694, Viceroy of Sicily, 1701–1702, 1st Director of the Royal Spanish Academy, 1713–1725. Knight of the Order of the Golden Fleece, 1687. Viceroy under King Philip V of Spain from 1702 onwards.
Austrian rule (1707–1734)
Georg Adam von Martinitz	July – October 1707	Viceroy under King Joseph I.
Wirich Philipp von Daun	1707–1708 (first time)	1724: Governor of the Austrian Netherlands, formerly Spanish Netherlands, Governor of Milan, 1728–1733. Viceroy of Naples under King Joseph I.
Vincenzo Grimani	1708–1710	Viceroy under King Joseph I.
Carlo Borromeo Arese	1710–1713	Viceroy under King Joseph I and under King Charles VI.
Wirich Philipp von Daun	1713–1719 (second time)	Viceroy under King Charles VI, 2nd time.
Johann Wenzel Count of Gallas	July 1719	Viceroy under King Charles VI
Wolfgang Hannibal Count of Schrattenbach	1719–1721	Viceroy under King Charles VI
Marcantonio Borghese, 3rd Prince of Sulmona	1721–1722	Viceroy of Naples under King Charles VI
Michael Friedrich von Althan	1722–1728	Viceroy under King Charles VI. Anti-Austrian rioting breaks out in Naples, 1723.
Joaquín Fernández de Portocarrero	July – December 1728	Viceroy of Naples and also Viceroy of Sicily, 1722–1728, under King Charles VI.
Aloys Thomas Raimund Count of Harrach	1728–1733	Viceroy under King Charles VI.
Giulio Visconti Borromeo Arese, conte di Brebbia	1733–1734	In 1707 he had been awarded a Grandee of Spain title, 2nd class, by Philip V of Spain. Viceroy under King Charles VI.

== Sources ==
- Giovan Pietro Bellori: The Lives of the Modern Painters, Sculptors and Architects
