= Admiral of Castile =

Representative of King of Castile

Admiral of Castile was the representative of the King of Castile at the head of the Navy. It was a dignity created in 1247 that lasted until 1705.

== Admiral of Castile ==
The title of Admiral of Castile was created by King Ferdinand III the Saint in 1247 for the successful Siege of Seville, appointing Ramón de Bonifaz to that position.

After the conquest of Seville, this title was covered with great authority, power and pre-eminence, which are specified by Alfonso X the Wise in the Siete Partidas. The Admiral resided in Seville, because the Royal Shipyards were constructed there and it was the place where the fleets were armed and organized and where the special maritime court was also located. Among the multiple attributions and powers of the admiral, they included having a voice and casting vote in the Council of Castile.

From 1405 to 1705, this position became the heritage of the Enríquez family, descendants of the infante Fadrique Alfonso, natural son of King Alfonso XI of Castile. The first of this family to hold the Admiralty was Alfonso Enríquez, by concession of Henry III of Castile.

In the fifteenth century, the institution of the Admiral of Castile lost its importance. The Admiral became a palace man and stopped participating personally in the naval wars, while the Castilian navy was transformed, replacing the royal galleys with private sailing ships, hired for each campaign.

== Admirals of Castile ==
The following is a list of people who held this title:

Admiral	Notes
Ramón Bonifaz	After 1247.
Ruy López de Mendoza	Post held from 1253 and 1262.
Fernando Gutiérrez	Between 1262 and 1269.
Pedro Martínez de Fee	
Pedro Laso de la Vega	
Payo Gómez Cherino	
Pedro Ruiz de Castañeda	
Nuño Díaz de Castañeda	died in 1293. Brother of predecessor.
Benedetto Zaccaria (called Micer Benito Zacarías in Spanish)	Died in 1295. Genoese admiral, also in service of the Kingdom of France and the Byzantine Empire.
Juan Matheo de Luna	Died in 1299.
Fernán Pérez Maymon	
Alonso Fernández de Montemolín	Sevillano.
Alvar Pérez	Abdicated in 1304.
Diego García de Toledo	Head of House of Magan and of Mejorada.
Diego Gutiérrez de Cevallos	
Bernal de Soria	Between 1307 and 1311.
Gilberto de Castelnou	Italian.
Alonso Jofre Tenorio	Died in 1340.
Alonso Ortiz Calderón	Gran Prior of the Knights Hospitaller. Renounced in 1341.
Egidio Boccanegra	Executed in 1367.
Ambrosio Bocanegra	Son of predecessor. Died in 1373.
Fernando Sánchez de Tovar	Noble from Berlanga. Died in 1382.
Juan Fernández de Tovar	Son of predecessor. Died in the Battle of Aljubarrota in 1385.
Rui Díaz de Mendoza	Noble of Mendivil. Died in 1390.
Álvaro Pérez de Guzmán	Died in 1392.
Diego Hurtado de Mendoza	Died in 1405.
Alonso Enríquez	1st Lord of Medina de Rioseco, son of Fadrique de Castilla. Died in 1429.
Fadrique Enríquez	Son of predecessor, 2nd Lord of Medina de Rioseco, 1st Count of Melgar, died in 1479.
Alonso Enríquez	Son of predecessor, 3rd Lord of Medina de Rioseco Died in 1485.
Fadrique Enríquez de Velasco	Son of predecessor, 4th Lord of Medina de Rioseco. Died without heirs in 1538.
Fernando Enríquez de Velasco	Brother of predecessor, 1st Duke of Medina de Rioseco, died in 1542.
Luis Enríquez y Téllez-Girón	Son of predecessor. Died in 1567.
Luis Enríquez de Cabrera	Son of predecessor. Died in 1596.
Luis Enríquez de Cabrera y Mendoza	Son of predecessor. Died in 1600.
Juan Alfonso Enríquez de Cabrera	Son of predecessor. Died in 1647.
Juan Gaspar Enríquez de Cabrera	Son of predecessor. Died in 1691.
Juan Tomás Enríquez de Cabrera	Son of predecessor. Felipe V dismissed him from his post for siding with Archduke Charles during the War of the Spanish Succession.

== Sources ==
- Spanish Army
