= Mayorga, Spain =

Mayorga
- Municipality
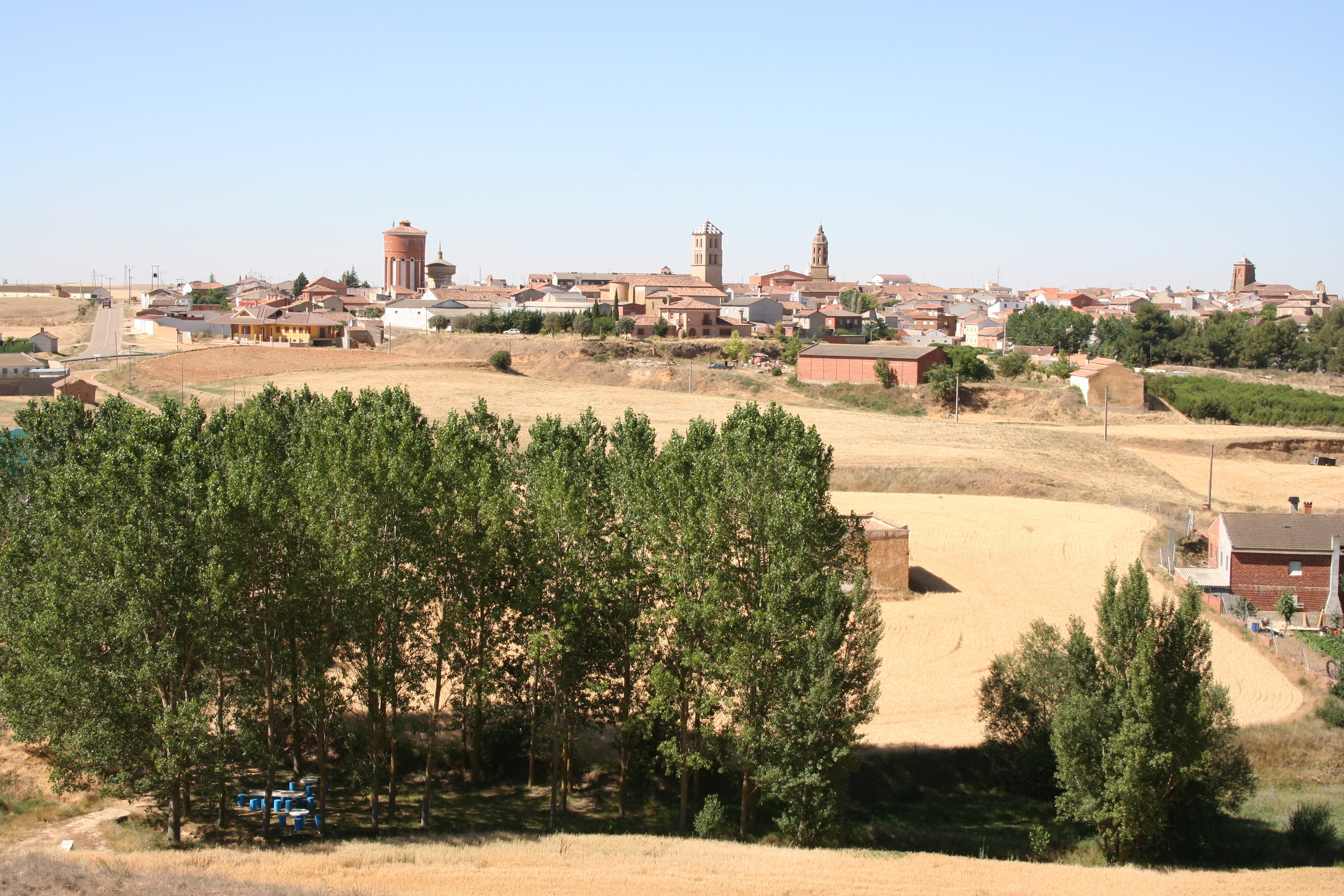
- General view of Mayorga

- Coat of arms
- Interactive map of Mayorga
- Location within Spain
- Coordinates: 42°10′0″N 5°15′46″W
- Country: Spain
- Autonomous community: Castile and León
- Province: Valladolid
- Municipality: Mayorga

Government
  - Mayor: David de la Viuda Rodríguez (PP)

Area
  - Total: 163.4 km^{2} (63.1 sq mi)
- Elevation: 774 m (2,539 ft)

Population (2025-01-01)
  - Total: 1,354
  - Density: 8.286/km^{2} (21.46/sq mi)
- Demonym(s): mayorgano, mayorgana
- Time zone: UTC+1 (CET)
  - Summer (DST): UTC+2 (CEST)
- Postal Code: 47680
- Website: Ayto. de Mayorga

Mayorga (Spanish pronunciation: [majjˈoɾɣa]), also known as Mayorga de Campos, is a municipality located in the north of the province of Valladolid, in the autonomous community of Castile and León, Spain. It belongs to the comarca of Tierra de Campos and the judicial district of Medina de Rioseco. According to the 2024 census (INE), it has a population of 1354 inhabitants. It covers an area of 163.4 square kilometres (63.09 sq mi).

According to some theories its name comes from the Leonese language, and there are several references to this village in the Middle Ages, in which Mayorga was a place in the Kingdom of León.

It was the birthplace of Saint Turibius de Mogrovejo.

Gallery

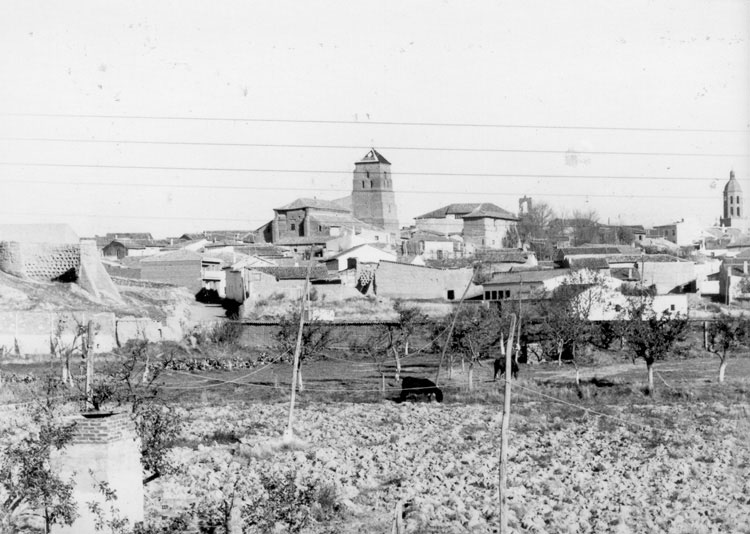
Mayorga in the mid-20th century

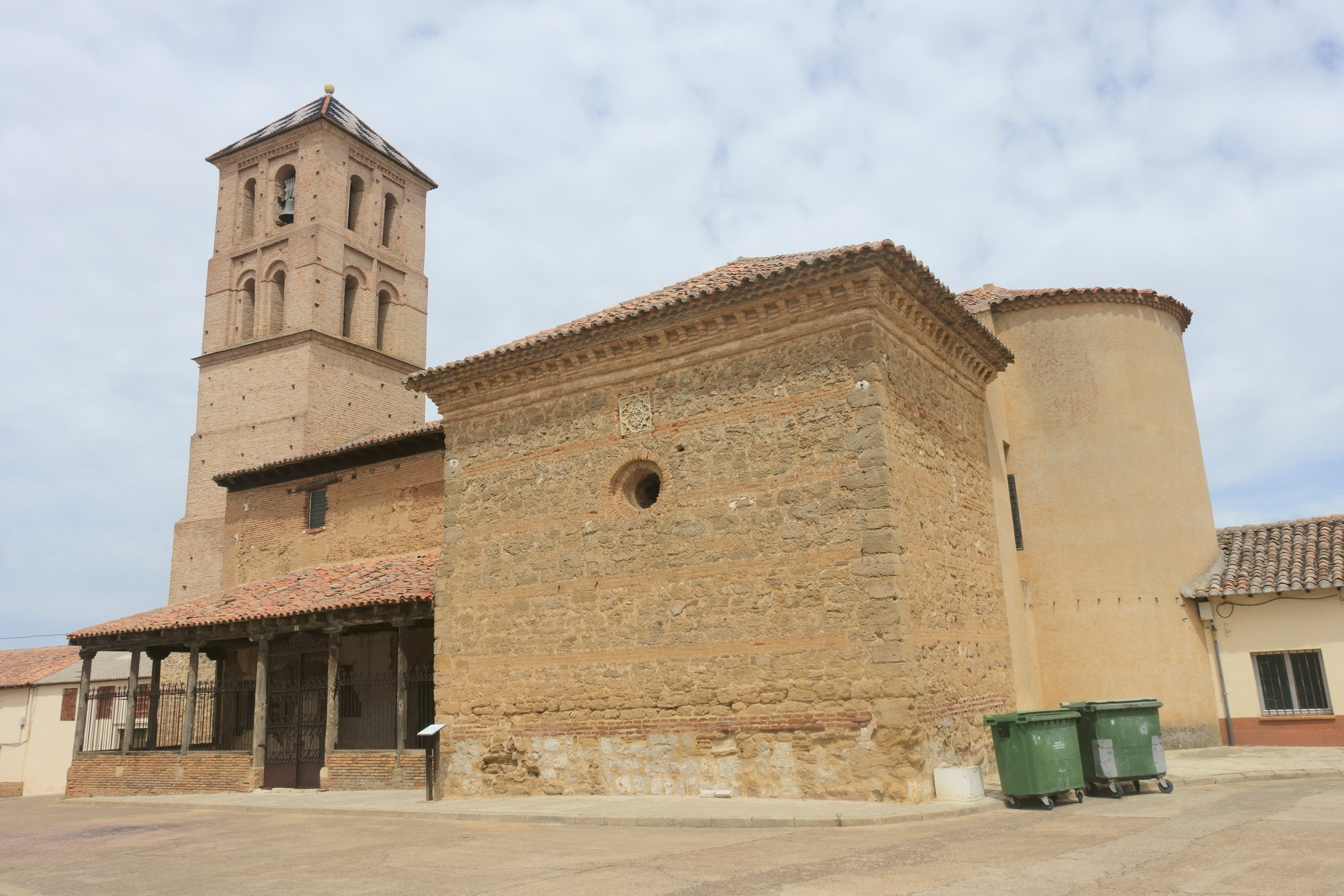
Santa María de Arbas Church, built in the 16th century

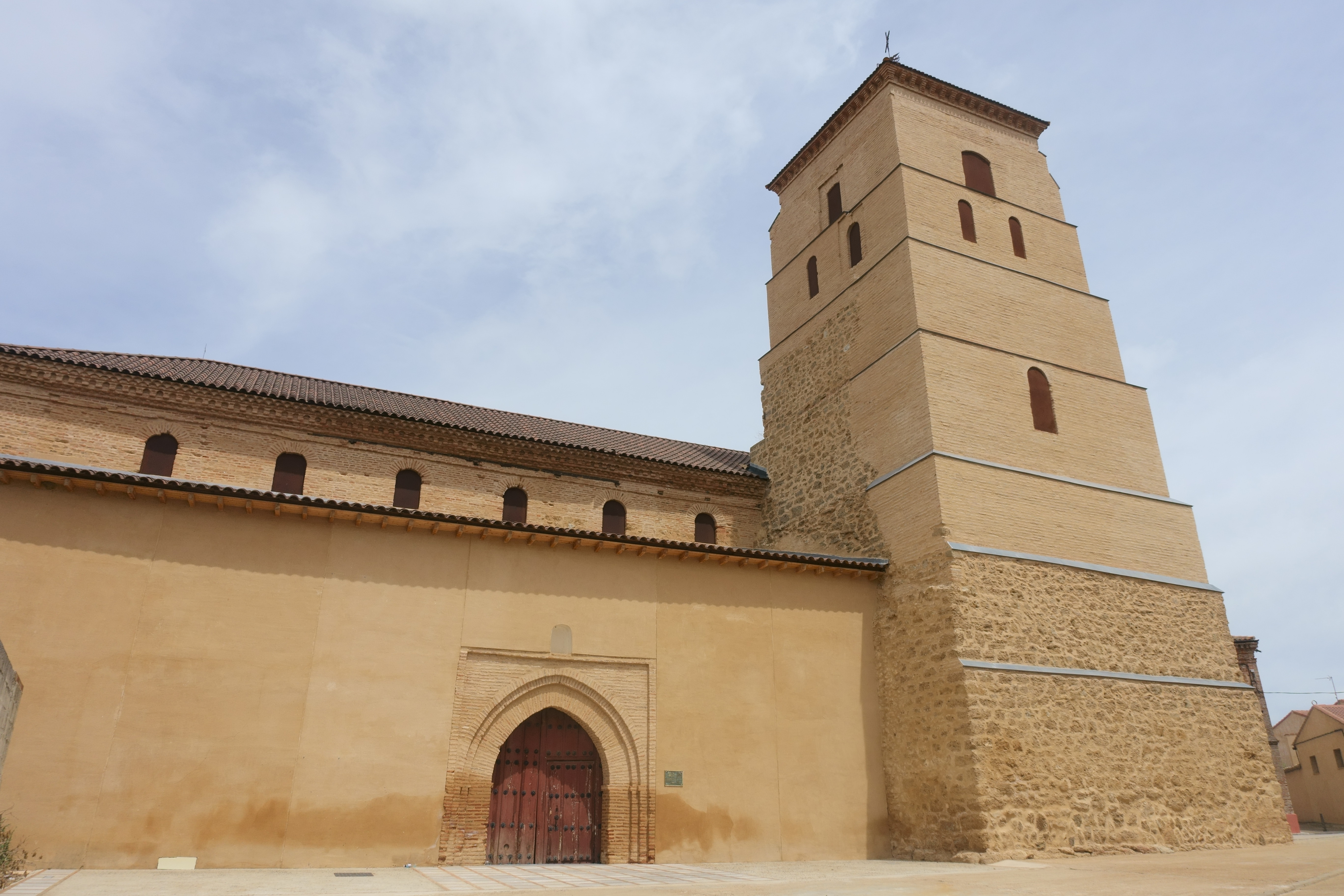
Santa María del Mercado Church, built in the 15th century

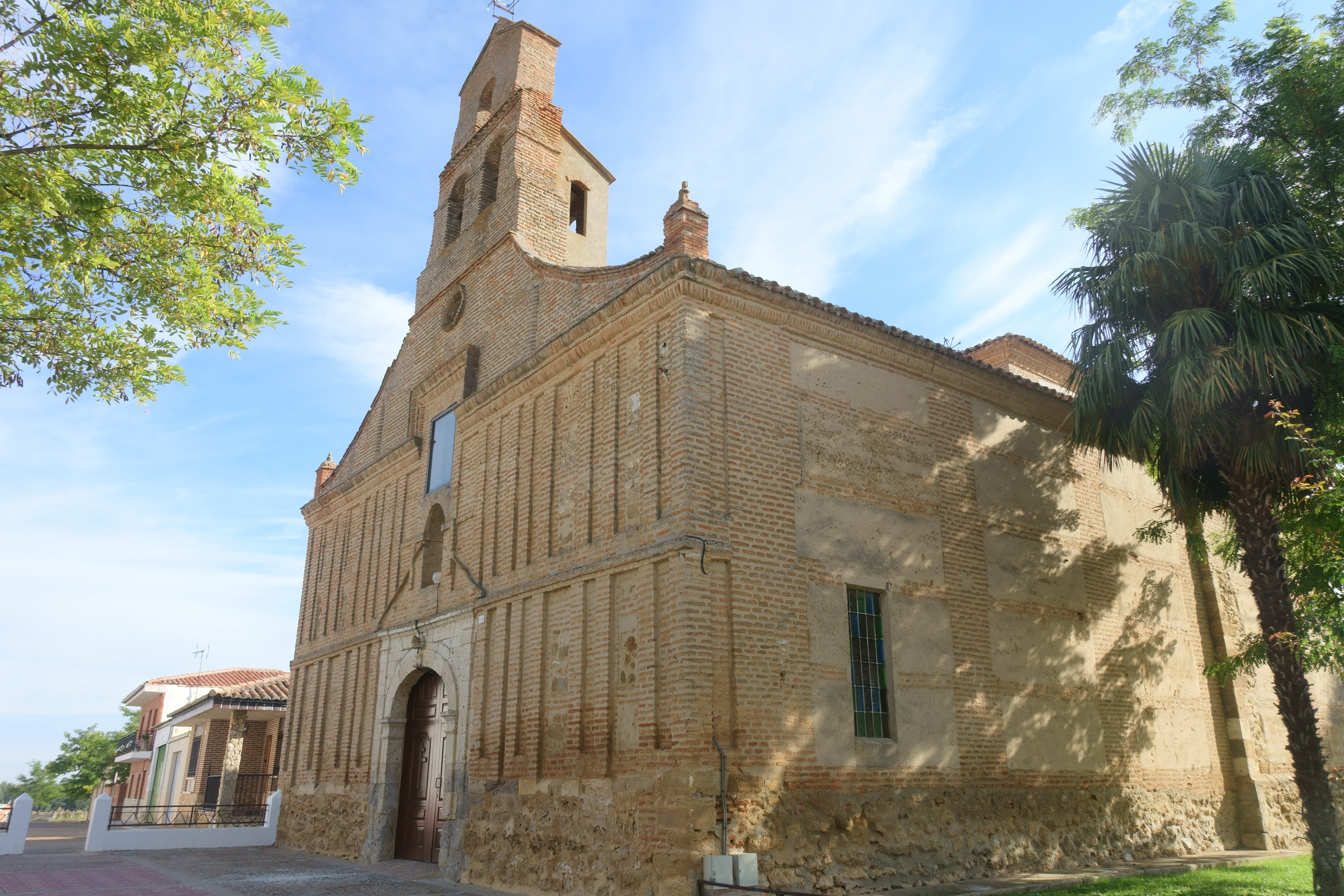
Santo Toribio Hermitage, built in the 18th century

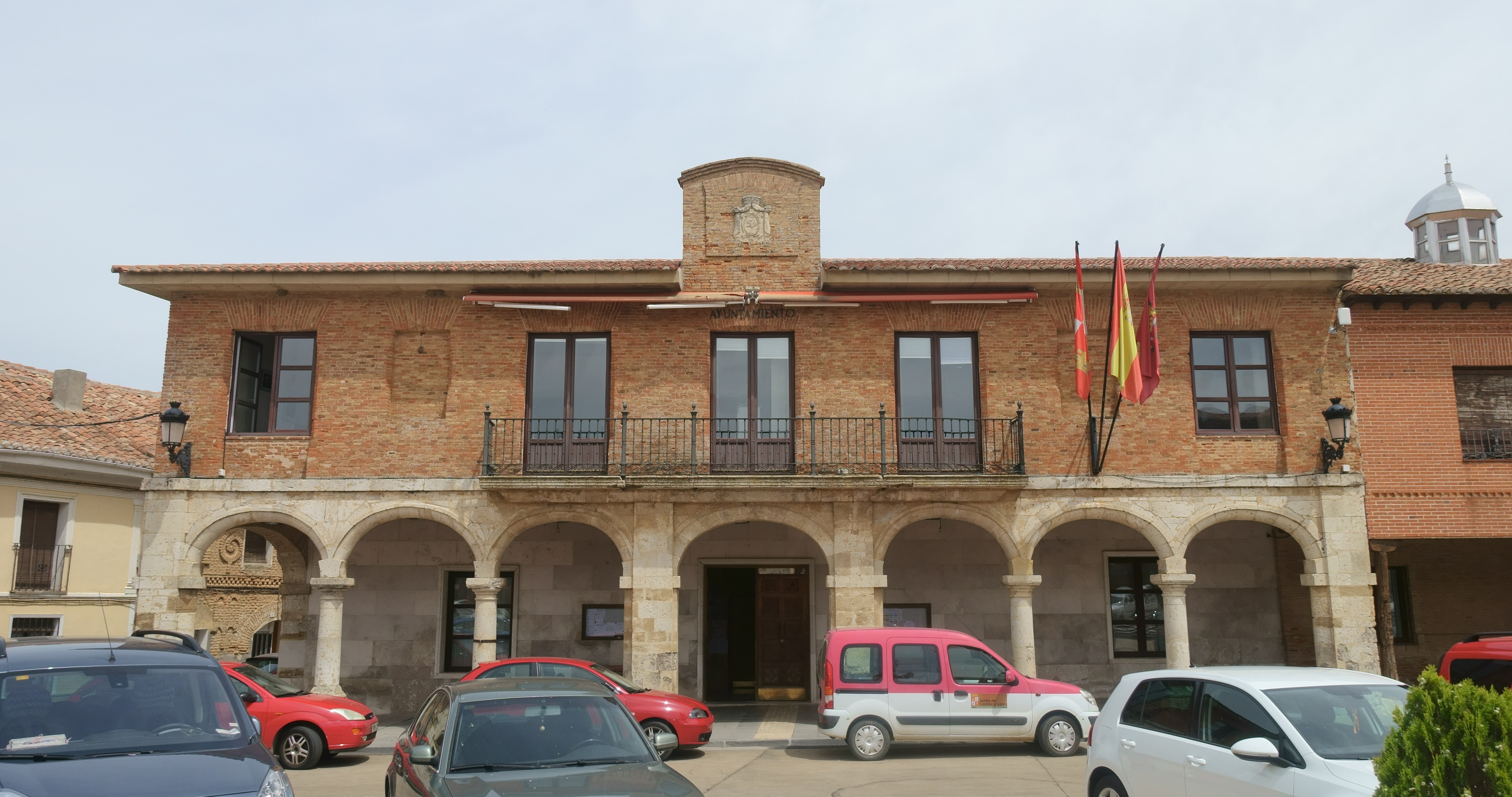
Mayorga Town Hall and arcades

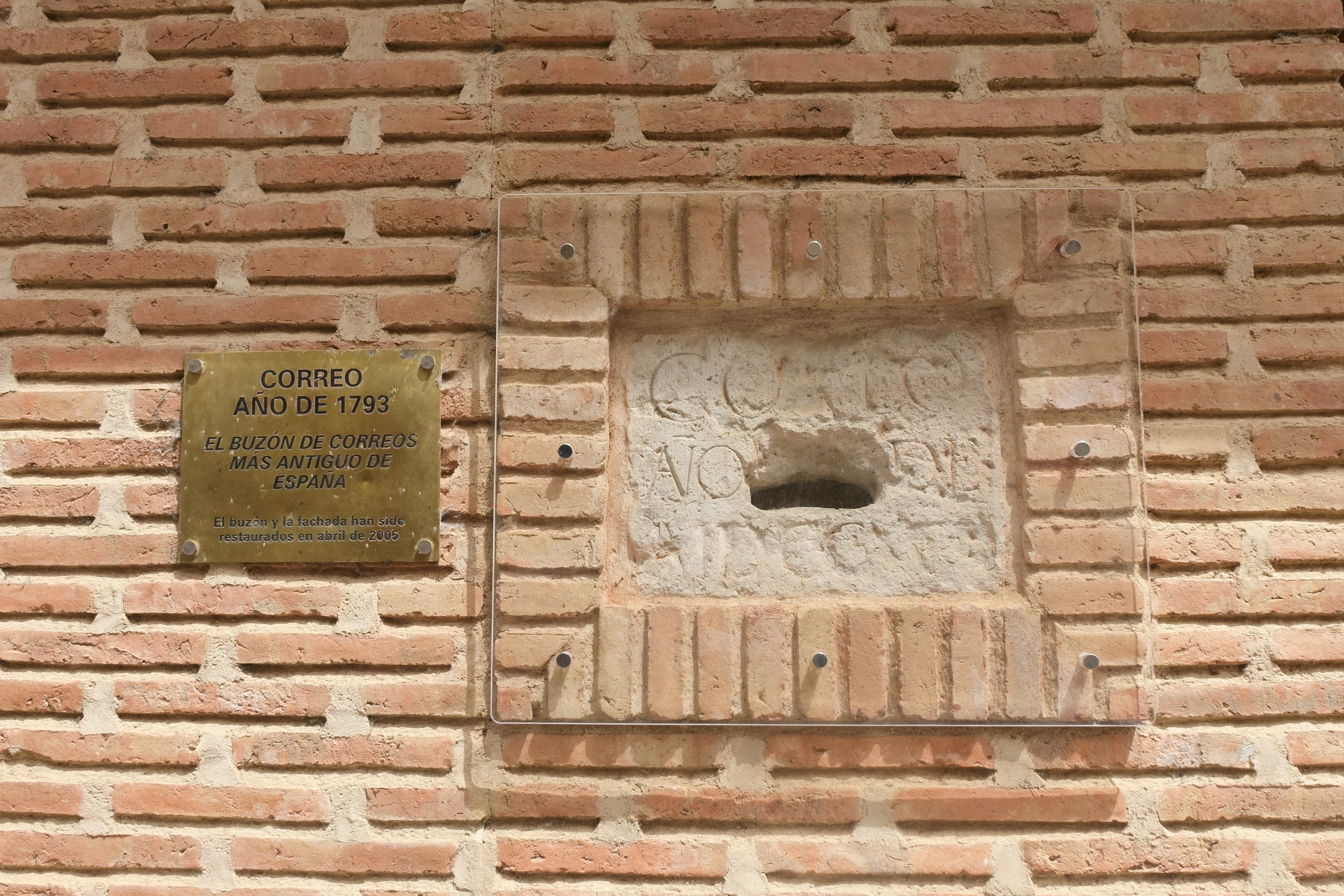
Mayorga 1793 post box, oldest in Spain

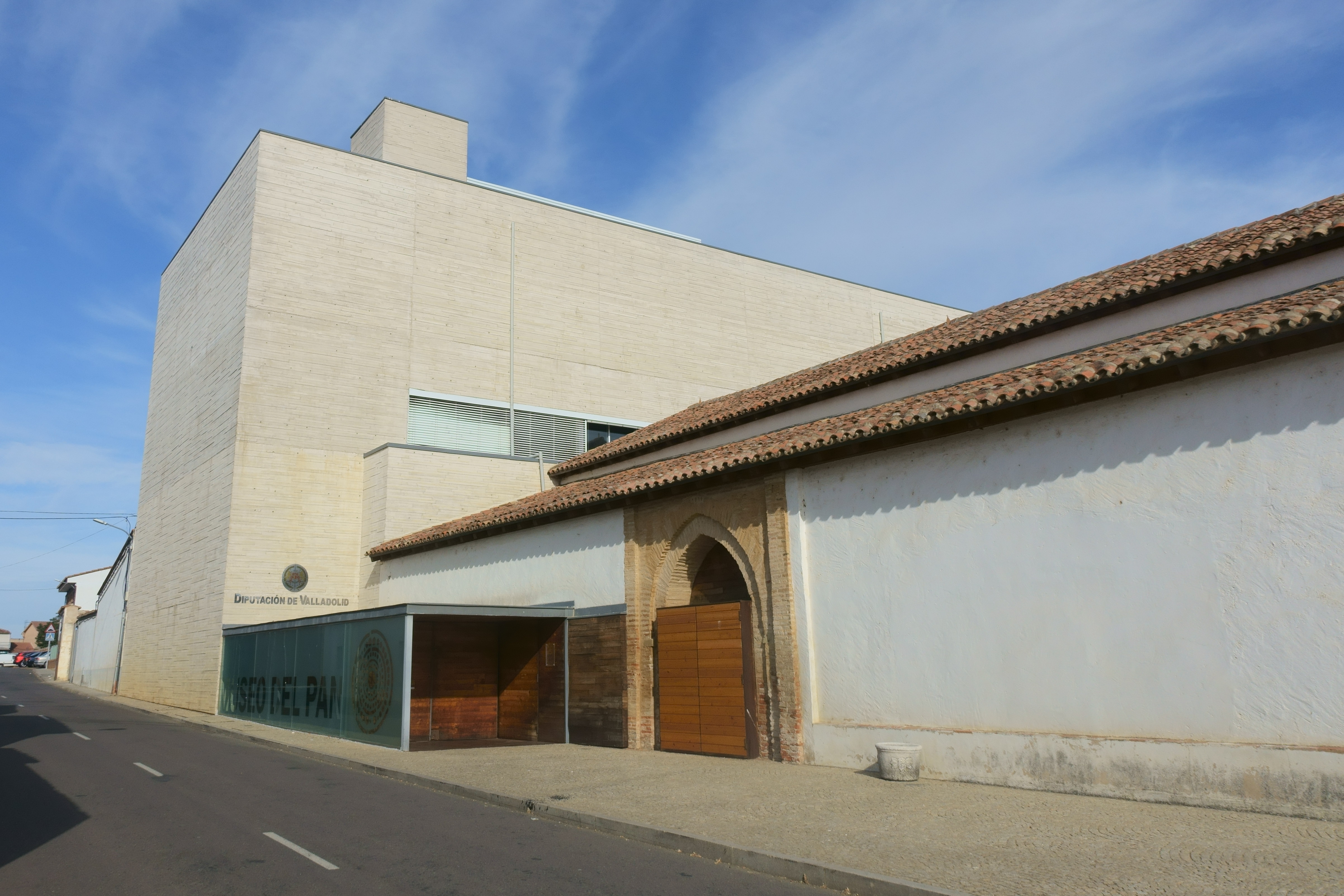
Museo del Pan (Bread Museum)

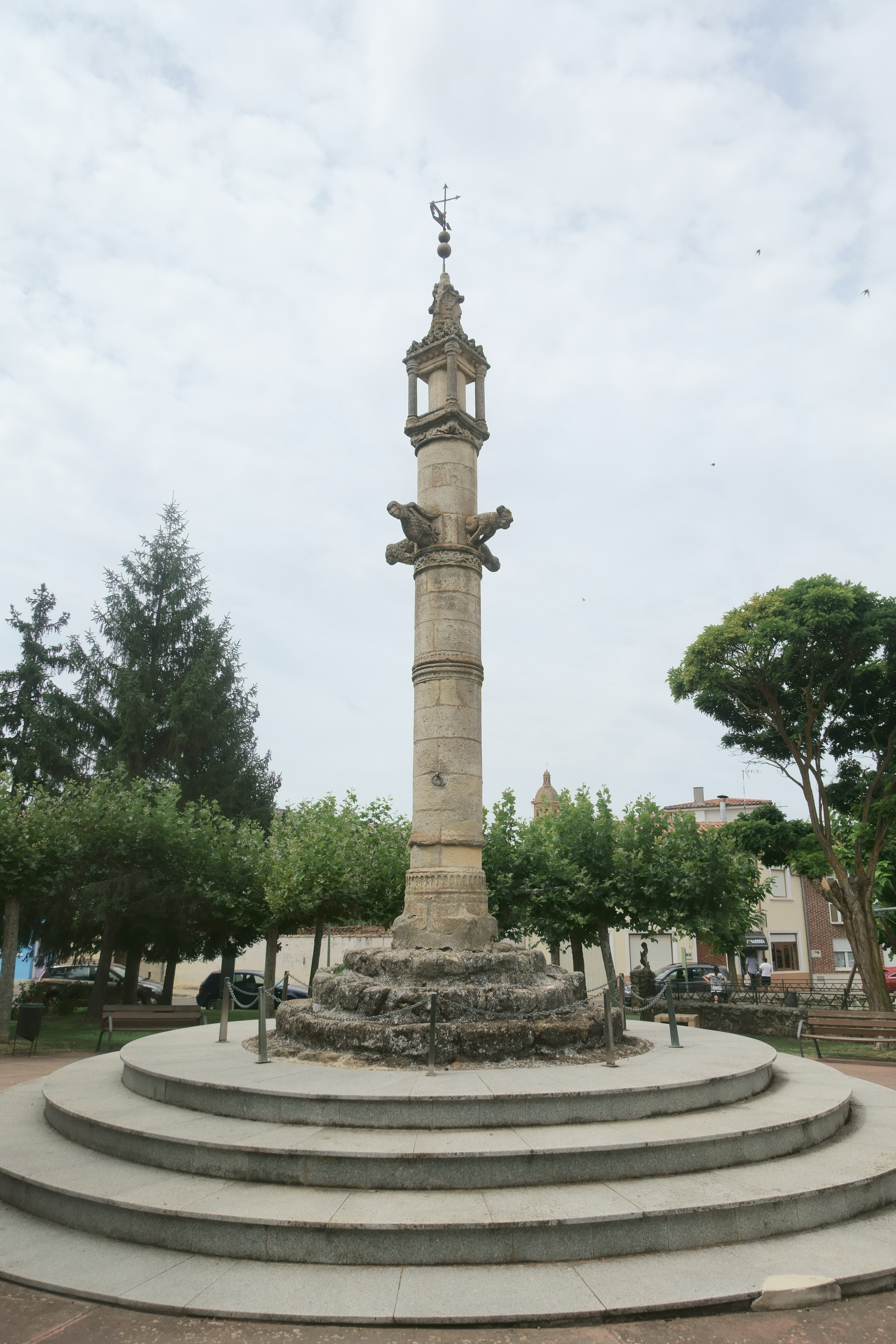
Mayorga justice pillory

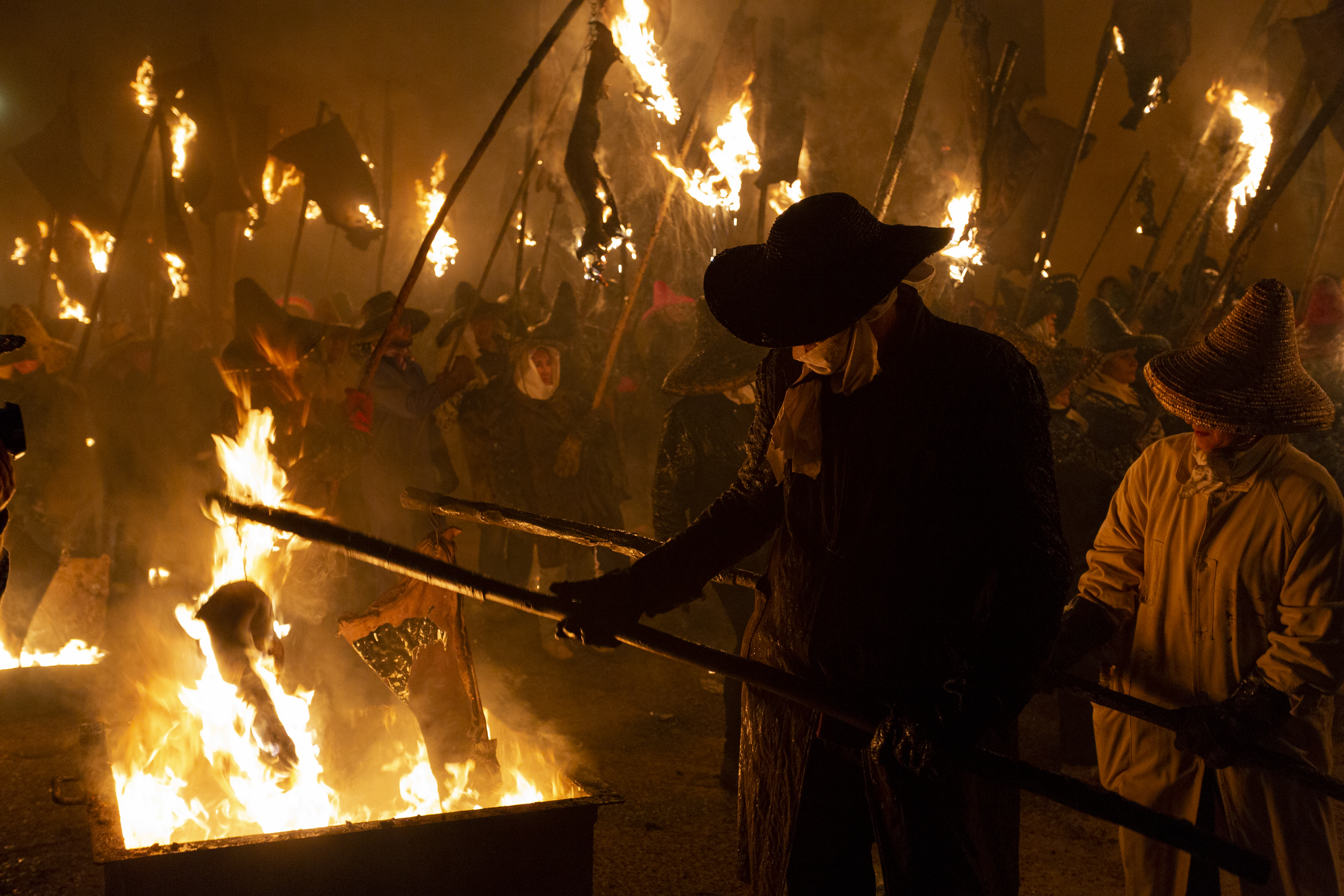
El Vítor festivity, declared of National Tourist Interest
