= Benavente, Zamora =

Place in Castile and León, Spain

Benavente
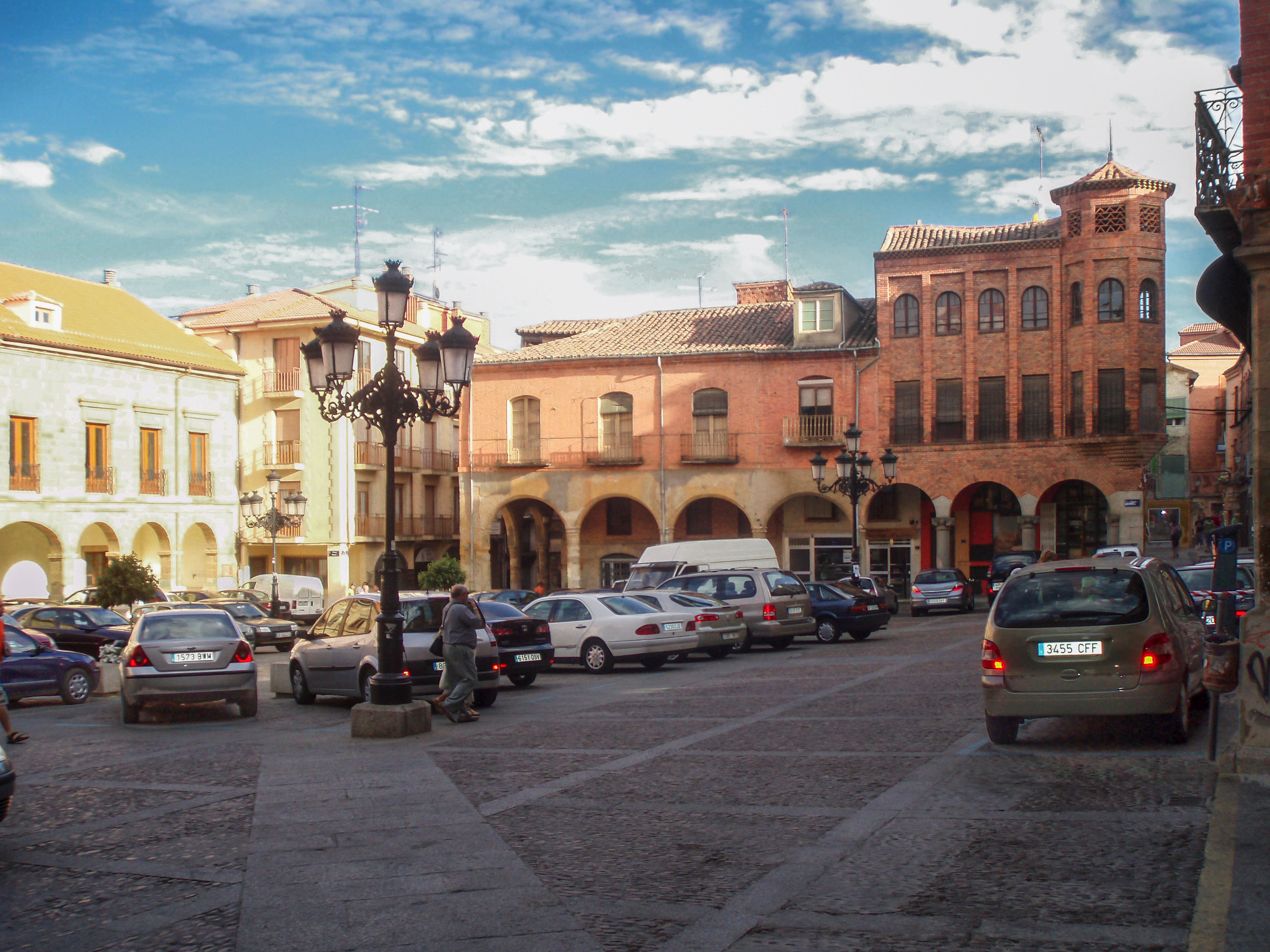
- Plaza del Ayuntamiento in Benavente.

- Flag Coat of arms
- Interactive map of Benavente
- Coordinates: 42°0′11″N 5°40′27″W
- Country: Spain
- Autonomous community: Castile and León
- Province: Zamora
- Comarca: Benavente y Los Valles

Government
  - Mayor: Luciano Huerga

Area
  - Total: 45.12 km^{2} (17.42 sq mi)
- Elevation: 800 m (2,600 ft)

Population (2025)
  - Total: 17,468
  - Density: 387.1/km^{2} (1,003/sq mi)
- Demonym: Benaventanos
- Time zone: UTC+1 (CET)
  - Summer (DST): UTC+2 (CEST)
- Climate: Csb
- Website: Official website

Benavente is a town and municipality in the north of the province of Zamora, in the autonomous community Castile and León of Spain. It has about 20,000 inhabitants.

Located north of the capital on an important communications hub, it was repopulated by King Ferdinand II of León, who also awarded it law-codes (a fuero) in 1167. It was originally known as Malgrat or Malgrado.

== History ==
=== 12th century - Catholic Monarchs ===
After the death of Fernando II of León who renamed the town from Malgrat to Benavente and led a campaign in 1164 to repopulate the city, as part of a long process of reconquest from the Moors. Alfonso IX and Alfonso X continued to help the growth of Benavente through privileges and grants. When Alfonso IX of León died, the town was the scene of the definitive union of the Crowns of León and Castile in the Concordia of Benavente, later falling into decline until Sancho IV promoted its aggrandizement in 1285, attracting new settlers with franchises.

In 1352 Fadrique Alfonso, brother of King Pedro I, received the town in exchange for not attacking Pedro. In 1387 Benavente was surrounded by the English and Portuguese troops of the Duchy of Lancaster who tried to besiege it, and the besiegers were defeated in this attempt.

== Location ==
Benavente is located in the North of Province of Zamora, in the North-West of Spain. It is 65 km away from Zamora City and 260 km from Madrid and its coordinates are 42° 0' N 5° 41' W. The adjacent municipalities of Benavente are Villanueva de Azoague, Manganeses de la Polvorosa, Santa Cristina de la Polvorosa, Villabrázaro, San Cristóbal de Entreviñas, Castrogonzalo, Santa Colomba de las Monjas and Arcos de la Polvorosa, all of them belonging to Province of Zamora.

North-West: Manganeses de la Polvorosa	North: Villabrázaro	North-East: San Cristóbal de Entreviñas
West: Santa Cristina de la Polvorosa		East: San Cristóbal de Entreviñas
South-West:Santa Cristina de la Polvorosa	South: Villanueva de Azoague, Santa Colomba de las Monjas and Arcos de la Polvorosa	South-East: Castrogonzalo

== Transport ==
=== Roads and Highways ===
Benavente is connected to the national road network through different roads and highways:

- A-66 · Autovía Ruta de la Plata: Gijón - Oviedo - Mieres - Puerto Pajares - León - Benavente - Zamora - Salamanca - Béjar - Plasencia - Cáceres - Mérida - Sevilla.
- A-6 · Autovía del Noroeste. Madrid - Benavente - Lugo - A Coruña - Arteixo
- Autovía A-52 · Autovía de las Rías Bajas. Benavente - Sanabria - Verín - Ourense - Vigo .
- N-610 · Palencia-Benavente.

Towns	Distance (km)
Toro	69
Villalpando	30
Puebla de Sanabria	84
Salamanca	134
Zamora	65
Tordesillas	80
Medina de Rioseco	62
Medina del Campo	105
Valladolid	112
Valencia de Don Juan	33
La Bañeza	37
Astorga	65
Ponferrada	124
León	70
Palencia	90
Segovia	235
Ávila	190
Burgos	210
Oviedo	182
Madrid	266
Ourense	238
Gijón	210
Soria	318
Vitoria-Gasteiz	347
Porto	334
Bilbao	388
Lisbon	600
Barcelona	836

=== Bus Services ===
Bus services are provided in the Bus Station by different companies like Alsa, Auto-Res, Empresa Vivas, Linecar or Autocares Julio Fernández. There is a taxi stand in the Bus Station.

==== National lines ====
Daily services to: A Coruña, Astorga, Algeciras, Asturias (Oviedo-Gijón), Ávila, Badajoz, Barcelona, Bilbao, Cáceres, Cádiz, Cangas de Narcea, Irún, La Bañeza, León, Lugo, Logroño, Málaga, Madrid, Mérida, Ourense, Monforte, Palencia, Plasencia, Ponferrada, Pontevedra, Salamanca, San Fernando, San Sebastián, Santiago de Compostela, Sevilla, Valladolid, Verín, Vigo, Villablino, Zafra, Zamora and Zaragoza.

==== International lines ====
- Switzerland
- Germany
- Belgium
- Holland
- France - (París)
- France (Lyon - Grenoble)
- Andorra

==== Regional lines ====
- Alcubilla de Nogales
- Alija del Infantado
- Arcos de la Polvorosa
- Ayoo de Vidriales
- Camarzana de Tera
- Carracedo - 13:00
- Cubo de Benavente
- Ferreras de Abajo
- Milles de la Polvorosa
- Molezuelas
- Mozar
- Puebla de Sanabria
- Pueblica de Valverde
- Santa Colomba de las Monjas
- Santibáñez de Vidriales
- Tábara
- Uña de Quintana
- Valle del Tera
- Valderas
- Villafáfila
- Villalpando
- Villanueva de Azoague
- Villarrín de Campos

==== Local Service ====
Senior citizens have a free urban bus service.

=== Taxi ===
The town has several taxi stands, one of them in the Bus Station.

== Demographics ==
The total population of Benavente in 2025 are 17,468, up from 17,246 in 2024 and 17,261 in 2023. The sexes were 52% women and 48% men.

=== Nationality ===
Over 90.5% (15,803) of the population were Spanish nationals, with 9.5% (1,665) born outside Spain with Moroccans the most numerous at 363 (21.8% of all foreign nationals), Colombians were 264, Bulgarians 219 and 175 Romanians.

== Plaza mayor ==
The main square is plaza mayor where the Town hall building is located.

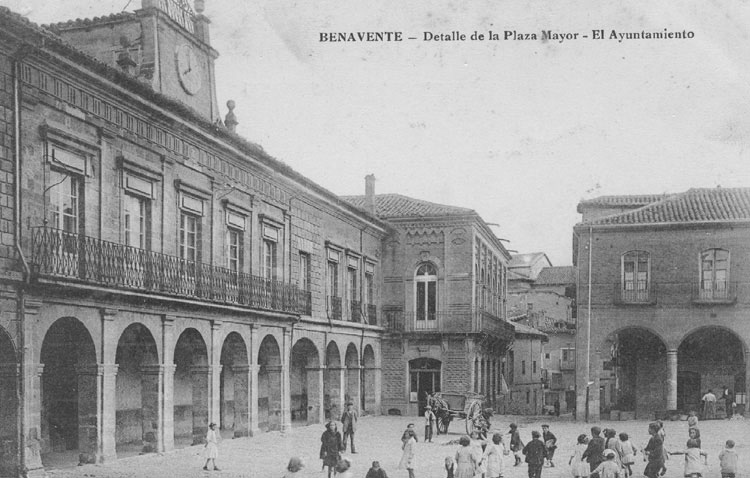

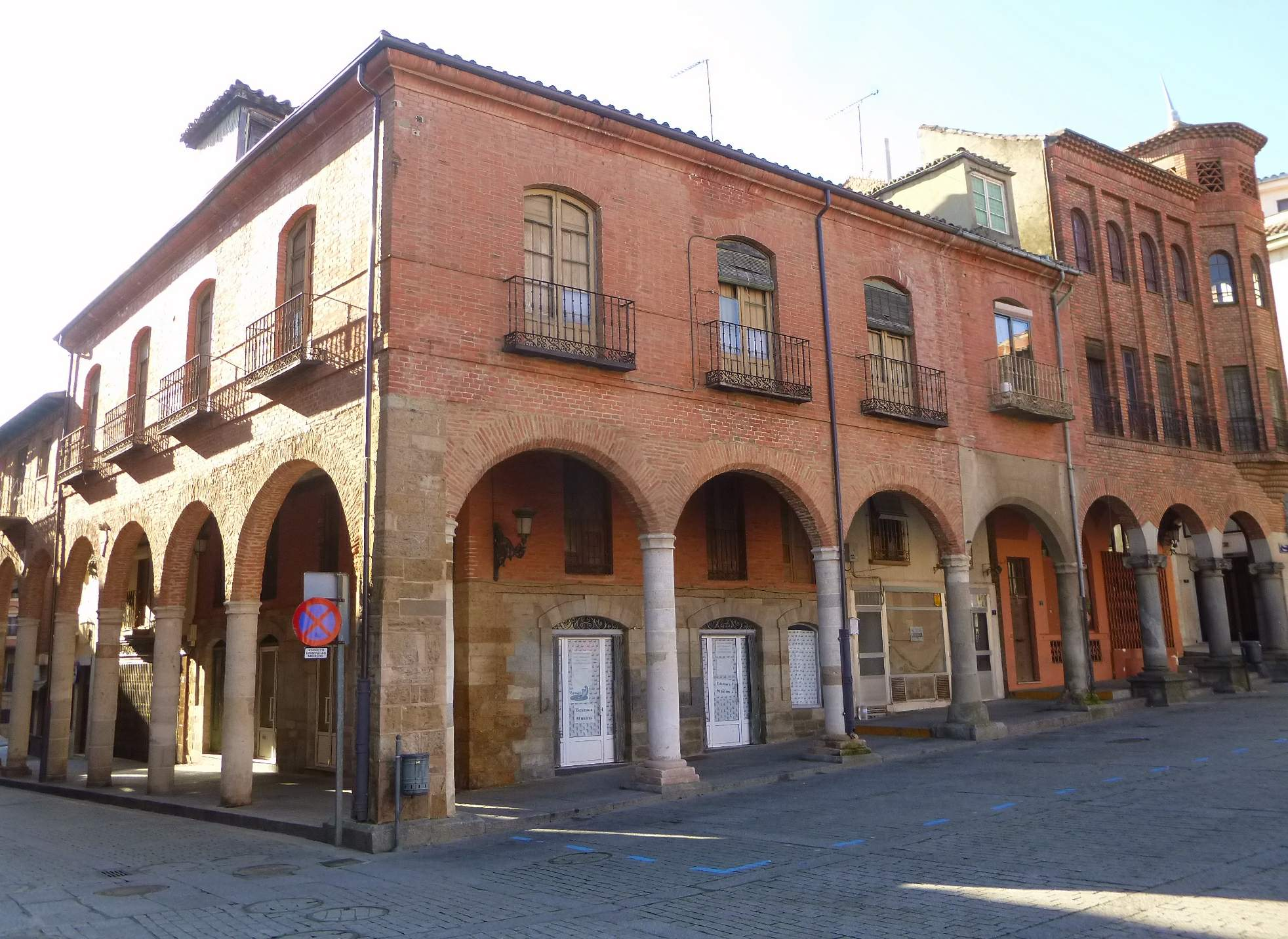

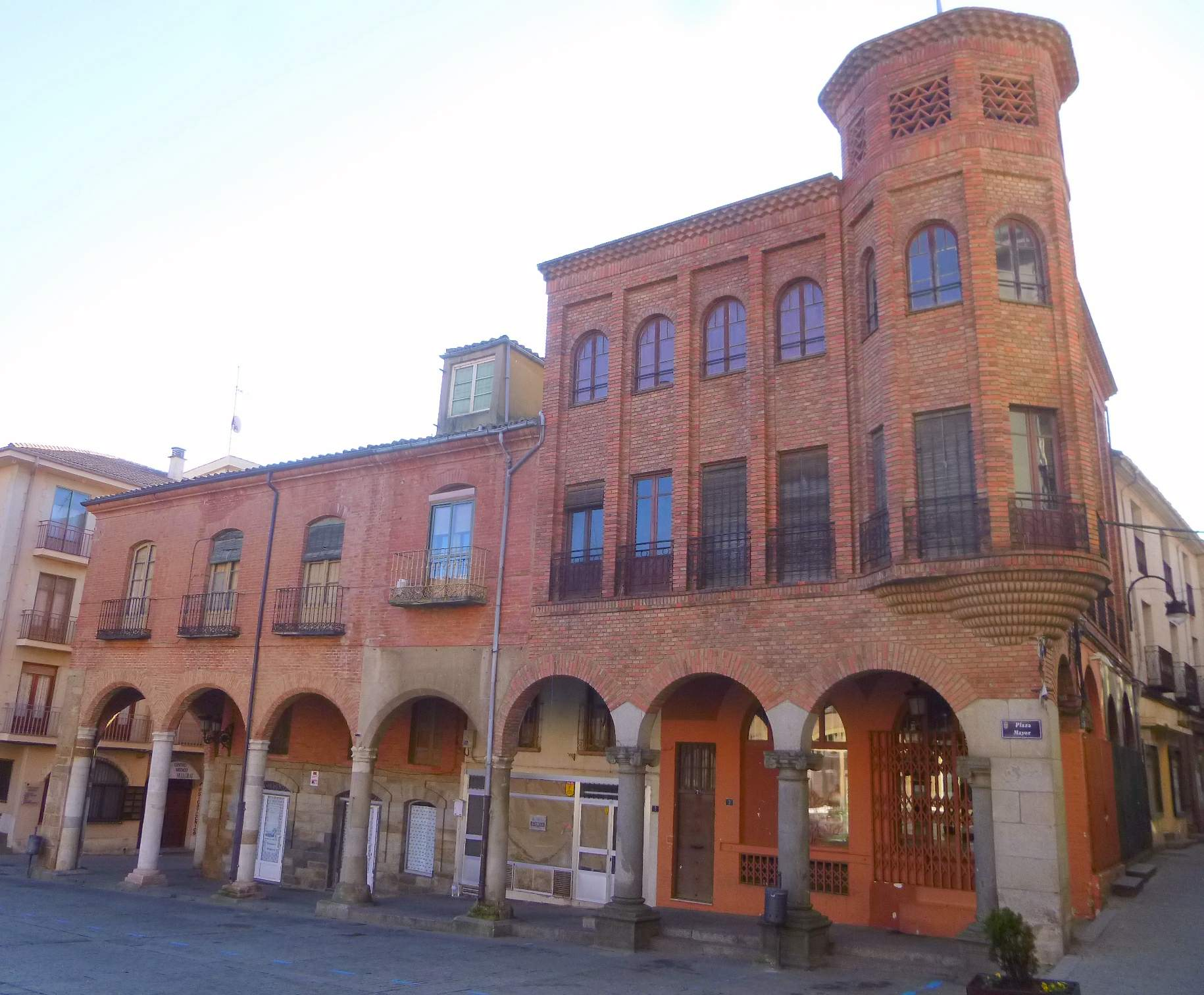

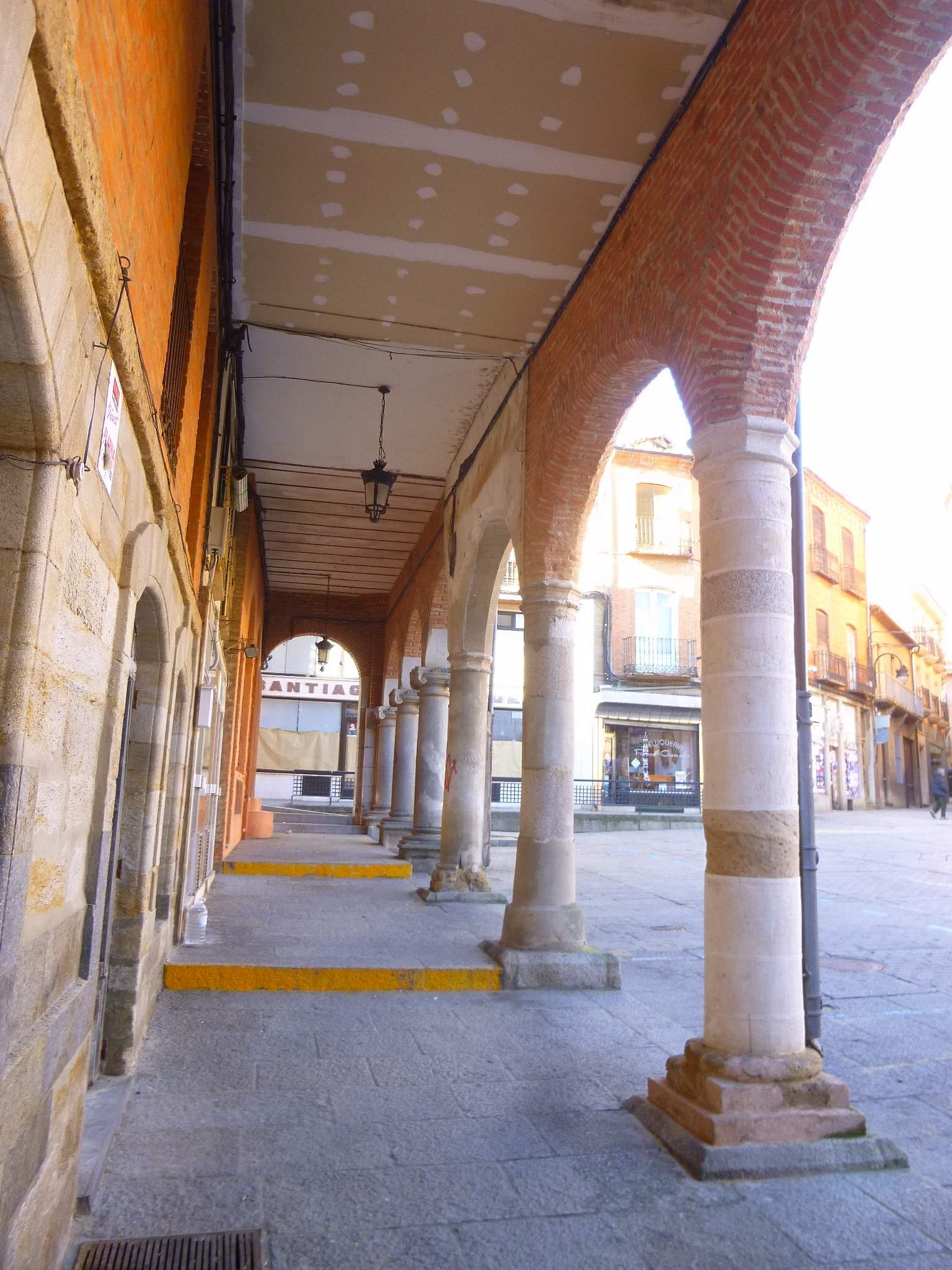

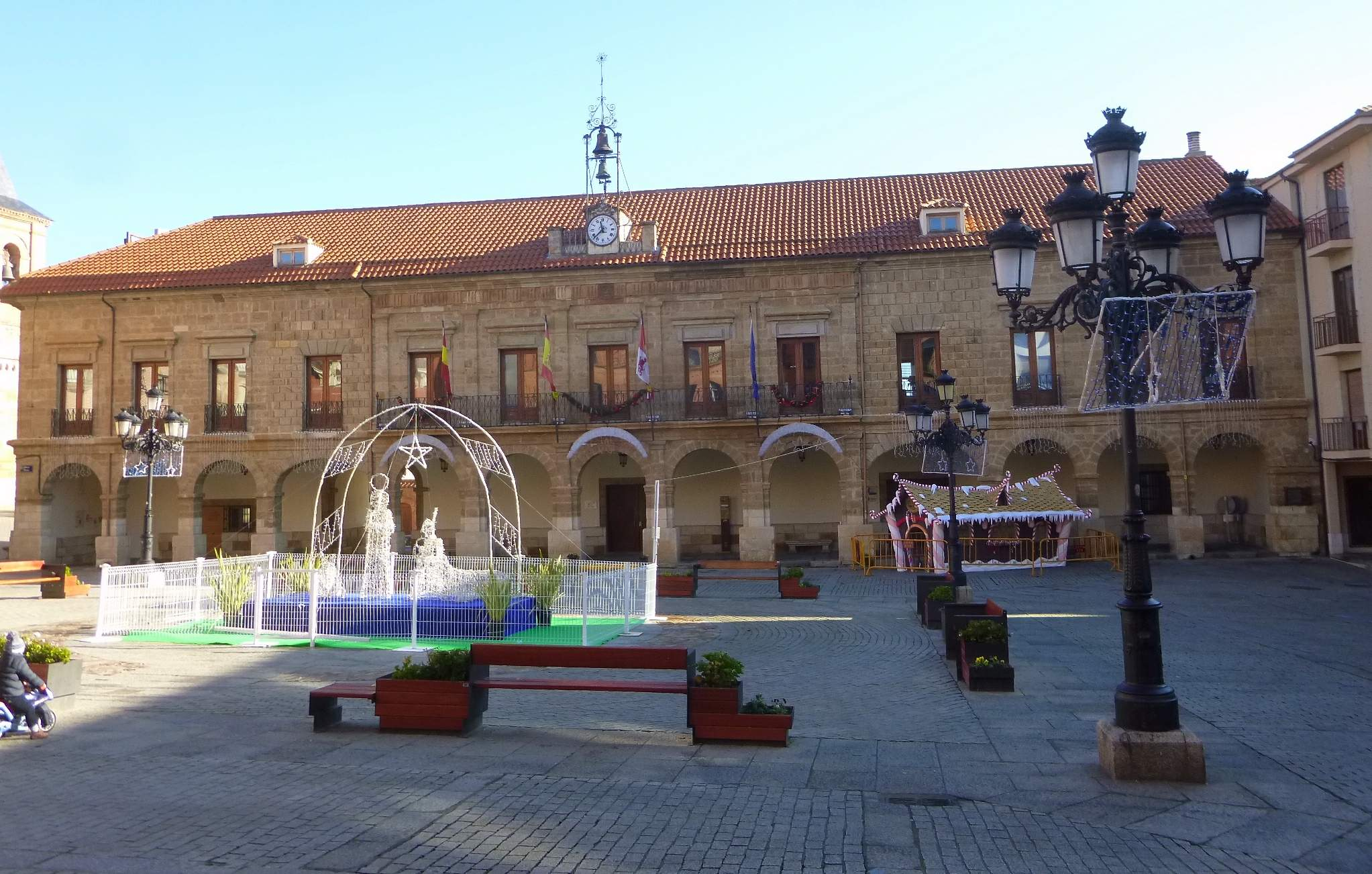

== Tourism ==
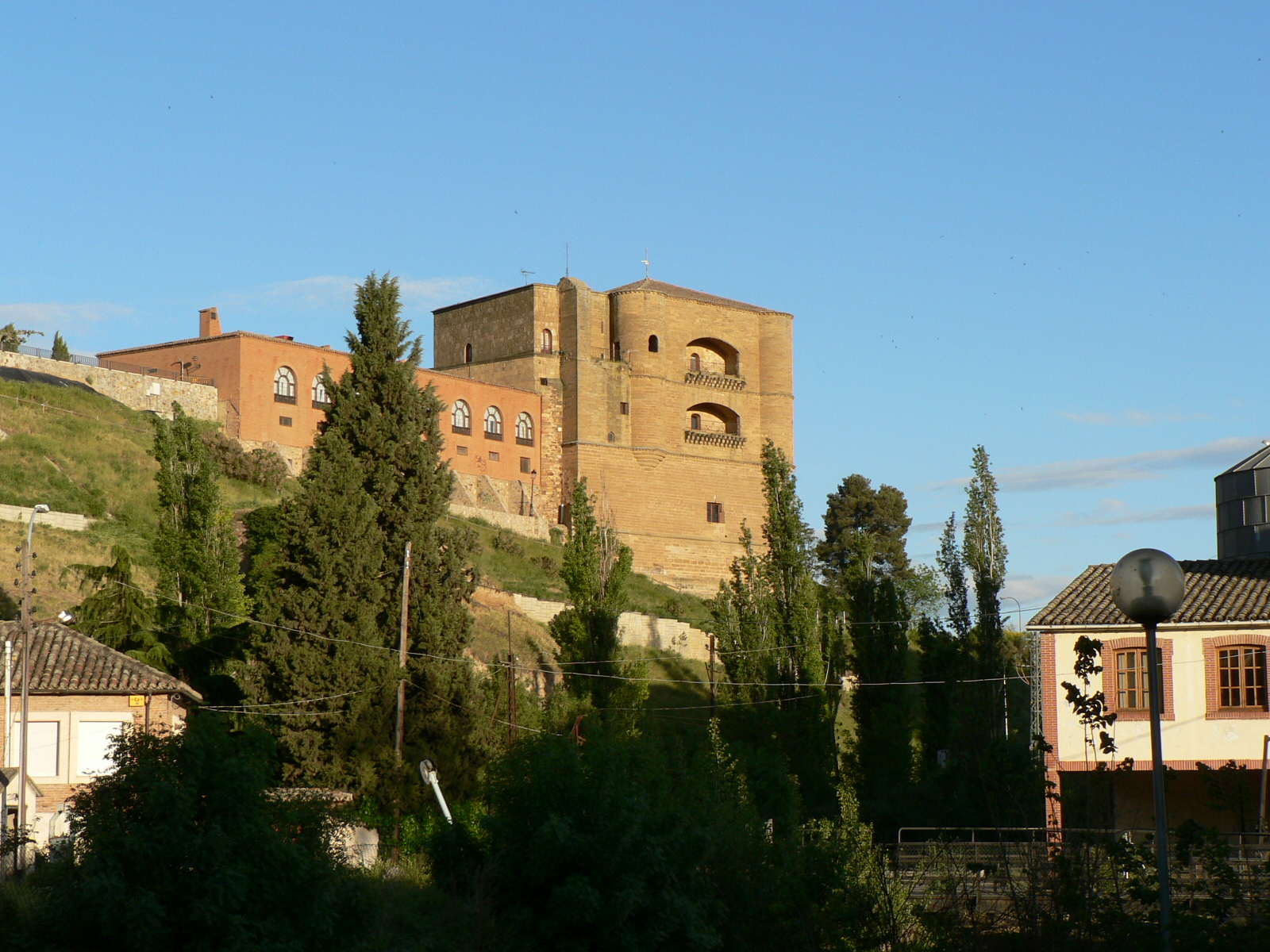
The Tower of the Caracol.

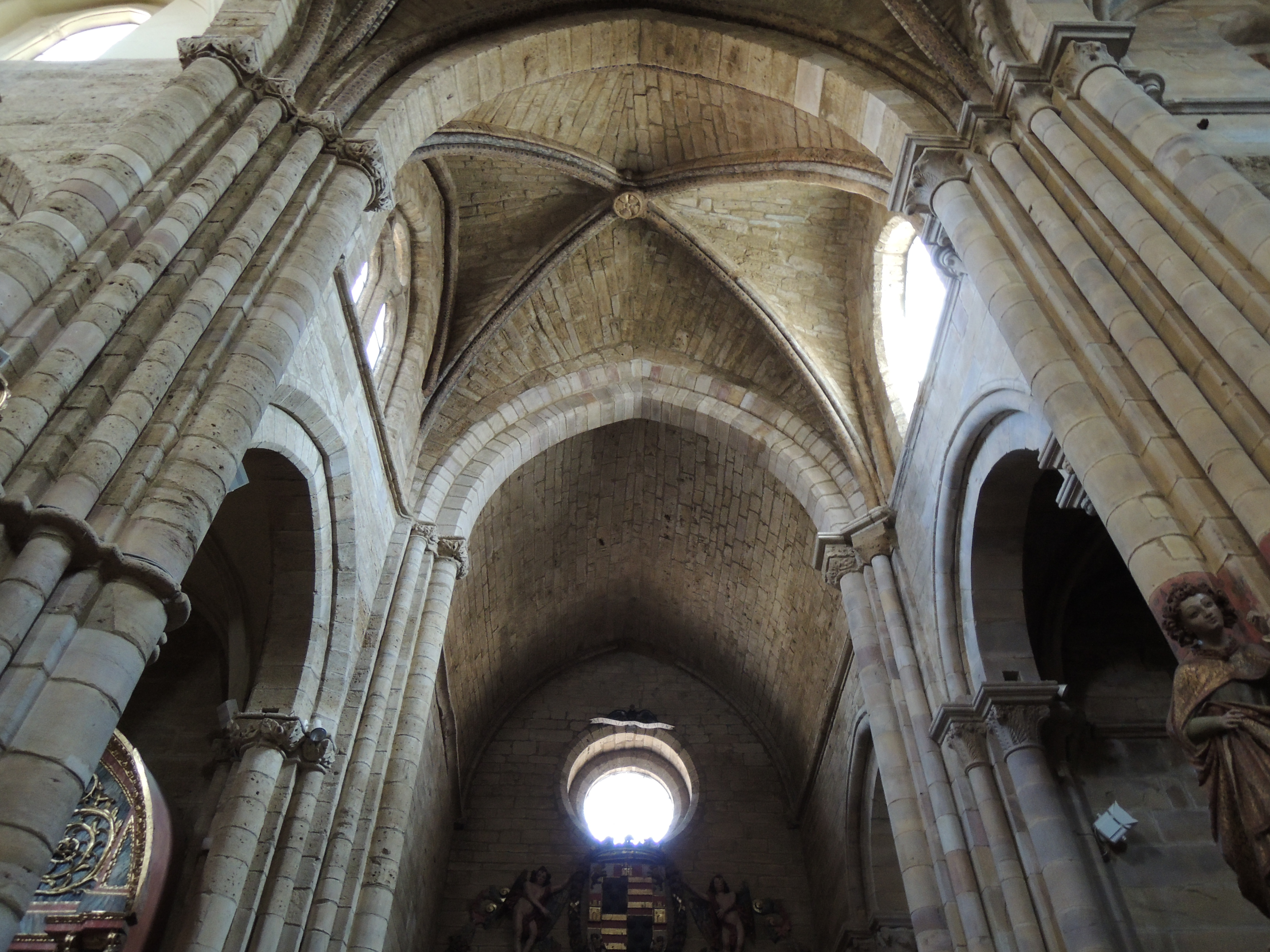
Church of Santa María de Azogue.

=== Parador ===
- Parador de Turismo Fernando II, which occupies the Caracol Tower, a 16th-century castle with wide segmental miradors and a Mudéjar coffered ceiling in the main section

=== Churches ===
- Church of Santa María de Azogue, in Romanesque style, begun in 1180. It has a Latin cross plan, with a nave and two aisles, separated by cruciform pilasters, with five apses. The nave has Gothic cross vaults added in the 16th century. The interior is home of several Gothic sculptures, such as that of the "Annunciation" (13th century)

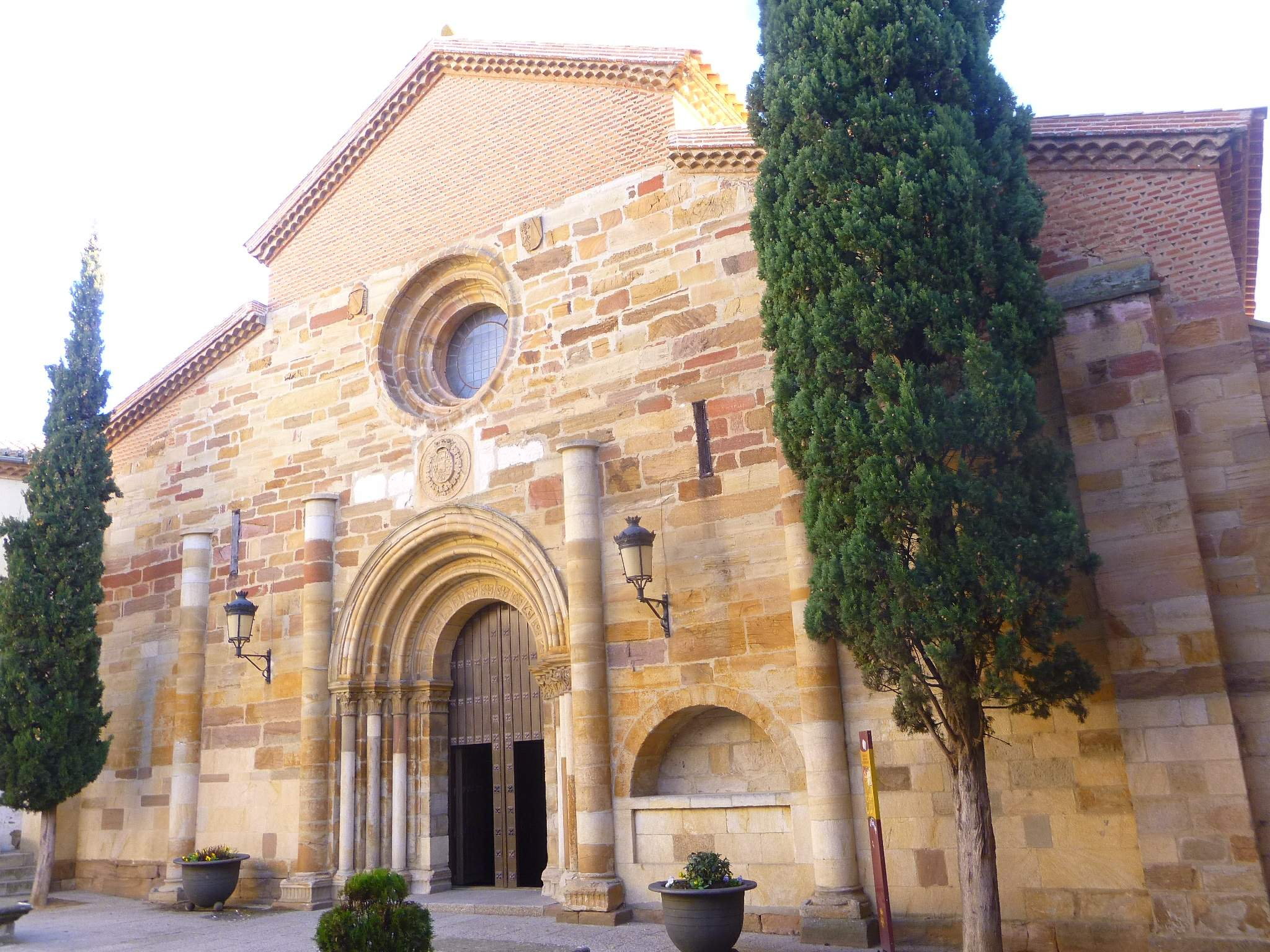
San Juan del Mercado church

- San Juan del Mercado Church, in Romanesque style (12th-13th centuries). It has three decorated portals with the Adoration of the Magi, the Virgin and Child and scenes of the birth of Jesus.

=== Hostel ===
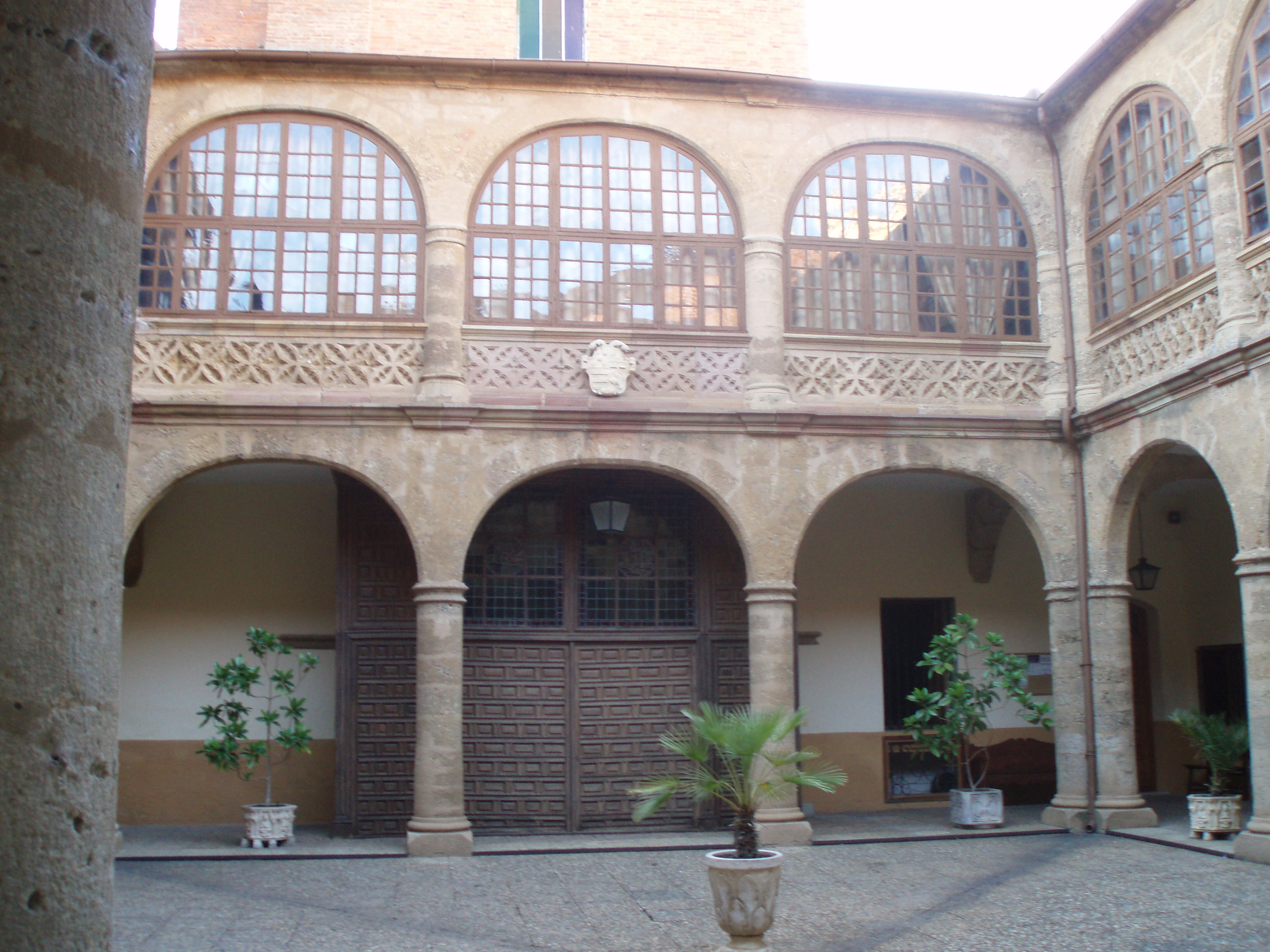
Hospital of La Piedad.

- Hospital of La Piedad, an old pilgrim hostel.

=== Other ===
- Hermitage of Soledad (early 16th century)
- Caracol Tower

=== Events ===
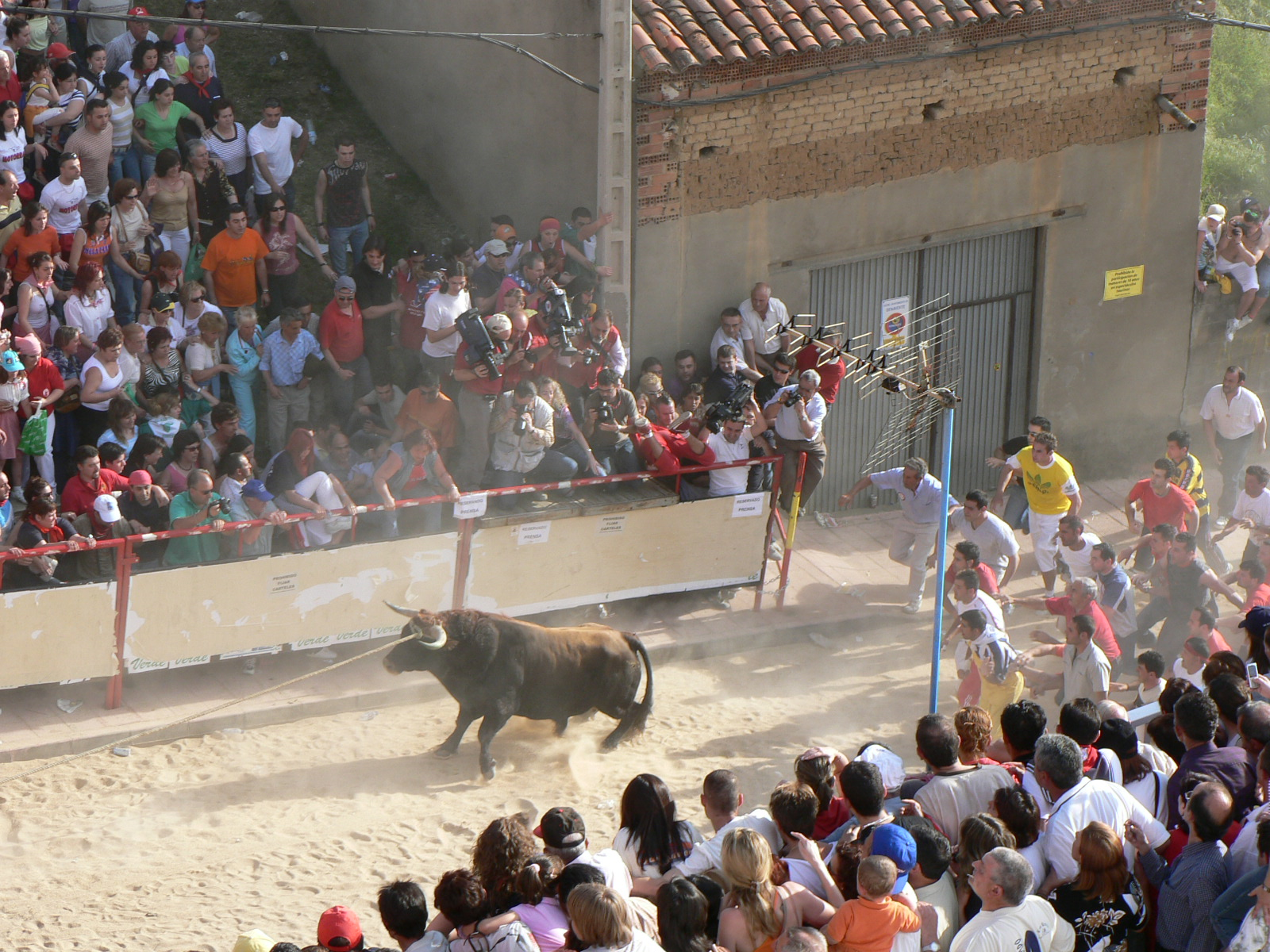
An enraged bull (2005).

- Fiestas de la Veguilla. The local celebration in honor of the Virgen de la Vega to celebrate the torno al llamado (Monday of Pascuilla).
- Fiestas del toro enmaromado. Celebrated the day before the corpus, where the young men run (Running of the Bulls) in front of a long rope held on the horns of a bull.

=== Accommodation ===
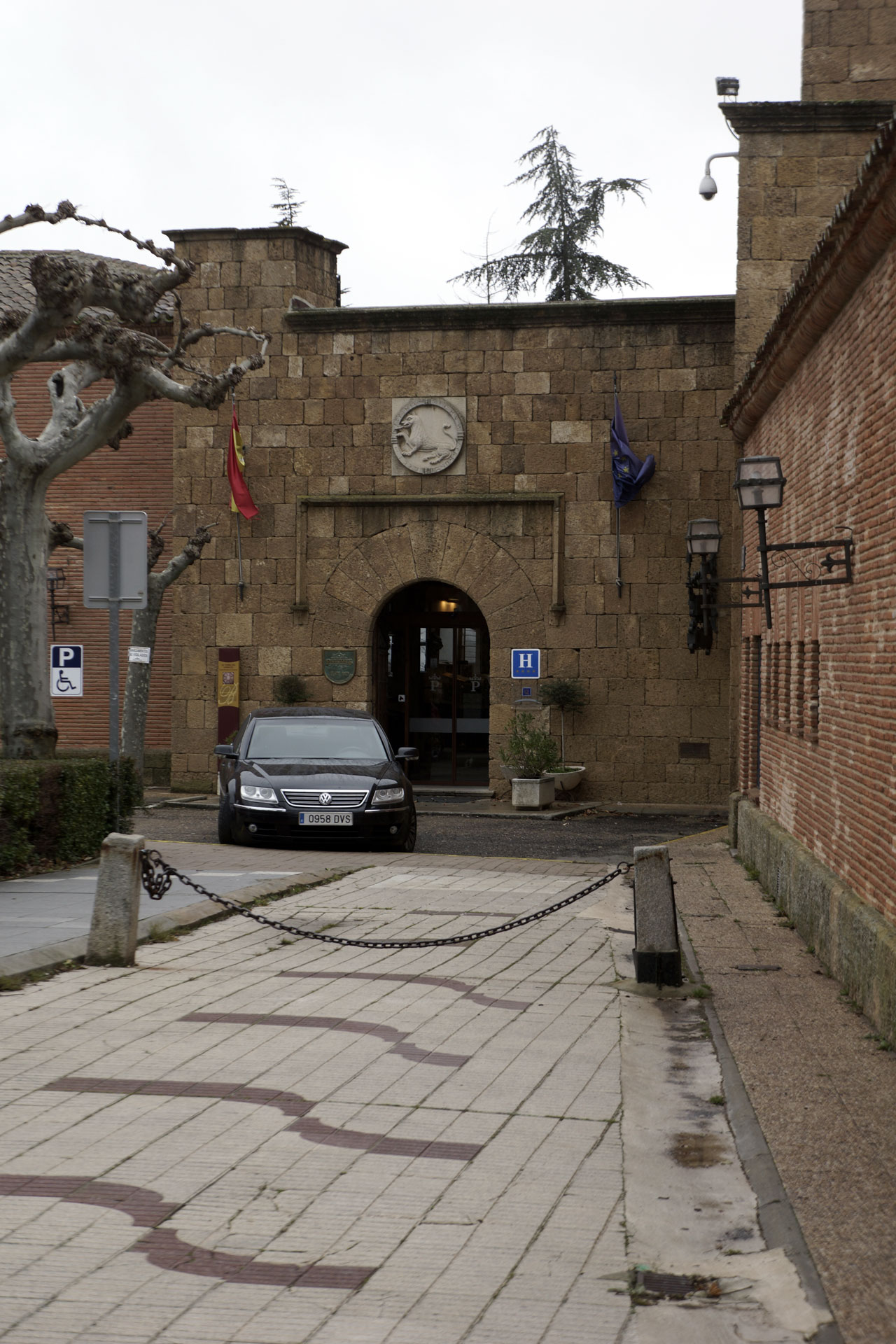
Parador de Turismo Rey Fernando II.

==== Hotels ====
- "Parador de Turismo Rey Fernando II de León" (H****) Paseos de la Mota, s/n
- "Villa de Benavente" (H ****) Avda. de las Américas, s/n
- "Santiago" (H ***) Avda. Maragatos, 34
- "Orense" (H **) C/ San Antón Viejo, 4
- "Arenas" (H *) Ctra. de Madrid, Km 261

==== Hostels ====
- "Hostal Avenida" (HS**) Avda. El Ferial, 17
- "Bristol" (HS**) C/ Santa Cruz, 44.
- "Universal" (HS**) C/ Sancti Spíritus, 17
- "Alameda" (HS**) Autovía Madrid - Coruña km. 262
- "Covadonga" (HS**) Avenida Federico Silva, 16
- "Paradero 3" (HS*) Autovía Madrid – Coruña Km 261
- "Paraíso" (HS *) C/ los Herreros, 64
- "La Trucha" (HS) C/ la Viña, 5
- "Jara" (HS) Autovía Madrid-Coruña km. 261
- "Pensión La Trapería" (P) C/Agujero de San Andrés, 10

== Climate ==
Benavente is characterized by a cold semi-arid climate in the Köppen climate classification (BSk) with continental influences due to the altitude of the municipality and its distance to the sea. The amount of winter frosts is increased, taking place even in spring, with consequential damage to some of the local agriculture.

Climate data for Benavente (1991-2020), extremes (1989-present)
Month	Jan	Feb	Mar	Apr	May	Jun	Jul	Aug	Sep	Oct	Nov	Dec	Year
Record high °C (°F)	18.2 (64.8)	21.9 (71.4)	26.1 (79.0)	29.4 (84.9)	34.5 (94.1)	38.2 (100.8)	40.6 (105.1)	41.1 (106.0)	36.0 (96.8)	31.9 (89.4)	22.4 (72.3)	17.8 (64.0)	41.1 (106.0)
Mean daily maximum °C (°F)	8.5 (47.3)	11.4 (52.5)	15.3 (59.5)	17.3 (63.1)	21.4 (70.5)	26.6 (79.9)	29.7 (85.5)	29.5 (85.1)	25.0 (77.0)	19.3 (66.7)	12.5 (54.5)	9.2 (48.6)	18.8 (65.9)
Daily mean °C (°F)	4.4 (39.9)	5.8 (42.4)	9.0 (48.2)	11.1 (52.0)	14.9 (58.8)	19.4 (66.9)	21.9 (71.4)	21.7 (71.1)	18.0 (64.4)	13.4 (56.1)	7.8 (46.0)	5.1 (41.2)	12.7 (54.9)
Mean daily minimum °C (°F)	0.3 (32.5)	0.1 (32.2)	2.6 (36.7)	4.9 (40.8)	8.4 (47.1)	12.1 (53.8)	14.0 (57.2)	13.9 (57.0)	11.1 (52.0)	7.5 (45.5)	3.1 (37.6)	0.9 (33.6)	6.6 (43.8)
Record low °C (°F)	−8.6 (16.5)	−9.5 (14.9)	−9.1 (15.6)	−2.9 (26.8)	−1.0 (30.2)	4.2 (39.6)	6.0 (42.8)	6.7 (44.1)	3.0 (37.4)	−1.2 (29.8)	−6.9 (19.6)	−11.2 (11.8)	−11.2 (11.8)
Average rainfall mm (inches)	36.5 (1.44)	20.6 (0.81)	25.3 (1.00)	36.5 (1.44)	38.7 (1.52)	28.2 (1.11)	17.3 (0.68)	9.8 (0.39)	21.7 (0.85)	51.3 (2.02)	39.3 (1.55)	46.9 (1.85)	372.1 (14.66)
Source: Agencia Estatal de Meteorologia

== Twin towns – sister cities ==
- Puebla, Puebla, Mexico.
- Vila Real, Portugal.

== Dukes of Benavente ==
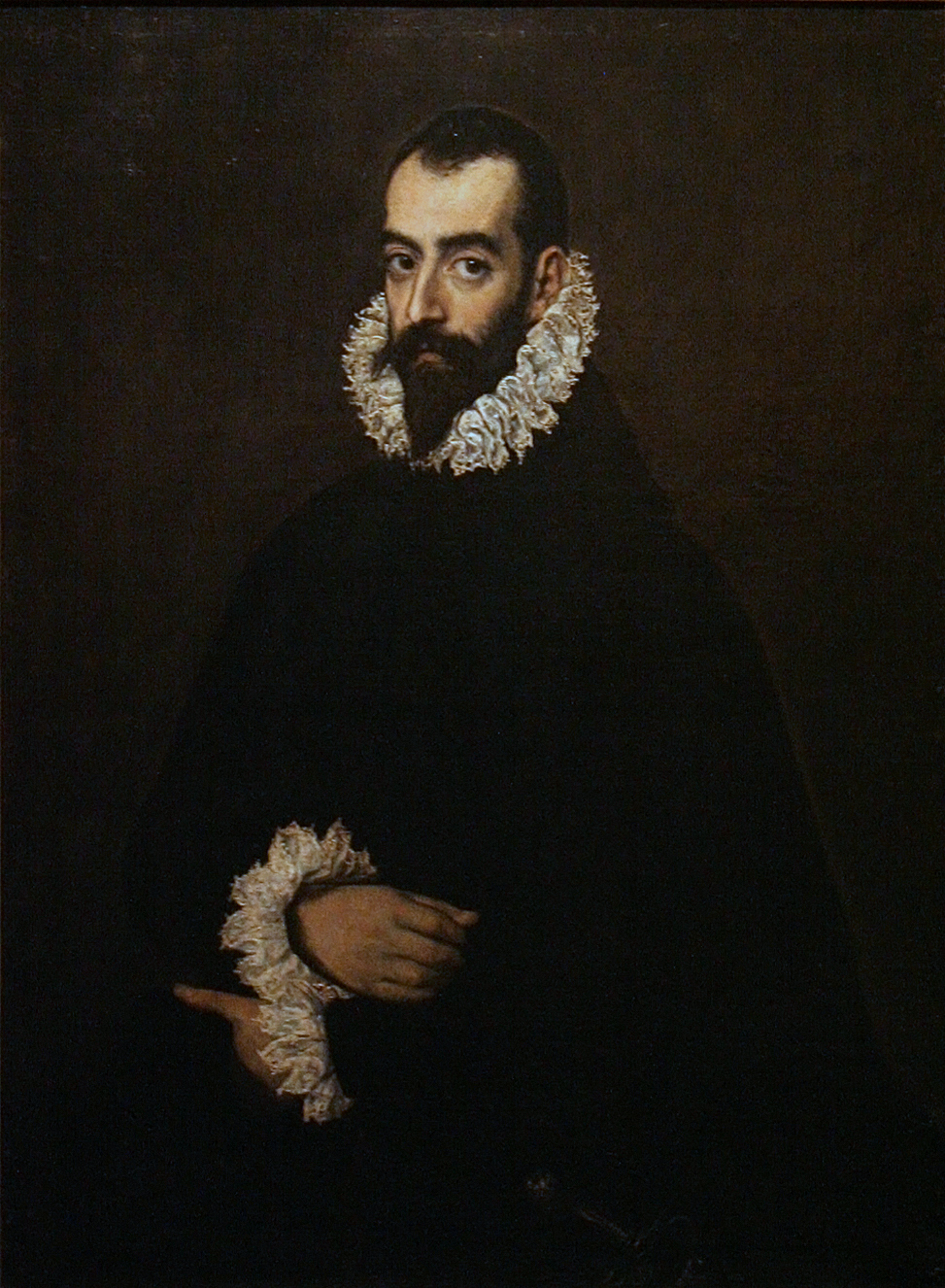
Portrait of Juan Alonso Pimentel de Herrera. Museum Bonnat, Bayonne, France

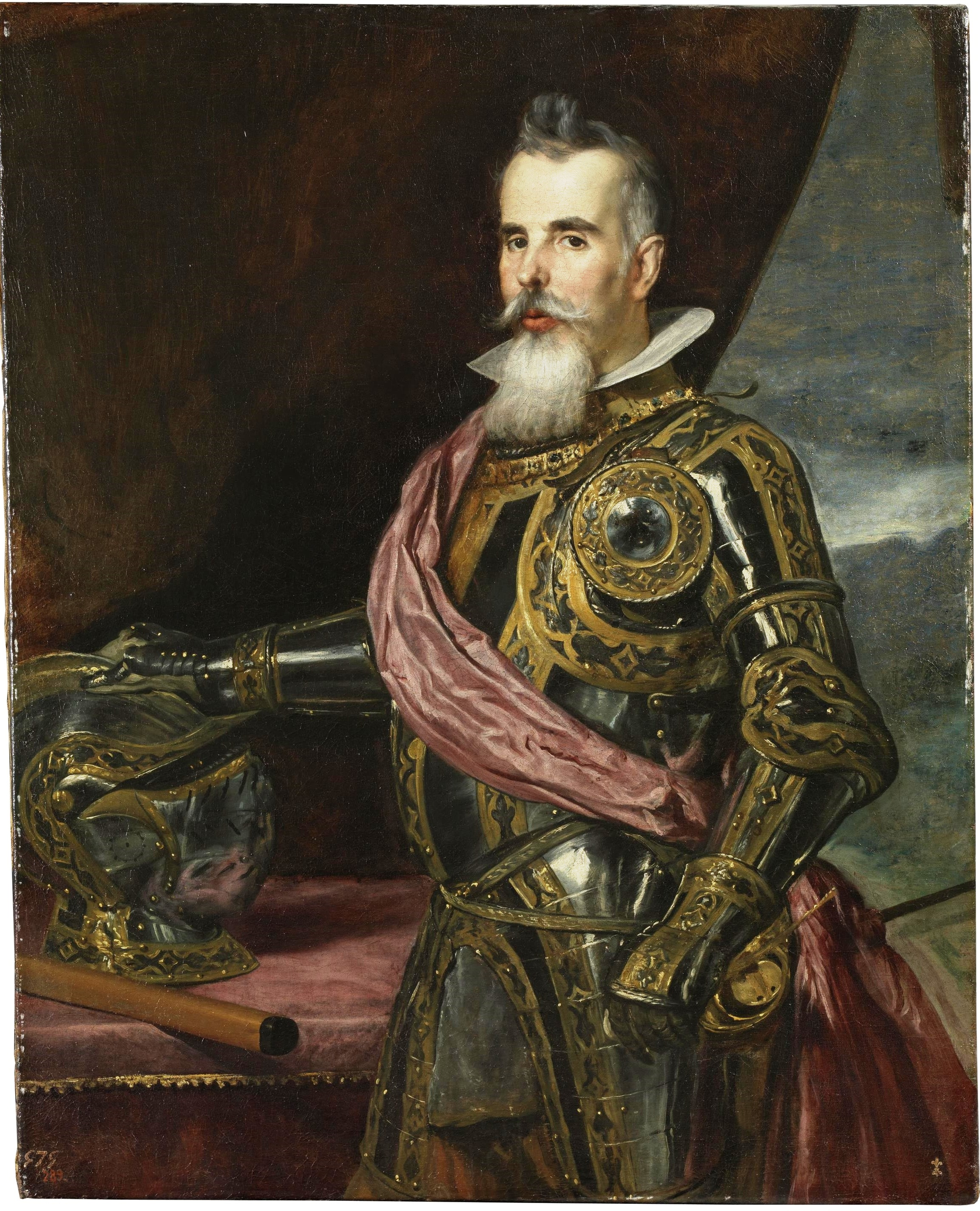
Juan Francisco Pimentel y Ponce de León, 7th Duke of Benavente, deceased 1652, by Diego Velázquez, 1648.

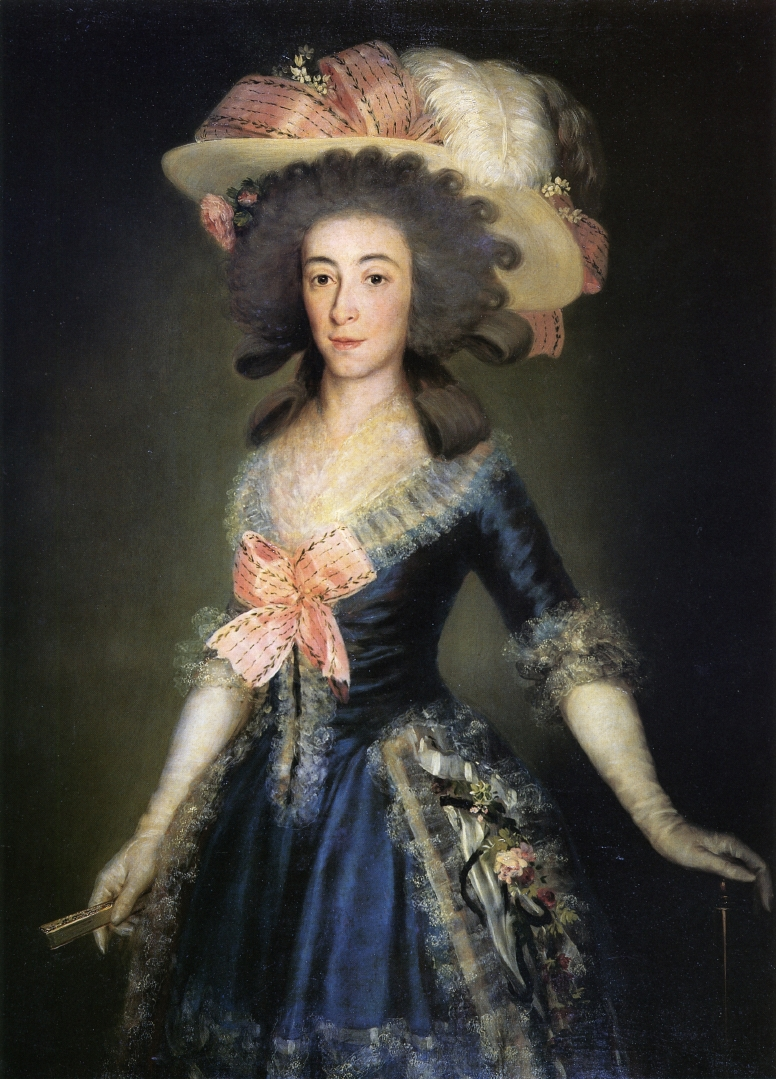
12th Countess of Benavente.

	Titular	Period
Primera creación por Enrique II
I	Fadrique de Castilla y Ponce de León	1370–1394
Segunda creación por Enrique IV
I	Rodrigo Alonso Pimentel	1473-
II	Alonso Pimentel y Pacheco	
III	Antonio Alonso Pimentel y Herrera de Velasco	
IV	Luis Alonso Pimentel Herrera y Enríquez de Velasco	
V	Juan Alonso Pimentel Herrera y Enríquez de Velasco	
VI	Antonio Alonso Pimentel y Quiñones	
VII	Juan Francisco Pimentel y Ponce de León	
VIII	Antonio Alonso Pimentel y Herrera Zúñiga	
IX	Francisco Casimiro Pimentel de Quiñones y Benavides	
X	Antonio Francisco Pimentel de Zúñiga y Vigil de Quiñones	
XI	Francisco Alonso Pimentel Vigil de Quiñones Borja Aragón y Centelles	
XII	María Josefa Pimentel, Duchess of Osuna	
XIII	Francisco de Borja Téllez-Girón y Alfonso Pimentel	
XIV	Pedro de Alcántara Téllez-Girón y Beaufort Spontin	
XV	Mariano Téllez-Girón y Beaufort Spontin	
XVI	Pedro de Alcántara Téllez-Girón y Fernández de Santillán	
XVII	Ángela María Téllez-Girón y Duque de Estrada	actual tituar

== Notable people ==
- José Carlos Guerra (artist)
- Maria Josefa Alfonso Pîmentel Tellez Girón Borja y Centelles, fourteenth Countess and twelfth Duchess of Benavente, a patron of Goya and Boccherini
- Fray Toribio de Benavente o Motolinía (1477–1569), a missionary to Mexico
- Alonso Briceño, one of the thirteen conquistadors led by Francisco Pizarro
- Luis de Carvajal the Younger, Crypto-Jewish writer and martyr
- Pita Pizarro (1792–1845), a minister of Isabella II of Spain
- Francisco de Castro Pascual (1871–1949), microbiologist
- José Nuñez Pernía (1805–1879), a Marquis of Nuñez and the first president of the Sociedad Hahnemanniana Matritense
- Pedro Nuñez Granés (1869–1944), engineer
- Celestino Alonso Rodríguez Valdespino (1828–1875), chess player
- Federico Silva Muñoz (1923–1997), politician
- Laura Iglesias Romero, a scientist who does research for the CSIC
- Francisco José Ynduráin (1940–2008), scientist
- Almudena Fernández (born 1977), model

== Language ==
Regional speech is influenced by the Leonese language.

== Cinemas and theatres ==
- "Reina Sofía" Theatre.
- "Multicines Benavente" Cinema.

== See also ==
- List of municipalities in Zamora
- San Pedro De Zamudia, Zamora
- Sandin, Zamora
- Almudena Fernandez - Famous model from Benavente.
