= Francisco José =

Francisco José may refer to:

- Francisco José Arnáiz Zarandona
- Francisco José Borja Cevallos
- Francisco José Caeiro
- Francisco José Camarasa
- Francisco José Carrasco
- Francisco José Cox
- Francisco José Cróquer
- Francisco José Debali
- Francisco José Fernandes Costa
- Francisco José Fernández Mas
- Francisco José Freire
- Francisco José Furtado
- Francisco José Garanito Sousa
- Francisco José Jattin Safar
- Francisco José Lara
- Francisco José Lloreda Mera
- Francisco José Lombardi
- Francisco José López Fernández
- Francisco José Madero González
- Francisco José Maldonado
- Francisco José Martínez
- Francisco José Millán Mon
- Francisco José Monagas
- Francisco José Múgica
- Francisco José Nicolás González
- Francisco José Pacheco
- Francisco José Pinheiro
- Francisco José Pérez
- Francisco José Ribas
- Francisco José Rodríguez Gaitán
- Francisco José Sánchez Rodríguez
- Francisco José Tenreiro
- Francisco José Urrutia Holguín
- Francisco José Urrutia Olano
- Francisco José Ynduráin
- Francisco José de Almeida Lopes
- Francisco José de Caldas
- Francisco José de Ovando, 1st Marquis of Brindisi
