= Petare =

Dulce Nombre de Jesús de Petare
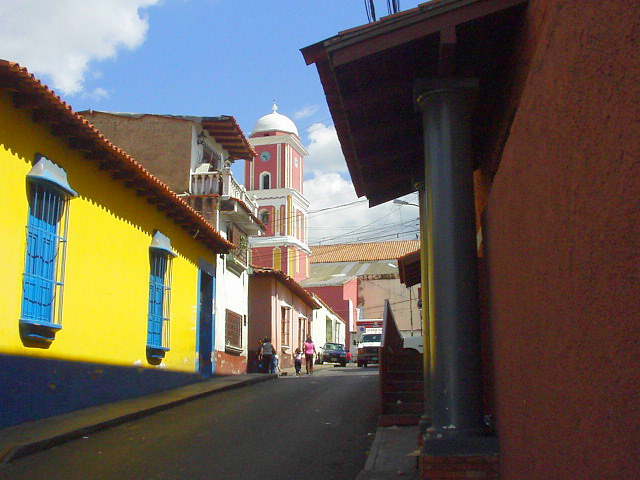
- Historic center of Petare

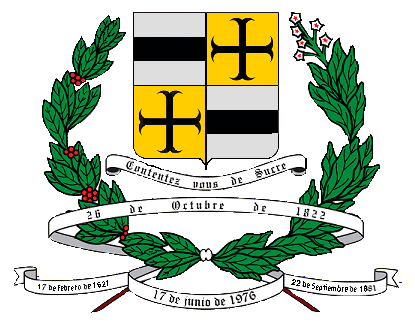
- Flag Coat of arms

- Location within Venezuela
- Coordinates: 10°29′N 66°49′W
- Country: Venezuela
- State: Miranda
- Founded: February 17, 1621

Government
  - Mayor: Diógenes Lara
  - Political party: PSUV

Area
  - Total: 40 km^{2} (15 sq mi)
- Elevation: 900 m (3,000 ft)

Population (2025)
  - Total: 465,713
  - Density: 12,000/km^{2} (30,000/sq mi)
- Demonym: Petareño(a)
- Time zone: UTC−4 (VET)
- Postal code: 1073
- Website: alcaldiamunicipiosucre.gov.ve

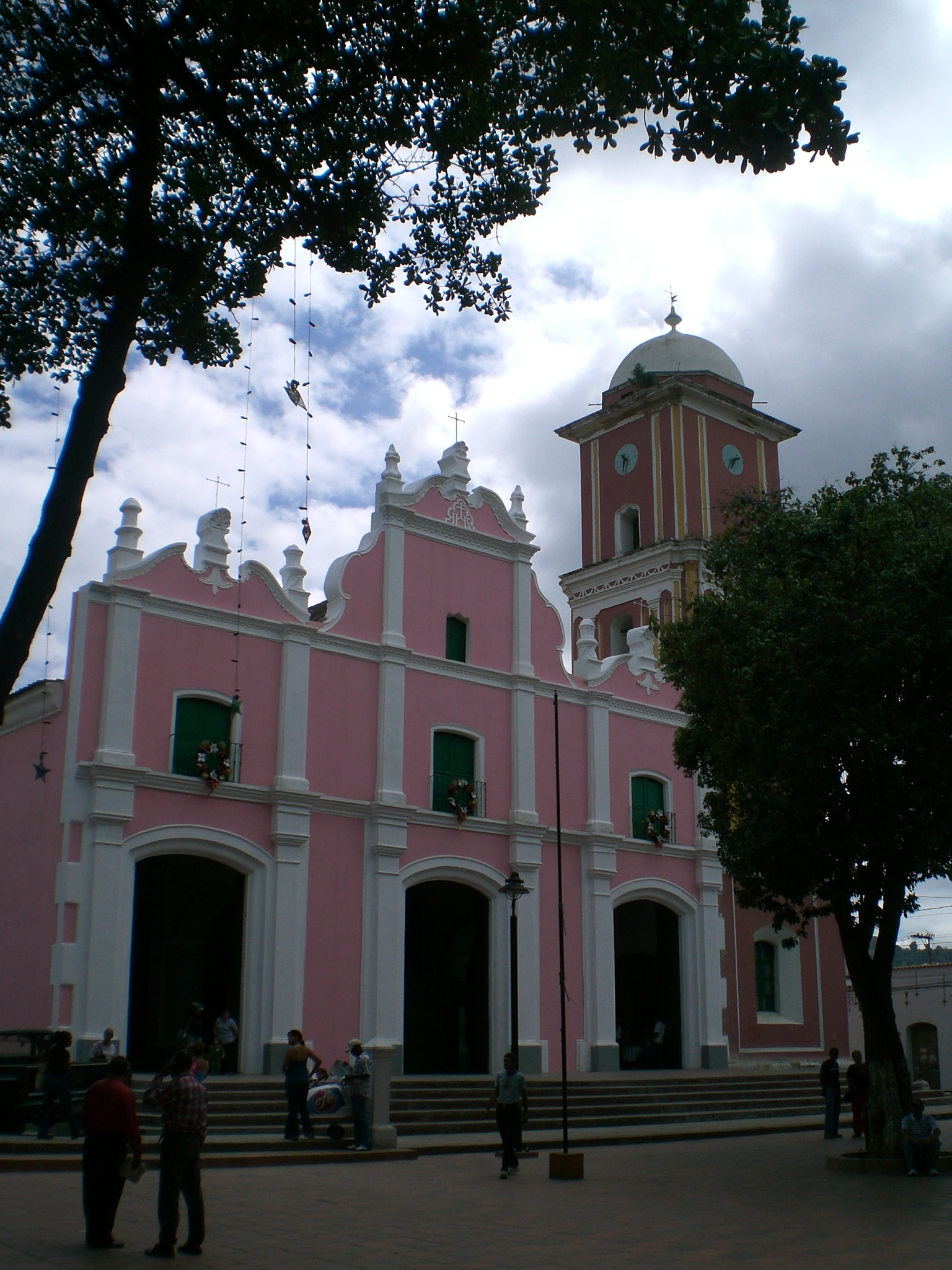
Dulce Nombre de Jesús de Petare Church

Dulce Nombre de Jesús de Petare is a neighborhood in Miranda, Venezuela, and is part of the Metropolitan District of Caracas. It is located in the Sucre Municipality, one of the five divisions of Caracas. The city was founded in 1621 under the name of San Jose de Guanarito. It grew to become a part of the Greater Caracas area as the latter expanded in area and population. Petare had a population of 372,106 inhabitants and about 448,861 according to 2020 estimates. Petare is the biggest slum in Venezuela, and in South America.

The neighborhood is towards the eastern edge of Caracas, but has developed its own commercial core. Two universities are located in Petare: Universidad Santa María and Universidad Metropolitana. Poverty remains a major limitation to the city's development.

== History ==
=== Colonial period ===
On February 17, 1621, Captain Pedro Gutiérrez de Lugo and Father Gabriel de Mendoza founded the town of Dulce Nombre de Jesús de Petare, on a small hill bordered by the El Oro ravine and the Caurimare and Guaire rivers.

The Mariches, an indigenous group belonging to the Caribbean linguistic family, inhabited these lands until 1573, when their main cacique, Cacique Tamanaco, died at the hands of the Spanish conqueror Pedro Alonso Galeas. From then on, the subjugation of the aborigines began and the distribution of the first encomiendas by Diego de Losada, Juan Gallegos, Sebastián Díaz Alfaro and Francisco Fajardo.

According to the usage of the time, the settlers, mostly Canary Islanders, built the town following the grid shape of the central square, around which they located the church, the first public buildings, the market and the homes of the most notable families.

In the fertile Mariche valley, Coffee, Cocoa bean, Maize (or Corn) and Sugarcane farms proliferated; the latter was processed in the nearby mills to extract the sweet paper and the bitter liquor. These crops supplied food not only to the residents of Dulce Nombre de Jesús, but also to their neighbors in Caracas. Among the most important were La Bolea, Los Marrones, La Urbina, Los Ruices, El Marqués, Macaracuay and Güere-Güere (today La California Norte urbanization).

The fertility of the soil and the pleasant climate attracted prominent personalities from Caracas. Andrés Bello, José Félix Ribas, José Antonio Rodríguez Domínguez, Manuel de Clemente and Francisco de Berroterán (Marquis of Valle de Santiago) were part of the select group of guests who acquired properties for cultivation and rest.

The Caminos Reales also contributed to the development of the local economy. This important network of roads formed a crossroads in Petare, making the small town an obligatory stop for travelers and merchants traveling from Caracas, Baruta and El Hatillo to Guarenas and Mariches. Just where these routes converged, a dynamic exchange of agricultural products and merchandise in general took place. The site later took the name of Los Portales. Among the Royal Roads, the one that linked Caracas with Petare stood out and that from the Santa Rosa ravine passed to Sabana Grande (by the Calle Real de Sabana Grande or Chacao), Los Dos Caminos, Boleita and Petare itself, that is, the which is known as the colonial center of the city. Almost without modifications, this Camino Real de Petare became, towards the middle of the 20th century, Francisco de Miranda Avenue, which explains its layout, with quite smooth curves, but without having rectilinear sections (it is the same thing that happens in New York with Broadway Avenue, which is the only street that is not straight in the city because it is the old colonial road that linked the North with the South of the island of Manhattan).

The social structure was made up of four segments: the slaves (blacks), the common people (peasants, carters, artisans, and indigenous people), the merchants (grocers and pulperos), and the ranchers. This order remained practically unchanged for centuries. It was a wealthy society, not aristocratic, but with sufficient economic resources to acquire valuable objects and undertake ambitious works, such as the Church of the Sweet Name of Jesus and the Chapel of Saint Mary Magdalene.

=== Contemporary Period (20th and 21st Centuries) ===
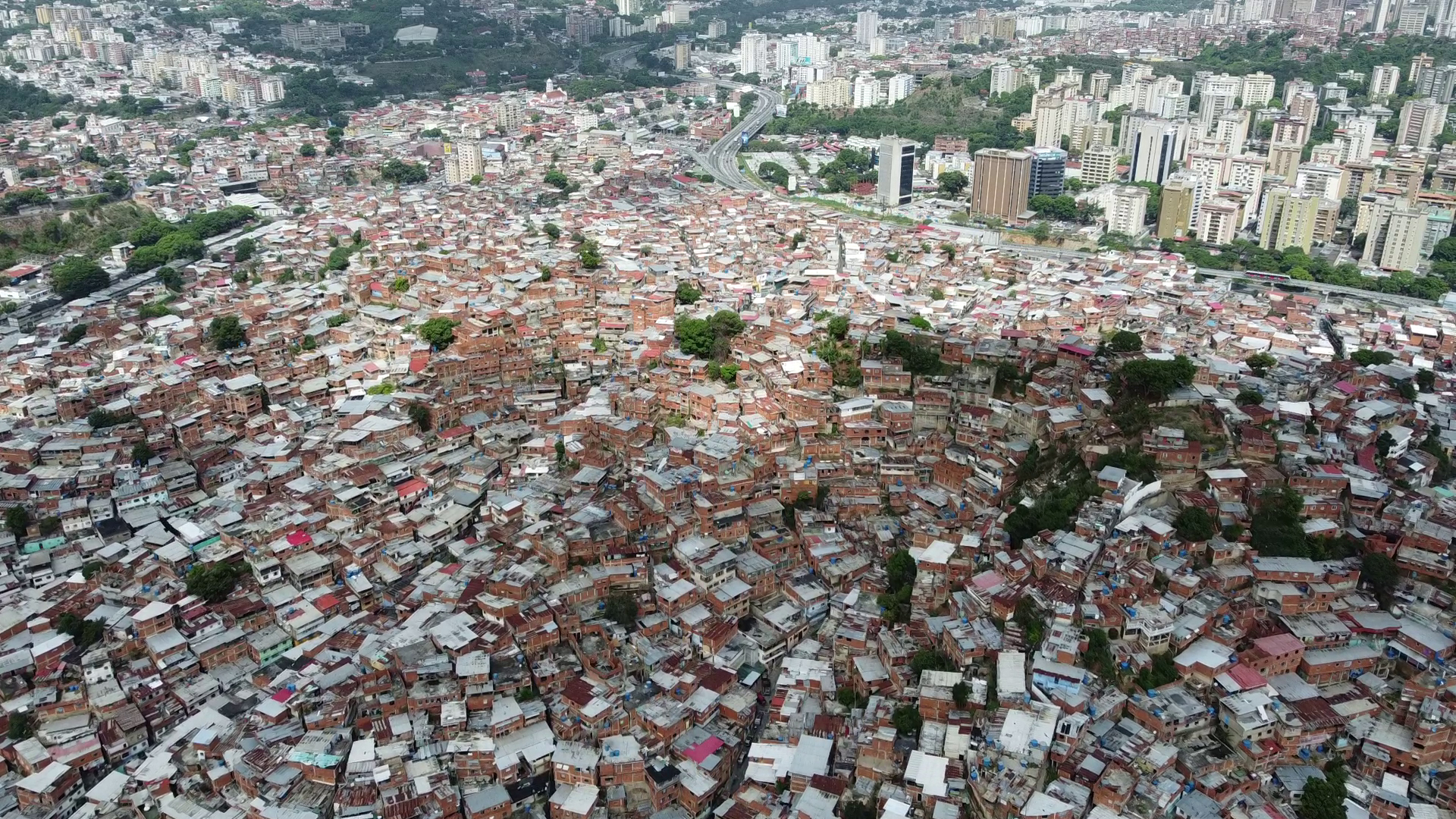
Favela in Petare (2023)

The 20th century began with a new political order for Petare. In 1904, the capital of the Miranda state was transferred to Ocumare del Tuy, for which Petare became the head of the Sucre Department of the Eastern Section of the Federal District, until seven years later it received the appointment of capital of the Sucre District of the state. Miranda.

Until the 1950s, approximately, the people of Caracas frequented the town and its surroundings, seduced by the beautiful landscape of cultivated fields and clear rivers, the bucolic image of the colonial-style houses and the mild temperatures between 23 and 25 degrees Celsius. . Among the illustrious visitors were the writer Teresa de La Parra, who spent some time at the Hacienda Güere-Güere; and Tito Salas, a painter who chose the El Toboso mansion as his residence next to the Baloa bridge on the Tuy railway, where he organized meetings for his friends, Andrés Eloy Blanco and Isaías Medina Angarita.

The democratic era brought more profound transformations: public services, such as transportation, education, health, electricity and water, were expanded and improved for the benefit of the community. However, a violent process of human growth also began, propitiated by the replacement of extensive plantations by modern urbanizations, industrial zones and popular neighborhoods.

Concerned about the avalanche of progress, the authorities decided to protect the old town of Petare, which preserved its buildings, homes and public spaces almost intact. In this sense, on August 2, 1960, the Venezuelan State declared the Dulce Nombre de Jesús Church and the Santa María Magdalena Chapel National Historical Monuments.

Likewise, the Municipal Chamber of the Sucre District created, through the resolution of October 29, 1964, the Historic Center of Petare, in order to preserve this urban area, rich in testimonies of the cultural identity of Venezuela. Its limits return to the original space occupied by the old town and its buildings were subject to special construction regulations.

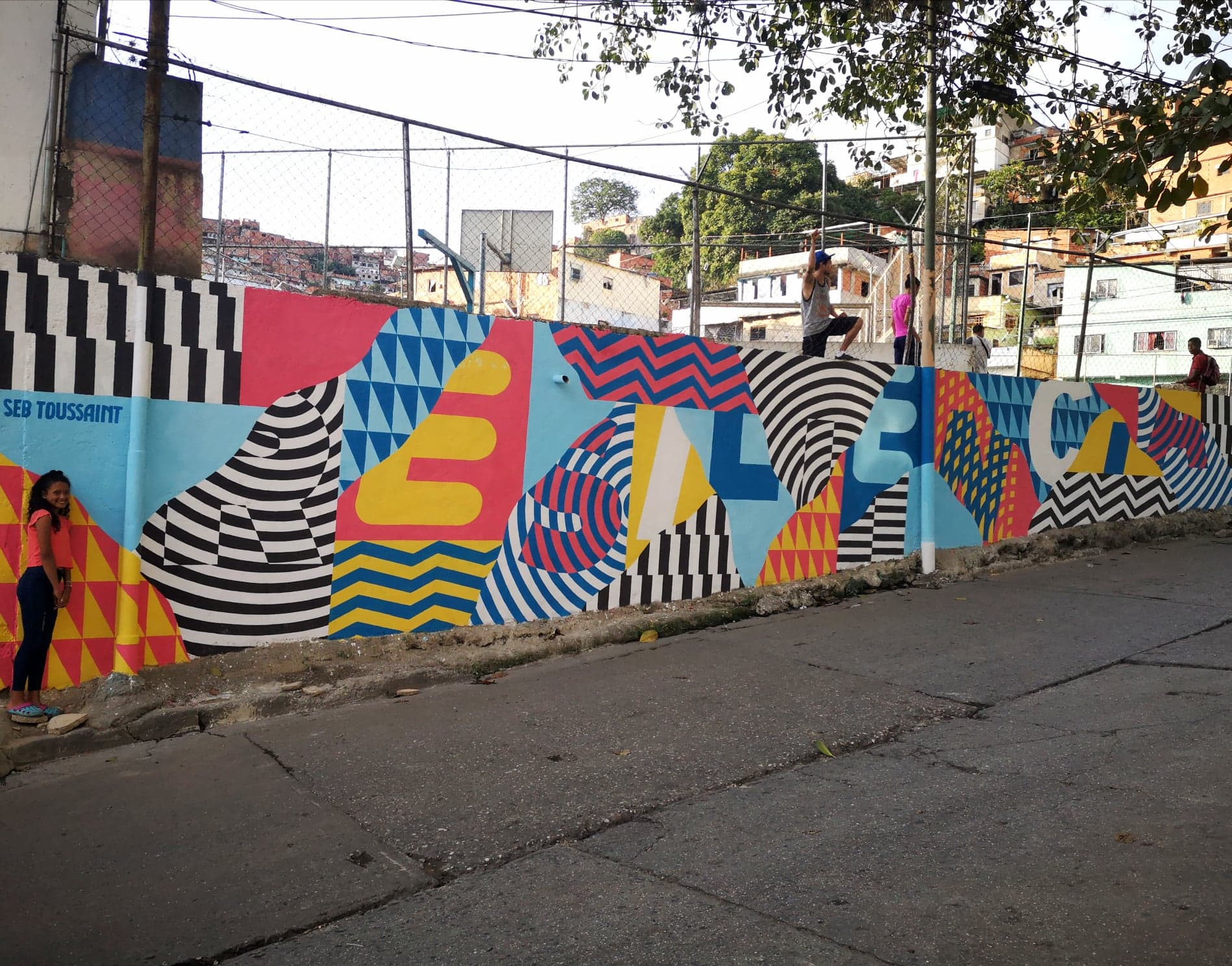
Mural by artist Seb Toussaint in Petare (2019)

Despite these measures, the sector has suffered the demolition and modification of its old buildings, due to the indiscriminate establishment of commercial premises and transport stops to serve the enormous population of the neighboring urbanizations and neighborhoods. The constant transit of this immense number of people has resulted in the collapse of public services and the proliferation of previously unknown social ills. In 1990, Petare became the capital of the Sucre Municipality and the census of that same year counted 500,800 inhabitants.

Once again in pursuit of its salvation, on August 31, 1993, the Council of the Sucre Municipality issued the Ordinance for the Conservation and Development of the Historic Center of Petare, a document that regulates the use of the buildings and dictates the creation of a board special for the safeguarding and revitalization of the area.

Finally, on October 7, 2000, the Legislative Council of the state of Miranda declared the colonial center a Historical, Cultural and Tourist Center, a resolution that establishes the creation of a commission made up of public and private representatives, whose mission is to prepare a recovery for the sector, also including the house of Tito Salas and the Trapiche Arvelo. The results of this latest resolution remain to be seen.

== Notable people ==
- Francisco José Monagas (1747–1814), rancher and businessman

== See also ==
- List of cities and towns in Venezuela
