= Francisco José Monagas =

Francisco José Monagas (1747–1814) was a Venezuelan rancher and businessman. He was born in Tócome, Petare in the state of Miranda in 1747 and died in Maturin in the state of Monagas in December 1814. His parents were Bartolomé Monagas de León, a native of the Canary Islands ensign, and María Ignacia Fernández de León, Bartolomé's cousin. He married Perfecta Burgos Villasana, a native of San Carlos, with whom he had several children including María Celestina, José Tadeo Monagas, José Gregorio Monagas, María de los Reyes, Antonio Gerardo, Francisco José and Petronila Antonia.

== Career and death ==
From a young age Francisco José Monagas had moved to the plains near Maturin where he began to occupy land and create herds of cattle. From 1810 he and his sons supported the independence process in Venezuela. He was killed in Maturin in December 1814 when the troops of Spanish General Francisco Tomás Morales occupied the area. Eduardo Blanco recounted in the chapter Maturin (1814) of his novel Heroic Venezuela that Francisco José had refused to escape Maturin on a horse offered by his son José Tadeo, but rather told his son to save himself as he was more useful to the independence cause.

Petronila Antonia and María Rosaura were killed the same day that their father was murdered while María Celestina was struck with a machete, but was saved from slaughter. His son, Francisco José Monagas Burgos played a leading role in the war of independence of Venezuela and attained the rank of colonel. He died in San Joaquin de Anzoátegui in 1860.
