= Francisco José Ynduráin =

Spanish physicist (1940–2008)

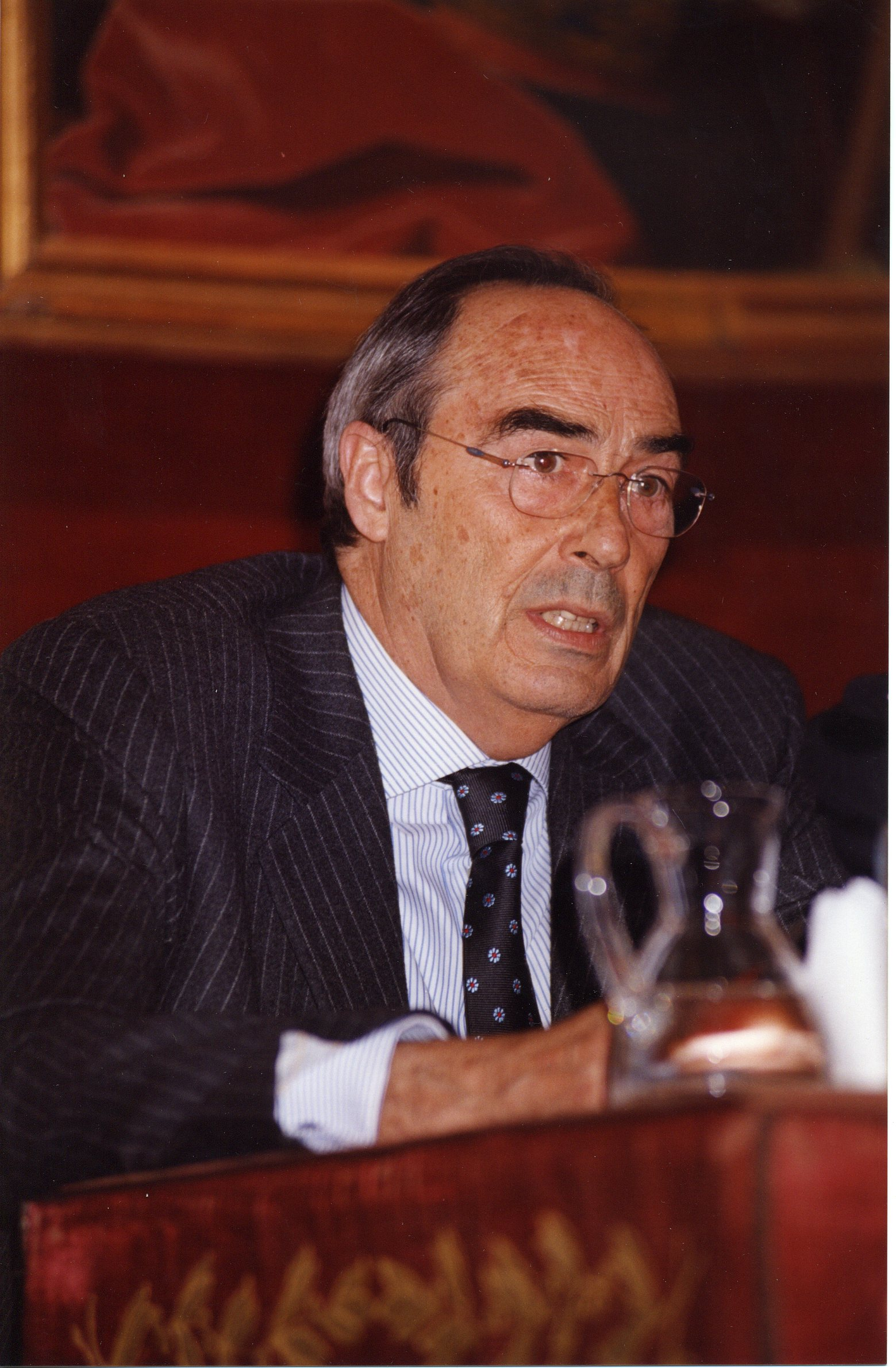
- Ynduráin en 2005
- Born: 23 December 1940; Benavente, Zamora, Spain
- Died: 6 June 2008 (aged 67); Madrid, Spain
- Education: University of Zaragoza
- Scientific career
- Fields: Physics
- Workplaces: Universidad Autónoma de Madrid

Francisco José Ynduráin Muñoz (23 December 1940 – 6 June 2008) was a Spanish theoretical physicist. He founded the particle physics research group that became the Department of Theoretical Physics at the Autonomous University of Madrid, where he was a professor. He was described by his colleagues as "a scientist that always searched for excellence in research".

== Early life ==
Yndurain was born in Benavente in the Province of Zamora and grew up in Zaragoza. After graduating from Zaragoza's San Agustin High school, he received his M.S. degree in mathematics in 1962 and in 1964 his PhD in physics. He obtained both degrees from the University of Zaragoza (Spain).

While completing his doctoral studies, he was a visiting scientist at CERN and a Teaching Assistant at the University of Zaragoza (Spain).

== Career ==
Ynduráin was an associate professor at the University of Zaragoza until 1966. He was a researcher at New York University from 1966 to 1968, at which point he moved to Geneva to become a research fellow at CERN until 1970. He was a researcher at CERN from then on, as a senior scientific associate (1976–1992), and as a member of the scientific policy committee (1988–1994).

In 1970, he took the professor position in Madrid (at the Complutense University and immediately after at the Autonomous University of Madrid) where he founded and headed the Particle Physics Research group. He was director of the Department of Theoretical Physics (1974–1977 and 1981–1984), dean of the Faculty of Science (1975) and deputy president (1978–1981) of the Autonomous University of Madrid.

He also held other short-term appointments at other universities worldwide:

- Central University of Venezuela in Caracas, Venezuela (1967).
- Paris-Sud 11 University, Paris, France (1969 and 1970).
- University of Groningen, Netherlands (1973).
- Université de Marseille, Marseille, France (1979, 1980, 1981 and 1982)
- University of Michigan, Ann Arbor, Michigan, USA (1987, 1988, 1991, 1993, 1994, 1995, 1997 and 2001).
- National University of La Plata, Argentina (1994).
- Princeton University, New Jersey, USA (2008).

He collaborated with other research centers:

- Brookhaven National Laboratory (1984).
- National Institute for Nuclear Physics and High Energy Physics NIKHEF, 1997 and 2001).
- Kuwait Institute for Scientific Research (1980 and 1982).
- Centro latinoamericano de Física in Bogotá, Colombia (1985, 1986 and 1987).

He was a member of the Royal Spanish Physical Society, Royal Academy of Exact Physical and Natural Sciences of Spain, where he was president of the Physics and Chemistry section from 2002 to 2006. He was also member of the American Physical Society, founding member of the European Physical Society and member of the European Academy of Sciences energy committee. In 2004 he was nominated general secretary of the Instituto de España.

== Works ==
In 1983, Yndurain published a widely used book advanced textbook on quantum field theory for graduate students, Quantum Chromodynamics: An Introduction to the Theory of Quarks and Gluons. The book has been translated into Russian as Kvantovaia Khromodinamika. The book was expanded twice: once in 1990 in Spanish as Mecánica Cuántica Relativista and translated into English in 1996 as Relativistic Quantum Mechanics and Introduction to Field Theory (with a later revised translation), and again in 1999 as The Theory of Quark and Gluon Interactions (with several later editions).

Yndurain also wrote books on science for a broader audience. In 1997, he published a book discussing UFOs theories, Quién anda ahí?, which won the Golondriz award for smart humor in 1998. In 2002, he published a book about the structure of matter entitled Electrones, neutrinos y quarks. Finally, in 2004 he published a book about science, scientists and history entitled Los desafíos de la ciencia.

== Awards ==
- 1986: Nominated Cavaliere Ufficiale nell'Ordine al Merito, one of the main Italian orders of merit.
- 1990: Annual Award of the Royal Spanish Academy of Sciences.
- 1992: Elected Member of the Spanish Royal Academy of Exact, Physical and Natural Sciences.
- 1994: Nominated Distinguished Guest by the University of La Plata
- 1995: Elected member of European Academy of Sciences and Arts
- 2001: Nominated member of The World Innovation Foundation.
- 2003: Gold medal for scientific excellence of the Spanish Academy of Physics.

== Selected articles ==
Yndurain was an expert in quantum field theory and its application to elementary particles. He authored or co-authored more than 100 scientific papers on high energy physics, nuclear physics and mathematical physics.

- González-Arroyo, A.; López, C.; Ynduráin, F.J. (1979). "Second-order contributions to the structure functions in deep inelastic scattering (I). Theoretical calculations". Nuclear Physics B. 153. Elsevier BV: 161–186. doi:10.1016/0550-3213(79)90596-0. ISSN 0550-3213.
- Becchi, C.; Narison, S.; Rafael, E.; Yndurain, F. J. (1981). "Light quark masses in quantum chromodynamics and chiral symmetry breaking". Zeitschrift für Physik C. 8 (4). Springer Science and Business Media LLC: 335–348. doi:10.1007/bf01546328. ISSN 0170-9739. S2CID 121920818.
- de Trocóniz, J. F.; Ynduráin, F. J. (22 April 2005). "Hadronic contributions to the anomalous magnetic moment of the muon". Physical Review D. 71 (7) 073008. arXiv:hep-ph/0402285. doi:10.1103/physrevd.71.073008. ISSN 1550-7998. S2CID 16779732.
- Titard, S.; Ynduráin, F. J. (1 June 1994). "Rigorous QCD evaluation of spectrum and ground state properties of heavy qq¯ systems, with a precision determination of m_{b},M(η_{b})". Physical Review D. 49 (11). American Physical Society (APS): 6007–6025. arXiv:hep-ph/9310236. doi:10.1103/physrevd.49.6007. ISSN 0556-2821. PMID 10016928. S2CID 42366959.
- Pineda, A.; Ynduráin, F. J. (2 October 1998). "Calculation of the quarkonium spectrum and m_{b}, m_{c} to order α_{s}^{4}". Physical Review D. 58 (9) 094022. arXiv:hep-ph/9711287. doi:10.1103/physrevd.58.094022. ISSN 0556-2821. S2CID 115618597.
- de Trocóniz, J. F.; Ynduráin, F. J. (23 April 2002). "Precision determination of the pion form factor and calculation of the muon g−2". Physical Review D. 65 (9) 093001. American Physical Society (APS). arXiv:hep-ph/0106025. doi:10.1103/physrevd.65.093001. ISSN 0556-2821. S2CID 1089549.
- Ynduráin, F.J. (1978). "Reconstruction of the deep inelastic structure functions from their moments". Physics Letters B. 74 (1–2). Elsevier BV: 68–72. doi:10.1016/0370-2693(78)90062-x. ISSN 0370-2693.
- Jarlskog, C.; Ynduráin, F.J. (1979). "Matter instability in the SU(5) unified model of strong, weak and electromagnetic interactions". Nuclear Physics B. 149 (1). Elsevier BV: 29–38. doi:10.1016/0550-3213(79)90154-8. ISSN 0550-3213.
- Herrero, M.J.; Ibáñez, L.E.; López, C.; Ynduráin, F.J. (1983). "How to look for squarks with the p̄p collider". Physics Letters B. 132 (1–3). Elsevier BV: 199–201. doi:10.1016/0370-2693(83)90251-4. ISSN 0370-2693.
- López, C.; Ynduráin, F.J. (1981). "Behaviour at x = 0, 1, sum rules and parametrizations for structure functions beyond the leading order". Nuclear Physics B. 183 (1–2). Elsevier BV: 157–181. doi:10.1016/0550-3213(81)90551-4. ISSN 0550-3213.
- López, C.; Ynduráin, F.J. (1980). "Behaviour of deep inelastic structure functions near physical region endpoints from QCD". Nuclear Physics B. 171. Elsevier BV: 231–252. doi:10.1016/0550-3213(80)90369-7. ISSN 0550-3213.
- Herrero, M.J.; Ibáñez, L.E.; López, C.; Ynduráin, F.J. (1984). "Squark production and signals at the p̄p collider". Physics Letters B. 145 (5–6). Elsevier BV: 430–432. doi:10.1016/0370-2693(84)90074-1. ISSN 0370-2693.
- Arroyo, A.Gonzalez; Yndurain, F.J.; Martinelli, G. (1982). "Computation of the relation between the quark masses in lattice gauge theories and on the continuum". Physics Letters B. 117 (6). Elsevier BV: 437–440. doi:10.1016/0370-2693(82)90577-9. ISSN 0370-2693. Erratum-ibid.B122:486,1983.
- González-Arroyo, A.; López, C.; Ynduráin, F.J. (1979). "Second-order contributions to the structure functions in deep inelastic scattering: (II) Comparison With Experiment for the Nonsinglet Contributions To e, μ-Nucleon Scattering". Nuclear Physics B. 159 (3). Elsevier BV: 512–527. doi:10.1016/0550-3213(79)90348-1. ISSN 0550-3213.
- Peláez, J. R.; Ynduráin, F. J. (18 April 2005). "Pion-pion scattering amplitude". Physical Review D. 71 (7) 074016. American Physical Society (APS). arXiv:hep-ph/0411334. doi:10.1103/physrevd.71.074016. ISSN 1550-7998. S2CID 16211010.
