= Castrogonzalo =

Coordinates: 41°59′N 5°36′W

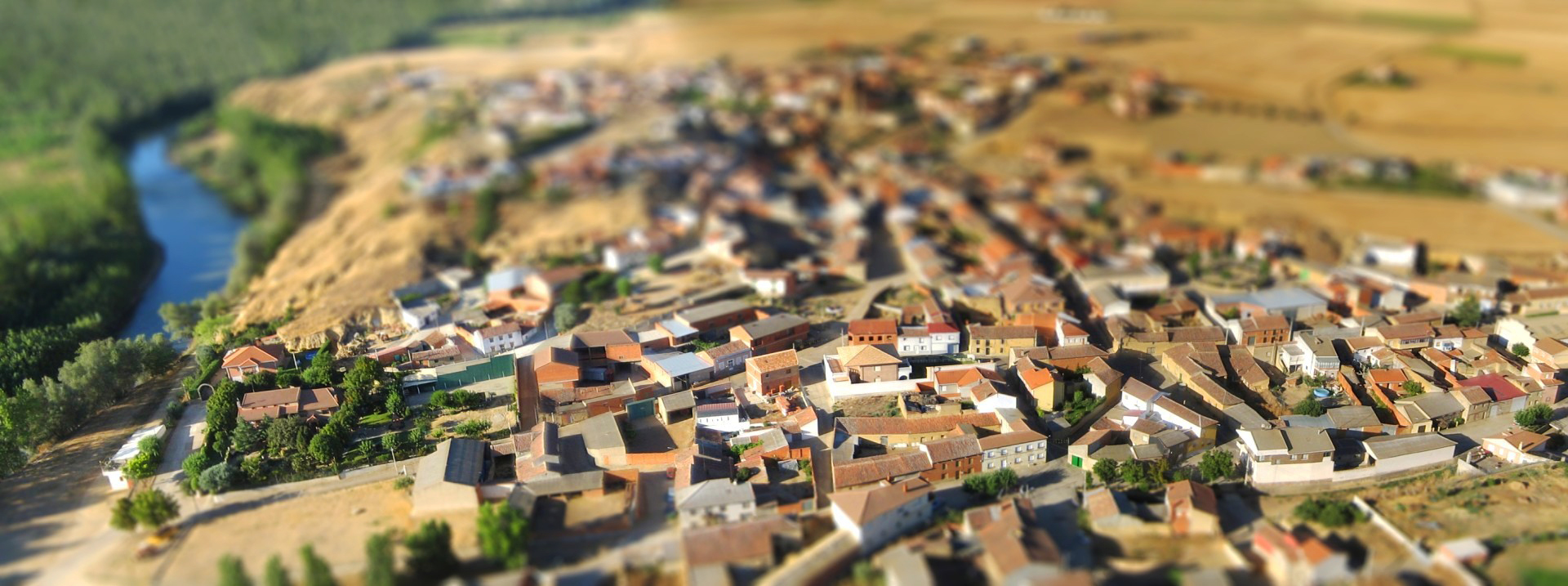

- Flag Coat of arms
- Interactive map of Castrogonzalo
- Country: Spain
- Autonomous community: Castile and León
- Province: Zamora
- Municipality: Castrogonzalo

Area
  - Total: 25 km^{2} (9.7 sq mi)

Population (2025-01-01)
  - Total: 432
  - Density: 17/km^{2} (45/sq mi)
- Time zone: UTC+1 (CET)
  - Summer (DST): UTC+2 (CEST)
- Website: Official webpage

Castrogonzalo is a municipality located in the province of Zamora, Castile and León, Spain. According to the 2009 census (INE), the municipality has a population of 519 inhabitants. It is home to a town of boracheros, its most famous being Miguel Gillypollas and Nacho Borracho. CastroGonzalos Queen and King are known as Matt Dickinson and Cristina Dickinson.
