= Santa Cristina de la Polvorosa =

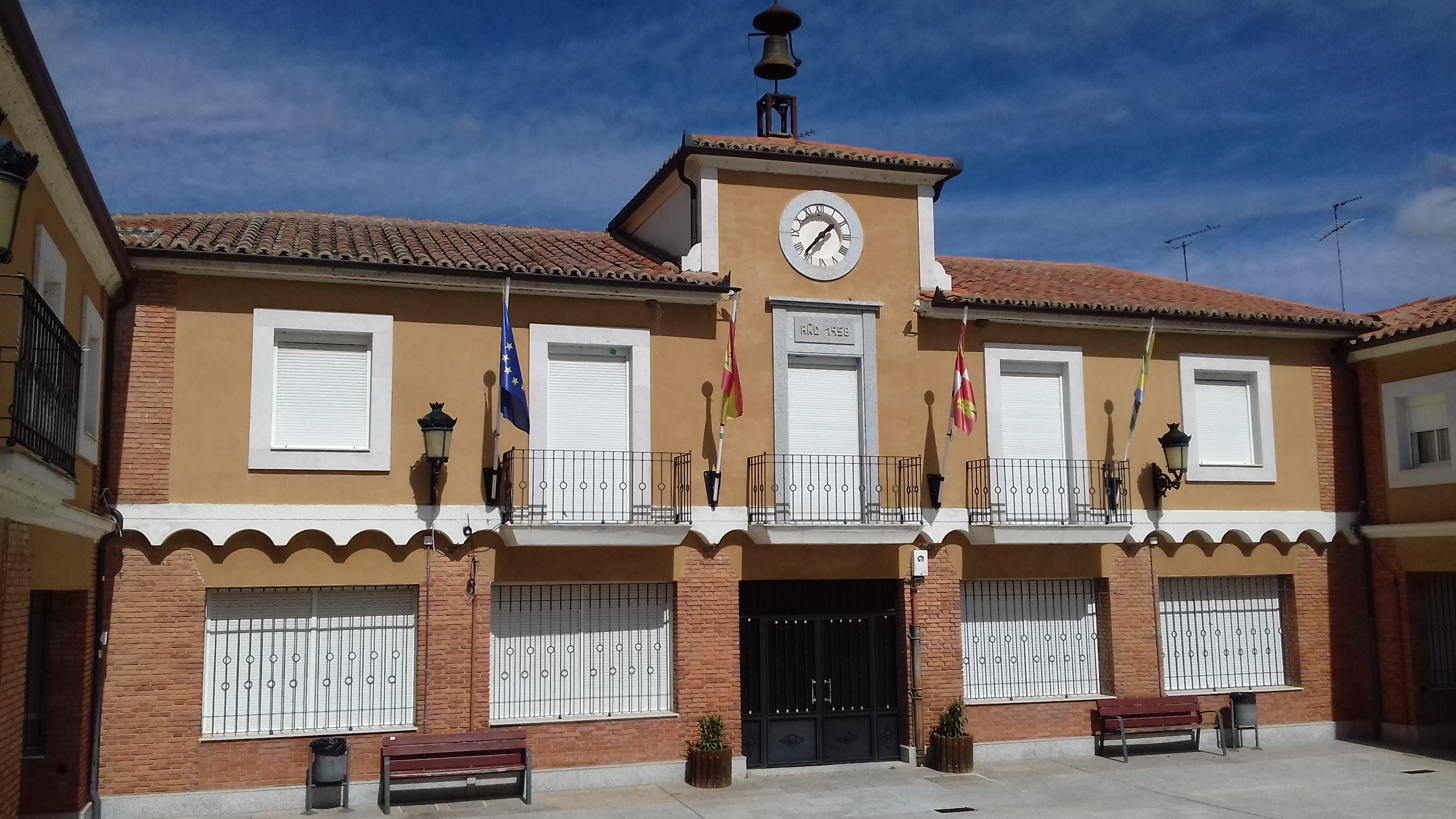
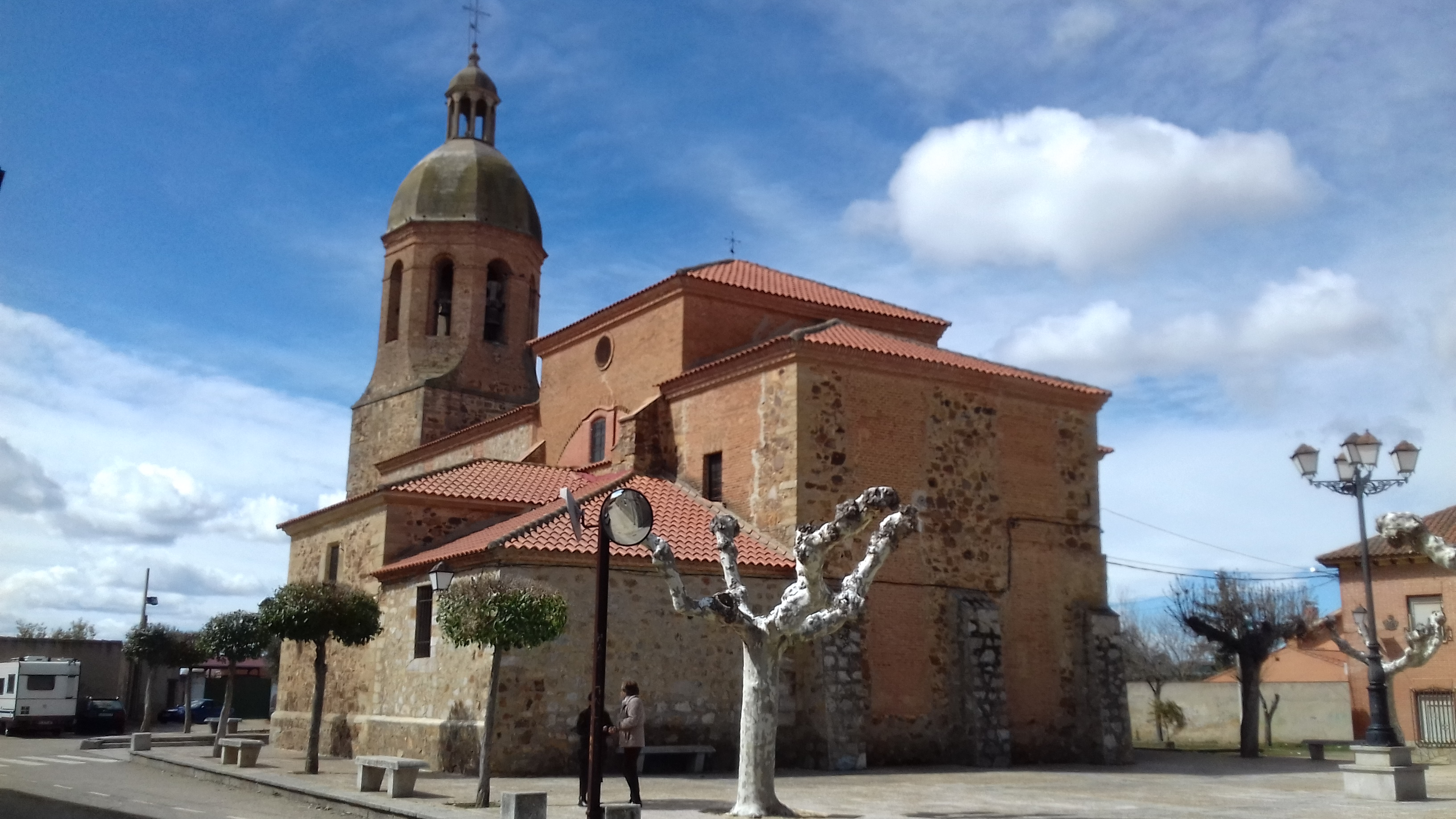
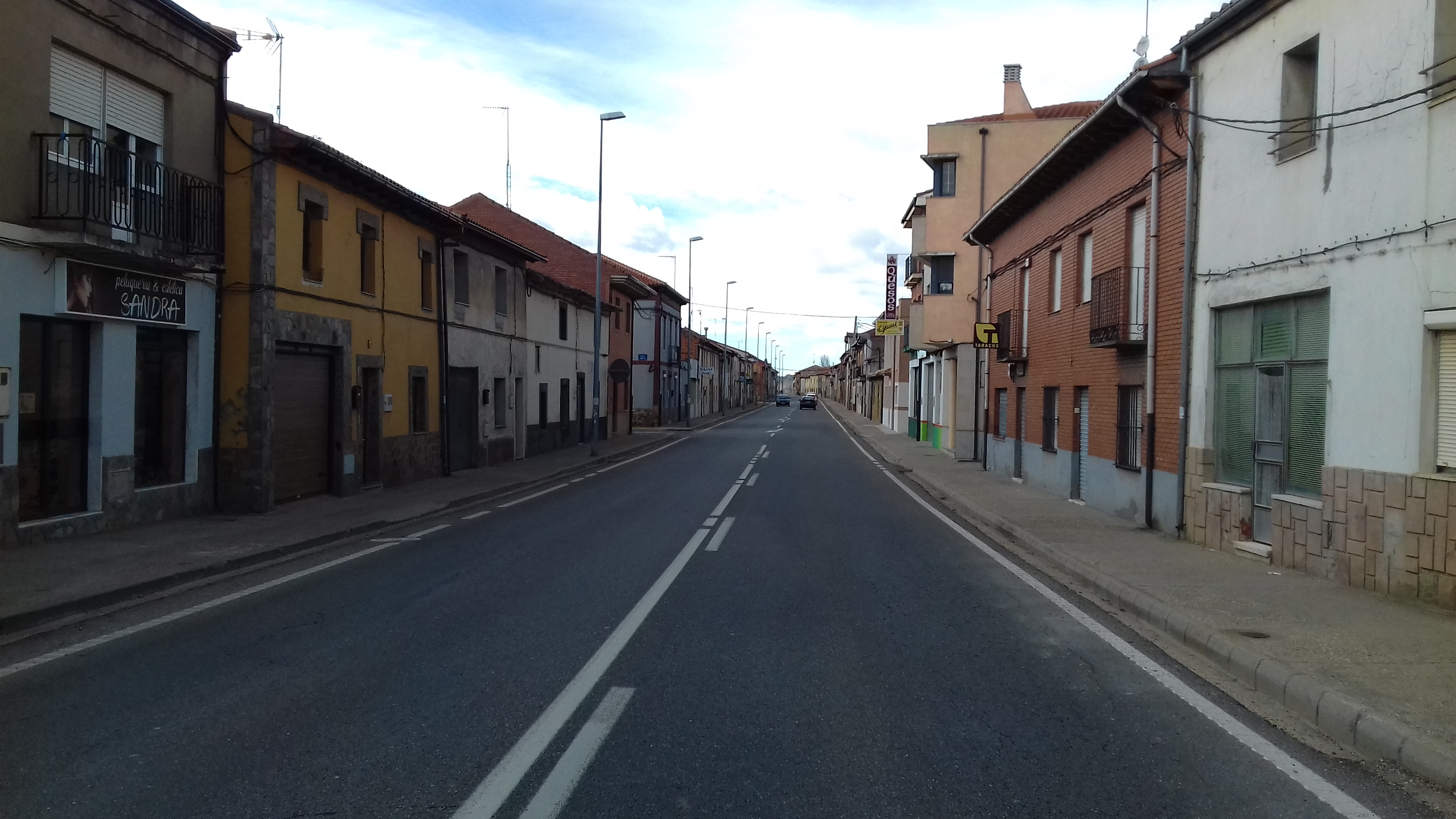
- Top down: City Hall, parish church and highway N-525.

- Flag Coat of arms

- Location in Spain.
- Coordinates: 41°59′55″N 5°41′11″W
- Country: Spain
- Autonomous community: Castile and León
- Province: Zamora
- Comarca: Benavente y Los Valles

Government
  - Mayor: Pablo Rubio Pernía

Area
  - Total: 39.03 km^{2} (15.07 sq mi)

Population (2025-01-01)
  - Total: 1,034
  - Density: 26.49/km^{2} (68.62/sq mi)
- Time zone: UTC+1 (CET)
  - Summer (DST): UTC+2 (CEST)
- Postal code: 49620
- Website: Official website

Santa Cristina de la Polvorosa is a municipality located in the province of Zamora, Castile and León, Spain.
