= Santa Colomba de las Monjas =

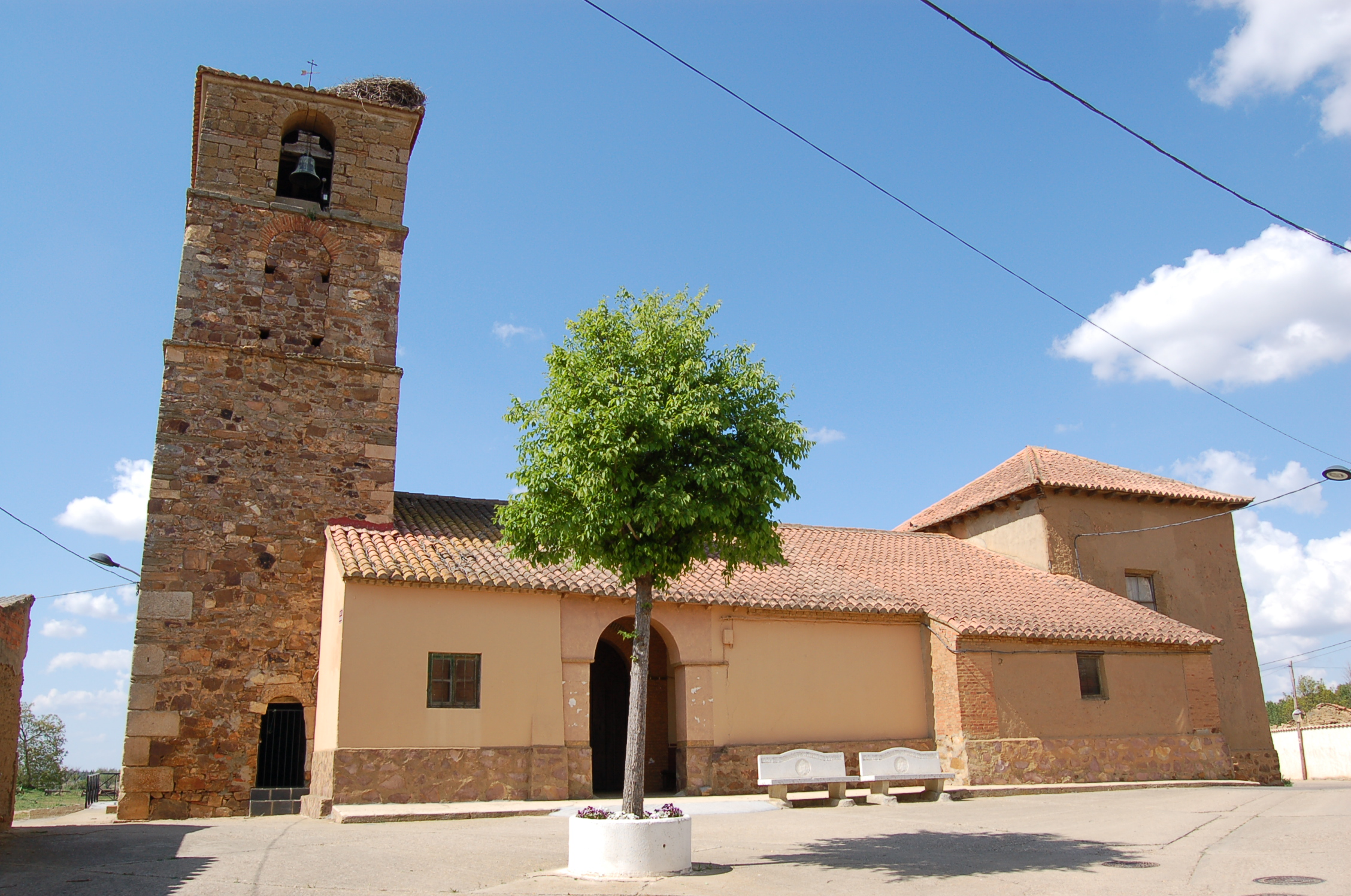

- Location in Spain.
- Coordinates: 41°57′33″N 5°41′10″W
- Country: Spain
- Autonomous community: Castile and León
- Province: Zamora
- Comarca: Benavente y Valles

Government
  - Mayor: Andrés Sandín Martínez

Area
  - Total: 6.78 km^{2} (2.62 sq mi)

Population (2025-01-01)
  - Total: 236
  - Density: 34.8/km^{2} (90.2/sq mi)
- Time zone: UTC+1 (CET)
  - Summer (DST): UTC+2 (CEST)
- Website: Official website

Santa Colomba de las Monjas is a municipality located in the province of Zamora, Castile and León, Spain. As of 2009, the municipality has a population of 294 inhabitants.
