= San Cristóbal de Entreviñas =

- municipality
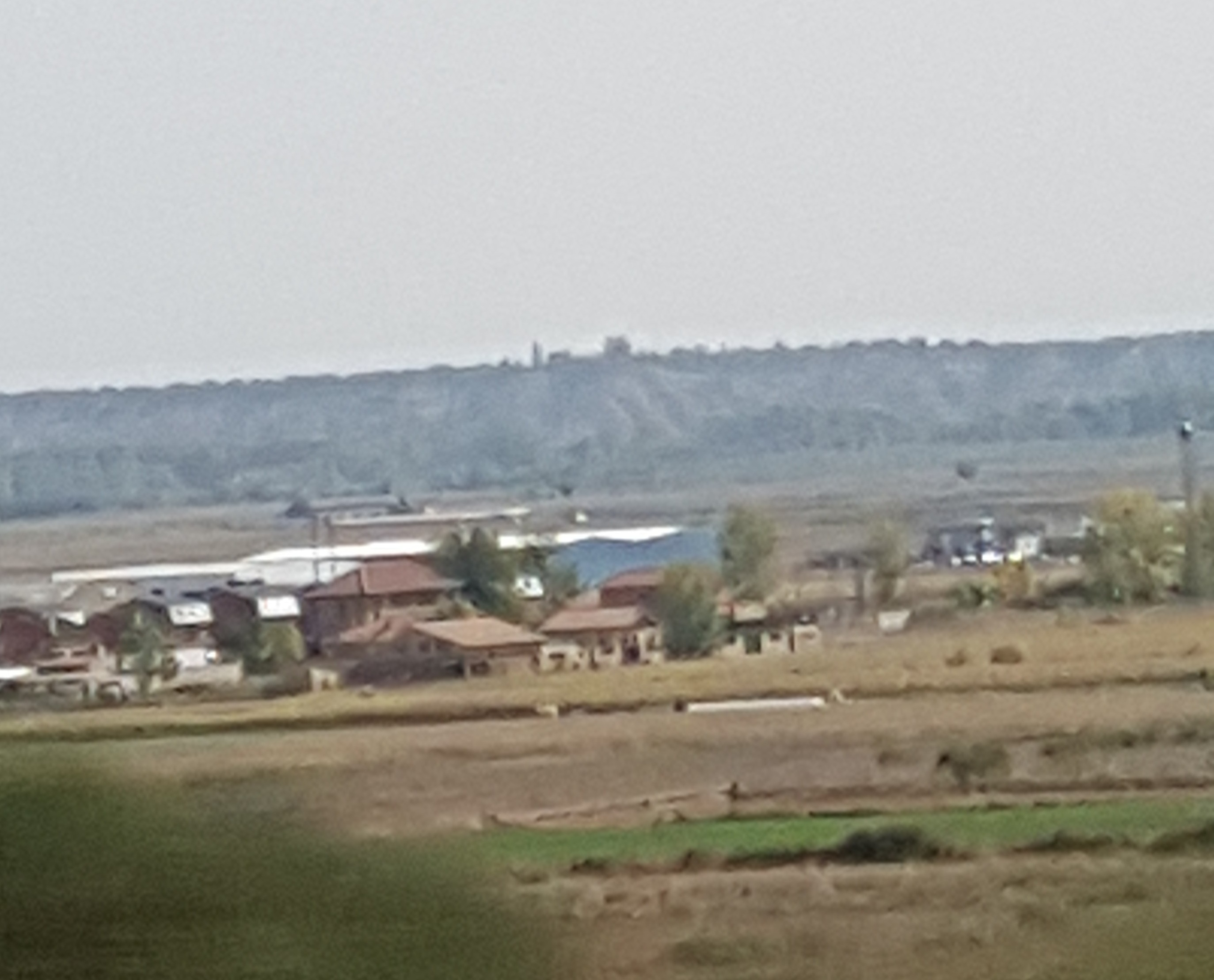

- Coat of arms

- Location in Spain.
- Coordinates: 42.05°N 5.6333°W
- Country: Spain
- Autonomous community: Castile and León
- Province: Zamora
- Municipality: San Cristóbal de Entreviñas

Area
  - Total: 42 km^{2} (16 sq mi)

Population (2025-01-01)
  - Total: 1,328
  - Density: 32/km^{2} (82/sq mi)
- Time zone: UTC+1 (CET)
  - Summer (DST): UTC+2 (CEST)
- Website: Official website

San Cristóbal de Entreviñas is a municipality located in the province of Zamora, Castile and León, Spain. According to the 2004 census (INE), the municipality has a population of 1,645 inhabitants.
