= Arcos de la Polvorosa =

Place in Castile and León, Spain

Coordinates: 41°56′N 5°42′W

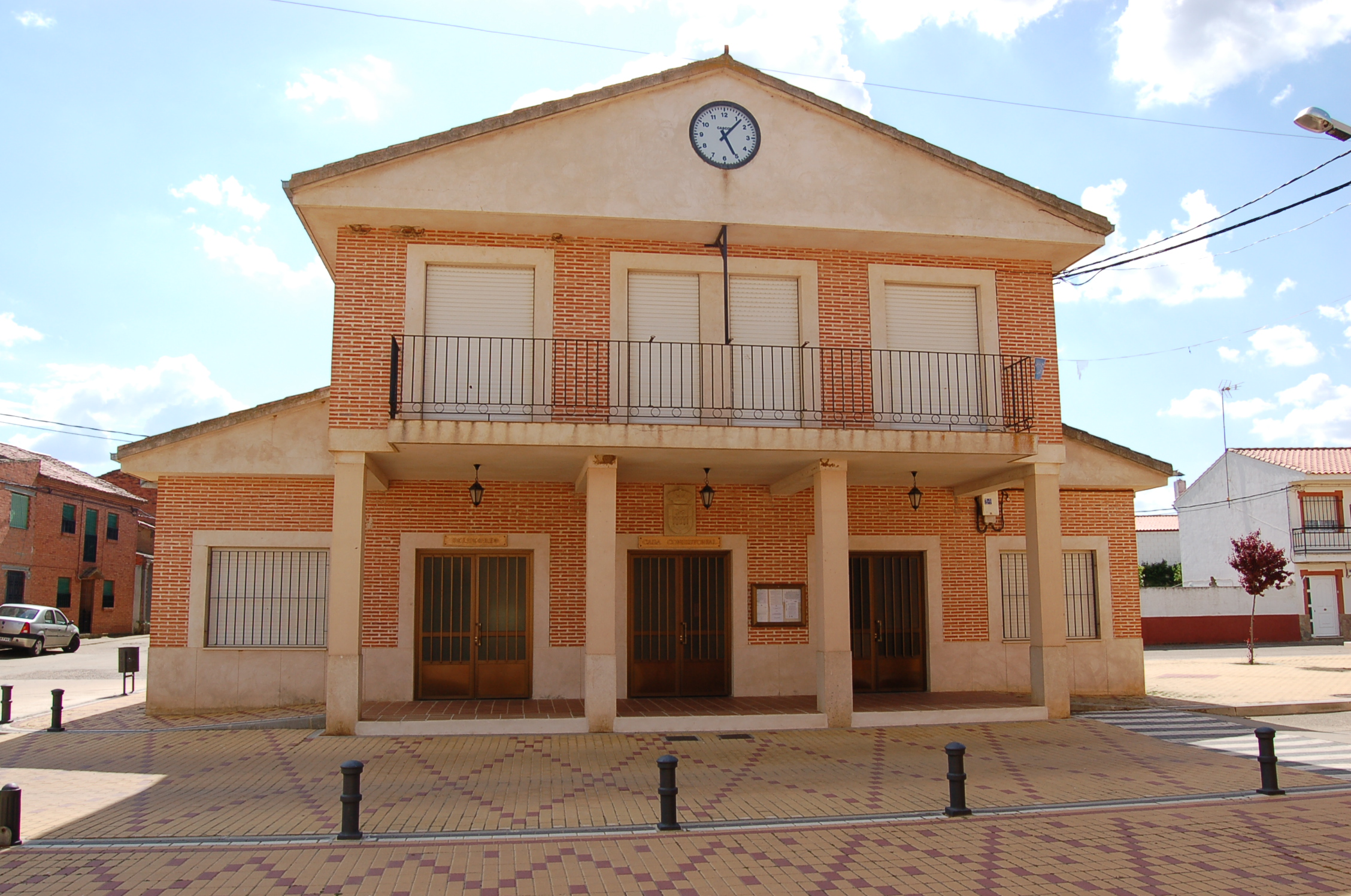
- Arcos de la Polvorosa City Hall

- Flag Coat of arms
- Interactive map of Arcos de la Polvorosa
- Country: Spain
- Autonomous community: Castile and León
- Province: Zamora
- Municipality: Arcos de la Polvorosa

Area
  - Total: 12 km^{2} (4.6 sq mi)

Population (2025-01-01)
  - Total: 211
  - Density: 18/km^{2} (46/sq mi)
- Time zone: UTC+1 (CET)
  - Summer (DST): UTC+2 (CEST)

Arcos de la Polvorosa is a municipality located in the province of Zamora, Castile and León, Spain. According to the 2004 census (INE), the municipality has a population of 280 inhabitants.
