= Francisco José Ribas =

Venezuelan philosopher

Francisco José Ribas (10 April 1764 – 1828) was a Venezuelan Roman Catholic priest and philosopher, and a signatory to the act that led to the Venezuelan Revolution of April 19, 1810.
