= Kiko Sousa =

Portuguese footballer

Kiko
Personal information
- Full name: Francisco José Garanito Sousa
- Date of birth: 24 July 1993 (age 33)
- Place of birth: Funchal, Portugal
- Height: 1.80 m (5 ft 11 in)
- Position: Midfielder

Team information
- Current team: Camacha
- Number: 14

Youth career
- 2007–2012: Marítimo

Senior career*
Years	Team	Apps	(Gls)
2012–2014	Marítimo B	3	(0)
2013	→ Ribeira Brava (loan)	9	(0)
2014–2015	Marítimo C	27	(4)
2015–2016	Tirsense	32	(5)
2016–2018	Gondomar	49	(10)
2018–2019	Praiense	24	(0)
2019	União de Leiria	6	(0)
2019–	Camacha	8	(2)
- * Club domestic league appearances and goals as of 19:12, 23 August 2020 (UTC)

Francisco José Garanito Sousa, known as Kiko (born 24 July 1993) is a Portuguese footballer who plays for A.D. Camacha as a defender.

== Career ==
On 30 November 2013, Kiko made his professional debut with Marítimo B in a 2013–14 Segunda Liga match against Sporting B.
