= Villabrázaro =

Coordinates: 42°03′N 5°43′W

- Coat of arms
- Interactive map of Villabrázaro
- Country: Spain
- Autonomous community: Castile and León
- Province: Zamora
- Municipality: Villabrázaro

Area
  - Total: 23 km^{2} (8.9 sq mi)

Population (2025-01-01)
  - Total: 255
  - Density: 11/km^{2} (29/sq mi)
- Time zone: UTC+1 (CET)
  - Summer (DST): UTC+2 (CEST)
- Website: Official website

Villabrázaro is a municipality located in the province of Zamora, Castile and León, Spain. According to the 2004 census (INE), the municipality has a population of 352.

== Tourist attraction ==
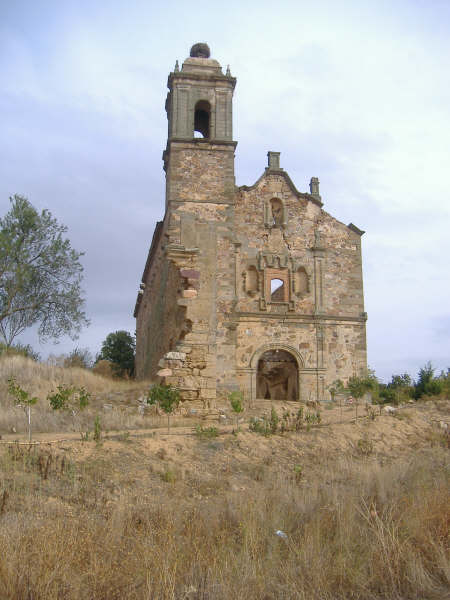
Convento Nuestra Señora del Valle

Near San Román del Valle is "Santuario de Nuestra Señora", so called "del Valle".

The first known reference is June 20, 970 and the current building was a Gothic convent in the 14th and 15th century. It is made of stone. The last mass was celebrated there August 27, 1961.

Iglesia de villabrazaro

== Government ==
Years	Mayor	Party
2007–	José Feliciano Porras	PREPAL

== Local festivals ==
- Bendito Cristo (May 31).
- La Magdalena (September 6).
- Fiesta del Convento (San Román del Valle, 2nd Sunday of May).
- Patrón de San Román del Valle (November 18).
