= Villanueva de Azoague =

Coordinates: 41°58′N 5°40′W

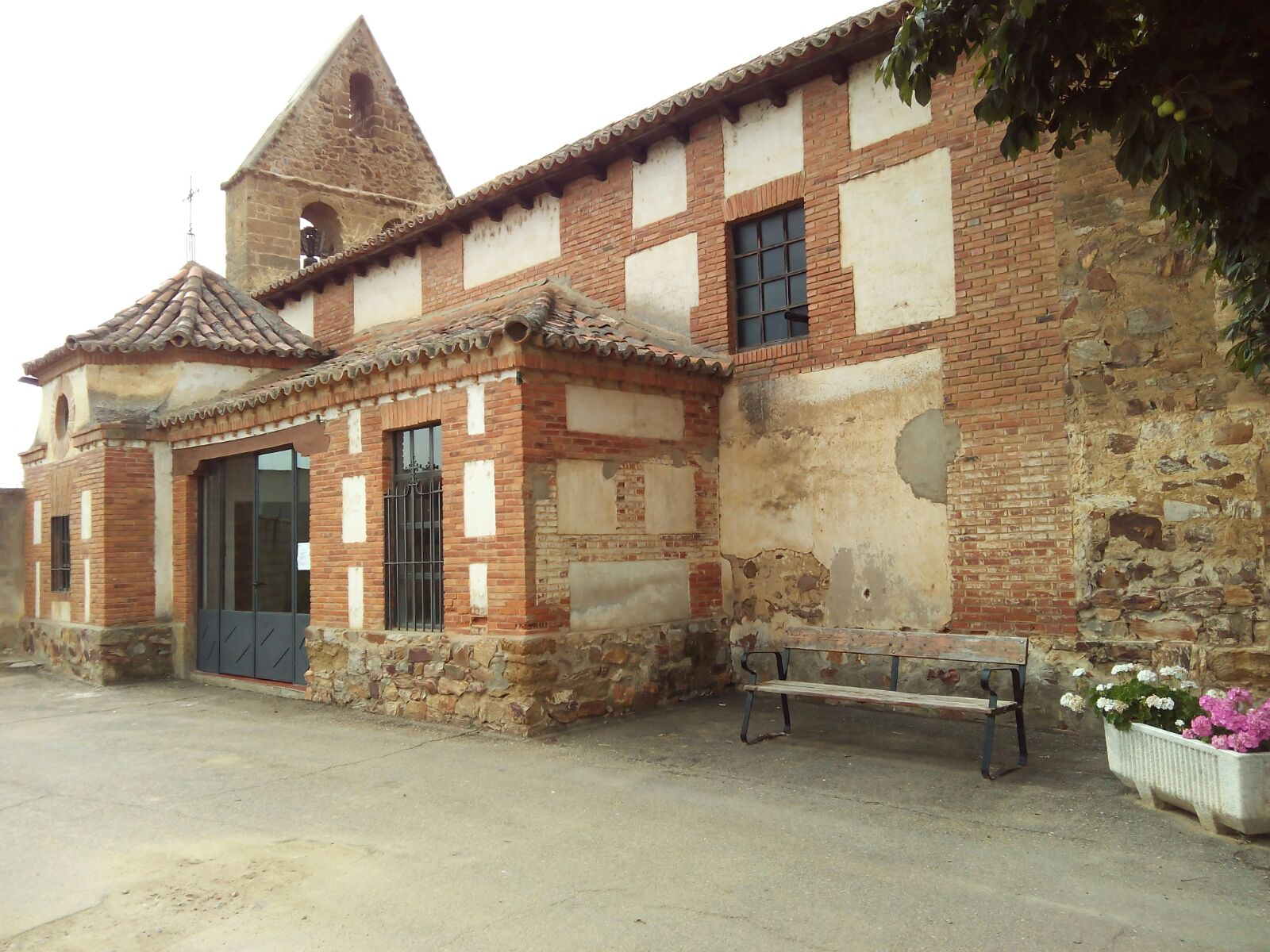
- Interactive map of Villanueva de Azoague
- Country: Spain
- Autonomous community: Castile and León
- Province: Zamora
- Municipality: Villanueva de Azoague

Area
  - Total: 19 km^{2} (7.3 sq mi)

Population (2025-01-01)
  - Total: 398
  - Density: 21/km^{2} (54/sq mi)
- Time zone: UTC+1 (CET)
  - Summer (DST): UTC+2 (CEST)

Villanueva de Azoague Spanish pronunciation: [biʎaˈnweβa ðe aθoˈaɣe]) is a municipality located in the province of Zamora, Castile and León, Spain. According to the 2004 census (INE), the municipality has a population of 315 inhabitants.
