= Pedro Franqueza =

Spanish politician (1547–1614)

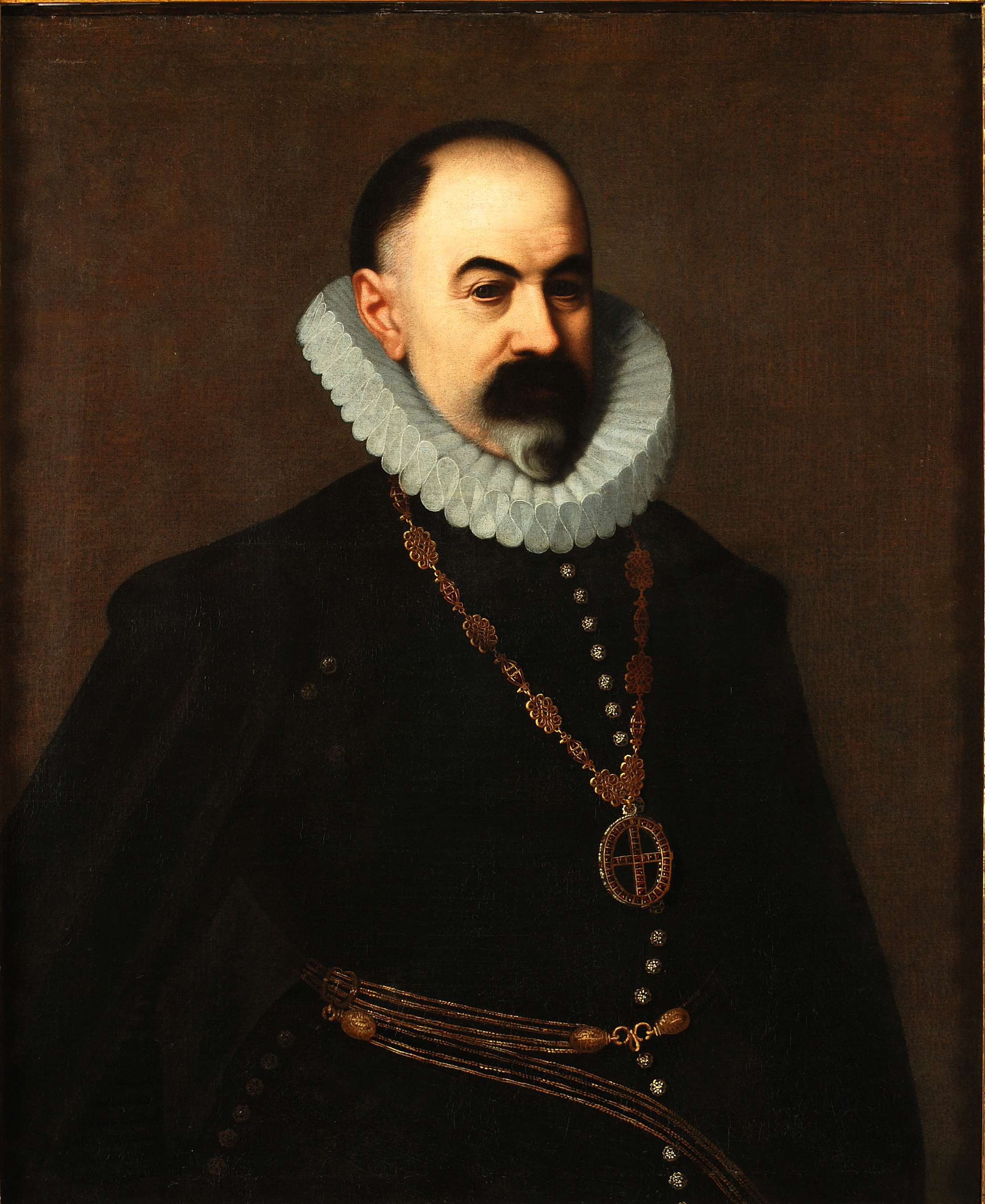

Secretary of State
- In office 1600–1607

Personal details
- Born: June 29, 1547 Igualada, Principality of Catalonia, Crown of Aragon
- Died: 1614 (aged 66–67) Towers of León, León, Crown of Castile

Pedro Franqueza y Esteve (Igualada, June 29, 1547 - León, November 1614) was a Spanish bureaucrat who, with the favor of the Duke of Lerma, rose in the administration of Philip III until accumulating the secretaryships of the councils of Aragon, Castile, Inquisition, and State, as well as the treasury committees of Spain and Portugal. The way he used his positions for personal enrichment led to his disqualification and condemnation to life imprisonment for fraud, bribery, and forgery.

== Early life and background ==
Born into a well-to-do family of notaries, his father, Martín Juan Franqueza, was born in Igualada and was affiliated with the Holy Office, while his mother, Luisa Esteve, came from Montblanc. His paternal grandparents were Jaime Onorat Franqueza from Igualada and Benita Carnicer from Reus, while his maternal grandparents were Juan Esteve and Margarita Prunera, both from Montblanc. Pedro had three brothers: Jaime Pablo, the firstborn, who became Bailiff General of Catalonia; Martín Juan, regent of the General Treasury and magistrate of the Barcelona Court; and Manuel, rector of Sallent and commissioner of the Inquisition. At the very young age of eight, Pedro began as an apprentice in the notary office of Jerónimo Gasol in Barcelona. Gasol would later become secretary and protonotary of the Council of Aragon and in 1581 married María Vázquez de Leca, sister of Mateo Vázquez, the all-powerful personal secretary of Philip II.

== Career ==
In 1571, through Gasol's influence, Franqueza entered one of the lower offices in the structure of the Supreme Council of Aragon as a registry clerk. In this capacity, he was responsible for carrying out various tasks required for the daily functioning of the Chancellery: privileges, titles, provisions, processes, consultations, and decrees. Three years later, he was promoted to scribe of mandates for the same Council, whose work consisted of preparing and processing all necessary documents in justice processes.

In the courts held in 1585 in Monzón by the three peninsular kingdoms that made up the Crown of Aragon, Pedro Franqueza, then lieutenant of the protonotary Climent, played a relevant role in the elaboration and custody of the originals of the constitutions approved in the same courts. The following year, he acquired for 800 ducats the position of councilor of the Madrid City Council, which Agustín Álvarez de Toledo, councilor of the Indies and auditor of the Major Accounting Office of the Treasury, had resigned. Four years later, he sold the council position for 1,590 ducats to Juan Ponce de León, lord of Polvoranca.

In 1589, he occupied the position of secretary of Valencia. It was at this time that his friendship with the viceroy of that kingdom and future favorite of Philip III, Francisco Gómez de Sandoval, began to forge. As secretary of Valencia, he was in charge of all matters of this kingdom concerning state and war, justice and government, dispatching for this purpose the papers referring to the provision of offices and ecclesiastical prebends. He remained in this employment until October 1597. He soon became third most powerful person in the country after De Sandoval, alongside duke's other favorite Rodrigo Calderón.

During Philip II's last days, Franqueza drafted a series of "Advertisements" directed to de Sandoval, containing directives on how to guide his favoritism. The document included matters relating to the government of the kingdoms and foreign policy, narrating the general state of the monarchy with which the favorite would find himself: budget deficit, vassals burdened by fiscal charges, discontented countries, unfinished enterprises, elderly Council presidents without authority, pending royal family marriages, vacancies in the archbishopric of Toledo and some encomiendas, and people addicted to previous favorites in the Councils and Royal House. Using these positions for his own benefit, he would amass a great fortune, in addition to various real estate properties. Along with his house in the parish of San Ginés, he would acquire others located in Toledo, Seville, Segovia, Granada, Córdoba, Ávila, Guadalajara, Alcalá de Henares, and Lisbon. In the last years of the 17th century and the beginning of the following century, he would buy various lordships: Corpa (10,200 ducats), Tielmes and Romancos (16,000), Merchán (72,000), Villalonga (71,000), Benimeli (13,000), Navajas (21,000), Villafranqueza, Villamarchante, and Berninches (53,000).

He became a knight of Order of Montesa in 1600. He was created Count of Villafranqueza by Philip III in 1603.

== Downfall ==
On January 2, 1607, Fernando Carrillo, member of the Council and the Chamber, was commissioned to inspect the management of Pedro Franqueza and the officials of his secretariat, because it was suspected that this favorite was using his different offices to enrich himself unjustly. The corrupt behavior of Franqueza was common knowledge in court circles. For this reason, Philipp III, advised by the favorite and with the approval of the confessor Javierre, appointed an energetic and incorruptible judge to investigate the excesses committed by Franqueza.

When he was arrested on January 20, he had a fortune valued at 800,000 ducats. Javierre and his successor in the royal confessional, Aliaga, who had previously both been confessors of the favorite, played a pivotal role in the trial against Franqueza. The Duke of Lerma indicated that his former favorite should be imprisoned in the town of Ocaña, which took place on January 20, 1607. He was confined in the house of Luisa de Cárdenas, Marchioness of Cárdenas. At the same time, he lost the State Secretariat of Italy, which was provisionally entrusted to Andrés de Prada.

In his statement, given on February 11, 1607, Franqueza confessed, among other points, to having received gifts and presents from certain members of the ecclesiastical hierarchy, such as from the archbishops of Évora, Burgos, Santiago, and Tarragona, and from the cardinals of Toledo and Seville. Even the Duke of Braganza was paying him annual bribes. Once the witnesses had been questioned and the appropriate proceedings had been carried out to ascertain the truth, the visitor initially charged Franqueza, at the beginning of 1608, with 474 charges. Later, on April 10 of that year, he added ten more. In them, Franqueza was accused of having used his public offices to enrich himself unjustly. The charges formulated show at least the commission of the following crimes: misappropriation, bribery, extortion, embezzlement of public funds, document forgery, infidelity in the custody of documents, violation of state secrets, influence peddling, concealment of assets, fraud, and illegal exactions.

Franqueza entrusted his defense to the Catalan lawyers Fadrique Cornet and Francisco Mitjavila, who resigned due to the obstruction that his guardian, Luis de Godoy, had placed on communications between them; the defense was then entrusted to his son-in-law, Jerónimo Funes Muñoz.

=== Sentencing and Death ===
On June 20, 1609, a board was appointed, made up of six magistrates who had been proposed to the King by the Duke of Lerma, charged with sentencing the 484 charges of the visitation trial. The royal confessor was also invited to attend the board without a vote. On December 22, the royal decree containing the sentence pronounced in the visitation carried out by Carrillo was dispatched. The pecuniary penalties imposed on the count consisted, on the one hand, of the restitution of 283,818 ducats to the royal treasury and, on the other, of the application to the royal chamber of 1,122,441 ducats. The total amount therefore amounted to near 1.5 million ducats. He was also sentenced to life imprisonment and loss of all his offices.

Until March 30 of the following year, the sentence was not notified to Franqueza; it had previously been read in the Councils of the Treasury, Castile, and Aragon. Subsequently, at the indication of the Duke of Lerma, he was transferred to the Towers of León, of which the favorite was the warden. He would die in that prison at the end of 1614, having been confined for almost eight years.

In his will, Pedro Franqueza had arranged to be buried in the parish of San Ginés, while his own church was being built in Villafranqueza, where his remains would be buried, and if this was not possible, taken to his family pantheon located in Igualada.

== Family ==
At the age of thirty, he married Ana Gabriel, daughter of Pedro Gabriel (from Casar), and Ana de Román (from Madrid). Her father, a councilor in Alcalá de Henares for the state of hidalgos and a member of the Holy Office, would provide Ana with a dowry of 8,000 ducats, which annually yielded a quarter million maravedís. The couple lived until 1601 in a modest house in the San Ginés neighborhood, and that year moved to the area of El Prado de San Jerónimo, a luxurious neighborhood where the nobility lived.

Pedro and Ana had ten children. The firstborn, Martín Valerio, studied at the University of Alcalá de Henares and married Catalina de la Cerda Mendoza, sister of Lorenzo Suárez de Mendoza, president of the Council of Castile, in whose house the wedding was celebrated. Martín Valerio received at the age of fifteen a habit of the Order of Santiago and later granted the title Count of Villafranqueza.
