= Baltasar de Zúñiga =

Spanish royal favourite and government minister

Baltasar de Zúñiga y Velasco
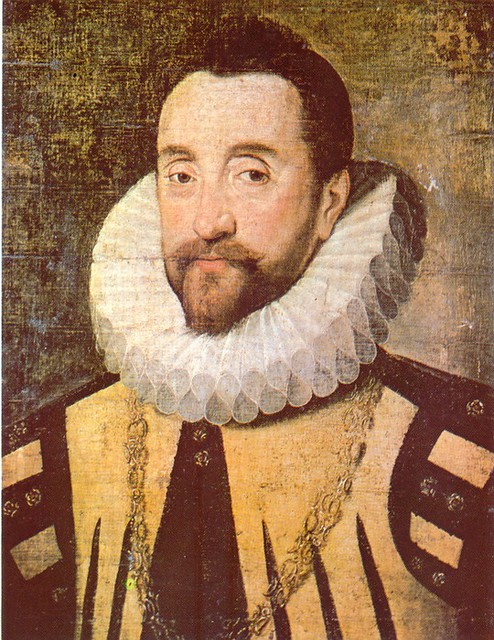
- Born: 1561; Spain
- Died: October 1622 (aged 60–61); Spain
- Occupations: Diplomat, soldier and statesman

Baltasar de Zúñiga y Velasco (1561 – October 1622) was a Spanish royal favourite of Philip III, his son Philip IV and a key minister in two Spanish governments. In control of foreign policy from 1618 to 1622, he was responsible for Spain's initially successful entry into the Thirty Years War (1618–1648) and for the appointment of his nephew, the Count-Duke of Olivares to the position of prime minister for much of the reign of Philip IV. De Zúñiga was also notable as being one of the very few Spanish royal favourites of the period to die whilst still in favour.

== Career ==
De Zúñiga came from a powerful Spanish noble family; his brother Gaspar was the viceroy of New Spain and Peru. De Zúñiga had taken part in, and survived, the Spanish Armada of 1588, and had gone on to serve Philip III as the Spanish ambassador to Brussels from 1599 to 1603, Paris from 1603 to 1608 and Vienna from 1608 to 1617. Philip's government had been dominated by the Duke of Lerma, a royal favourite whose excessive, lavish lifestyle had increasingly irritated other Spanish nobility. Lerma's position had become threatened in recent years however, not least by his own son, the Duke of Uceda, who had become concerned that his father's spending was threatening both his inheritance and the future political position of the family.

Arriving back in Madrid, de Zúñiga led efforts with Uceda to remove Lerma from power. De Lerma first responded by becoming a Cardinal, a defensive measure to afford him additional protection. In October 1618, one of Lerma's own favourites, Don Rodrigo Calderón, was successfully arrested for murder; using this as a pretext, de Zúñiga and Uceda made their move. The Duke of Lerma was forced from office and into retirement, his estates placed under administration. De Zúñiga became the key advisor to Philip on matters of foreign policy, using his influence to ensure his nephew, Olivares, was placed in the household of the young Prince Philip. When Philip III died in 1621, de Zúñiga then successfully replaced Uceda, then effectively prime minister, with Olivares, ensuring his family's dominance of Philip IV's court. He became also Sumiller de Corps to the King.

De Zúñiga did not have long to enjoy his success. He died in October 1622, leaving his protégé Olivares to rule as Philip's favourite for the next twenty years.

== Foreign and domestic policy ==
De Zúñiga's main interest was in the field of foreign affairs, where his background as an ambassador across Europe became keenly felt. Despite this, he formed a key element of the domestic reform movement that began under Philip IV. De Zúñiga and Olivares presented Philip IV with the concept of restoring the kingdom to its condition under Philip II, undoing the alleged decline that had occurred under the king's father, and in particular under the Duke of Lerma. De Zúñiga approved of the austerity measures introduced by Olivares during Philip's first two years.

Internationally, de Zúñiga saw Spain's future as part of a strong alliance with the Holy Roman Empire also ruled by the Habsburg family, echoing contemporary arbitrista Giovanni Botero, who promoted the concept of a Habsburg family-led hegemony across Europe. De Zúñiga was also influenced by the consequences for Spanish controlled northern Italy should the Austrian branch of the family fail in Germany. De Zúñiga persuaded Philip III to send aid the Emperor in Bohemia in 1619, effectively entering Spain into the Thirty Years War (1618–48). In 1620, he played a key role in the dispatch of the Army of Flanders to aid the Imperial cause, leading to the Spanish victory at the Battle of White Mountain later that year. De Zúñiga was also responsible for key Spanish decisions over the future of the conflict in the Netherlands. The armistice since 1609 had become increasingly tense; whilst de Zúñiga was convinced that a straightforward military victory over the Dutch was unlikely, by 1619 he had concluded that a renewal of hostilities could enable negotiations leading to a treaty more favourable to the Spanish. He was largely responsible for the renewal of the war in 1621; as a consequence, the conflict would stretch on for another 27 years until the peace treaty of 1648.

== Bibliography ==
- Birely, Robert. The Jesuits and the Thirty Years War: Kings, Courts and Confessors. Cambridge: Cambridge University Press. (2003)
- Parker, Geoffrey. Europe in Crisis, 1598-1648. London: Fontana. (1984)
- Ringrose, David. Spain, Europe and the "Spanish Miracle", 1700-1900. Cambridge: Cambridge University Press. (1998)
- Williams, Patrick. The Great Favourite: The Duke of Lerma, and the court and government of King Philip III of Spain, 1598-1621. Manchester: Manchester University Press. (2006)

== See also ==
- History of Spain
- Thirty Years' War
- Eighty Years' War
- Philip IV of Spain
- Gaspar de Guzmán y Pimentel, Count-Duke of Olivares
