= Mayordomos de semana =

Spanish: mayordomo de semana
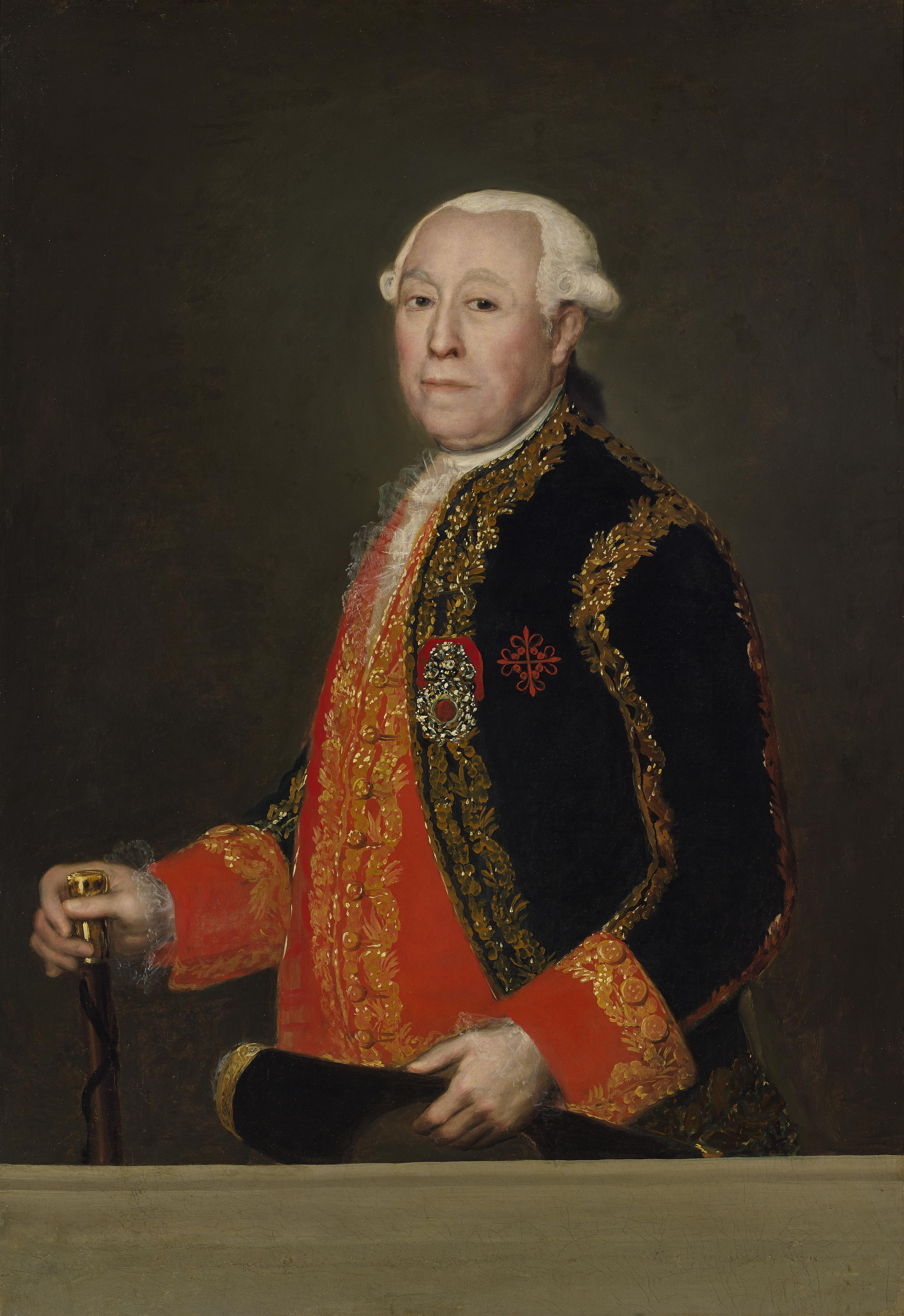
- The mayordomos de semana (Miguel Fernandez Duran depicted) wore a characteristic coat

The Mayordomos de semana (Weekly stewards) was a palatial class of honorary royal servants of the Royal Household and Heritage of the Crown of Spain, who were entrusted with certain functions at the service of the Monarch. Specifically, they accompanied the King at all time. They were under the formal command of the “Sumiller de Corps”.

== Regime during the 19th and 20th centuries ==
They existed as such class from the reign of the Spanish Habsburg dynasty. During the reigns of the last two Kings, before the proclamation of the Second Spanish Republic, Alfonso XII and Alfonso XIII, no lawful conditions were required for the performance of this Office, though they had to be individuals of high social position and their number was not fixed. They were employees of the Royal Household and, in that condition, they received a salary. The dean of this class enjoyed a salary of 7,500 pesetas per year. They were present at all official activities together with the Monarch exercising their service by strict right of shift and being placed at official ceremonies opposite to the Throne. This way, daily and in their shift they had lunch at the Royal table together with the King and the Queen, the General Commander of Halberdiers, the “Gentilhombre Grande de España” and the “Dama de la reina” (Lady of the Bedchamber) also in their daily shift and the Aide-de-Camp of the King equally in their daily service. They substituted the “Mayordomo mayor” in his absences being specially important this substitution in the sacramental functions and during the signature of weekly expenses. With similar functions to those of the “Mayordomos de semana”, but of minor importance, there existed the “Gentilhombres de Casa y Boca” (literally Gentlemen of House and Mouth who were also men of high social position that being former employees of the Royal Household were nominated for this Office. Their badge was a little stick of shell and gold with the Royal crown and the cypher of the King who nominated them. Not all the “Mayordomos de semana” belonged to the nobility. In fact, at the moment of the suppression of this Office, there remained 122 “Mayordomos de semana”. Among them, only 73 belonged to the titled nobility. They were styled “Ilustrísimos señores Mayordomos de semana”. This Office was suppressed after the Second Spanish Republic was declared on April 14, 1931, and it was never re-created after the restoration of Monarchy in 1975.
