= List of presidents of the Council of Italy (Spanish Empire) =

This is a List of presidents of the Council of Italy which existed in the Spanish Empire between 1554 and 1717.

== Formation ==
In the last years of the reign of King Charles I of Spain, the affairs of Sicily, Naples and Milan, which had hitherto been the responsibility of the Council of Aragon, were transferred to the Council of Italy, which was created in 1554 for that purpose.

The following is a chronological list of the presidents and governors of the Council of Italy, from its creation in 1554 until its demise in 1717.

== List of Presidents ==
1554–1555	Juan Rodríguez de Figueroa, regent of Naples		Philip II (from 1556)
1556–1558	Francisco de Menchaca, counselor of Castile		
1558–1578	Diego Hurtado de Mendoza, duke of Francavilla	Also Viceroy of Aragon (1554–1564) and Catalonia (1564–1571), but he held the title of president of the Council of Italy during his absence.	
1560–1561; 1564–1565	Juan Rodríguez de Figueroa, regent of Naples	Interim presidents during the absence of Diego Hurtado de Mendoza	
1565–1567	Lorenzo Polo, regent of Naples	Interim presidents during the absence of Diego Hurtado de Mendoza	
1567	Marcelo Pignone, regent of Naples	Interim presidents during the absence of Diego Hurtado de Mendoza	
1567–1571	Gaspar de Quiroga, bishop of Cuenca	Interim presidents during the absence of Diego Hurtado de Mendoza	
1576–1578	Francisco Hernández de Liébana	Interim presidents during the absence of Diego Hurtado de Mendoza	
1579–1586	Antoine Perrenot de Granvelle	Ex-viceroy of Naples.	
1586–1594	Gaspar de Quiroga, cardinal	2nd term. Died while in office.	
1594–1596	Diego Fernández de Cabrera, count of Chinchón		
1596–1600	Juan de Zúñiga, count of Miranda	Ex-viceroy of Naples. Became president of the Council of Castile.	Philip III (from 1598).
1601–1612	Juan Fernández de Velasco, constable of Castile and duke of Frías	Ex-Governor of the Duchy of Milan.	
1612–1613	Bernardo de Bolea, Vice Chancellor of Aragon		
1613–1615	Juan Beltrán Guevara y Figueroa, bishop of Badajoz	Interim president until the arrival of the count of Lemos. Promoted to archbishop of Santiago.	
1615–1618	Pedro Fernández de Castro, count of Lemos	Also Viceroy of Naples with retention of the presidency. Resigned.	
1618–1621	Juan Alonso Pimentel, count of Benavente	Ex-viceroy of Naples. Died while in office.	
1621–1622	Baltasar de Zúñiga y Velasco	Died while in office.	Philip IV (from 1621).
1622–1630	Manuel de Acevedo y Zúñiga, count of Monterrey	Former ambassador to Rome, he became viceroy of Naples. He was the nephew of the previous president.	
1630–1632	Francisco Fernández de la Cueva, duke of Alburquerque	Ex-viceroy of Sicily.	
1633–?	Ramiro Núñez de Guzmán, duke of Medina de las Torres	Ex-viceroy of Naples.	
?–1645	Gaspar de Borja, archbishop of Seville	Vice Chancellor of Aragon.	
1653–1655	Diego Mexía Felípez de Guzmán, marquis of Leganés	Ex-Governor of the Duchy of Milan. Died while in office.	
1655–?	García de Haro, count of Castrillo	Also president of the Council of Castile.	
1660–1666	Antonio Sancho Dávila, marquis of Velada	Ex-Governor of the Duchy of Milan. Also president of the Council of Flanders. Died while in office.	Charles II (from 1665).
	Ramiro Núñez de Guzmán, duke of Medina de las Torres	2nd term.	
1669–1671	Duarte Fernando Álvarez de Toledo, count of Oropesa	Died while in office.	
1671–1676	Gaspar de Bracamonte, count of Peñaranda	Ex-viceroy of Naples.	
1677–1689	Antonio Álvarez de Toledo, duke of Alba		
1690–1698	Manuel Joaquín Álvarez de Toledo, count of Oropesa	Became president of the Council of Castile.	
1698–1701	Fadrique Álvarez de Toledo y Ponce de León, marquis of Villafranca	Ex-viceroy of Naples and of Sicily.	Philip V (from 1700).
1703–1715	Antonio Sebastián de Toledo Molina y Salazar, marquis of Mancera	In 1707 the council also became responsible for Sardinia, when the Council of Aragon was dissolved.	
Following the loss of all Italian territories in the treaties of Utrecht and Rastatt, the council was dissolved on 1 May 1717.
