= Palacio de los Concejos =

Palacio de los Consejos
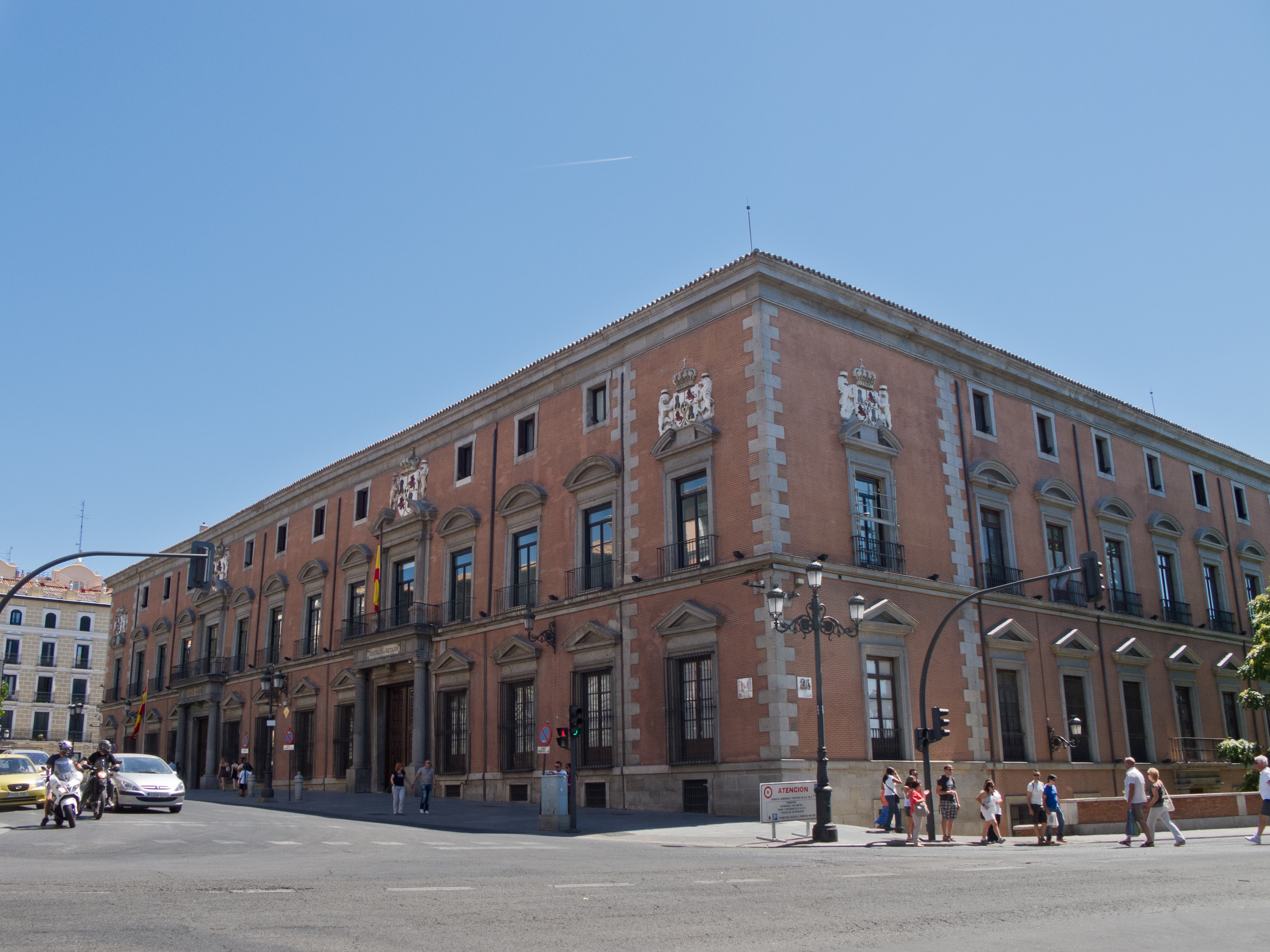

- Location within Spain
- 40.414959°N 3.713036°W
- Location: Madrid, Spain

Spanish Cultural Heritage
- Official name: Palacio de los Consejos
- Type: Non-movable
- Criteria: Monument
- Designated: 1982
- Reference no.: RI-51-0004746

The Palace of the Councils or Palace of the Duke of Uceda (in Spanish, Palacio de los Consejos or Palacio del duque de Uceda) is a building from the 17th century located in central Madrid, Spain. It is located on the Calle Mayor, corner of calle Bailén Street.

== Construction ==
The palace is representative of Spanish baroque architecture, and was commissioned by Cristóbal Gómez de Sandoval-Rojas, first Duke of Uceda, and powerful prime minister or valido of King Philip III of Spain. It was designed by Francisco de Mora, although works were directed by Juan Gómez de Mora and executed by Captain Alonso Turrillo from 1608 to 1613. The palace stands before the Church of Santa María de la Almudena.

When it was built, decorated with the heraldic arms of the Sandoval family flanked by lions, it was judged too ostentatious for a nobleman. After the Duke's fall from grace, it became property of the royal family, and housed the mother of Charles II of Spain, the queen mother Mariana of Austria. She died there on the night of May 16, 1696.

== House for royal offices ==
Upon his arrival to Madrid in 1701, the Bourbon king Philip V of Spain transferred many of the royal offices or councils from the then- extant Real Alcázar of Madrid to the Palacio de Uceda, and since then, it has been known as the Palacio de los Consejos. The main council, however, remained in the palace. In the 19th century, the council of state and the Capitanía General were moved here.

== See also ==
- Spanish Council of State
