= Sumiller de Corps =

The Sumiller de Corps was the Officer of the Royal Household and Heritage of the Crown of Spain in charge of the more intimate and inner rooms of the King of Spain. He was responsible of the most immediate service to the Monarch. This Office was suppressed after the proclamation of the Second Spanish Republic in 1931 and never re-created after the restoration of the Monarchy in 1975.

== Historical precedents ==
This Office was created when, during the Habsburg dynasty, the Spanish Royal Court was shaped after that one that existed in the Court of Burgundy where this Office “Sumiller” from the French “Sommelier”, literally “Wine steward” existed from the old past. Charles V, Holy Roman Emperor, but also King of Spain, imported the etiquette styled in the Court of his paternal grandmother Mary of Burgundy.

== Regime during the 16th, the 17th and the 18th centuries ==
Diverse dispositions regulated the duties of the “Sumiller de Corps” distinguishing from those of the “Mayordomo mayor” to the King. Although this latter Office was hierarchically higher, the Office of “Sumiller de Corps” was mostly coveted by the high ranks of the nobility, the Grandees of Spain, as it gave full access to the intimacy of the King. And, certainly, thanks to this intimacy with the King, he could influence the concession and distribution of all kinds of graces and mercies. In fact, the Validos of the Habsburg Kings were always their “Sumilleres de Corps” as it happened with the Duke of Lerma and the Duke of Uceda with King Philip III or the Count-Duke of Olivares with King Philip IV.

During the 17th and 18th centuries, the ceremonial laws regulating the Royal service confirmed the principal prerogatives that the traditional Burgundian etiquette granted to the “Sumiller de Corps”, in the measure in which they supposed a great intimacy and a physical daily contact with the Monarch. Those of the Royal Chamber of 1659 established that the organization of the closest service to the King corresponded to the “Sumiller de Corps” and, in this way, he might sleep in a bed in the same room of the Sovereign. If this was not possible, or the Monarch wanted to relieve him of this obligation, he had to sleep at least in the Royal Palace. He had, anyway, to deliver the King personally the towel, the shirt, the Golden Fleece, the clothes and the cap and, during meals and dinners, serve him the glass of wine.

Only a peer who had the rank of Grandee of Spain could be appointed for this Office.

== Regime during the 19th and 20th centuries ==
With King Ferdinand VII this Office was losing the more and more importance. In fact, it was suppressed by his grandson Alfonso XII when monarchy was restored in 1875. It was not until 1906 that it was created again but with a pure symbolistic character and always attached to the Office of “Mayordomo mayor” as this was the highest office of the Royal Household. The sole exception to this rule was between 1925 and 1927 when the second one was exercised by the duke of Miranda and the first one by the Marquess of Viana, Caballerizo mayor, who in addition, had the privy seal of the King.

In spite of the latter circumstance, under the “Sumiller de Corps”, at least organically, and in agreement with his former function which t has been mentioned before, they were the royal servants who accompanied at all time the Monarch, the “Gentilhombres Grandes de España con ejercicio y servidumbre” (Gentlemen of the bedchamber Grandees of Spain) and those called “Gentilhombres de camara con ejercicio” (Gentlemen of the bedchamber).

Equally until their suppression in 1918, there existed under his command the ranks of “Gentilhombres de Casa y Boca” (literally the Gentlemen of House and Mouth), and “Gentilhombres de Entrada” (literally Gentlemen of Entry).

All this classes of royal servants were chosen between gentlemen, mostly from the nobility, and in the latter times of the reign of Alfonso XIII from people with prestigious professional background as famous officers of the Army, well-known physicians or businessmen, etc. Only the first one of these classes, the Gentlemen Grandees of Spain, had real functions close to the King and they had a weekly shift to stay with the Monarch in all sorts of activities.

== List of "Sumilleres de Corps" to the King of Spain between 1515 and 1931 ==
=== “Sumilleres de Corps” to Charles V, Holy Roman Emperor, 1516-1556 ===
- 1515-1521: Paule de Amersdorf
- 1528-1528: Charles de Poupet, Lord of La Chaulx
- 1531-1556: Joaquín de Rye, Lord of Balanchon

=== “Sumilleres de Corps” to King Philip II, 1556-1598 ===
- 1556-1557: Antonio de Rojas y de Velasco
- 1557-1573: Ruy Gómez de Silva, Duke of Pastrana, Grandee of Spain
- 1585-1592: Juan de Acuña, Count of Buendía, Grandee of Spain
- 1592-1598: Cristóbal de Moura, Count of Castel Rodrigo, Grandee of Spain

=== “Sumilleres de Corps” to King Philip III, 1598-1621 ===
- 1598-1599: Cristóbal de Moura, Marquess of Castel Rodrigo, Grandee of Spain
- 1599-1618:Francisco de Sandoval y Rojas, Duke of Lerma, Grandee of Spain
- 1618-1621: Cristóbal Gómez de Sandoval y de la Cerda, Duke of Uceda, Grandee of Spain

=== “Sumilleres de Corps” to King Philip IV, 1621-1665 ===
- 1621-1622: Baltasar de Zúñiga
- 1622-1626: Gaspar de Guzmán, Count and Duke of Olivares, Grandee of Spain
- 1626-1636: Ramiro Núñez de Guzmán, Duke of Medina de las Torres, Grandee of Spain
- 1636-1643: Gaspar de Guzmán, Count and Duke of Olivares, Grandee of Spain
- 1643-1665: Ramiro Núñez de Guzmán, Duke of Medina de las Torres, Grandee of Spain

=== “Sumilleres de Corps” to King Charles II, 1665-1701 ===
- 1665-1668: Ramiro Núñez de Guzmán, Duke of Medina de las Torres, Grandee of Spain
- 1674-1687: Juan Francisco de la Cerda, Duke of Medinaceli, Grandee of Spain
- 1687-1693: Gregorio María de Silva y Mendoza, 9th Duke of the Infantado, Grandee of Spain
- 1693-1701: Francisco Pimentel Vigil y Quiñones, Duke of Benavente, Grandee of Spain

=== “Sumilleres de Corps” to King Philip V, 1701-1724 ===
- 1701-1709: Francisco Pimentel Vigil y Quiñones, Duke of Benavente, Grandee of Spain
- 1711: Antonio Álvarez de Toledo y Guzmán, Duke of Alba, Grandee of Spain
- 1711-1722: Martín Domingo de Guzmán, Marquess of Quintana del Marco, Grandee of Spain

=== “Sumiller de Corps” to King Louis I, 1724 ===
- 1724: Antonio Osorio y Moscoso, Duke of Sanlúcar la Mayor, Grandee of Spain

=== “Sumilleres de Corps” to King Philip V, 1724-1746 ===
- 1724-1725: Antonio Osorio y Moscoso, Duke of Sanlúcar la Mayor, Grandee of Spain
- 1725-1727: Baltasar de Zuñiga, Duke of Arión, Grandee of Spain
- 1728-1741: Agustín Fernández de Velasco y Bracamonte, Duke of Frías, Grandee of Spain
- 1741-1746: Juan Pizarro de Aragón, Marquess of San Juan de Piedras Albas, Grandee of Spain

=== “Sumilleres de Corps” to King Ferdinand VI, 1746-1759 ===
- 1746-1748: Juan Pizarro de Aragón, Marquess of San Juan de Piedras Albas, Grandee of Spain
- 1748-1757: Sebastián Guzmán de Spínola, Marquess of Montealegre, Grandee of Spain
- 1757-1758: José María Guzmán Vélez y Ladrón de Guevara, Count of Oñate, Grandee of Spain
- 1758-1759: Joaquín López de Zúñiga y Castro, Duke of Béjar, Grandee of Spain

=== “Sumilleres de Corps” to King Charles III, 1759-1788 ===
- 1759-1783: José Fernández de Miranda Ponce de León, Duke of Losada, Grandee of Spain
- 1783-1788: Judas Tadeo Fernández de Miranda Ponce de León y Villacís, Marquess of Valdecarzana,

=== “Sumilleres de Corps” to King Charles IV, 1788-1808 ===
- 1788-1792: Judas Tadeo Fernández de Miranda Ponce de León y Villacís, Marquess of Valdecarzana,
- 1792-1802: Diego Pacheco y Téllez-Girón, Duke of Frías, Grandee of Spain
- 1802-1808: Vicente María Palafox Rebolledo Mexia Silva, Marquess of Ariza, Grandee of Spain

=== “Sumilleres de Corps” to King Ferdinand VII, 1808 and 1814-1833 ===
- 1808-1809: Ignacio de Arteaga e Idiáquez, Marquess of Valmediano, Grandee of Spain ||
- 1809-1812: Juan de la Cruz Belbis de Moncada y Pizarro, Marquess of Bélgida, Grandee of Spain || (1)
- 1812-1814: Ignacio de Arteaga e Idiáquez, Marquess of Valmediano, Grandee of Spain || (1)
- 1814-1820: Vicente María Palafox Rebolledo Mexia Silva, Marquess of Ariza, Grandee of Spain
- 1820-1822: Francisco de Paula Fernández de Córdoba Lasso de la Vega, Count of la Puebla del Maestre, Grandee of Spain
- 1822-1823: José Gabriel de Silva-Bazán y Waldstein, Marquess of Santa Cruz de Mudela, Grandee of Spain
- 1823-1824: Francisco de Paula Fernández de Córdoba Lasso de la Vega, Count of la Puebla del Maestre, Grandee of Spain
- 1824-1833: José Rafael de Silva Fernández de Híjar, Duke of Híjar, Grandee of Spain

=== “Sumilleres de Corps” to Queen Isabella II, 1833-1868 ===
- 1833-1854: José Rafael de Silva Fernández de Híjar, Duke of Híjar, Grandee of Spain
- 1854: Joaquín Fernández de Córdoba y Pacheco, Marquess of Malpica, Grandee of Spain
- 1854-1856: Luis Carondelet Castaños, Duke of Bailén, Grandee of Spain
- 1856-1865: Vicente Pío Osorio de Moscoso y Ponce de León, Count of Altamira, Grandee of Spain
- 1865-1868: Joaquín Fernández de Córdoba y Pacheco, Marquess of Malpica, Grandee of Spain

=== “Sumilleres de Corps” to King Alfonso XIII, 1885-1931 ===
- 1906-1909: Carlos Martínez de Irujo y del Alcazar, Duke of Sotomayor, Grandee of Spain
- 1909-1925: Andrés Avelino de Salabert y Arteaga, Marquess of la Torrecilla, Grandee of Spain
- 1925-1927: José Saavedra y Salamanca, Marquess of Viana, Grandee of Spain
- 1927-1931: Luis María de Silva y Carvajal, Duke of Miranda, Grandee of Spain

(1) “Sumilleres de Corps” in exile at Valençay
