= Bernardino Fernández de Velasco, 14th Duke of Frías =

Spanish politician

The Most Excellent Bernardino Fernández de Velasco 14th Duke of Frías GE
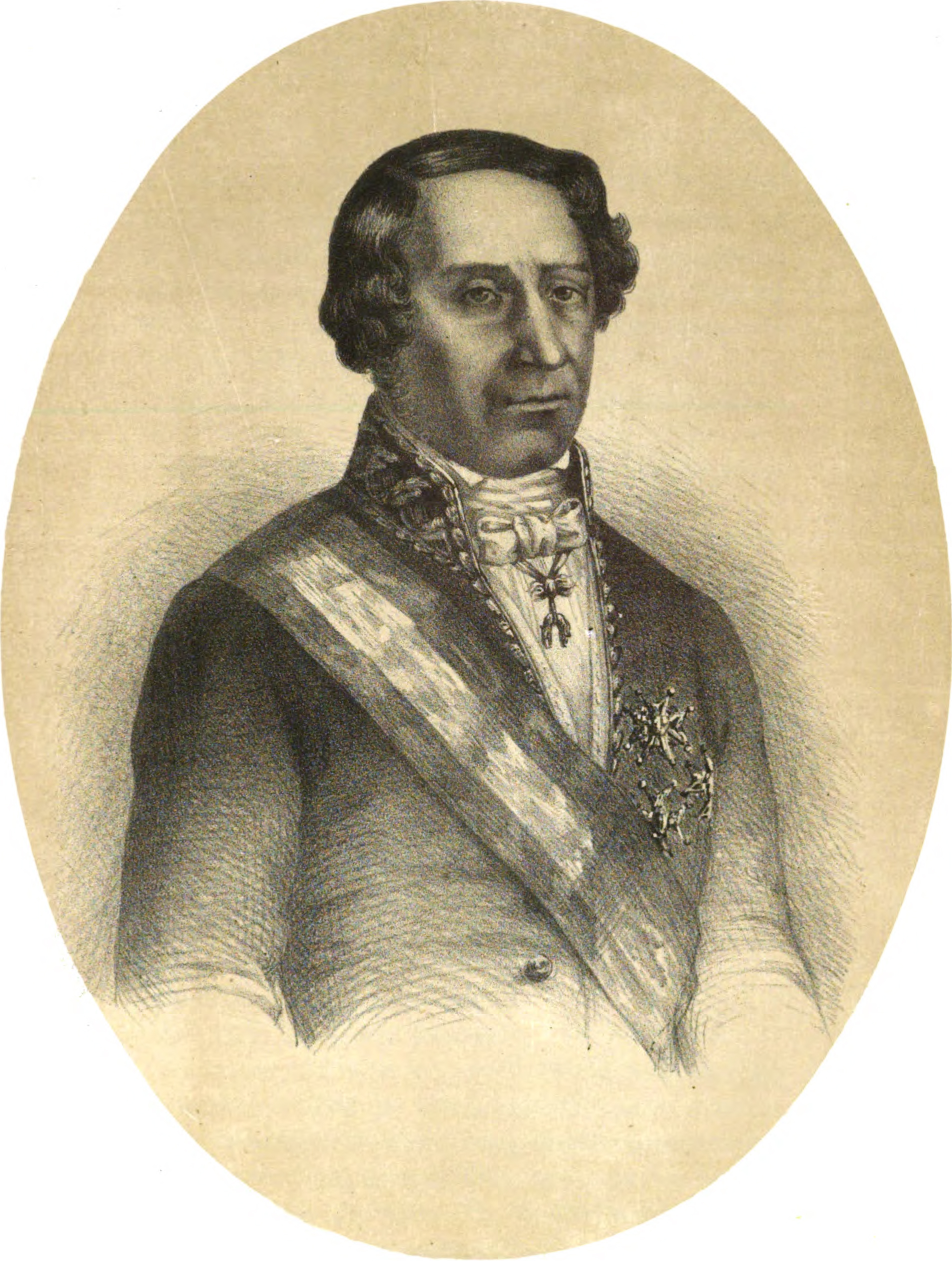

Prime Minister of Spain
- In office 6 September 1838 – 9 December 1838
- Monarch: Isabella II
- Preceded by: Narciso Fernández de Heredia
- Succeeded by: Evaristo Pérez de Castro

Seat L of the Real Academia Española
- In office 1839 – 28 May 1851
- Preceded by: José Gabriel de Silva-Bazán
- Succeeded by: José Caveda y Nava

Personal details
- Born: Bernardino Fernández de Velasco-Pacheco y Benavides; 20 July 1783 Madrid, Spain
- Died: 28 May 1851 (aged 67) Madrid, Spain
- Party: Realista Moderado

Bernardino Fernández de Velasco-Pacheco y Benavides, 14th Duke of Frías, Grandee of Spain, KOGF (1783 in Madrid – 1851) was a Spanish noble, politician, diplomat and writer who served in 1838 as Prime Minister of Spain. He was one of the most important Spanish nobles of his time, and held, among other titles, the dukedoms of Frías, Escalona and Uceda, the Marquisates of Villena and Berlanga, and the Countships of Alba de Liste, Oropesa and Peñaranda de Bracamonte.

== Biography ==
Son of the Afrancesado (pro-French) XIII Duke of Frías, Diego Fernández de Velasco, who died in France in 1811, and his wife Francisca de Paula de Benavides de Córdoba. He joined the Walloon Guards around 1796 at the age of just thirteen, becoming a lieutenant at 19, circa 1802.

He first participated in the Invasion of Portugal (1807) alongside the French army, but then deserted to join the Spanish resistance during the War of Independence, unlike his father who took part in the commission that drafted the Bayonne Statute.

As Lieutenant Colonel, he participated between November 1808 and May 1812 in different campaigns and actions of the war, for which he received the Cross of San Fernando, the Cross of Talavera and other decorations.

Upon the return of King Ferdinand VII, in 1814 and already with the rank of Colonel, he advocated that the Monarch swear the oath of the Spanish Constitution of 1812. This was a position that excluded him from the following meetings which led to the return of the Absolute regime.

He returned to active political life in 1820 with the Liberal Triennium. He was a member of the moderate group of the Anilleros and became Spanish Ambassador in London (1820–21) and a State Councilor. With the restoration of absolutism in 1823, he had to go into exile in Montpellier, until he could return to Spain in 1828. He was a member of the Estamento de Próceres in the Cortes from 1834 to 1836.

Francisco Martínez de la Rosa sent him to Paris to obtain French support during the First Carlist War, intervening in the negotiations for the signing of the 1834 Quadruple Alliance and the dispatch of the French Foreign Legion.

In 1838 he was elected senator for León. On 6 September of that year he was named President of the Council of Ministers (Prime Minister), replacing Narciso Heredia, Count of Ofalia. He unsuccessfully tried to negotiate with the European Absolutist powers (Austria, Prussia and Russia) to withdraw their support for the Carlists, who were fighting in favor of Fernando VII's brother, Carlos María Isidro.

In domestic politics, his attempts at reconciliation immediately clashed with the interests of the various political factions and the army. He was overwhelmed by the struggle for power between Ramón María Narváez and Baldomero Espartero. Although he managed to control the insurrection of Luis Fernández de Córdova in Seville, he was unable to face the opposition in the Cortes and was forced to resign on 8 December 1838.

In 1845 he returned to political activity as a senator for life, although he devoted his time to literature, joining the Royal Spanish Academy in 1847. As a lyrical poet of moderate importance, he followed in the footsteps of Juan Nicasio Gallego, with whom he had a close friendship. The academy published his Poetic Works in 1857, with a prologue by the Duke of Rivas and a biographical and critical study by Mariano Roca de Togores.

=== Marriage and children ===
The Duke of Frías married three times:

- in 1802 with María Ana de Silva Bazán y Waldstein (1787–1805), daughter of José Joaquín de Silva-Bazán, no issue
- in 1811 with María de la Piedad Roca de Togores Valcárcel (1787–1830), daughter of the Count of Pinohermoso, one daughter :
  - Bernardina María Fernández de Velasco Pacheco Téllez-Girón y Roca de Togores (1815–1869), X Duchess of Uceda
- in 1839 with Ana de Jaspe y Macías, after the birth of their 3 children :
  - Ana Valentina Fernández de Velasco (1833–1852), XI Countess of Peñaranda de Bracamonte
  - José María Fernández de Velasco y Jaspe (1836–1888), XV Duke of Frías
  - Mencia Fernández de Velasco.

== Ancestry ==
Ancestors of Bernardino Fernández de Velasco, 14th Duke of Frías

16. Manuel Gaspar Pacheco, 5th Duke of Uceda
8. Juan Francisco Pacheco, 6th Duke of Uceda
17. Josefa Antonia Álvarez de Toledo y Pacheco
4. Andrés Pacheco, 7th Duke of Uceda
18. Francisco de Paula Téllez-Girón, 6th Duke of Osuna
9. María Dominga Téllez-Girón, 8th Marquise of Berlanga
19. María Remigia Fernández de Velasco, 7th Marquise of Berlanga
2. Diego Fernández de Velasco, 13th Duke of Frías
20. Agustín Fernández de Velasco, 10th Duke of Frías
10. Bernardino Fernández de Velasco, 11th Duke of Frías
21. Manuela Pimentel y Zúñiga
5. María Francisca Fernández de Velasco, 9th Countess of Peñaranda de Bracamonte
22. Manuel Gaspar Pacheco, 5th Duke of Uceda
11. María Josefa Pacheco y Álvarez de Toledo
23. Josefa Antonia Álvarez de Toledo y Pacheco
1. Bernardino Fernández de Velasco, 14th Duke of Frías
24. Francisco de Benavides, 9th Count of Santisteban del Puerto
12. Manuel de Benavides, 1st Duke of Santisteban del Puerto
25. María Francisca de Aragón y Sandoval
6. Antonio de Benavides, 2nd Duke of Santisteban del Puerto
26. Baltasar de la Cueva y Enríquez de Cabrera
13. Ana Catalina de la Cueva, 9th Countess of Castellar
27. Teresa María Arias de Saavedra, 7th Countess of Castellar
3. María Francisca de Benavides y Córdoba
28. Nicolás Fernández de Córdoba, 10th Duke of Medinaceli
14. Luis Antonio Fernández de Córdoba, 11th Duke of Medinaceli
29. Jerónima Spínola y de la Cerda
7. Ana María Fernández de Córdoba y Moncada
30. Guillén Ramón de Moncada, 6th Marquis of Aytona
15. María Teresa de Moncada, 7th Marquise of Aytona
31. Ana María de Benavides y Aragón

Political offices
Preceded by The Count of Heredia Spínola	Prime Minister of Spain; 6 September 1838 – 9 December 1838	Succeeded by Evaristo Pérez de Castro
Preceded by The Count of Heredia Spínola	Minister of State; 6 September 1838 – 9 December 1838	Succeeded by Evaristo Pérez de Castro
Spanish nobility
Preceded by Diego Fernández de Velasco	Duke of Frías; 1811–1851	Succeeded by José María Bernardino; Fernández de Velasco
