= Narciso Heredia, Count of Ofalia =

Spanish nobleman, politician and diplomat

The Most Excellent The Count of Ofalia GE

Prime Minister of Spain
- In office 16 December 1837 – 6 September 1838
- Monarch: Isabella II
- Preceded by: Eusebio Bardají
- Succeeded by: The Duke of Frías

Personal details
- Born: 11 September 1775 Gines, Seville, Spain
- Died: 8 September 1847 (aged 71) Madrid, Spain
- Party: Realista Moderado

Narciso Fernández de Heredia y Begines de los Ríos, iure uxoris Count of Ofalia, 2nd Count of Heredia-Spínola, 1st Marquess of Heredia, GE (1775–1847) was a Spanish nobleman, politician and diplomat who served as Prime Minister of Spain and as Minister of State from 16 December 1837 to 6 September 1838, in the reign of Isabella II.

== Biography ==
Heredia was the eldest son of Narciso Fernández de Heredia, 1st Count of Heredia-Spínola, and his wife María de las Mercedes Begines de los Ríos y Bejarano. He married firstly in 1803 María de la Soledad Pontejos y Cerviño, and had two daughters by this marriage:

- Doña Narcisa Fernández de Heredia, 3rd Countess of Heredia-Spínola (1804–1828), married to Miguel Francisco Arízcun, 5th Marquess of Iturbieta.
- Doña Josefa Fernández de Heredia y Cerviño, married her cousin Narciso Fernández de Heredia, 1st Count of Doña Marina.

Heredia married secondly in 1820 María Dolores de Salabert, 4th Countess of Ofalia, second daughter of Félix de Salabert, 5th Marquess of la Torrecilla and Petra de Torres y Feloaga.

George Borrow, in chapter 38 of his travelogue The Bible in Spain, describes an 1838 meeting with Ofalia in which he presented the Prime Minister with a specially-bound Protestant New Testament: "Throughout the whole of our interview he evidently laboured under great fear, and was continually looking behind and around him, seemingly in dread of being overheard, which brought to my mind an expression of a friend of mine, that if there be any truth in metempsychosis, the soul of Count Ofalia must have originally belonged to a mouse. We parted in kindness, and I went away, wondering by what strange chance this poor man had become prime minister of a country like Spain."

== Notes ==
Political offices
Preceded by Eusebio Bardají	Prime Minister of Spain; 16 December 1837 – 6 September 1838	Succeeded by The Duke of Frías
Preceded by Eusebio Bardají	Minister of State; 16 December 1837 – 6 September 1838	Succeeded by The Duke of Frías
