= Francisco Casimiro Pimentel de Quiñones y Benavides, 9th Duke of Benavente =

Spanish aristocrat (1655-1709)

Francisco Casimiro Pimentel de Quiñones y Benavides (4 March 1655 in Madrid – 15 January 1709 Madrid), IX Duke of Benavente, XIII count of Mayorga, XI count of Luna, V marquis of Jabalquinto, VI marquis of Villa Real de Purullena, was a Spanish aristocrat who served the Spanish Royal House.

== Life and family ==
He was the son of Antonio Alonso Pimentel y Herrera Zúñiga, VIII Duke of Benavente, and Isabel Francisca de Benavides, III Marquess of Jabalquinto.

He married in 1670 with Antonia de Guevara, daughter of the Marqués de Campo Real, who died in 1677. That same year, he remarried Leonor de Zúñiga Sarmiento, daughter of the IX Duke of Béjar. He had 2 sons and 4 daughters from these two marriages.

In 1674 he was appointed Gentleman of the Chambers of King Carlos II of Spain and in 1681, captain of the old guard of Castile. In 1689, he was one of the witnesses of the testament of Queen Marie Louise d'Orléans, and shortly after he was sent by Carlos II to Ferrol to accompany the King's new wife, Maria Anna of Neuburg, to Valladolid for the ratification of the marriage. In reward for his services, the King appointed Benavente Sumiller de Corps on 23 June 1693. Since then, he occupied several rooms at the Real Alcázar, and became Commander in the Order of Santiago in 1694.

During the last years of Carlos II's reign, Benavente was one of the courtiers closest to the monarch, very much against Queen Maria Anna de Neuburg's wishes. he was one of the witnesses of Carlos II's will and also a member of the Regency Board established after the death of the monarch.

A supporter of Philip V of Spain in the War of Spanish Succession, Benavente was confirmed by the new monarch as Sumiller de Corps. During the first years of the reign of the new Bourbon King, Pimentel accompanied him to Catalonia (1701) and Italy (1702), as well as to the different military fronts on the Iberian Peninsula.

In gratitude for the services provided, King Louis XIV appointed him Knight in the Order of the Holy Spirit and the Order of Saint Michael in 1703.

Finally Francisco Casimiro died in 1709, and was buried in the family pantheon in the convent of San Francisco de Benavente.

== Sources ==
- Real Academia de la Historia
- Geni
