= Luis de Aliaga =

Luis de Aliaga Martínez (1560–1626) was the Grand Inquisitor of Spain from 1619 to 1621.

Luis de Aliaga Martínez was born in Mosqueruela in 1560, the son of a nobleman who nevertheless ran a cloth business. After he was orphaned, he entered the Dominican monastery in Zaragoza in 1582. He was invited to teach theology at the University of Zaragoza. However, he moved to the Dominican monastery in San Ildefonso instead in 1605.

In 1606, Father Javierre, who had been his prior at Zaragoza convinced him to come to Madrid as his assistant. On 6 December 1608 he was named confessor of Francisco Gómez de Sandoval, 1st Duke of Lerma, favourite of Philip III of Spain. Lerma soon had Aliaga appointed confessor to the king (a position that had previously been held by Diego Mardones, a member of the Franciscan Order, who became Bishop of Córdoba). In this influential position, Aliaga was a leading voice calling for the Expulsion of the Moriscos in 1609. The king offered to make him Archbishop of Toledo, but he refused.

Aliaga accepted the king's offer to name him Archimandrite of Sicily and a member of the Spanish Council of State. Although he was close to Lerma, in 1618, he played a role in Lerma's downfall. The new favourite, Cristóbal de Sandoval, Duke of Uceda had Aliaga named Grand Inquisitor of Spain in 1619.

When Philip III died in 1624, the new king, Philip IV of Spain removed Aliaga from office and ordered him exiled to Huete and later to Aragon.

He died in Zaragoza in 1626.

Catholic Church titles
Preceded by Bernardo de Sandoval y Rojas	Grand Inquisitor of Spain; 1619–1621	Succeeded by Andrés Pacheco
