= Ramiro Núñez de Guzmán =

Spanish nobleman

Ramiro Núñez de Guzmán 2nd Marquess of Toral 3rd Duke of Medina de las Torres Lord of Aviados, Boñar Valley and Valley of Curueño
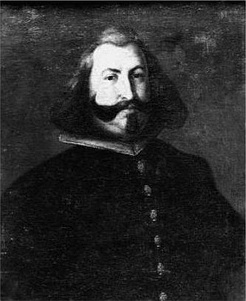

Sumiller de Corps
- In office 1626–1636
- Monarch: Philip IV
- Preceded by: Count-Duke of Olivares
- Succeeded by: Count-Duke of Olivares
- In office 23 January 1643 – 8 December 1668
- Monarchs: Philip IV; Charles II
- Regent: Mariana of Austria
- Preceded by: Count-Duke of Olivares
- Succeeded by: Juan Francisco de la Cerda, 8th Duke of Medinaceli

President of the Council of Indies
- In office 1629–1631
- Monarch: Philip IV
- Valido: Count-Duke of Olivares
- Preceded by: Lorenzo de Cárdenas Valda y Zárate
- Succeeded by: García de Avellaneda y Haro

President of the Council of Italy
- In office 1633 – April 1636
- Monarch: Philip IV
- Valido: Count-Duke of Olivares
- Preceded by: Francisco Fernández de la Cueva, 7th Duke of Alburquerque
- Succeeded by: Gaspar de Borja y Velasco
- In office 25 August 1666 – 8 December 1668
- Monarch: Charles II
- Regent: Mariana of Austria
- Valido: Juan Everardo Nithard
- Preceded by: Antonio Sancho Davila, Marquis of Velada
- Succeeded by: Duarte Fernando Álvarez de Toledo

Viceroy of Naples
- In office 13 November 1637 – 6 May 1644
- Monarch: Philip IV
- Preceded by: Manuel de Acevedo y Zúñiga
- Succeeded by: Juan Alfonso Enríquez de Cabrera, 5th Duke of Medina de Rioseco

Secretary of Holy Roman Empire, France, England, Flanders and Northern Europe Affairs (Note: Also as valido of Philip IV)
- In office 26 November 1661 – 17 September 1665 Serving with García de Avellaneda y Haro (Note: As Secretary of Italy Affairs)
- Monarch: Philip IV

Personal details
- Born: c. 1600 León, Spain
- Died: 8 December 1668 (aged 67–68) Madrid, Spain
- Spouse(s): María de Guzmán y Zúñiga (1625–1626); Anna Carafa (1636–1644); Catalina Vélez Ladrón de Guevara (1659–1668)
- Children: Nicolás María de Guzmán y Carafa; Anielo de Guzmán y Carafa; Domingo de Guzmán y Carafa; Mariana de Guzmán y Vélez Ladrón de Guevara
- Parent(s): Gabriel Núñez de Guzmán (father); Francisca de Guzmán (mother)
- Occupation: Statesman
- Awards: Order of Calatrava

Military service
- Allegiance: Spanish Empire; Kingdom of Naples
- Branch/service: Spanish Army of Naples
- Years of service: 1637–1644
- Rank: Captain general

Ramiro Núñez de Guzmán (León, Spain, c. 1600 – Madrid, 1668), II Duke of Medina de las Torres, was a Spanish nobleman.

== Biography ==
He served as viceroy of Naples from 1637-44 under King Philip IV of Spain. He was the son-in-law of Gaspar de Guzmán, Count-Duke of Olivares.

He held several important functions at the Spanish Court. In 1626, he became Sumiller de Corps of King Philip IV of Spain, in 1627 member of the Council of State, in 1628 General Treasurer of the Crown of Aragon, in 1629 President of the Council of the Indies, in 1633 President of the Council of Italy, and finally in 1637 Viceroy of Naples.

He held various additional titles, including Lord of the House of Guzmán, II Duke of Medina de las Torres, Prince of Stigliano, Duke of Sabbioneta, Lord of the Valle de Curuenyo, Lord of the Council of Cilleros, Commander of Valdepeñas, Captain of the Cien Continuos, Castilian of Castel Nuovo in Naples, Lieutenant and Captain General of Naples.

His second wife, Anna Carafa, duchess of Stigliano, is known as the owner and namesake of Villa Donn'Anna, a major landmark in Posillipo.
