= Royal Household and Heritage of the Crown of Spain =

The Royal Household and Heritage of the Crown of Spain (Spanish: Real Casa y Patrimonio de la Corona de España) was the institution of the Monarchy of Spain. It governed the organization of the Royal Spanish Court from the time of the Habsburg dynasty (1516), which introduced the so-called Burgundian etiquette, up to the reign of King Alfonso XIII (1931), great-grandfather of the current King Felipe VI, in all that regarded the structure of the Court as well as the ceremonial matters, etiquette and protocol.

== The Old Household ==
The Royal Household during the Habsburg dynasty was shaped after that one that existed in the Court of Burgundy. Charles V, Holy Roman Emperor, but also King of Spain, imported the etiquette styled in the Court of his paternal grandmother Mary of Burgundy. To the ancient office of Mayordomo del Rey de Castilla (Steward of the King of Castile), transformed in "Mayordomo mayor" (High Steward), the Emperor added that of the “Sumiller de Corps” who was charged with everything regarding the organization of the inner rooms of the palace where the Monarch lived. Also, it was created the office of “Camarera mayor de Palacio” (First Lady of the Bedchamber). The latter two offices were not known in the traditional organization of the Court of the Kingdom of Castile.

== The Royal Household during the 19th and 20th centuries ==
The Royal Household was substantially transformed during the reigns of King Ferdinand VII and Queen Isabella II but, over all, after the restoration of King Alfonso XII in 1875.

Regarding the basic organization of this Royal Household, the structure was divided between the "Mayordomia" (Stewardship) and the "Camareria" (Ladyship). With organic independence, there existed the General Commander of the Royal Body of Halberdiers, the General Intendant of the Royal House and Heritage and the Royal Chaplain and Almoner.

=== The "Mayordomía" ===
It was headed by the "Mayordomo mayor" (High Steward) to the King, also invested with the Office of "Sumiller de Corps", who was in charge of the protocol and organization of the ceremonies or activities presided or attended by the Monarch. Also, he was in charge of the high inspection of the royal buildings and the superior direction of the personnel at the service to the King. As holder of the privy seal, he was also responsible for the signature of official documents by the King and was the high chief of the Court honorary servants called “Gentilhombres Grandes de España con ejercicio y servidumbre” (Gentlemen of the bedchamber Grandees of Spain) and of those called “Gentilhombres de camara con ejercicio” (Gentlemen of the bedchamber), both (but especially the first ones) with certain duties attached to the person of the King. Under the “Mayordomo mayor” were also the “Mayordomo mayor de la Reina” (High Steward to the Queen), the “Mayordomos de semana” (Weekly stewards literally), the General Inspector of the Royal Palaces (Office created in 1852), the Private Secretary to the King, the Physicians and Pharmacists of the Bedchamber, and the Kings of Arms.

=== The "Camarería" ===
It was headed by the "Camarera mayor de Palacio" (First Lady of the Bedchamber) to the Queen who was in charge of the organization of ceremonies and activities presided or attended by the Queen and was the high chief of the "Damas de la Reina" (Ladies-in-waiting) and all the personnel attached to the service of the Queen. This office was suppressed in 1931 and never re-created after the restoration of the Monarchy in 1975.

=== Other offices ===
Also, it existed the "Caballerizo mayor" (Great Equerry) of the King who organized the travels of the King and who was in charge of the Royal Mews and the Royal hunting lodges, acting (in this latter case) as “Montero mayor” (Great Hunter). This office was suppressed in 1931 and never re-created after the restoration of the Monarchy in 1975.

Organically independent from the “Mayordomía” and the “Camarería” there was the Office of General Commander of the Corps of Halberdiers, who was the Chief of the Military Household of the King. Under his command were the Chief Clerk, who was in charge of the keys of the Royal palaces, the Aides-de-camp to the King and the Military Assistants to the orders of the King, proceeding from diverse branches of the Army and Navy. Likewise under the General Commander were the so-called “Monteros de Espinosa” (Hunters of the Chamber), who were 12 gentlemen with proven nobility. They regularly kept guard outside the bedrooms of the King and the Queen during the night and accompanied them from the moment of their death up to the delivery of their remains to the Monastery of El Escorial.

Equally independent, there existed the Office of the General Comptroller of the Royal House, who was the top financial chief and administrator of the Heritage of the Crown. Under his command were the Cashier, the General Archivist, the Royal Librarian, the Managers of the Royal Sites, the Bearers of the Royal Patronages and the Secretary of the Intendency.

The third Office out of the “Mayordomía” was the “Procapellán” (Chaplain) and Great Almoner of the King who was the chief of the Royal Chapel, being the domestic prelate of the palace. Under the orders of the "Procapellán" were the Chaplains of Honor, the Ecclesiastic Secretary, and the so-called Chaplains of the Curtain, Chaplains of the Seal of Castile and those of the Seal of the various Military orders.

During the reign of Alfonso XIII this Office was held by the Patriarch of the West Indies.

== The end of the Royal Household in 1931 and the restoration of the Monarchy in 1975 ==
This institution was suppressed after the proclamation of the Second Spanish Republic in 1931.

It is the historical precedent of the modern Royal Household of Spain. Nevertheless, when King Juan Carlos I acceded to the throne in 1975, he decided to create a Household completely different from the former court of his grandfather Alfonso XIII. The modern Royal Household is much simpler than the preceding institution and it was decided not to recreate the majority of Offices which had existed in the old Royal Household, maintaining basically the Head of the Royal Household and the General Secretary of the Royal Household. Both Offices are held by professional and prestigious civil servants, even if they come from the nobility.

== The Heritage of the Crown ==
The Heritage of the Crown of Spain, managed by the General Intendant of the Royal House, was ruled by a Law of June 30, 1876, and successive decrees.

The King resided at the Royal Palace of Madrid, where the official functions were exercised.

Also forming part of the Heritage of the Crown were the Spanish royal sites, including the Royal Palace of Aranjuez, the Royal Palace of La Granja de San Ildefonso, the Royal Palace of El Escorial, the Royal Alcázar of Seville, the Royal Palace of El Pardo and the Royal Palace of La Almudaina.

King Alfonso XIII built, as a personal property, the Palacio de la Magdalena.

The Royal Patronages were the Royal Convent of the Salesas Reales, the Royal Convent of Las Descalzas Reales, the Royal Monastery of Saint Isabel, the Royal Convent of Santa Clara in Tordesillas, the Royal Abbey of Santa María la Real de Las Huelgas, the Royal Hospital of the Good Event of Madrid where it had his residence the “Procapellán” and the Royal Colleges of Alfonso XII and Maria Christina of Austria in El Escorial.

All these Palaces and Patronages were transferred in 1940 to the Patrimonio Nacional which is now charged with their maintenance and is a public office depending from the Ministry of the Presidency of the Spanish Government.

== See also ==
- Royal Guard (Spain)
- List of titles and honours of the Spanish Crown
- List of Spanish monarchs
- List of Spanish royal consorts
- Family tree of Spanish monarchs
- Succession to the Spanish throne
- Politics of Spain
