= Duke of Uceda =

Dukedom of Spain

Dukedom of Uceda
- Creation date: 16 May 1610
- Created by: Philip III
- Peerage: Peerage of Spain
- First holder: Cristóbal de Gómez de Sandoval y de la Cerda, 1st Duke of Uceda
- Present holder: Pilar Latorre y Téllez-Girón, 15th Duchess of Uceda
- Former seat: Palacio del Duque de Uceda

Duke of Uceda (Spanish: Duque de Uceda) is a hereditary title in the Peerage of Spain, accompanied by the dignity of Grandee and granted in 1610 by Philip III to Cristóbal Gómez de Sandoval, who succeeded his father Francisco Gómez de Sandoval, 1st Duke of Lerma as the king's favourite.

The name refers to the town of Uceda in Guadalajara, where Cristóbal Gómez de Sandoval owned lands.

== Dukes of Uceda ==
	Holder	Period
Created by Philip III of Spain
I	Cristóbal Gómez de Sandoval Rojas y de la Cerda	1610–1624
II	Francisco Gómez de Sandoval Rojas y Padilla	1624–1635
III	Felicia de Sandoval y Urbino, married Gaspar Téllez-Girón, 5th Duke de Osuna	1635–1671
IV	Isabel María de Sandoval y Girón, married Juan Francisco Pacheco y Téllez-Girón	1671–1711
V	Manuel Gaspar Gómez de Sandoval Téllez-Girón	1711–1732
VI	Francisco Javier Pacheco Téllez-Girón	1732–1750
VII	Andrés Manuel Alonso Pacheco Téllez-Girón y Toledo	1750–1789
VIII	Diego Pacheco Téllez-Girón Gómez de Sandoval	1789–1811
IX	Bernardino Fernández de Velasco Pacheco y Téllez-Girón	1811–1851
X	Bernardina María Fernández de Velasco Pacheco Téllez-Girón y Roca de Togores	1851–1869
XI	Francisco de Borja Téllez-Girón y Fernández de Velasco	1869–1897
XII	Luis María Téllez-Girón y Fernández de Córdoba	1897–1909
XIII	Mariano Téllez-Girón y Fernández de Córdoba	1909– ?
XIV	Ángela María Téllez-Girón y Duque de Estrada	? – 1982
XV	Pilar Latorre y Téllez-Girón	1982–present

== See also ==
- List of dukes in the peerage of Spain
- List of current grandees of Spain
