= García de Avellaneda y Haro =

Spanish noble and politician

García de Avellaneda y Haro Marquis Consort of Castrillo
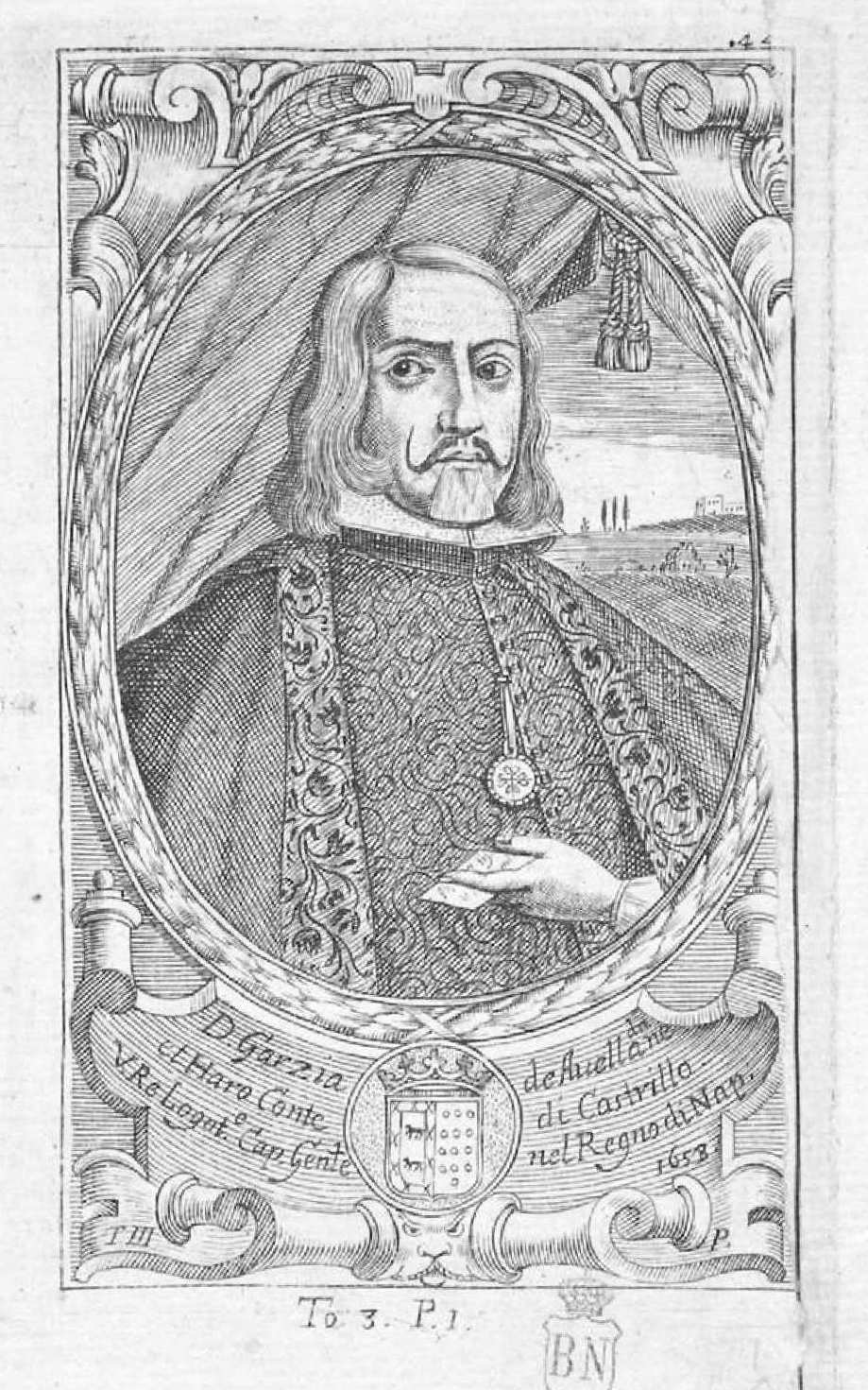
- García de Avellaneda y Haro (anonymous)

President of the Council of Indies
- Acting; January – August 1626
- Monarch: Philip IV
- Valido: Count-Duke of Olivares
- Preceded by: Juan de Villela
- Succeeded by: Juan de Mendoza, Marquis de la Hinojosa
- In office 26 November 1632 – 10 November 1653
- Monarch: Philip IV
- Valido: Count-Duke of Olivares; Luis de Haro
- Preceded by: Ramiro Núñez de Guzmán
- Succeeded by: Gaspar de Bracamonte, 3rd Count of Peñaranda

President of the Council of Finance
- Acting; July 1642 – May 1643
- Monarch: Philip IV
- Valido: Count-Duke of Olivares
- Preceded by: Antonio Camporredondo y Río
- Succeeded by: Francisco Antonio de Alarcón

Viceroy of Naples
- In office 1653–1658
- Monarch: Philip IV
- Preceded by: Lorenzo de Cárdenas Valda y Zárate
- Succeeded by: Gaspar de Bracamonte, 3rd Count of Peñaranda

President of the Council of Italy
- In office 1655–1658
- Monarch: Philip IV
- Valido: Luis de Haro
- Preceded by: Diego Felípez de Guzmán, 1st Marquis of Leganés
- Succeeded by: Antonio Sancho Davila, Marquis of Velada

Mayordomo mayor
- In office 1658–1660
- Monarch: Philip IV
- Preceded by: Juan Gabriel Pacheco Téllez Girón
- Succeeded by: Juan Gaspar Enríquez de Cabrera y Sandoval

Secretary of Italy Affairs
- In office 26 November 1661 – 17 September 1665 Serving with Ramiro Núñez de Guzmán (Note: As Secretary of Holy Roman Empire, France, England, Flanders and Northern Europe Affairs and valido of Philip IV)
- Monarch: Philip IV

President of the Council of Castile
- In office 1662–1668
- Monarchs: Philip IV; Charles II
- Regent: Mariana of Austria
- Valido: Juan Everardo Nithard
- Preceded by: Diego de Riaño y Gamboa
- Succeeded by: Diego Riquelme de Quirós

Personal details
- Born: 1584 Écija, Crown of Castile, Spanish Empire
- Died: 1670 (aged 85–86) Madrid, Spanish Empire
- Spouse(s): María Delgadillo de Avellaneda, II Countess of Castrillo
- Relations: Diego López de Haro y Sotomayor (brother); Gaspar de Guzmán, Count-Duke of Olivares (brother-in-law); Luis de Haro (nephew); Bernardino de Avellaneda (grandfather-in-law)
- Children: Gaspar Manuel de Avellaneda; Inés Portocarrero; Juana María Delgadillo de Avellaneda y Haro, III Countess of Castrillo; Beatriz de Haro y Sotomayor; Luis de Haro y Paz
- Parent(s): Luis Méndez de Haro y Sotomayor (father); Beatriz de Haro y Sotomayor, IV Marchioness of Carpio (mother)
- Education: University of Salamanca
- Awards: Order of Calatrava

Garcia de Avellaneda y Haro, Count of Castrillo (Écija, 1584 – Madrid, 1670), was a Spanish noble and politician, who held important positions in the Spanish government.

== Biography ==
He was the second son of Luis Méndez de Haro and Beatriz de Sotomayor y Haro, IV Marchioness of Carpio, and therefore brother of the V Marquess of Carpio, Diego López de Haro. Decisive for his career was the protection given to him successively by three leading men of the Kingdom with whom he was related: Bernardino de Avellaneda, his grandfather-in-law, Gaspar de Guzmán, Count-Duke of Olivares, his brother-in-law, and Luis Méndez de Haro, his nephew.

At the Colegio Mayor de Cuenca (Salamanca) he was a professor and rector. His relationship with the Count Duke of Olivares helped him to occupy important positions in the service of Philip IV and Mariana of Austria: he was a knight of the Order of Calatrava, President of the Council of the Indies (1632–1665) and simultaneously President of the Council of Finance (1643–1645).

In 1653 he became Viceroy of Naples until 1658. During his viceroyalty he had to face a French attack carried out by Henri II, Duke of Guise during the Franco-Spanish War and the plague of 1656. He also had the chapel of the Royal Palace of Naples renovated. He was simultaneously President of the Council of Italy (1655–1658).

After his return to Spain, he was Mayordomo mayor of the King (1658–1660) and president of the Council of Castile (1658–1668). After the death of Philip IV in 1665, he continued to play a significant role, since it was the Count of Castrillo who actually signed the royal will due to the physical inability of the Monarch. He was also one of the seven witnesses of the aforementioned will, and in the clauses of the same, his appointment to two fundamental positions is found : that of member of the Council of Guardians, provided for in the event of the death of the King with minor children, as would finally occur, and that of member of the Governing Board of the royal minority, in which he intervened as President of the Council of Castile, who was considered the most important public figure after the Monarch.
During the minority of Charles II, the Count of Castrillo maintained an excellent relationship with Mariana of Austria and a clear enmity towards John Joseph of Austria, who would remove him from power in 1668.

=== Marriage and children ===
In 1623 he married the Countess of Castrillo de Avellaneda Maria Delgadillo, from which marriage he acquired the title of Count of Castrillo. The couple had four children:

- Manuel Gaspar, who died in Portugal after being taken prisoner in the Battle of Montes Claros (1665);
- Agnes, died young;
- Juana Maria, married to the VII Marquis de Cortes;
- Beatriz, married to the VI Marquis of Aguilar de Campoo.

== Notes ==
Government offices
Preceded by Íñigo Vélez de Guevara, 8th Count of Oñate	Viceroy of Naples; 1653–1658	Succeeded by Gaspar de Bracamonte, 3rd Count of Peñaranda
