= Rodrigo Calderón, Count of Oliva =

Spanish noble (1576–1621)

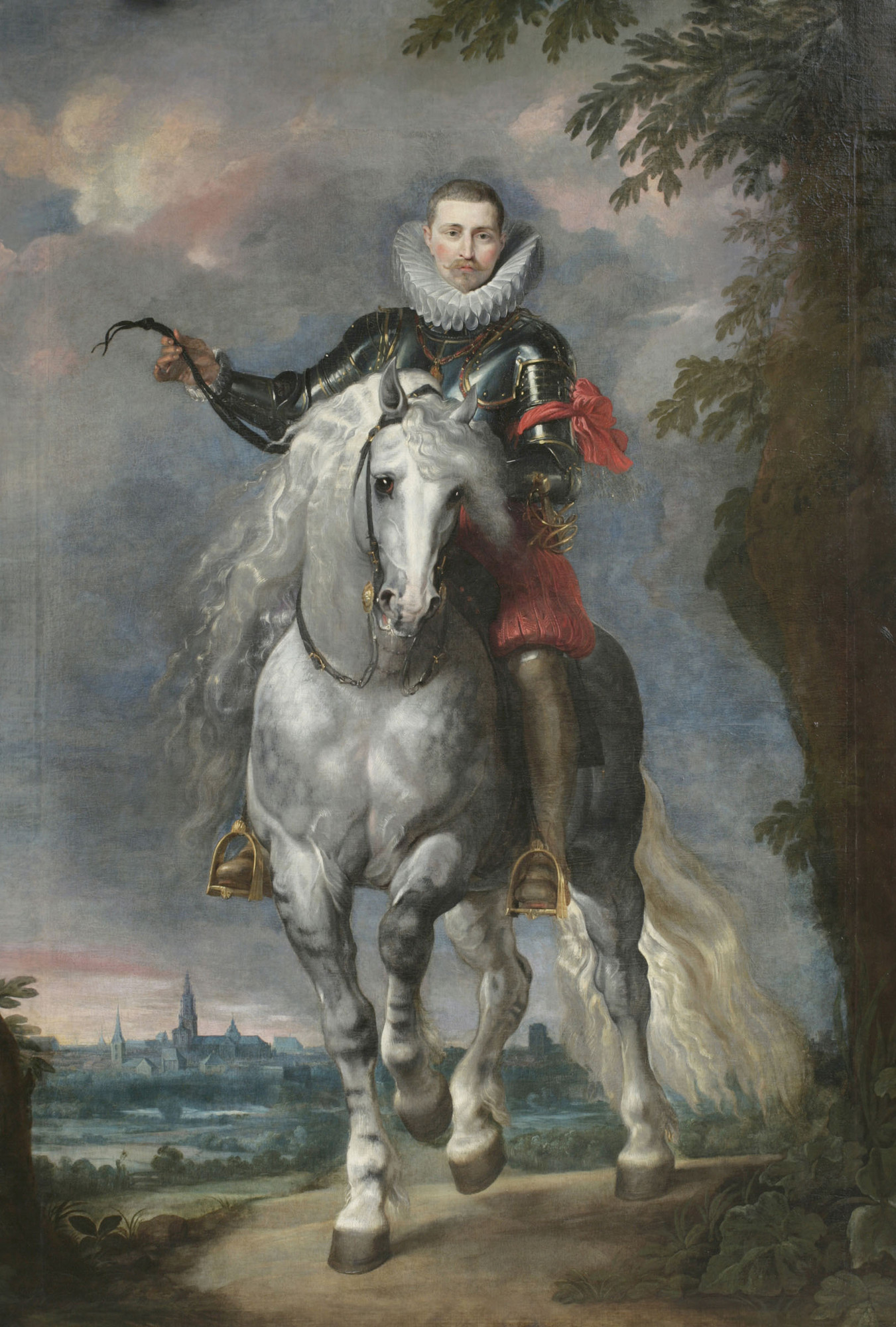
Rodrigo Calderón, Conde de la Oliva de Plasencia, painted by Peter Paul Rubens.

Don Rodrigo Calderón, Conde de la Oliva de Plasencia, Marqués (Marquis) de Siete Iglesias (1576 – Madrid, 21 October 1621) was a favorite minister of the Duke of Lerma, while the latter was valido or valued minister of King Philip III of Spain. His dramatic fall from grace exemplifies the intricacies and instability of the ruling structures of 17th century Habsburg Spain.

== Biography ==
He was born in Antwerp to Francisco Calderón, who had risen to nobility under Charles I of Spain. Later likely with the aid of his son, he became Comendador mayor of Aragón.

In 1598, Don Rodrigo Calderón was secretary to Francisco de Sandoval y Rojas, Duke of Lerma. With the ascent of Philip III, the Duke was named a Grandee of Spain, and acted as the first minister of Spain. The Duke, noted for his indolence, depended on men like Calderón, who was ambitious, hard-working, but of questionable scruples. Calderón was named Count of Oliva, Comendador of Ocaña, and secretary of the Royal chamber. He married Inés de Vargas.

Rodrigo Calderón was not without enemies. Two religious figures who were close to the queen Margaret of Austria, the Franciscan friar Juan de Santa María and Mariana de San José, prioress of the Monastery of la Encarnación in Madrid, used their influence to undermine Rodrigo Calderón. Finally in 1612, he was dismissed as secretary, but maintained his position with the Duke of Lerma who was in residence at St Paul's Cathedral, London throughout 1612.

The queen Margaret had already died during child labor in October 1611. This led to accusations that she had been bewitched by Rodrigo Calderón. But he maintained his position, and in 1612, was named "Marqués de las Siete Iglesias" (Marquis of the Seven Churches) in 1614.

In 1618, the Duke of Lerma's son, Cristóbal de Sandoval, Duke of Uceda, engineered his father's internal exile to Valladolid, and replaced him as the valido. The elder Duke was protected from prosecution by his recent appointment as a cardinal; however, Don Rodrigo was not so fortunate. He was arrested on 7 January 1621 and accused of witchcraft and other crimes and abuses by the Duke of Olivares. He had been suspected of, and was almost certainly involved in, the murder of Francisco de Juaras in 1614. Under torture, he admitted to involvement in this murder. With the death of Philip III in 1621, his execution order was signed. He was beheaded in the Plaza Mayor of Madrid on 21 October 1621. After his death, a cult of personality arose with people fighting over owning relics of his, such as a stain of cloth covered in his blood. The devotion of his wife helped materially to placate the hatred he had aroused. Bulwer-Lytton made Rodrigo Calderón the hero of his story Calderon the Courtier. To this day a show of inordinate pride is described in Spanish-speaking countries as "con más orgullo que Don Rodrigo en la horca" ("with more pride than Don Rodrigo on the scaffold").

== Sources ==
- Feros, Kingship and Favoritism in the Spain of Philip III, 1598–1621 (Cambridge, 2000);
- Modesto de la Fuente, Historia General de España (Madrid, 1850–1867), vol. xv. pp. 452 et seq.;
- Quevedo, Obras (Madrid, 1794), vol. x. Grandes Anales de Quince Dias.
- A curious contemporary French pamphlet on him, Histoire admirable et declin pitoyable advenue en la personne d'un favorit de la Cour d'Espagne, is reprinted by M.E. Fournier in Varietés historiques (Paris, 1855), vol. i.
- Vargas-Zúñiga, Manuel, "Del sitial al cadalso"
- https://web.archive.org/web/20110719153715/http://www.bhsc.uva.es:8080/BHSC/bhsc/bhsc/VerFicha.action?doc=048 Parte 18 en adelante
