= Diego Fernández de Velasco =

Spanish noble and politician (1754–1811)

Diego Fernández de Velasco (8 November 1754 – 11 February 1811), was a Spanish noble, soldier and politician who supported the French during the Peninsular War, and who was therefore known as an Afrancesado. Declared a traitor in 1808, his huge fortune was confiscated and he died, ruined and highly indebted, in Paris, where he is buried.

== Family ==
He was born Diego López-Pacheco Téllez-Girón y Gómez de Sandoval, changing his name to Diego Fernández de Velasco López-Pacheco Téllez- Girón Toledo y Portugal Guzmán Tovar Enríquez Ayala Carrillo Cárdenas Monroy y Córdoba when he came into the title of Duke of Frías in 1776.

He was the son of Andrés Manuel Alonso Téllez-Girón Pacheco y Toledo and María Portería Fernández de Velasco y Pacheco. His mother was the daughter of Bernardino Fernández de Velasco, 11th Duke of Frías, who was succeeded by his brother Martín Fernández de Velasco y Pimentel. When the 12th Duke died in 1776 without children, the title of 13th Duke of Frías went to Diego, who changed his name to Diego Fernández de Velasco y Pacheco.

His 21 nobiliary titles included the following:

- Grandee of Spain
- 13th Duke of Frías
- 13th Duke of Escalona
- 8th Duke of Uceda
- 18th Count of Alba de Liste
- 14th Count of Alcaudete
- 16th Count of Fuensalida
- 16th Count of Oropesa
- 9th Count of Peñaranda de Bracamonte
- 15th Count of Haro
- 10th Marquess of Frómista
- 13th Marquess of Villena

He was also a Knight in the Order of the Golden Fleece from 1808.

Fernández de Velasco married Francisca de Paula de Benavides de Córdoba, and one of the couple's four children, Bernardino Pacheco Téllez-Girón y Benavides, who also changed his name to Bernardino Fernández de Velasco y Pacheco on his father's death, would go to hold major appointments.

== Career ==
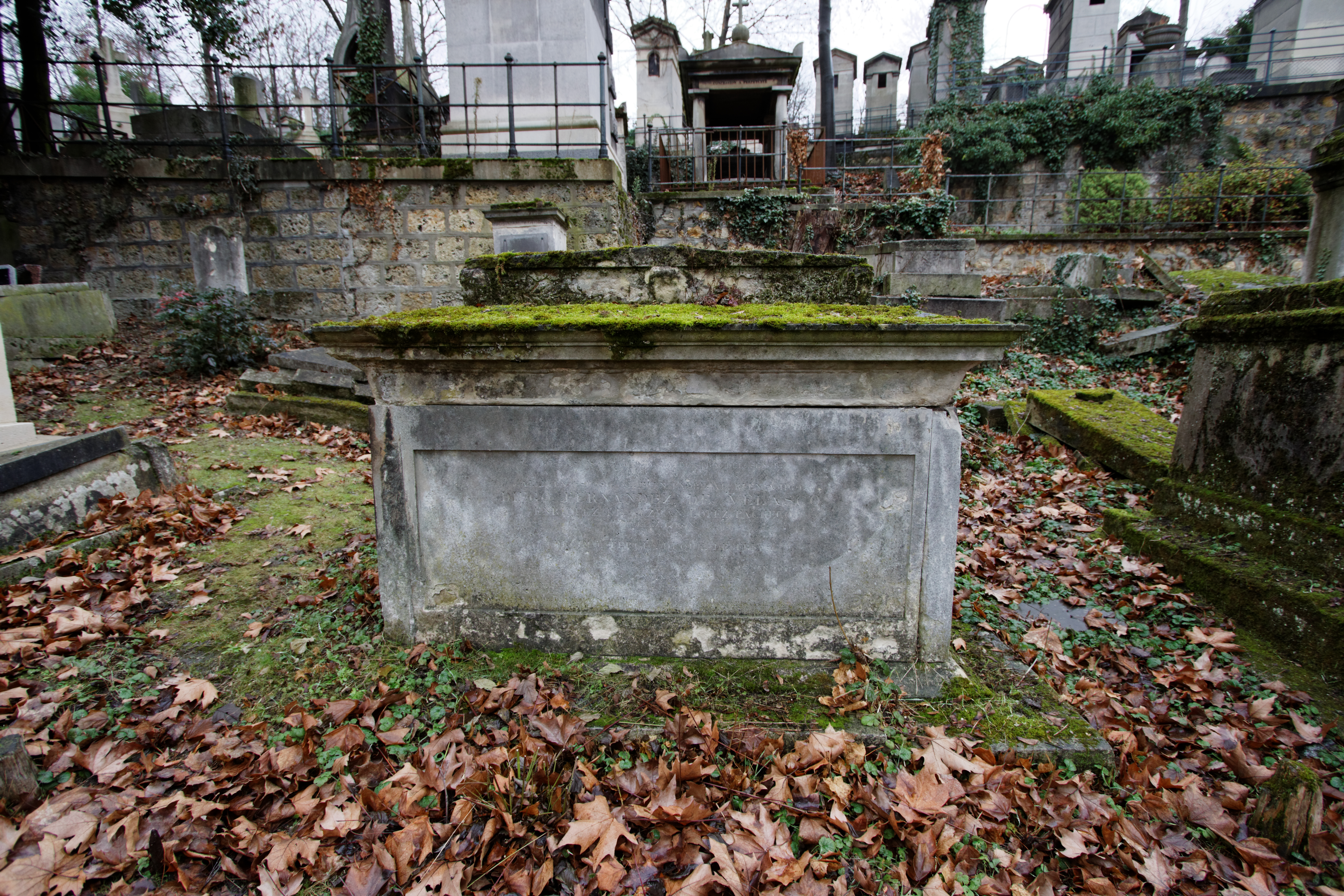
Père Lachaise Cemetery

Fernández de Velasco was appointed colonel of the Leon Infantry Regiment, unit that he himself had raised, in 1793, brigadier in 1794 and field marshal in 1795, seeing action against France during the War of the Pyrenees until the Peace of Basel (1795). He was promoted to lieutenant general in 1802.

During the reign of Charles IV of Spain, Fernández de Velasco was ambassador to Portugal, from 1798 a 1801. When the French invaded Spain in 1808, he chose their side and taking on important duties in the government of Joseph Bonaparte. He played an important role in editing the Bayonne Statute, which was approved on 8 July 1808.

Fernández de Velasco died in 1811 in France, where he was Spanish ambassador. He was buried in the Père Lachaise Cemetery in Paris.
