= Francisco de Sandoval y Rojas, 1st Duke of Lerma =

Spanish politician (1553–1625)

His Eminence The Most Excellent The Duke of Lerma
- Cardinal-priest of San Sisto
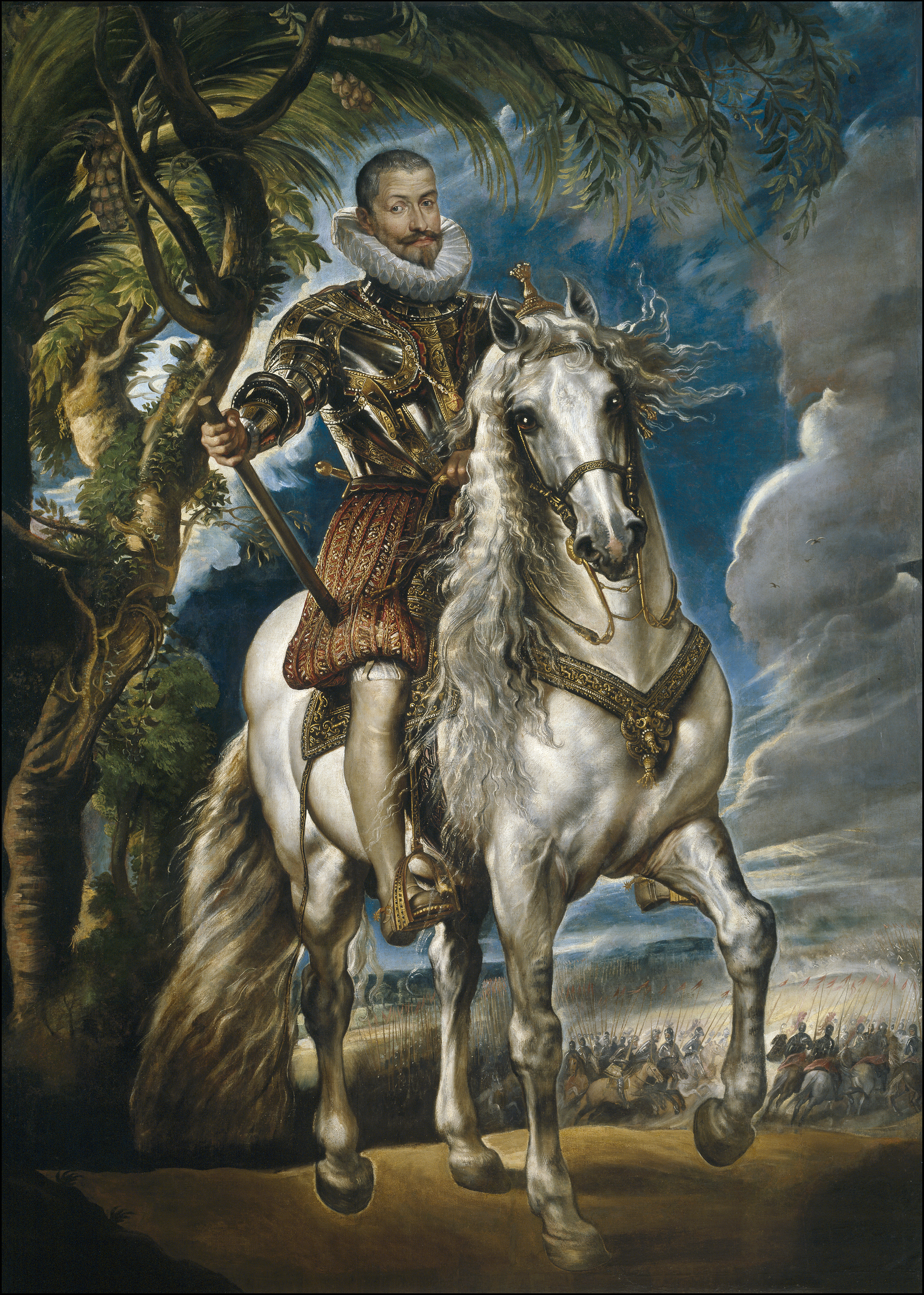
- Francisco Goméz de Sandoval y Rojas, Duke of Lerma, Spanish statesman, by Peter Paul Rubens (1603). Located in the Prado.
- Installed: March 1621
- Term ended: 17 May 1625
- Predecessor: Giambattista Leni
- Successor: Laudivio Zacchia

Orders
- Ordination: March 1622
- Created cardinal: 26 March 1618 by Pope Paul V
- Rank: Cardinal-priest

Personal details
- Born: 1552 Tordesillas, Castile and León, Spain
- Died: 17 May 1625 (aged 72) Valladolid, Castile and León, Spain
- Denomination: Roman Catholic

Valido of the King of Spain
- In office 13 September 1598 – 4 October 1618
- Monarch: Philip III
- Preceded by: Position created
- Succeeded by: Cristóbal Gómez de Sandoval

Viceroy of Portugal and the Algarves
- In office 1598–1600
- Monarch: Philip III
- Preceded by: Albert VII (as viceroy); 1st Regency Council
- Succeeded by: Cristóvão de Moura

Sumiller de Corps
- In office 13 September 1598 – 4 October 1618
- Monarch: Philip III
- Preceded by: Cristóvão de Moura
- Succeeded by: Cristobál Gómez de Sandoval

Caballerizo mayor
- In office 13 September 1598 – 4 October 1618
- Monarch: Philip III
- Preceded by: Diego Fernández de Córdoba
- Succeeded by: Cristobál Gómez de Sandoval

Viceroy of Valencia
- In office 1595–1597
- Monarch: Philip II
- Preceded by: Francisco de Moncada y Cardona
- Succeeded by: Juan Alonso Pimentel de Herrera

Francisco Gómez de Sandoval y Rojas, 1st Duke of Lerma, 5th Marquess of Denia, 1st Count of Ampudia (1552/1553 – 17 May 1625), was a favourite of Philip III of Spain, the first of the validos ('most worthy') through whom the later Habsburg monarchs ruled. His administration was marked by costly wars, including the Twelve Years' Truce with the Dutch Republic, financial mismanagement, and the controversial expulsion of the Moriscos. Eventually, he was deposed in 1618 under a palace intrigue orchestrated by his own son and political rival, Cristóbal de Sandoval. Lerma retired as a cardinal and was succeeded by the Count-Duke of Olivares but faced financial penalties and died in 1625 at Valladolid.

== Biography ==
Believed to have been born in 1552, Francisco de Sandoval was the son of Francisco de Rojas de Sandoval, Count of Lerma and Marquis of Denia. His mother was Isabelle de Borgia, daughter of Saint Francis Borgia, Duke of Gandía and General of the Jesuit Order.

=== Influence ===
The family of Sandoval was ancient and powerful. The future duke of Lerma was born and raised at Tordesillas. As long as Philip II lived, the nobles had little effective share in the government, with the exception of a few who were appointed viceroys or commanded armies abroad. Lerma passed his time as a courtier, and made himself a favourite with the young prince Philip, heir to the Spanish throne. The dying King Philip II foresaw that Lerma was one of those nobles who were likely to mislead the new sovereign. The old king's fears were, it is claimed by some, fully justified after his death. Others however, claim that Lerma was a fully capable favourite, as he led Castile and the Habsburg dominions on a more modest and economically viable course of peace than both Phillip II and Olivares during the reign of Philip IV – both figures that have received far more positive recognition by historians.

According to Friar Juan Fernández de Medrano in 1601, Lerma was viewed by his contemporaries as the singular soul and guiding force of the Spanish monarchy, a leader whose virtues illuminated the kingdom like the Sun governing the heavens. He was seen as "a natural and divinely appointed leader, uniquely capable of maintaining unity and harmony within the state." Admired as the "universal father of the republic," Lerma was regarded as a figure who embodied the principles of religion, obedience, and justice, nurturing them as cultivated virtues. His leadership inspired loyalty and gratitude, seen as "a continuation of divine favor bestowed upon the monarchy, with his qualities likened to the greatness of Augustus."

=== Valido (favourite) ===
No sooner was Philip III king than he entrusted all authority to his favourite, who amassed power unprecedented for a privado or favourite and became the "king's shadow", the filter through whom all information passed, as he was appointed Sumiller de Corps and Caballerizo mayor to the King. Philip III, preoccupied with piety and indolence, soon created him Duke of Lerma (1599), pressured the papacy to make his uncle Bernardo a Cardinal and delegated to him governorship of certain public offices and management responsibility of particular lands, authorized by the King and Queen, of the Kingdoms of Castile and Aragon.

=== Tributes ===
Gifts poured in from outside the royal court. From the Medici in Florence in 1601 came an over-lifesize marble of Samson Slaying a Philistine by Giambologna, presented as a diplomatic gift. It had been made for a Medici garden, and though it had recently been in storage, it was a princely gift (now in the Victoria and Albert Museum, London). Lerma assembled a vast collection of paintings. Duke Mario Farnese sent over a Fra Angelico Annunciation (it was a little old-fashioned), which Lerma passed on to the Dominicans of Valladolid and is now at the Prado, Madrid.

The political treatise República Mista (1602) by Tomás Fernández de Medrano, Lord of Valdeosera, was dedicated to Lerma by Juan Fernández de Medrano y Sandoval, Medrano's son, relative of the Duke of Lerma himself.

=== Foreign policy ===
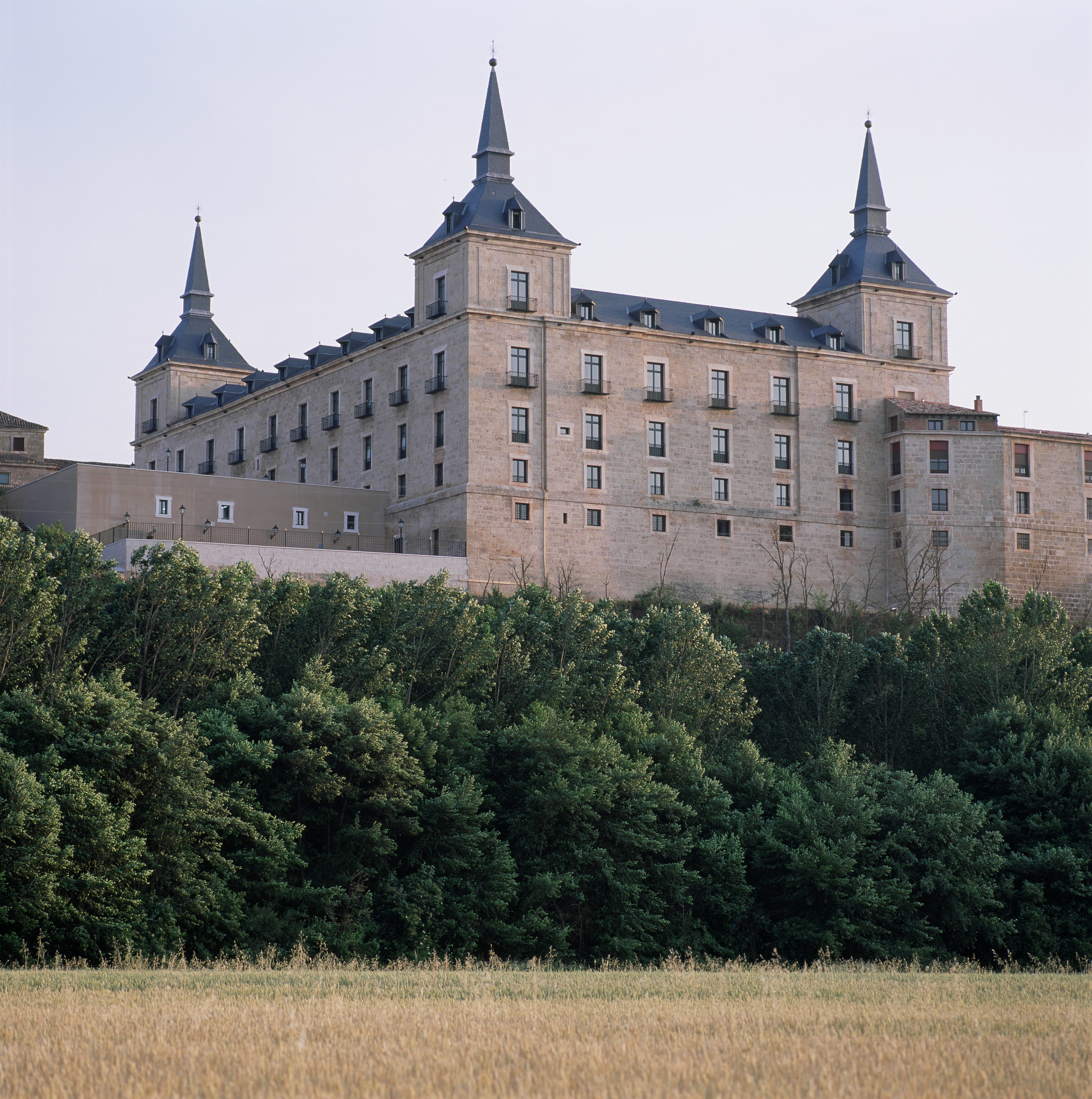
Ducal palace at Lerma.

As chief minister Lerma's ideas of foreign policy were firmly grounded in feudal ideas about royal patrimony. He cemented Spanish rule by many marriage alliances with the Austrian Habsburgs and then with the French Bourbons. Lerma's administration began by making peace with France, in the 1598 Treaty of Vervins in 1598, but he persisted in costly and useless hostilities with England till 1604, when Spain was forced by exhaustion to make peace. Lerma used all his influence against a recognition of the independence of the Low Countries.

Though in 1607 the monarchy declared itself bankrupt, Lerma carried out the ruinous measures for the expulsion of the Moriscos, Moors who had converted to Christianity, from 1609–14, a decision affecting over 300,000 people. A policy motivated by religious and political considerations, in which no economic consideration played a part, the expulsion secured him the admiration of the clergy and was popular with the masses of people. It also provided a short-term boost to the royal treasury from the impounded property of the Moors, but would ruin the economy of Valencia for generations. Lerma's financial horizons remained medieval: his only resources as a finance minister were the debasing of the coinage and edicts against luxury and the making of silver plate.

Bankrupt or not, the war with the Dutch dragged on till 1609, when the Twelve Years' Truce was signed with them. There was constant anti-Spanish agitation in Portugal, which had been dynastically joined to Spain since 1580.

=== Deposition ===
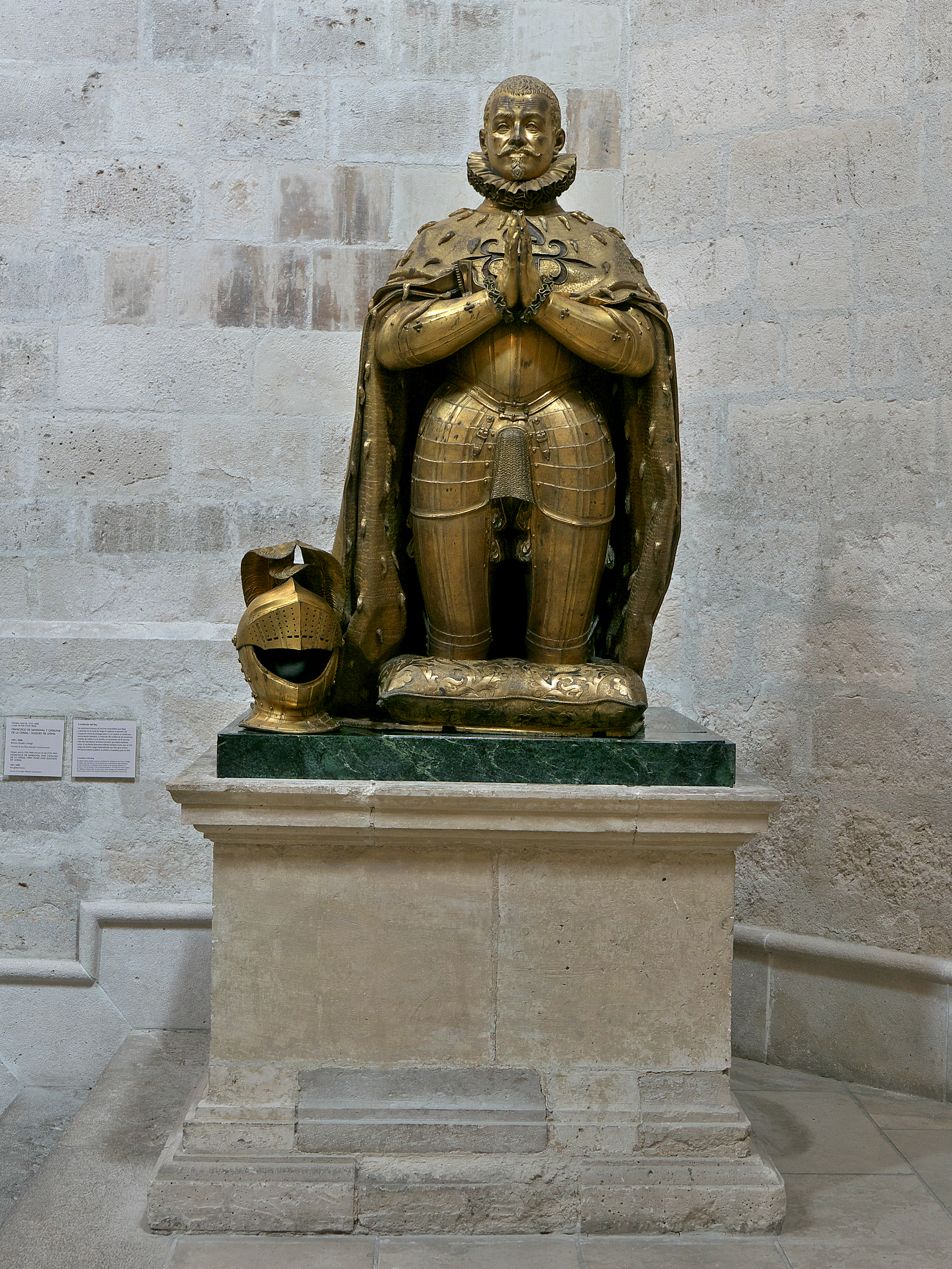
Golden bronze statue of Lerma at the Colegio de San Gregorio, by Juan de Arfe

In the end, Lerma was deposed by a palace intrigue carried out by his own son, Cristóbal de Sandoval, Duke of Uceda, manipulated by Olivares. It is probable that he would never have lost the confidence of Philip III, who divided his life between festivals and prayers, if not for the domestic treachery of his son, who allied himself with the King's confessor, Luis de Aliaga Martínez, whom Lerma had introduced. After a long intrigue in which the King remained silent and passive, Lerma was at last compelled to leave the court, on 4 October 1618.

As a protection, and as a means of retaining some measure of power in case he fell from favour, he had persuaded Pope Paul V to create him cardinal, the previous March (1618). He retired to the Ducal Palace of Lerma, and then to Valladolid, where it was reported that he celebrated Mass every day "with great devotion and tears". When the dying Philip III was presented with a list of prisoners and exiles to be forgiven, he granted grace to all except the cardinal-duke of Lerma. When Lerma learned the news, he started from Valladolid to Madrid but was intercepted on the road and commanded by Olivares, favorite of the heir to the throne, who professed an implacable hatred for the cardinal, to return to Valladolid. The Cardinal was in Villacastín and remained there until he learned of the death of the King. Then he went back to Valladolid to celebrate the requiem in the church of San Pablo. He was ordered by the count of Olivares to reside in Tordesillas but he did not obey and appealed to Pope Gregory XV and the College of Cardinals defended him, considering his banishment an attempt against ecclesiastical freedom and the prestige of the cardinalate.

During the reign of Philip IV, which began in 1621, Lerma was despoiled of part of his wealth. The Cardinal was sentenced, on 3 August 1624, to return to the state over a million ducats. Lerma died in 1625 at Valladolid.

== Marriage and issue ==
In 1576, the Duke of Lerma married Catalina de la Cerda y Portugal (1551–1603), daughter of Juan de la Cerda, 4th Duke of Medinaceli. They had 5 children:

- Cristóbal de Sandoval, Duke of Uceda (1577–1624), his successor.
- Diego de Sandoval (died 1632), married Luisa de Mendoza, VII Condesa de Saldaña.
- Juana de Sandoval (died 1624), married Manuel Pérez de Guzmán y Silva, 8th Duke of Medina Sidonia.
  - Luisa de Guzmán (1613–1666), married John II, 8th Duke of Braganza, later crowned King John IV of Portugal.
- Catalina de Sandoval (died 1648), married Pedro Fernández de Castro, 7th count of Lemos.
- Francisca de Sandoval (died 1663), married Diego López de Zúñiga Avellaneda, 2nd Duke of Peñaranda de Duero.

== Domestic policy ==
When Lerma fell from power in 1618, his status as cardinal (which he had acquired for exactly this purpose 6 months earlier) gave him immunity from prosecution by his numerous enemies, who instead turned on Lerma's trusted and unscrupulous secretary, Rodrigo Calderón, Count of Oliva (d. 1621), who as Lerma's agent was made a scapegoat. Calderón was tortured and executed on trumped up charges of witchcraft and other crimes, which demonstrated what would likely have been Lerma's fate, if a cardinal's hat had not protected his head.

Lerma was also responsible for the appointment of Don Pedro Franqueza to reform royal finances, but who instead managed to embezzle enough funds to purchase the title of Count of Villalonga. He was put on trial and forfeited his riches.

At a time when the state was practically bankrupt, he encouraged the King in extravagance, and accumulated for himself a fortune estimated by contemporaries at forty-four million ducats.

On the hilltop overlooking the village of Lerma in Old Castile that provided his grand title, the duke built a palace (1606–1617, by Francisco de Mora) capped with corner towers, on the site of a fortification, ranged round a double-arcaded courtyard facing an arcaded square and linked to the rebuilt church of San Pedro via a private passageway. Lerma was pious, spending lavishly on religious houses.

== In fiction ==
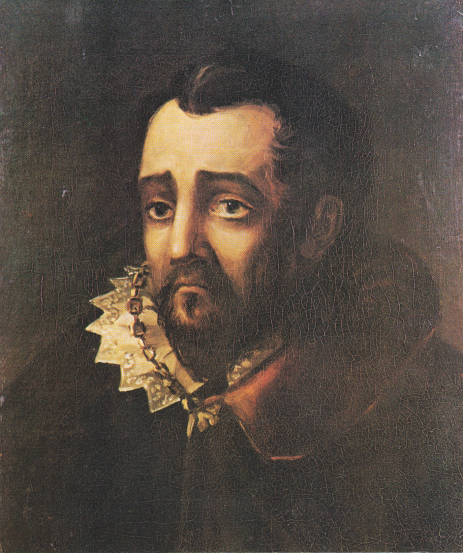
Fictional "Duke of Lerma", 19th century painting by Mikhail Lermontov

- Lerma is mentioned in the early 18th-century picaresque novel Gil Blas (Chapter IV) by Alain-Rene Lesage.
- A young Mikhail Lermontov associated his surname with Lerma's title, which is an obvious fiction; even the family legend traced back the name to Thomas Learmonth the Rhymer from Scotland, but not to Lerma. The poet painted an imaginary portrait of the "Duke of Lerma" and created some other works featuring Spaniards.
- Anachronistically, a "Duke of Lerma" features as one of the minor characters in the 1867 opera Don Carlos by Giuseppe Verdi.
- A fictionalized, more treasonous version of Lerma, renamed the "Duke of Lorca," is the villain of the 1948 film Adventures of Don Juan played by Errol Flynn.

== See also ==
- Lerma, Burgos
- The Great Favourite

== Bibliography ==
- Antonio Feros, Kingship and Favoritism in the Spain of Philip III, 1598–1621 (Cambridge Studies in Early Modern History), New York: Cambridge U. Press. 2000.
- Patrick Williams, The great favourite: The Duke of Lerma and the court and government of Philip III of Spain, 1598–1621. Manchester and New York: Manchester University Press, 2006.
- Sarah Schroth, The Picture Collection of the Duke of Lerma, 2002.
- The history of Lerma's tenure of office is in vol. xv. of the Historia General de Espana of Modesto Lafuente (Madrid, 1855)—with references to contemporary authorities.
- Lisa A. Banner, The Religious Patronage of the Duke of Lerma, 1598–1621, Ashgate, 2009. Discusses his patronage of churches, paintings, architects and painters.
