= Cristóbal Gómez de Sandoval, 1st Duke of Uceda =

Official minister of state in Spain

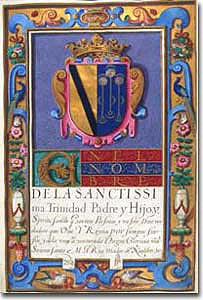
Document of 1611 by which Philip III grants Cristóbal Gómez de Sandoval, first duke of Uceda, the right to tax the town of Uceda and lands under the Duke's jurisdiction.

Cristóbal Gómez de Sandoval-Rojas y de la Cerda, known as the Duque de Uceda (Duke of Uceda), but also titled second marquis of Cea, fifth marquis of Denia, and knight of the order of Santiago (1581 – 31 May 1624 in Alcalá de Henares) was the official minister of state, also known as the valido or valued one, for King Philip III of Spain. He engineered the exile of his father the Duke of Lerma, from the court, and his own succession to the position.

== Biography ==
Son of Francisco Gómez de Sandoval y Rojas, Duke of Lerma and Catalina de la Cerda, main lady in waiting for the Queen consort Margaret of Austria. His birthdate and place are unclear, and placed between 1577 and 1581. In 1597 Cristóbal married Mariana de Padilla Manrique, daughter of Martín de Padilla Manrique, first count of Santa Gadea and Adelantado Mayor of Castile. Her mother was Luisa Manrique de Lara, eighth Countess of Buendía. They had seven children, three of whom reached adult age, including:

- Luisa Gómez de Sandoval-Rojas y Padilla who married Juan Alfonso Enríquez de Cabrera, IX Admiral of Castile and Duke of Medina de Rioseco.
- Isabel Gómez de Sandoval-Rojas y Padilla who married Juan Tellez-Girón y Enriquez de Ribera, 4th Duke of Osuna.
- Francisco Gómez de Sandoval-Rojas y Padilla, who became the second Duke of Uceda, and who married Felice Enríquez de Cabrera.

In 1609, he bought Uceda, and the subsequent year received the title of Duke of Uceda from the King. The intrigue by Cristóbal to replace his father as valido included known opponents of the Duke of Lerma, including the royal confessor, Luis de Aliaga, and Gaspar de Guzmán, Count-Duke of Olivares. In 1618, the unpopular Duke of Lerma fell from favor, and was subsequently made a cardinal with offices outside of Madrid.

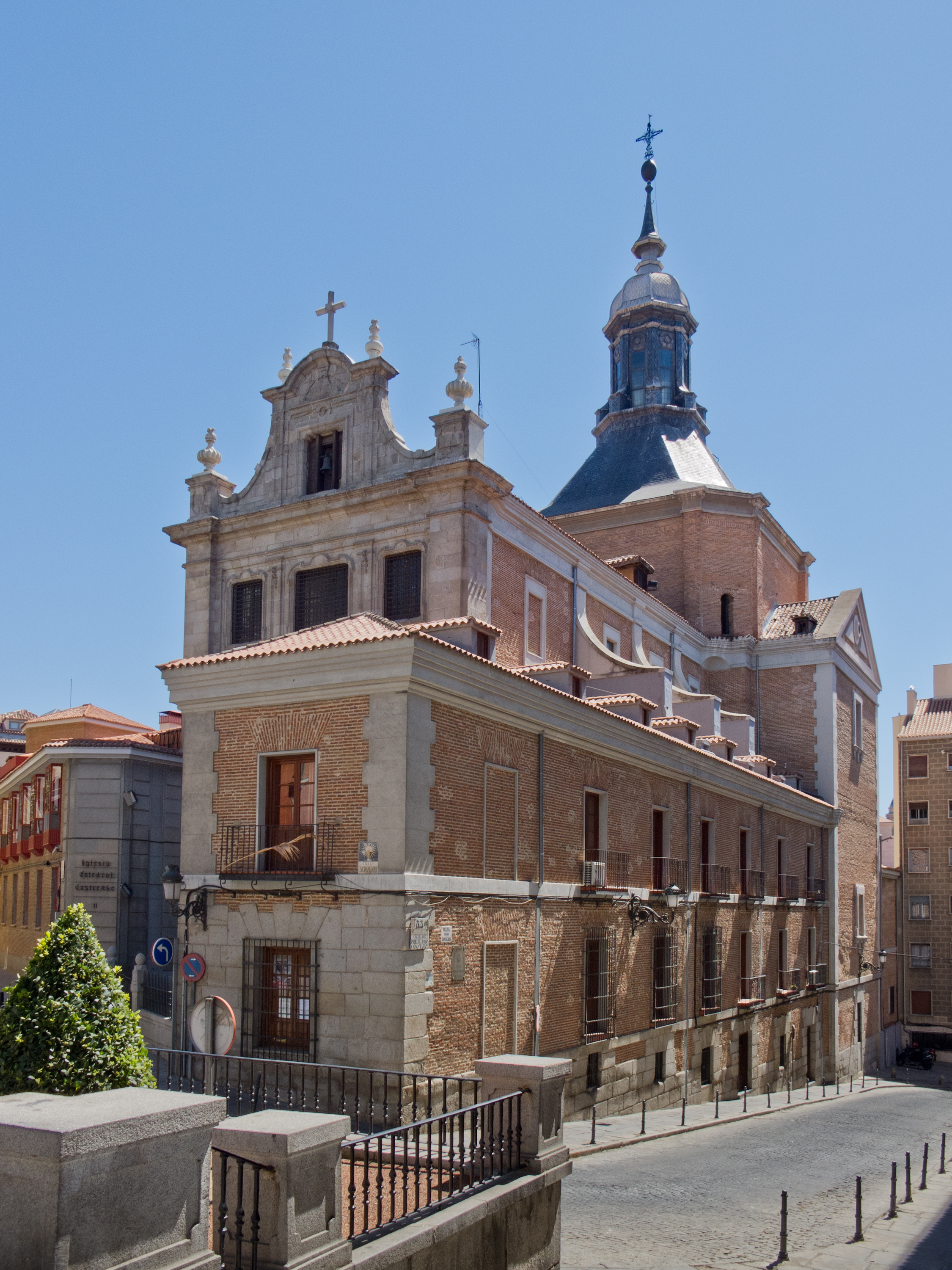
Church of the Convent of the Holiest Sacrament (Santisimo Sacramento) founded by the Duke of Uceda in 1615 in Madrid

The Duke of Uceda, appointed as Sumiller de Corps and Caballerizo mayor to the King, followed a policy to benefit landowning nobility, including his clan. He built the ostentatious Palace of the Duke of Uceda in Madrid. In foreign policy, he continued the suppression of the religious-based Bohemian Revolt, and sought the annexation of Portugal. In 1621, upon the ascent of Philip IV of Spain, he was substituted in an intrigue, which involved his former ally, the Count-Duke of Olivares, who replaced him. Cristóbal, like his father was exiled to a castle in Torrejón de Velasco. Much of his property was confiscated, and though he was briefly released and gained some level of pardon, he was re-arrested and died in jail at Alcalá de Henares.

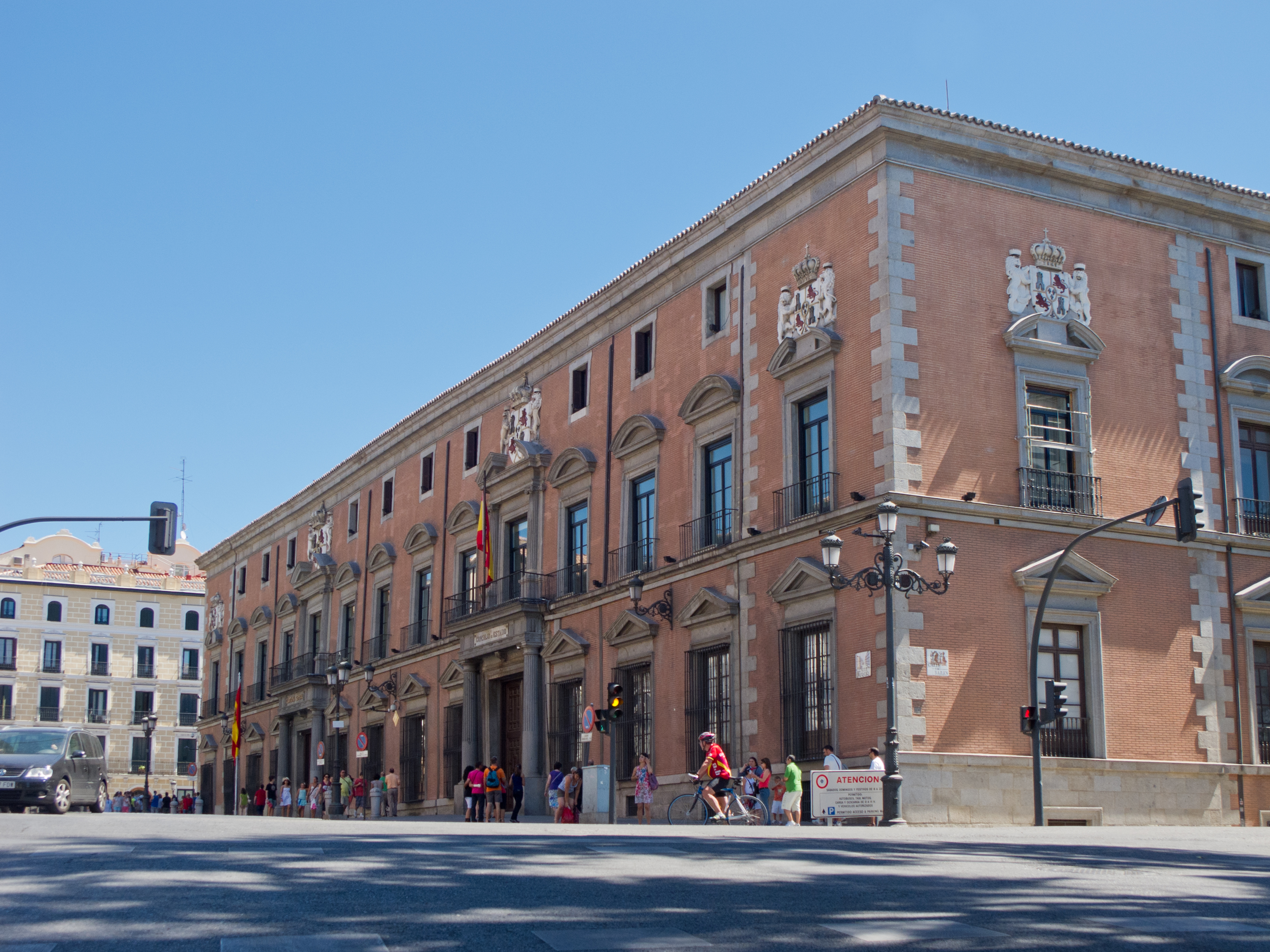
Palace of the Duke of Uceda, or Palacio de los Consejos, in Madrid
