= Isabella of Aragon, Queen of Portugal =

Queen of Portugal from 1497 to 1498

Isabella of Aragon
- Princess of Asturias
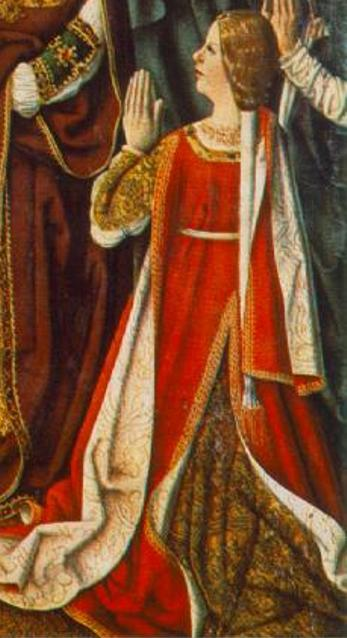
- Detail from the Madonna of the Catholic Monarchs, c. 1491–93

Queen consort of Portugal
- Tenure: 30 September 1497 – 23 August 1498
- Born: 2 October 1470; Dueñas, Castile
- Died: 23 August 1498 (aged 27); Zaragoza, Aragon
- Burial: Convent of Santa Isabel
- Spouses: Afonso, Prince of Portugal (m. 1490; died 1491) Manuel I, King of Portugal (m. 1497)
- Issue: Miguel de la Paz, Prince of Portugal, Asturias, and Girona
- House: Trastámara
- Father: Ferdinand II of Aragon
- Mother: Isabella I of Castile

Isabella, Princess of Asturias (2 October 1470 – 23 August 1498), also known as Isabella of Aragon, was the eldest child and heiress presumptive of King Ferdinand II of Aragon and Queen Isabella I of Castile. She was Queen of Portugal as the wife of King Manuel I from 30 September 1497 until her death the following year.

== Early life ==
Isabella was the eldest child of Ferdinand II of Aragon and Isabella I of Castile. Born during the reign of her uncle, Henry IV of Castile, the early years of her life were defined by the tension between him and her mother, as her uncle would not forgive her mother for marrying Ferdinand without his permission. Upon the death of Henry IV in 1474, Isabella's mother claimed the throne of Castile, and the young Isabella was swiftly sworn as the heiress presumptive to the throne.

The early years of the reign of Isabella I were spent embroiled in a war of succession, as Henry IV had not specifically named a successor. A struggle ensued between Isabella I and her niece Joanna, who was known as "la Beltraneja" due to the rumors that she was the illegitimate child of Henry IV's queen Joan of Portugal and his favourite, Beltrán de la Cueva, 1st Duke of Alburquerque. Afonso V of Portugal, who was Henry IV's brother-in-law and young Joanna's uncle, intervened on Joanna's behalf and Ferdinand and Isabella were forced into a war with Portugal.

During the war, young Isabella witnessed some of the chaos for herself. While her parents were fighting the Portuguese, the princess was left in Segovia while the city was placed under the control of Andrés de Cabrera and his wife Beatriz de Bobadilla. The city's residents, unhappy with this new administration, rose up and seized control of the city. The then-seven-year-old princess was trapped in a tower of the Alcázar for some time until her mother returned to Segovia and took control of the situation.

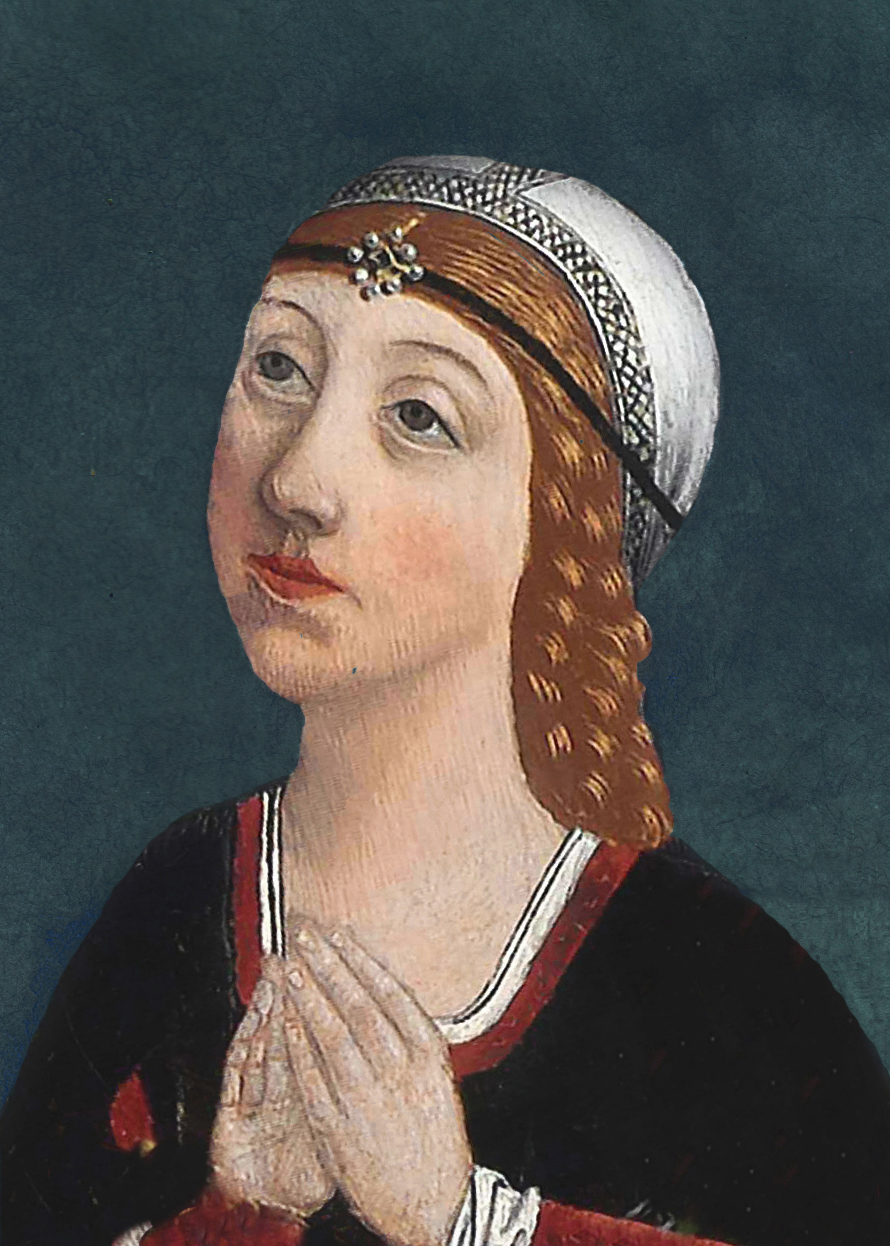
Isabel de Trastámara as a child

The war ended in 1479 with the Treaty of Alcáçovas. Among the terms were the provision that Princess Isabella would marry the grandson of Afonso V, Afonso, who was five years younger than the princess. The treaty also provided that Ferdinand and Isabella would pay a large dowry for their daughter and that the princess would reside in Portugal as a guarantee that her parents would abide by the treaty terms. In 1480, Prince Afonso went to live in the town of Moura with his maternal grandmother Beatrice, Duchess of Viseu, and was joined in the early months of the following year by his future wife, the ten-year-old Isabella. She spent three years in Portugal before returning home.

Isabella also spent a considerable part of her youth on campaign with her parents as they conquered the remaining Muslim states in southern Spain. For example, she accompanied her mother in accepting the surrender of the city of Baza.

== Marriages ==
Her first marriage was to her second cousin Prince Afonso, the only son and heir of King John II of Portugal from his marriage with Eleanor of Viseu. The wedding, by proxy, took place in the spring of 1490 in Seville. On 19 November of that year, Isabella arrived in Badajoz, where she was welcomed by Afonso's cousin Manuel, the future King Manuel I of Portugal, whom she would eventually marry six years after her husband's death. Afonso and Isabella were reunited in Elvas on 22 November and, on the following day, Isabella met her mother-in-law, Queen Eleanor, in the Convento do Espinheiro in Évora, where the court had gathered to ratify the marriage that had been celebrated earlier in Seville.

Though the marriage had been arranged by the Treaty of Alcáçovas, the marriage quickly became a love match. Isabella proved a popular figure with the Portuguese royal family due to her knowledge of their language and customs brought about by the years she spent in Portugal as a child. Isabella's happy life in Portugal came to an abrupt end in July 1491, however, when Afonso was killed in a riding accident. She was heartbroken and later became convinced that he had died because God was angry that Portugal had provided a refuge for the Jews that her parents had expelled from Spain.

She was eventually sent back to Spain at the request of her parents, and Isabella returned to them devoutly religious. She underwent efforts to starve and scourge herself, something she would do for much of the rest of her life as part of her mourning for Afonso. She also declared that she would never marry again. Her parents seem to have humored her declaration at first, but after the death of John II of Portugal in 1495, he was succeeded by Manuel I of Portugal, who immediately sought Isabella's hand. Isabella and Manuel were first cousins once removed as he was a maternal first cousin to Isabella's mother. Ferdinand and Isabella, perhaps trying to respect their daughter's wishes, offered him the hand of one of their younger daughters, Maria, but he refused. There remained a stalemate between them until Princess Isabella agreed to marry Manuel on the condition that he expel all Jews from Portugal who would not convert to Christianity. He agreed to her ultimatum and they married in September 1497.

== Heir presumptive ==
In the same year as her second marriage, Isabella became Princess of Asturias and heir presumptive of the Crown of Castile following the sudden death of her only brother, John, Prince of Asturias, in October 1497, and the stillbirth of his daughter. Philip of Austria, the husband of Isabella's younger sister Joanna, claimed the crown, although Isabella had precedence as the eldest daughter. The Catholic Monarchs, to counter the pretensions of their son-in-law Philip, held courts in the city of Toledo in 1498 a few months after the death of their son John and had Isabella and her husband Manuel sworn as the legitimate heirs presumptive. The royal family then went to Zaragoza to convene the courts of Aragon for the same purpose. Although female succession was permitted in Castile, Ferdinand II's kingdom of Aragon hesitated to accept a woman as their future ruler. If she were to give birth to a son, then the child could inherit everything, something much preferred to female rule.

Isabella was pregnant at that time and, while in Zaragoza with the royal family, she gave birth on 23 August 1498 to her only child, Miguel da Paz, Prince of Portugal. Perhaps because of her constant fasting and self-denial, or the constant traveling at her advanced stage of pregnancy, she died within an hour of her son's birth. Her son was later recognized as heir presumptive by the courts of Portugal, Castile, and Aragon.

Isabella asked to be buried dressed as a nun and to be interred at the Convent of Santa Isabel in Toledo. Manuel's chance to become King of Castile ended with Isabella's death, and the primary hope of uniting all of the Iberian kingdoms vanished with Prince Miguel's death just before his second birthday in 1500.

When Queen Isabella of Castile died in 1504, she requested that the body of her daughter Isabella be moved to rest by her side in Granada, but this was never done.

== Ancestry ==
Ancestors of Isabella of Aragon

8. Ferdinand I of Aragon
4. John II of Aragon
9. Eleanor of Alburquerque
2. Ferdinand II of Aragon
10. Fadrique Enríquez
5. Juana Enríquez
11. Mariana Fernández de Córdoba
1. Isabella of Aragon
12. Henry III of Castile
6. John II of Castile
13. Catherine of Lancaster
3. Isabella I of Castile
14. John, Constable of Portugal
7. Isabella of Portugal
15. Isabel of Barcelos

== Bibliography ==
- Downey, Kirsten (2014). Isabella: the Warrior Queen. New York: Nan A. Talese/Doubleday. ISBN 9780385534116.
- Fernández Álvarez, Manuel (2003). Isabel la Católica (in Spanish). Madrid: Espasa-Calpe. ISBN 84-670-1260-9.
- Rodrigues Oliveira, Ana (2010). Rainhas medievais de Portugal. Dezassete mulheres, duas dinastias, quatro séculos de História (in Portuguese). Lisbon: A esfera dos livros. ISBN 978-989-626-261-7.

Isabella of Aragon, Queen of Portugal House of Trastámara Born: 2 October 1470 Died: 24 August 1498
Portuguese royalty
Vacant Title last held by Eleanor of Viseu	Queen consort of Portugal; 1497–1498	Vacant Title next held by Maria of Aragon
Spanish nobility
Preceded by Joanna	Princess of Asturias; 1476–1478	Succeeded by John
Preceded by John	Princess of Asturias; 1497–1498	Succeeded by Michael
