= Alfonso Enríquez =

- Lord of Medina de Rioseco; Admiral of Castile
- Arms of Alfonso Enríquez
- Born: 1354; Guadalcanal
- Died: 1429 (aged 74–75); Guadalupe
- Buried: Monastery of Santa Clara, Palencia
- Noble family: House of Enríquez
- Spouse: Juana de Mendoza
- Issue Detail: Fadrique Enríquez
- Father: Fadrique Alfonso
- Mother: Paloma Ben Yahia

Alfonso Enríquez, also known as Alonso Enríquez (Guadalcanal, 1354 – Guadalupe, 1429) was Lord of Medina de Rioseco and Admiral of Castile.

== Background ==
Alfonso Enríquez de Castilla was the illegitimate son of Fadrique Alfonso, 25th Master of the Order of Santiago, and Paloma Ben Yahia. His father was murdered on 29 May 1358 in the Alcázar of Seville, on the orders of his brother Peter.

He was the founder of the lineage of Enríquez, and is the first Admiral of Castile of his family since 1405, and first lord of Medina de Rio Seco. His paternal grandparents were King Alfonso XI of Castile and Eleanor de Guzmán. He was a nephew of King Henry II of Castile and cousin of King John I of Castile. His brother was Pedro Enríquez de Castilla, Count of Trastámara, Lemos and Sarria, Constable of Castile and Pertiguero mayor de Santiago. His sister was Eleanor of Castile, who married the Marshal of Castile Diego Gomez Sarmiento.

== Biography ==
Alfonso Enríquez remained hidden while living his uncle Pedro I of Castile, who ordered to kill his father in 1358 in the Alcazar of Seville. Although contemporary Castilian chroniclers wrapped the figure of his mother in mystery and later genealogists do not mention her, other authors, for example, the Portuguese Fernão Lopes wrote in connection with events that occurred in 1384, that the Admiral was the son of a Jewess. Her name was Paloma Bat Gedaliah, of the Ben Yahia dynasty. The family arrived in Castille around 1000 CE.

The "Memorial of old things" attributed to the dean of Toledo, Diego de Castilla, said Fadrique had Alfonso from a Jewess from Guadalcanal called Paloma (pigeon, dove). He tells a story where King Ferdinand the Catholic was hunting and was a hawk with a heron and both walked away, leaving the king to follow, and Martin de Rojas was always with the hawk until he saw it leave and throw after a dove. Asking the king for his hawk, Martin replied, "Lord, there goes after our grandmother", being Martin a descendant of Paloma himself.

In 1389, John I of Castile gave him the area around Aguilar de Campos. In later years, he managed to extend his territory. Until 1402, he served the King as a commander and administered the castle of Medina de Rioseco. In 1387, Alfonso married Juana de Mendoza. In 1395, together with his wife, he restarted the construction of the Monastery of Santa Clara de Palencia, which had been begun by Henry II of Castile and his wife Queen Juana Manuel, by planning the church and cemetery of the Admirals of Castile.

It is conjectured that it must have been at the behest of his wife that the title of Admiral of Castile passed to him upon the death of her brother Diego Hurtado de Mendoza in 1405, who held that post. In addition to military action at sea, this post also involved trying to obtain civil and criminal jurisdiction over all ports of the kingdom of Granada, culminating after three years with the taking of Antequera.

The Enríquez family held the title of Admiral of Castile from 1405 to 1705. Alfonso was the most famous admiral in the family, winning many sea battles.

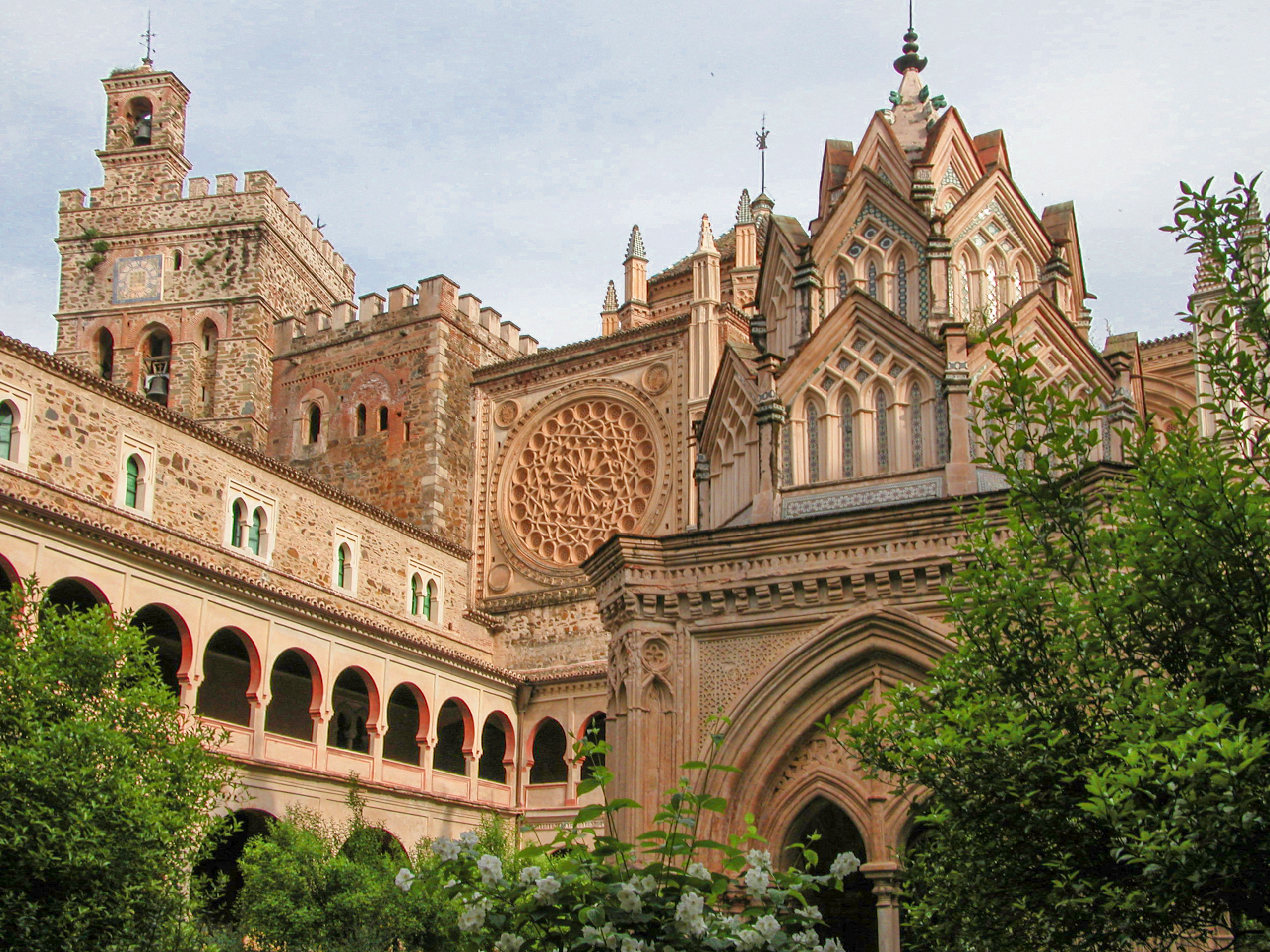
The monastery in Guadelupe where Alfonso Enríquez died in 1429

In 1407, he defeated the combined fleet of Tunis (Hafsid), Granada (Nasrid) and Tlemcen (Capital city of the Zianid Kingdom of Tlemcen). This was his last major sea battle. Afterward, he inspected the fleet and led military actions on land, such as the capture of Antequera in 1410. He was involved in the court's political undertakings and in its feasts.

In 1421, John II of Castile granted him the lordship of Medina de Rio Seco "for the many good and loyal and outstanding and distinguished services done to King Don Juan my grandfather and to King Henry my father and my lord, and still does to me," instead he chose to settle and establish primogeniture in favor of his children. The city is since known as the City of the admirals. At the end of his life, he retired to the monastery of Santa María de Guadalupe, where he died in 1429 at the age of 75. He was buried with his wife and several children in the monastery of Santa Clara de Palencia, which they had been founders.

In his will, he left the monastery 11000maravedís for the construction of four chapels. His widow donated another 10000maravedís.

The poet and biographer Fernán Pérez de Guzmán, a contemporary of Alfonso's, described him as medium-sized, chubby, red-haired, discrete and not a talker. The historian Esteban de Garibay (1533–1600) described him as hot-tempered and quickly irritated.

=== Nuptials and offspring ===
In 1387, Alfonso Enríquez, posing as a servant, asked Juana de Mendoza (widowed by the Battle of Aljubarrota, August 1385), if she would marry his Lord (himself). The disguised Alfonso received the answer that Alfonso Enríquez was the son of a "marrana" (family of converted Jews), at which the supposed servant slapped her. Revealing his trickery, it is said that was requested the presence of a priest to marry them "for let it not be said that any man had raised his hand to her who was not her husband." It is also said that on one occasion, having arrived late at night, he had to sleep with his company in the field, receiving the explanation the following day from the haughty Mendoza that "No self respecting Castilian woman would open the doors of her castle to anyone at night."

Alfonso and Juana had the following children:

- Fadrique Enríquez (first-born, c. 1388), married to Mariana Fernandez de Cordoba and Ayala, and father of Queen Juana of Aragon;
- Enrique Enríquez de Mendoza (died c. 1489), started the lineages of Enríquez de Toledo and Enríquez de Guzmán, Count of Alba de Liste title since August 8, 1451 by John II of Castile;
- Pedro Enríquez, who died as a child (not be confused with Pedro Enriquez de Quinones, son of his brother Frederic Enriquez);
- Beatriz Enríquez (?–1439), married to Pedro de Portocarrero and Cabeza de Vaca, lord of Moguer, son of Martin Fernandez Portocarrero, IV lord of Moguer, and Eleanor Cabeza de Vaca; she was buried in the Convent of Poor Clares of Mudejar style Moguer;
- Leonor Enríquez, married in 1410 to Rodrigo Pimentel Alonso Téllez de Meneses, II Count of Benavente;
- Aldonza Enríquez, married in 1410 to Rodrigo Alvarez Osorio;
- Isabel Enríquez (?–1469), married to Juan Ramirez de Arellano, lord of the Cameros;
- Inés Enríquez, married to Juan Hurtado de Mendoza, lord of Almazan;
- Blanca Enríquez, married to Pedro Nunez de Herrera, lord of Herrera and second Lord of Pedraza; a daughter of this marriage, Elvira de Herrera y Enríquez, married Pedro Fernández de Córdoba, V Lord of Aguilar, being parents, among others, of Gonzalo Fernández de Córdoba, the Great Captain;
- Constanza Enríquez, married to Juan de Tovar, Lord of Berlanga;
- Maria Enríquez (?–1441), married to Juan de Rojas and Manrique, lord of Monzón Campos, mayor of Castile and doncel of the king, who took part in the Battle of La Higueruela in The Vega of Granada, next to John II of Castile and the Constable Alvaro de Luna;
- Mencia Enríquez (?–1480), married in 1430 to Juan Fernandez Manrique de Lara, Count de Castañeda since 1436;
- Rodrigo Enríquez, whom his mother in his will of 1431 leaves some property, calling him "my son, the Archdeacon Rodrigo Enriquez."; he was buried in the Cathedral of Palencia.

Out of wedlock he had an illegitimate son:

- Juan Enríquez, who his father, before going to Seville, had left as captain general of the fleet as he was a "tried and true knight."

=== Legend of the Christ of the Clear ===
In the chapel of the Holy Christ of the Church of Santa Clara de Palencia a reclining Christ is venerated introduced in a glass case. It is said that on one of Alfonso's ships, sailing in the war against the Moors in the years 1407 to 1410, a lookout spotted something strangely glowing. Approaching to address they found that it was a glass case that housed the image of Christ laying down. Alfonso surprised by the finding in such a place, decided to move it to Palenzuela. Being transported on the back of an animal, escorted by soldiers and knights to reach this Reinoso de Cerrato, the animal stubbornly decided to stop in front of the castle where Poor Clares nuns had resided. When they let the animal loose, it headed towards the monastery of Poor Clares. Seen as a divine decision, they left the picture there for veneration, now known as the Cristo de las Claras.
