= House of Enríquez =

Spanish noble family

Arms of the House of Enríquez.

The House of Enríquez is a Spanish noble lineage of royal origin.

== History ==
The House of Enríquez originated in the Crown of Castile, in the person of Frederick of Castile (Casa de Borgoña), natural son of King Alfonso XI of Castile and Eleanor de Guzmán, and twin brother of Henry II of Castile, who gave his name to the lineage ("Enríquez" being a patronymic form of Henry or Enrique). The House of Enríquez is a cadet branch of the House of Ivrea.

From a political point of view, the family became the most powerful of Castile, displaying the dignity of Admirals of Castile for nearly 200 years and earning the Duchy of Medina de Rioseco. They were part of the elite aristocratic power in Castile during the Middle Ages and, along with 19 other Spanish lineages, were recognized by Charles V in 1520 as one of the first Grandees of Spain. Titles held by members of the house also include “Señor de Haro” and “Masters of the Order of Santiago.”

Jurisdictionally, they guarded the manors of Mansilla, Medina de Rioseco, Melgar, Palenzuela, Peñafiel, Rueda, Torrelobatón and Tarifa.

Juana Enríquez, great-granddaughter of the founder of the lineage, married John II of Aragon and was the mother of Ferdinand II of Aragon.

Previously, the descendants of Henry of Castile, son of King Ferdinand III of Castile, also received the surname Enríquez.

== Members ==
1. Fadrique Alfonso de Castilla (1333–58)
2. Alonso Enríquez y Angulo de Córdoba (1354–1429) — Juana de Mendoza (1352–1431)
3. Fadrique Enríquez de Mendoza (c.1388–1473) — Marina Díez de Córdoba y Ayala
4. Alfonso Enríquez (c.1435–1485)
  Juana Enríquez de Mendoza (1425–68) — King Juan II de Aragón
5. Fadrique Enriquez de Cabrera (1485–1538) — Ana de Cabrera
6. Fernando Enríquez (1538–42) — María Girón
7. Luis Enríquez (1542–67)
8. Luis II Enríquez (1567–96) — Ana de Mendoza
9. Luis III Enríquez de Cabrera (1596–1600) — Vittoria Colonna
10. Juan Alfonso Enríquez de Cabrera (1600–47)
11. Juan Gaspar Enríquez de Cabrera (1647–91)
12. Juan Tomás Enríquez de Cabrera (1691–1702)
13. Pascual Enríquez de Cabrera (1739)
14. María de la Almudena Enríquez de Cabrera (1779).
