= Fadrique Enríquez (died 1473) =

Castilian noble (1390–1473)

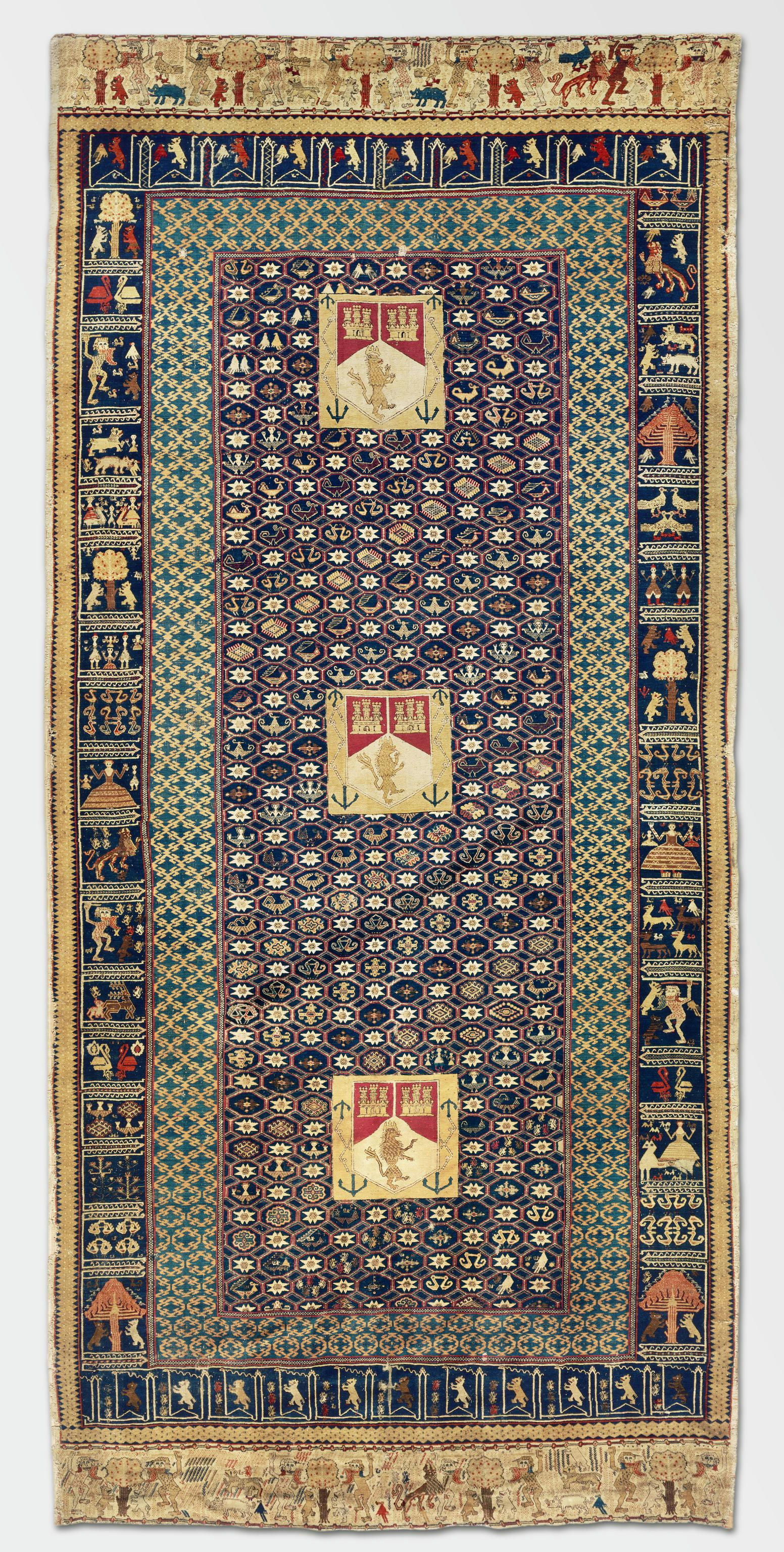
- Carpet probably made for Fadrique Enríquez, whose coat of arms — an upright lion beneath two triple-towered castles bordered by anchors and ropes — is repeated three times in the center field. A decorative pattern in the main border at each end, formed by designs that resemble Arabic script, indicates its Mudéjar workmanship. Philadelphia Museum of Art
- Born: 1390
- Died: 23 December 1473
- Noble family: House of Enríquez
- Spouses: Marina Fernández de Córdoba; Teresa Fernández de Quiñones
- Issue Detail: Juana Enríquez
- Father: Alonso Enríquez
- Mother: Juana de Mendoza

Fadrique Enríquez de Mendoza (1390 – 23 December 1473) was the second Admiral of Castile from House of Enríquez, Count of Melgar and Rueda, and second Lord of Medina del Rioseco. He was a son of Alonso Enríquez, the first admiral of Castile from House of Enríquez.

== 1426-1445 ==
Fadrique's father, Alonso Enríquez, was the illegitimate son of Fadrique, the 5th illegitimate son of Alfonso XI of Castile. The Enríquez family was an important family because of this descent from the royal line and their many possessions in Castile. When his father died in 1429, Alonso Fadrique inherited his estate and titles, including ricohombre, Master of Order of Santiago, lord of Medina de Rioseco, Castro Verde and Torrelobatón. According to his contemporary Hernando del Pulgar (1436–1492), he was small in stature, a little nearsighted, and he gained much honor and fame with his performance as commander of the fleet of Castile.

Fadrique played an important role at court as one of the main advisers of King John II of Castile. He became involved in the conspiracy against the influential Constable of Castile Álvaro de Luna.

In 1426, Fadrique Enríquez married Marina Fernández de Córdoba, 4th Lady of Casarrubios (1385–1431). Marina gave birth to a daughter, Juana Enríquez, Queen of Aragon.

In 1431, he and Alvaro de Luna arrested Commander Diego Sarmiento because the latter did not obey the orders of the king. In the same year, his wife Marina died.

In 1432, he fought alongside Pedro Manrique de Lara against the princes Henry and Peter near Cáceres, Alburquerque and Acagala.

On May 9, 1432, Fadrique married his second wife, Teresa Fernández de Quiñones, with whom he had nine children.

In 1437, when King John II of Castile had Pedro Manrique arrested, Fadrique came into conflict with the king. In August 1438, Pedro managed to escape from his prison in Fuentedueñas. Fadrique gathered troops in Medina de Rioseco to rebel against the king. John II of Castile also brought together his supporters, including Alvaro de Luna, his son Henry, Pero de Velasco, the Count of Haro, Diego Gómez de Sandoval and others. In 1440, negotiations were held and a temporary truce was agreed on. During this short period of peace, Henry married Blanche II of Navarre, and Fadrique was godfather of the couple.

== 1445-1473 ==
In 1445, Fadrique again participated in an alliance against Alvaro de Luna. The admiral was captured but managed to escape to Medina de Rioseco.

In 1448, Fadrique was accused of a conspiracy against the king and a plot to murder Álvaro de Luna. Fadrique fled again, went to Aragon to seek support and thence to Italy, where Alfonso V, king of Aragon was at the time.

In 1449, an alliance against Álvaro de Luna was again forged. This time, Fadrique joined forces with John II, king of Navarre. In 1447, John II of Castile had married his daughter Juana Enríquez. The new queen soon made short shrift of the influential nobles at court. Álvaro was arrested on April 4, 1453, and sentenced to death. He was beheaded on June 2, 1453.

John II of Castile died on July 20, 1454 and was succeeded by Henry IV the next day. A new series of intrigues at the court of Castile began, and Fadrique again played a role.

Fadrique Enríquez de Mendoza died in 1473 and was buried in the monastery of Our Lady of Hope of Valdescopezo in Medina de Rioseco.

== Issue ==
With Marina Fernández de Córdoba:

- Juana Enríquez, later Queen of Aragon and mother of Ferdinand II of Aragon

With Teresa Fernández de Quiñones:

- Alonso Enríquez (1435 – 1485), 3rd Admiral of Castile from House of Enríquez
- Pedro, fourth Adelantado Mayor of Andalusia (? – 1492)
- Enrique Enríquez (? – 1504), major-domo mayor del rey, lord of Orso. Father of Maria Enriquez de Luna and great grandfather of Saint Francis Borgia, 4th Duke of Gandía
- Francisco Enríquez
- María, married García Álvarez de Toledo, 1st Duke of Alba and great grandmother of Eleanor of Toledo, consort of Cosimo I de' Medici, Grand Duke of Tuscany
- Leonor
- Inés
- Aldonza, married Juan Ramón Folch IV de Cardona
- Blanca
