= Aerodrome of Casarrubios del Monte =

Airport in Spain

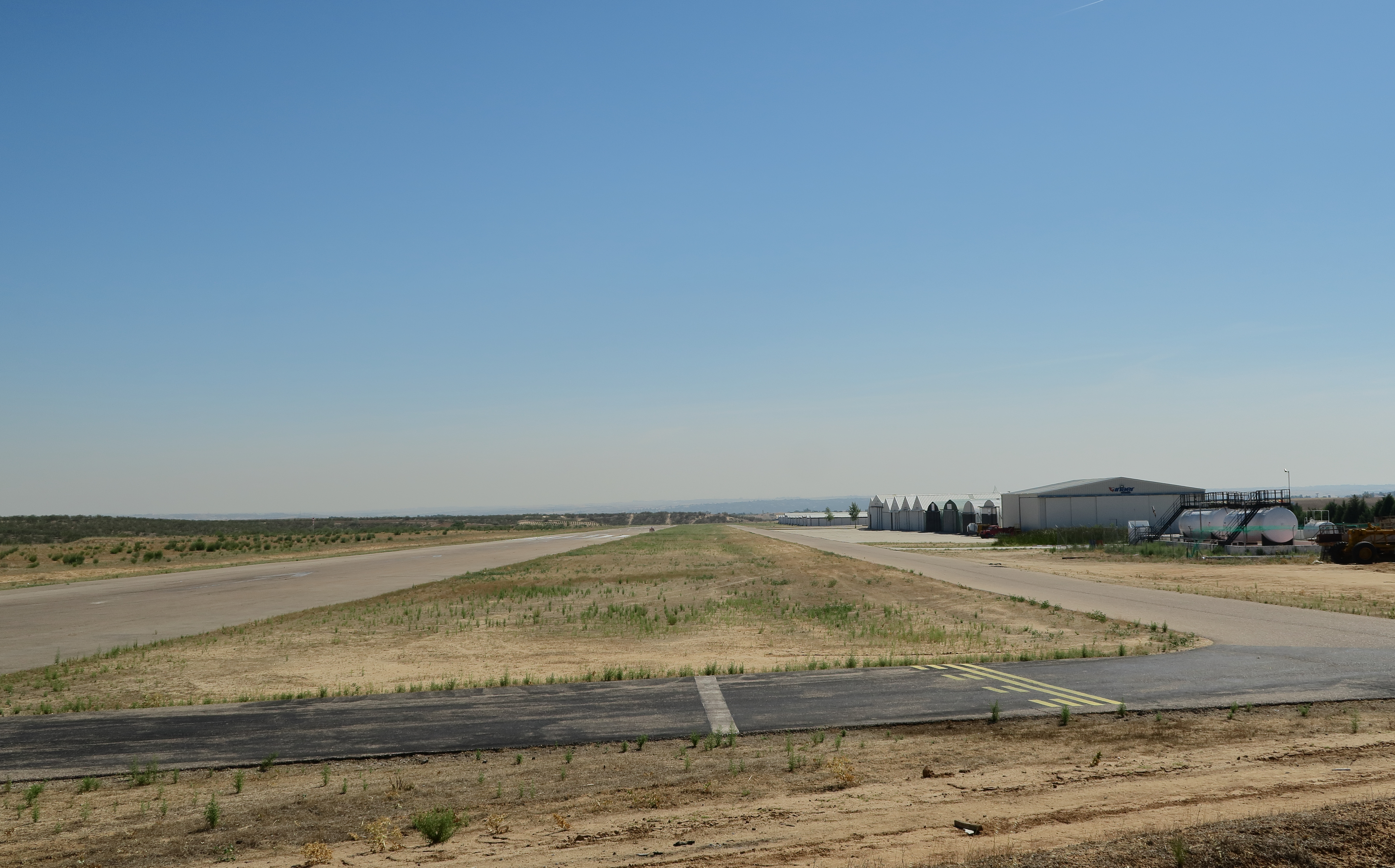
- IATA: none; ICAO: LEMT

Summary
- Airport type: Private
- Owner: Aerohobby
- Serves: Casarrubios del Monte (Toledo)
- Elevation AMSL: 2.050 ft / 625 m
- Coordinates: 40°14′04″N 004°01′36″W
- Website: casarrubios.net
- Interactive map of Aerodrome of Casarrubios del Monte

Runways
Direction	Length		Surface
Direction	ft	m	Surface
08/26		950 x 26	Asphalt

The Aerodrome of Casarrubios del Monte, (IATA: LEMT) is a Spanish private aerodrome located in the town of Casarrubios del Monte (Toledo). The aerodrome is managed by the company Aerohobby.

The aerodrome has an asphalt runway of 950 by 26 metres (3,117 ft × 85 ft). and a parallel Taxiway for the taxiing of aircraft.

It is a non-controlled aerodrome where the traffic (with radio) has to be separated using the Radio frequency of 123.500.

It is used for general aviation and is widely used also for the training schools from the Madrid Cuatro Vientos Airport, mainly for touch-and-go landing training.

== Services of the aerodrome ==
The aerodrome has different services.

=== Refueling ===
Different types of fuel are served

- JET-A1
- Unleaded fuel 95
- AVGAS 100LL

=== Hangars and taxiing ===
There are different types of hangars and taxy areas available at the buildings close to the runway.

== Holding pattern ==
The holding pattern of the aerodrome is performed at 2,800 feet (850 m) (MSL), this is, at 800 feet (240 m) above terrain level for general aviation aircraft and at 2,500 feet (760 m) for Ultralight aviation aircraft.

There are two holding patterns, one at the north of the runway and another one at the south. General aviation aircraft and ultralights with radio operate at the north of the aerodrome and the Autogyro operate at the south.

== See also ==
- Madrid-Cuatro Vientos Airport
- List of airports in Spain
