= Fadrique Alfonso =

Illegitimate son of Alfonso XI of Castile (1334–1358)

Don Fadrique Alfonso
- Lord of Haro
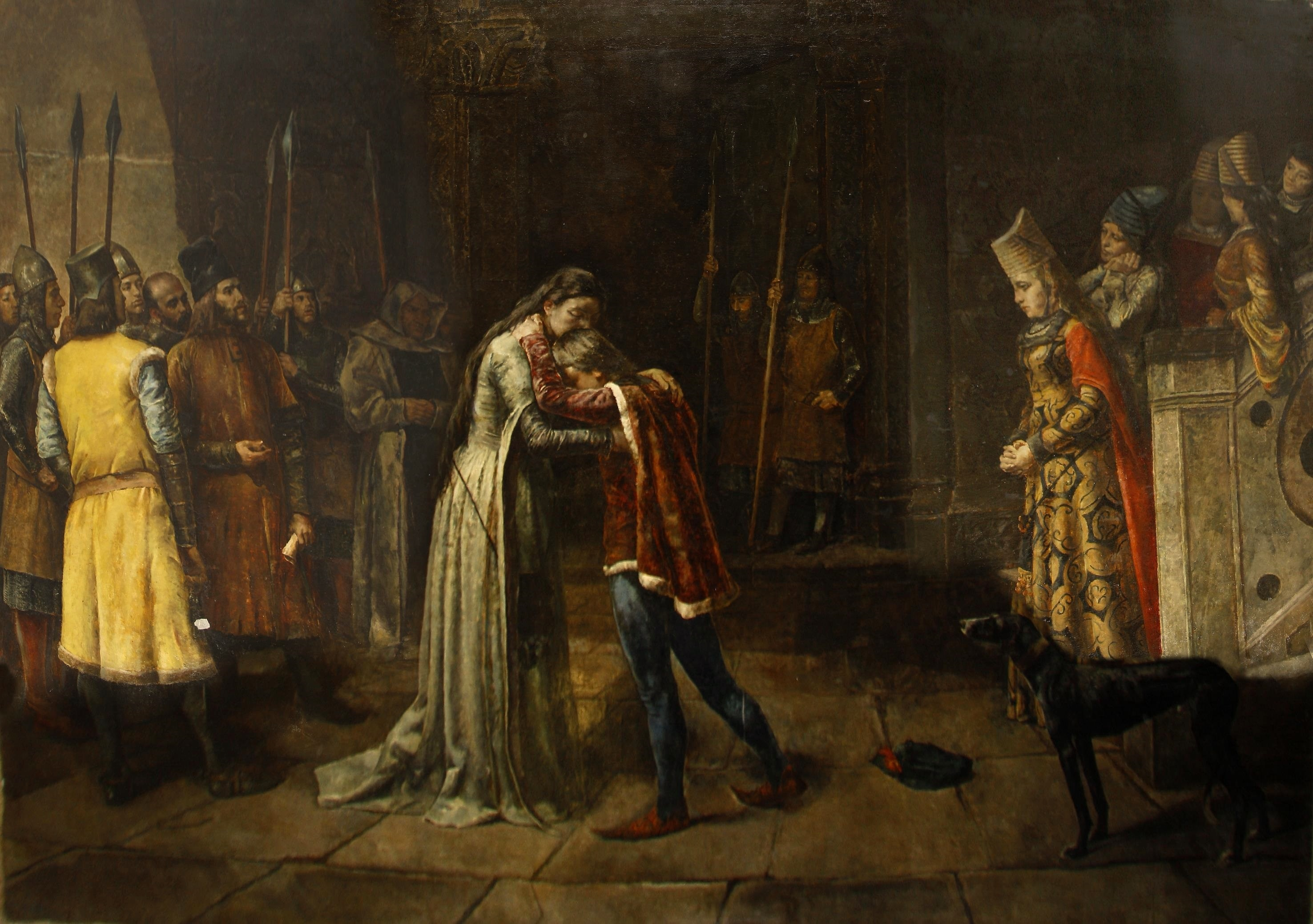
- Fadrique bidding farewell to his mother Leonor de Guzmán before her execution
- Born: 13 January 1334; Seville
- Died: 29 May 1358 (aged 24); Seville
- Noble family: House of Enríquez
- Issue: Illegitimate: Alonso Enríquez; Pedro Enríquez; Leonor Enríquez
- Father: Alfonso XI of Castile
- Mother: Eleanor of Guzman

Fadrique Alfonso of Castile, 1st Señor de Haro (1334–1358), 25th Master of the Order of Santiago (1342–1358), was the fifth illegitimate child of Alfonso XI of Castile and Eleanor of Guzman. He was born in Seville.

== Biography ==
Fadrique was a twin to Henry of Trastámara. While his father lived, the children of Eleanor de Guzman, the king's favorite, profited from appointments and royal grants. With this backing, in 1342, Fadrique rose to the leading role of Maestre of the militant monastic Order of Santiago. The prior Maestre had been Alonso Meléndez de Guzmán, his maternal uncle. In 1354, Fadrique was granted the role as custodian (Adelantado Mayor de la Frontera) of the Portuguese frontier. The rebelling Count Henry of Trastamara took refuge in the French court of Jean II after he was cornered in Asturias in 1354, and the count sought support from the French monarchy. Fadrique did not join his brother's rebellion until much later, during the War of Two Peters (Aragon vs. Castile).

When Alfonso XI died from the Black Death during a siege of Gibraltar, the sons of Dona Eleanor Guzman rebelled after the king's death, refusing to acknowledge the new fifteen year-old heir, Peter I of Castile. During the reign of King Alfonso XI, Dona Eleanor de Guzman (the king's favorite concubine) had taken Queen Maria of Portugal's place at many important events, thus causing bad feelings between the two. Queen Maria of Portugal was regent for one year after her husband's death. When Dona Eleanor's sons' rebelled Count Joao de Albuquerque easily convinced the Queen Mother that Eleanor de Guzman had played a part in the rebellion, and not needing much prodding, Dona Eleanor was executed. The subsequent execution of Eleanor in Talavera in 1351, added more fuel to the fire of the rebellion by Guzman's sons, in particular her fourth born, Count Henry of Trastamara, who through marriage, ruled the northeastern portion of the kingdom. The future Henry II of Castile and León, had several brothers: Fadrique, Tello of Castile, and Sancho of Castile. Through a combination of threats and diplomacy, Peter I of Castile was able to elicit fealty and a temporary reconciliation with his half-brothers. But this was not to last. Master Fadrique of The Order of Santiago, a religious knight, was named royal emissary to Bourbon, France, when he went to escort Peter's bride-to-be, Blanche of Bourbon. There were rumors he had slept with his brother's bride. “Just what had happened, it is somewhat difficult to discover, and the story is told that the king, listening to scandalous talk, was made to believe that his royal messenger and half-brother, Fadrique, had played the role of Sir Tristan as he had brought the lady back and that she had been a somewhat willing Isolde.” Women of Romance Countries, John Effinger (2021). The subsequent turmoil of this marriage and Peter's entanglement with his concubine, María de Padilla, who King Peter later swore he had married in a secret ceremony, was unlikely to have help cement a relationship between King Peter and Master Fadrique.

Fadrique died when he joined the rebellion on the frontier during the War with Aragon, when he was fighting with his brother Tello. A propaganda legend was created that one finds in many manuscripts which claims that he and his knights met with the king in Seville, while paying visits to the King's mistress, Maria de Padilla. He was then apprehended and killed by being tossed out the window while the king ate his lunch. This legend is in reality the real-life death of the exiled Prince Jean of Aragon, the king's cousin, who was plotting to take the throne as the king had no acknowledged legitimate heirs, as yet. Jean foolishly thought King Peter I would make him the Lord of Vizcaya and dimwittedly met with the autocratic king, who had no intention of handing over a valuable part of his kingdom to him. Prince Jean of Aragon, after angering the king, was promptly killed by being thrown out the window, which Ayala then used later in his propaganda by stating the king yelled as the prince's body fell, "Here is your Lord of Vizcaya!" Propagandists then made this Master Fadrique's death and kept out a lot of the historical details, such as the War of Two Peters, between Aragon and France vs. Castile and Navarre, which was taking place at the time, known as the One Hundred Years' War.

After M. Fadrique de Guzman died in battle, his body was most likely interred in a church nearby in Aragon. In 1579, his mortal remains were transferred to the crypt of the royal chapel, probably by order of the Trastamara ruler, to the Cathedral in Seville where they remain to this day.

== Descendants ==
As Maester of the Order of Santiago, Fadrique was putatively required to remain celibate. Through illegitimate marriages he fathered the lineage of the Enríquez family, who became Admirals of Castile and later Dukes of Medina de Rioseco.

By an unknown woman (possibly a Sephardic Jewish woman named Paloma Ben Yahia), he had one illegitimate son:

- Alfonso Enríquez de Castilla (b. 1354, d. 1429), 1st Señor de Medina de Río Seco, married to Juana de Mendoza (b. circa 1360, d. January 24, 1431), had issue

By Leonor de Angulo y Córdoba (b. c. 1340), a Castilian noblewoman, he had two illegitimate children:

- Pedro Enríquez de Castilla (b. 1355, d. May 5, 1400), 1st Conde de Trastámara, 2nd Constable of Castile, married in 1385 to Isabel de Castro (b. circa 1360), had issue
- Leonor Enríquez de Castilla (b. circa 1357), married to Diego Gómez Sarmiento, Marshall of Castile (b. circa 1355, d. August 14, 1385), had issue.

His descendant Juana Enríquez (1425 – February 13, 1468), was the second wife of John II of Aragon and the mother of Ferdinand II of Aragon.

== Ancestors ==
Ancestors of Fadrique Alfonso

8. Sancho IV of Castile
4. Ferdinand IV of Castile
9. María de Molina
2. Alfonso XI of Castile
10. Denis of Portugal
5. Constance of Portugal
11. Elizabeth of Aragon
Fadrique Alfonso, Lord of Haro
12. Álvaro Perez de Guzman
6. Pedro Núñez de Guzmán
13. Maria Giron
3. Eleanor of Guzman
14. Fernán Pérez Ponce de León
7. Beatriz Ponce de León
15. Urraca Gutiérrez de Meneses

Preceded by Alonso Meléndez de Guzmán	Grand Master of the Order of Santiago; 1342–1358	Succeeded by Garci Álvarez de Toledo
