= Alonso Meléndez de Guzmán =

Cross of the Order of Santiago.

Alonso Meléndez de Guzmán (b. ? - d. 1342) was a Spanish noble from León of the House of Guzmán. Alonso was the Grand Master of the Order of Santiago from 1338 to 1342.

== Family origins ==
He was the son of Pedro Núñez de Guzmán y González and his wife Juana Ponce de León y Meneses. His paternal grandparents were Alvar Pérez de Guzmán and his wife María González Girón. His maternal grandparents were Urraca Gutiérrez de Meneses and Fernán Pérez Ponce de León I of Asturias, and also the head adelantado of the Andalucía border region.

Alonso's sister was Leonor de Guzmán, the lover of Alfonso XI of Castile. His other sister, Juana de Guzmán married Enrique Enríquez "el Mozo" of Villalba de los Barros and head adelantado of Andalucia who was famous for commanding the Castilian army at the Battle of Linuesa.

== Biography ==
He was named by the personal intervention of King Alfonso XI of Castile as head of the Order of Santiago. This appointment provoked disputes as previously, all order Grand Masters had been elected. Alonso de Guzman fought with king Peter I of Aragon, also known as "Peter the Cruel", in the reconquista of the Kingdom of Algeciras but was later assassinated by the king who named the infant Fadrique Alfonso de Castilla Grand Master. Faderique was only eight years old at the time of his appointment.

== Bibliography ==
- Mariana, Juan de (1848). Historia general de España. Gaspar Roig editores. Digitalización

Preceded by Vasco López	Grand Master of the Order of Santiago; 1338–1342	Succeeded by Fadrique Alfonso de Castilla
