= Convento de Santa Isabel de los Reyes =

Convent in Castile-La Mancha, Spain

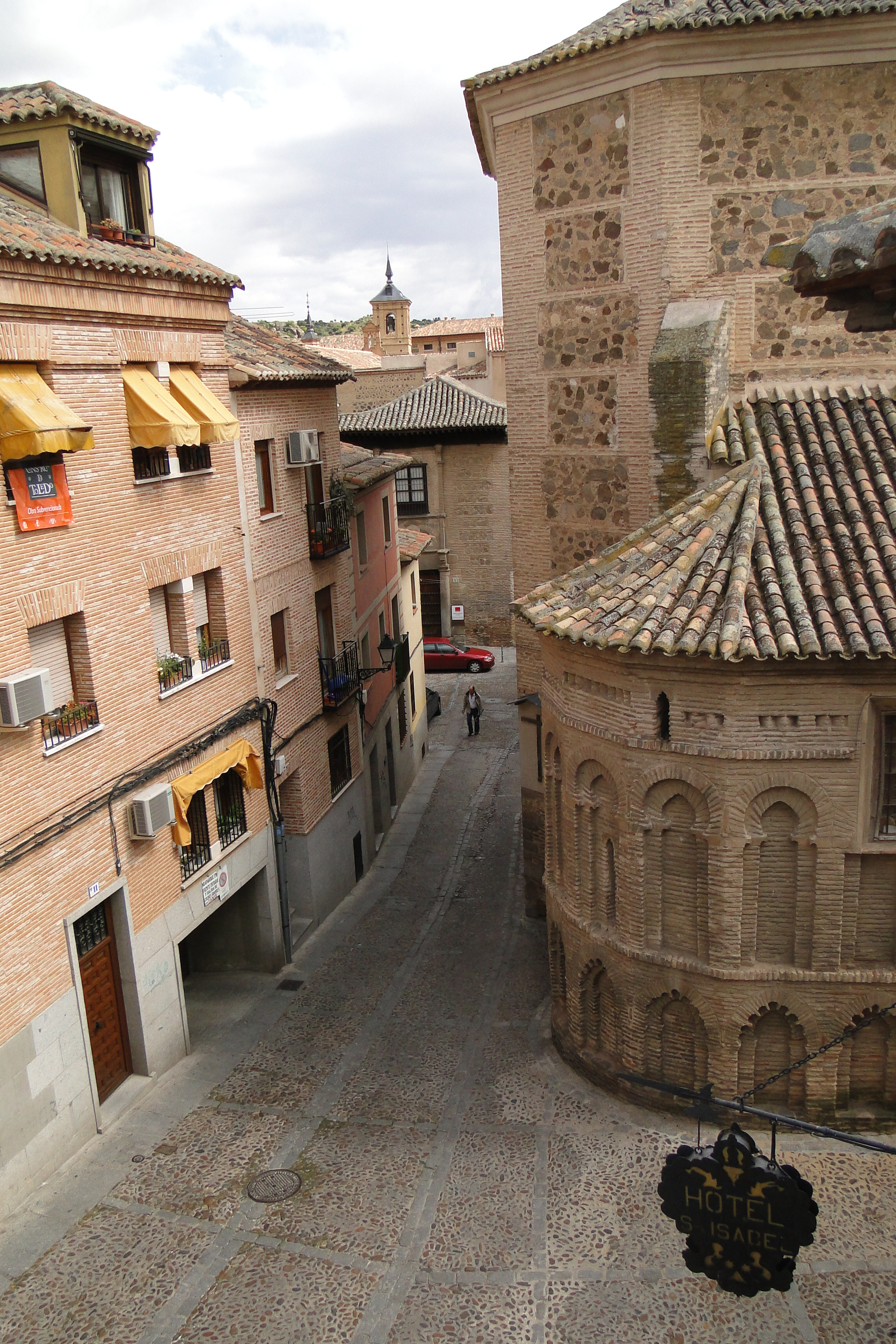
Side view of the convent (right)

The Convento de Santa Isabel de los Reyes is a convent located in the city of Toledo, in Castile-La Mancha, Spain. The current convent, founded in 1477 by Doña María Suárez de Toledo, known as "Sor María la Pobre", has its origins in two different palaces, both Mudéjar from the 14th century and the church of San Antolín.

It is accessed by the convent church, rebuilt during the reign of Charles V, Holy Roman Emperor, through a portal from the time of the Catholic Monarchs (1500). It is in Gothic style and is covered with wood-coffered ceiling.

The main altarpiece is dated in 1572, is Plateresque style and has high reliefs. The choir of the nuns with a azulejos plinth, a Plateresque reredos and an ashlar, all of the 16th century, were all built at the base.

Part of the building is a museum.
