= Marina Fernández de Córdoba =

15th-century Spanish noblewoman

Marina Fernández de Córdoba y Ayala
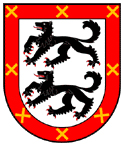
- Coat of Arms of the Ayala family
- Full name: Maria Fernandez de Cordoba and Ayala, fourth Lady of Casarrubios del Monte.
- Born: c. 1394
- Died: 1431
- Noble family: Ayala
- Spouse: Fadrique Enríquez de Mendoza
- Issue: Juana Enríquez Queen consort of Aragon
- Father: Diego Fernández de Córdoba y Carrillo, first Lord of Baena
- Mother: Inés de Ayala y Toledo

Marina Fernández de Córdoba y Ayala (c. 1394 – 1431), also known as Marina de Ayala Córdoba y Toledo, was the fourth Lady of Casarrubios del Monte in the province of Toledo. She was the daughter of Diego Fernández de Córdoba y Carrillo, first Lord of Baena, and Inés Ayala y Toledo, third Lady of Casarrubios del Monte.

== Life ==
Marina married Fadrique Enríquez de Mendoza, Admiral of Castile and Lord of Medina de Rioseco around July 1425. They had one daughter, Juana Enríquez (1425–1468), who married John II of Aragon.

== Sources ==
- Cañas Galvez, Francisco. "Colección diplomática de Santo Domingo el Real de Toledo". Madrid: Silex Ediciones (2010)
