= Juana Enríquez =

Queen of Aragon from 1458 to 1468

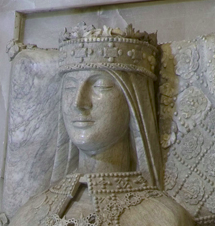

Queen consort of Aragon
- Tenure: 27 June 1458 – 13 February 1468

Queen consort of Navarre
- Tenure: 1 April 1444 – 13 February 1468
- Born: 1425; Torrelobatón
- Died: 13 February 1468 (aged 42–43); Tarragona
- Burial: Poblet Monastery
- Spouse: John II of Aragon (m. 1444)
- Issue: Ferdinand II, King of Aragon; Joanna, Queen of Naples
- House: Enríquez
- Father: Fadrique Enríquez
- Mother: Mariana Fernández de Córdoba

Juana Enriquez, 5th Lady of Casarrubios del Monte (1425 – 13 February 1468) was Queen of Aragon and de facto Queen consort of Navarre as the wife of King John II. Juana Enríquez was the Regent of Navarre during the absence of her husband in the Navarrese Civil War (1451–1455); she also served as Governor of Catalonia in 1462 in the place of her son (who was his father's nominal governor) and, finally, as Regent of Aragon during the absence of her husband in the Catalan Civil War between 1465 and 1468.

== Biography ==
Coat of Arms

Juana Enriquez was a daughter of Fadrique Enríquez and Mariana Fernández de Córdoba, 4th Lady of Casarrubios del Monte, and succeeded her mother in 1431. Born in Torrelobatón, she was a great-great-granddaughter of Alfonso XI of Castile.

=== Queen of Navarre ===
The marriage between Juana Enriquez and John of Aragon was arranged because John wished to ally himself with the powerful noble faction she belonged to, a faction which had major power in Castile at the time. They were engaged in 1443, but the marriage was delayed. The wedding finally took place in 1447.

Juana married John after the death of his first wife, Queen Blanche I of Navarre. Although John ceased to be de jure uxoris monarch of Navarre on his wife's death, he never ceded power to his son, Charles, Prince of Viana, and daughter, de jure Blanche II of Navarre, a decision which Juana supported. Such breaking of the law of succession led to a confrontation with the Crown of Aragon and a conflict between farmers and nobles, the outbreak of Navarrese Civil War. When John served in the war, he appointed Juana Enríquez to act as his Regent. She left Navarre to give birth in 1452. Her husband was forced to leave Navarre in 1455, and her stepson Charles of Viana was installed as regent in Navarre with Castilian support.

=== Queen of Aragon ===
In 1458, her husband became king of Aragon. In 1460, her father in Castile provided her with documentation that Charles of Viana was planning to murder his father. Juana showed the document to her husband, who used it in order to have his son arrested and imprisoned, accusing him of treason. The Catalonians protested against the arrest of Charles of Viana. The king appointed his wife to negotiate with the Catalonians. In June 1461 she made a treaty with Catalonia in which Charles of Viana was appointed his father's governor in Catalonia. Shortly thereafter however, Charles of Viana died. John II proclaimed his son with Juana, Ferdinand, as heir of Aragon. He gave Juana the task to have their son accepted as heir and governor of Catalonia.

On 6 February 1462, Juana Enríquez had her son hailed as the heir of Catalonia and his father's governor of Catalonia. Since her son was a minor, she swore his oath to the Catalonians in his place, and acted as Governor of Catalonia. Accused of having ordered the poisoning of Charles of Viana, Juana fled to Girona, seeking the protection of the bishop. They were besieged in Girona until July 1462. Juana Enríquez was appointed regent of Aragon in March 1465, when her husband was absent in Catalonia, trying to suppress the rebellion.

== Legacy ==
Queen Juana's greatest wish was to have her son, Ferdinand, married to Isabella, half-sister and heir presumptive of King Henry IV of Castile. Their marriage, which did occur, lasted for 35 years and produced a prince and four queens. However, Juana died on 13 February 1468 from breast cancer, a year before the marriage occurred. Her husband never remarried and reigned until his death in 1479. Her daughter Joanna married Ferdinand I of Naples and thus became Queen of Naples.

Juana Enríquez House of Enríquez Cadet branch of the House of Ivrea Born: 1425 Died: 13 February 1468
Spanish royalty
Preceded by Maria of Castile	Queen consort of Aragon, Majorca, Valencia and Sicily; Countess consort of Barcelona; 1458–1468	Vacant Title next held by Isabella I of Castile
Preceded by Agnes of Cleves	Queen consort of Navarre, de facto 1444–1468	Vacant Title next held by Margaret of Angoulême
Spanish nobility
Preceded by Mariana Fernández de Córdoba	Lady of Casarrubios del Monte; 1431–1468	Succeeded by Ferdinand of Aragon
