= Casarrubios del Monte =

- municipality
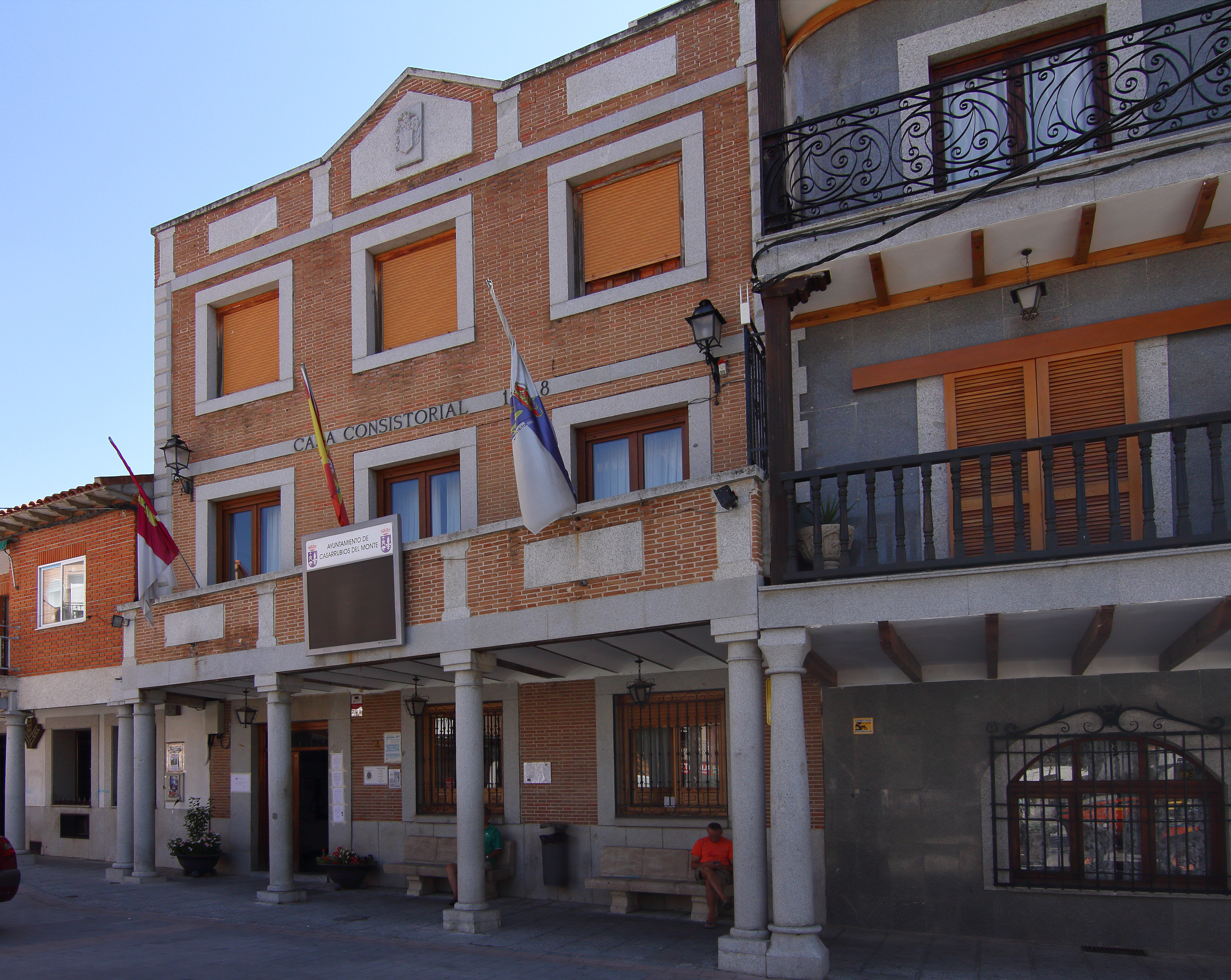
- Town Hall

- Flag Coat of arms

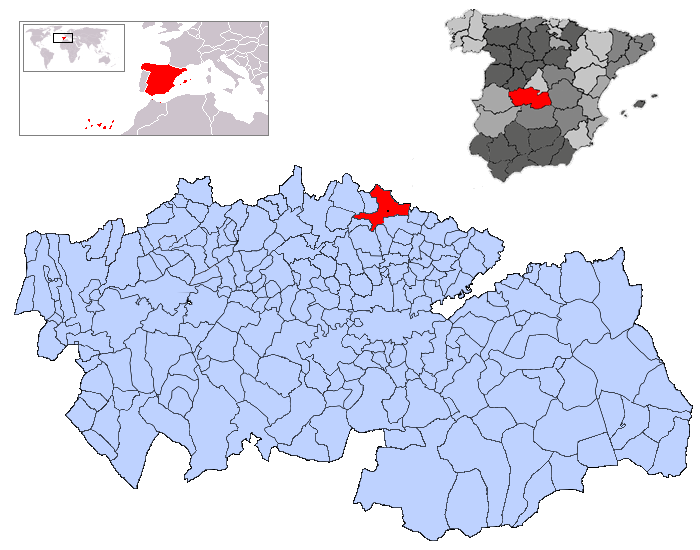
- Coordinates: 40°11′N 4°02′W
- Country: Spain
- Autonomous community: Castile-La Mancha
- Province: Toledo
- Municipality: Casarrubios del Monte

Area
  - Total: 96 km^{2} (37 sq mi)
- Elevation: 616 m (2,021 ft)

Population (2025-01-01)
  - Total: 7,424
  - Density: 77/km^{2} (200/sq mi)
- Time zone: UTC+1 (CET)
  - Summer (DST): UTC+2 (CEST)

Casarrubios del Monte is a municipality located in the province of Toledo, Castile-La Mancha, Spain. According to the 2006 census (INE), the municipality has a population of 4,321 inhabitants.

== Demographics ==
Historical population
Year	Pop.	±%
1900	1,769	—
1910	1,958	+10.7%
1920	2,294	+17.2%
1930	2,142	−6.6%
1940	2,013	−6.0%
1950	2,167	+7.7%
1960	1,958	−9.6%
1970	1,557	−20.5%
1981	1,536	−1.3%
1991	1,947	+26.8%
2001	3,166	+62.6%
2011	5,380	+69.9%
2021	6,177	+14.8%
2023	6,671	+8.0%
Source: ISTAT
