= Medina de Rioseco =

- Flag Coat of arms
- Nickname: City of the Admirals
- Location within Spain
- Coordinates: 41°52′59″N 5°02′34″W
- Country: Spain
- Autonomous community: Castile and León
- Province: Valladolid
- Municipality: Medina de Rioseco

Area
  - Total: 115 km^{2} (44 sq mi)
- Elevation: 741 m (2,431 ft)

Population (2025-01-01)
  - Total: 4,617
  - Density: 40.1/km^{2} (104/sq mi)
- Time zone: UTC+1 (CET)
  - Summer (DST): UTC+2 (CEST)
- Website: www.medinaderioseco.com/

Medina de Rioseco is a municipality located in the province of Valladolid, in the autonomous community of Castile and León and Spain. According to a 2011 census (INE), the municipality has a population of 4,967 inhabitants.

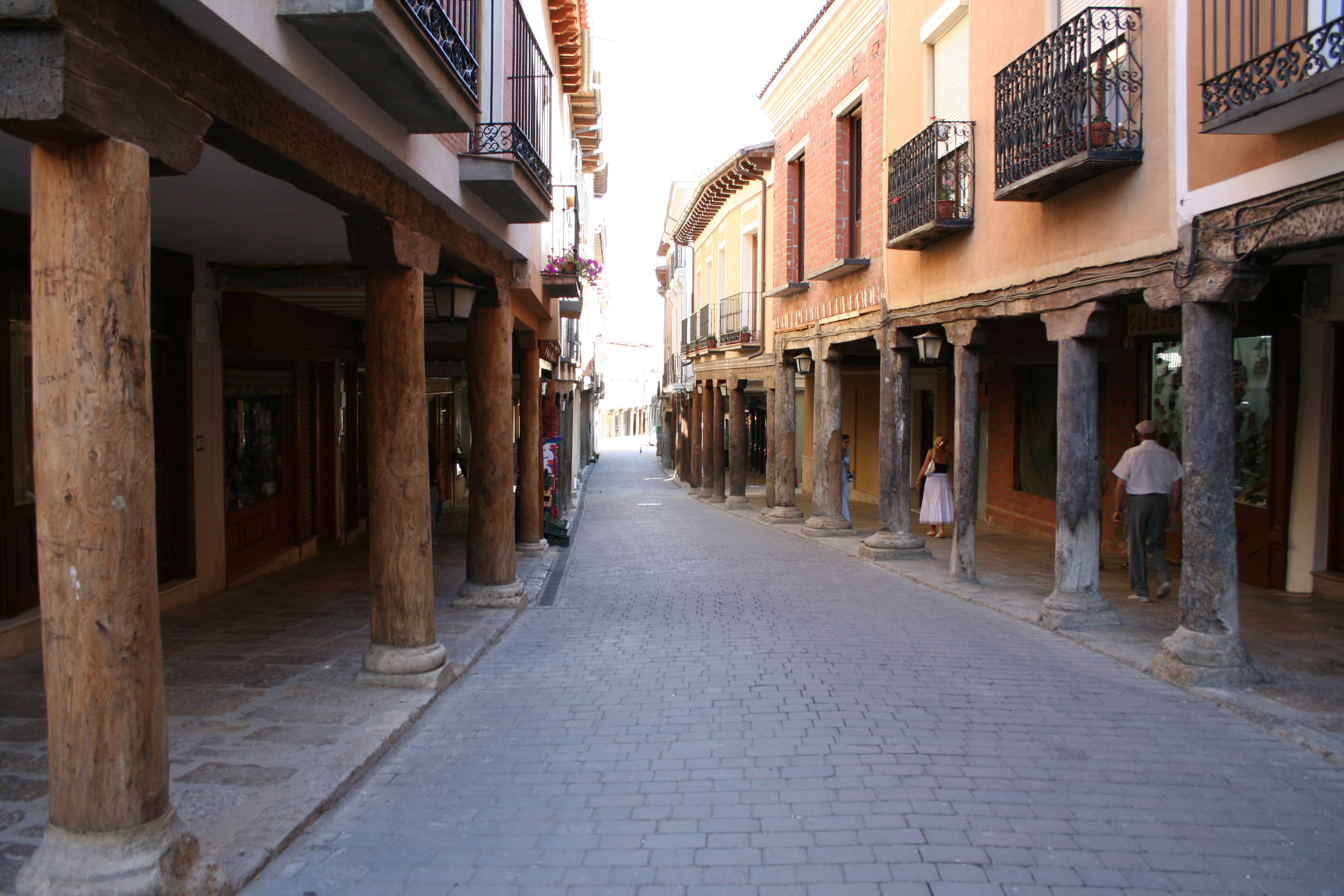
Typical street in Medina de Rioseco.

The city also has the nicknames the "City of the Admirals" and "Old India Girl."

It has an area of 115.43 square kilometres (44.6 sq mi), with a population density of 43.0 inhabitants per square kilometre (111/sq mi). It is a municipality of Tierra de Campos. The Sequillo river passes nearby.

The coat of arms shield is quartered, with two castles in gold and two horses leaning out of colored battlements on a silver background, surrounded by a wreath of laurel leaves, but no crown. It was granted by King John I of Castile.

The city lies along the road of El Camino de Santiago de Madrid.

== Origins ==
The oldest traces of Rioseco come from the Iron Age and the time of Celtic Iberia. Mistakenly, some ancient authors identified this area as a Forum Egurrorum or a market square in the Visigoths' era. Documents relating to the Tierra de Campos and Campos Gothic or Campii Gotorum date from this period. In the middle of the ninth century and throughout the tenth century, this area was a territory of colonization of the Asturian-Leonese kingdom, which also contained Mozarabic people, such as the Iberian Christians who lived under Arab Islamic rule in Al-Andalus. This perhaps led to a place name for the population: "Medina" (Arabic for "city").

== Reconquest ==
Map showing the Iberian Peninsula in AD 1000, with Condado de Castilla still a part of the Kingdom of León.

The confluence of the borders between the Kingdom of León and the County of Castile led to battles in this area between the two kingdoms. In 1037, Castile became the separate Kingdom of Castile. Alfonso X the Wise determined the ultimate limits with Valladolid in 1258, leaving Medina for the mountains of Torozos.

During the Middle Ages, in the Merindad of Valladolid Infantazgo (in old Castilian cited as: Meryndat del Infantadgo de Ualladolid), there was an administrative division of the Kingdom of Castile, which is described in the book Calif of Behetrías of Castile, drafted by the Cortes of Valladolid of 1351, when the establishment of knights applied to King Pedro I to absorb the Behetrías land by conversion to manors.

== Admirals of Castile ==
In May 1405, Don Alonso Enriquez (1354–1429) received the title of Admiral of Castile from King Henry III of Castile, after the death of the previous owner of this title, Diego Hurtado de Mendoza. In 1423 John II of Castile established the manor of Medina Rioseco.

Its traditional commercial role since medieval times gained official status over time. Exercising dominion, D. Fadrique Enriquez, second admiral, was granted by John II the privilege of conducting an annual fair. Under the dominion of Alfonso II Enriquez, third Admiral of Castile, Enrique IV of Castile, granted the town the right to conduct a second annual fair, and in 1465, Henry IV gave it a free weekly tax. Don Frederic II and Enríquez de Cabrera—the fourth Admiral—began building the palace of the admirals and the church of San Francisco. He also founded the convent of Santa Clara, and during his rule built the church of Santa María de Mediavilla.

== 16th century ==
Medina de Rioseco became the global trading hub for silver arriving from the Indies through the port of Seville and enjoyed an economic boom that reached its peak during the 16th century. Donations and legacies poured in from the Americas, increasing the wealth of the city and surrounding parishes. Four large Riosecano churches were built, and the city became home to one of the most important fairs of the kingdom, second only to that at Medina del Campo. At this time the, so-called Penitential Monasteries were founded, which were famous for their processions of penance and passion, and their many chapels and hospitals.

The Battle of Medina del Rioseco took place on July 14, 1808, during the Peninsular War.

== Pictures of Santiago Apóstol Church ==
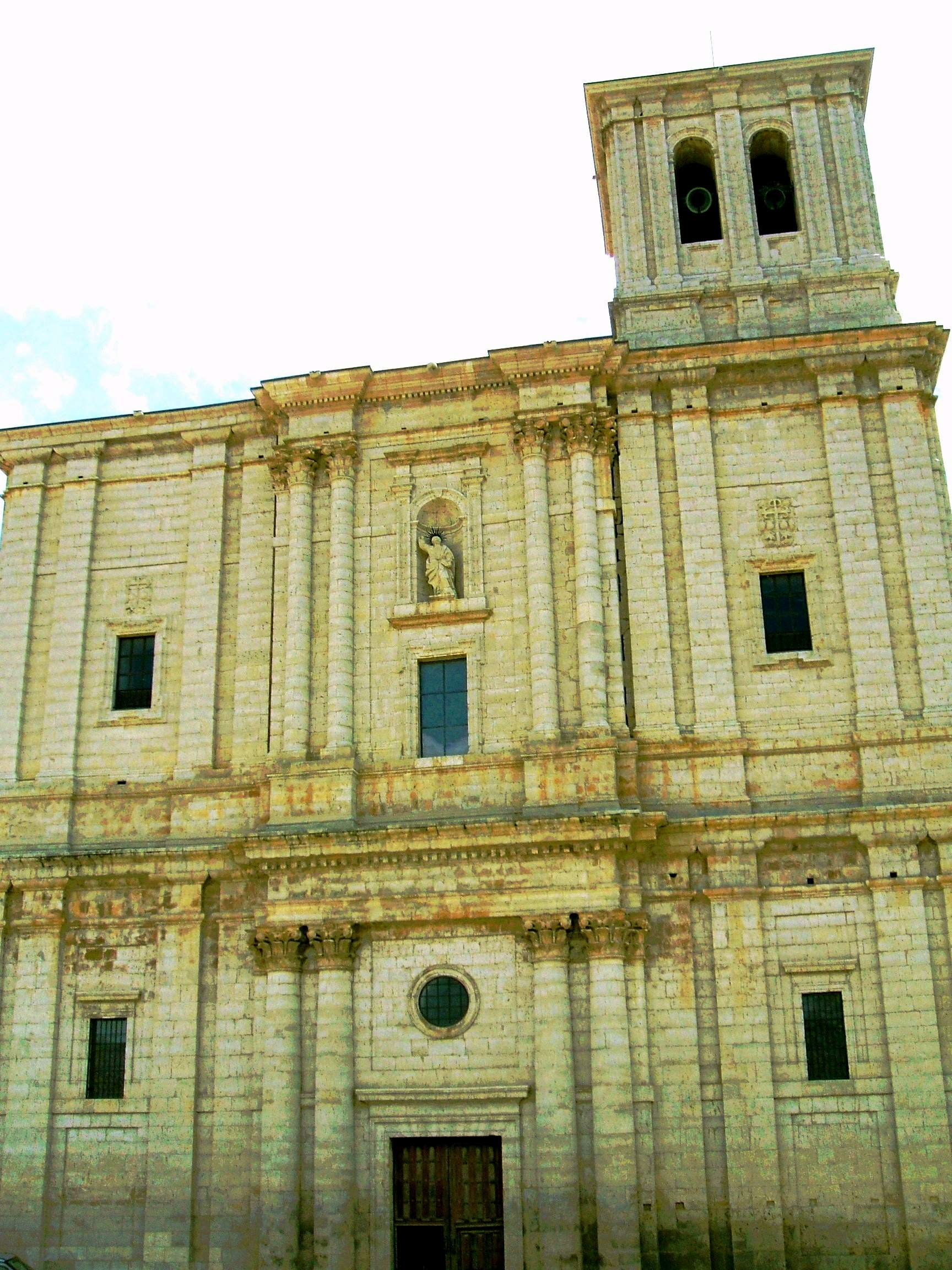
Santiago Apóstol Church

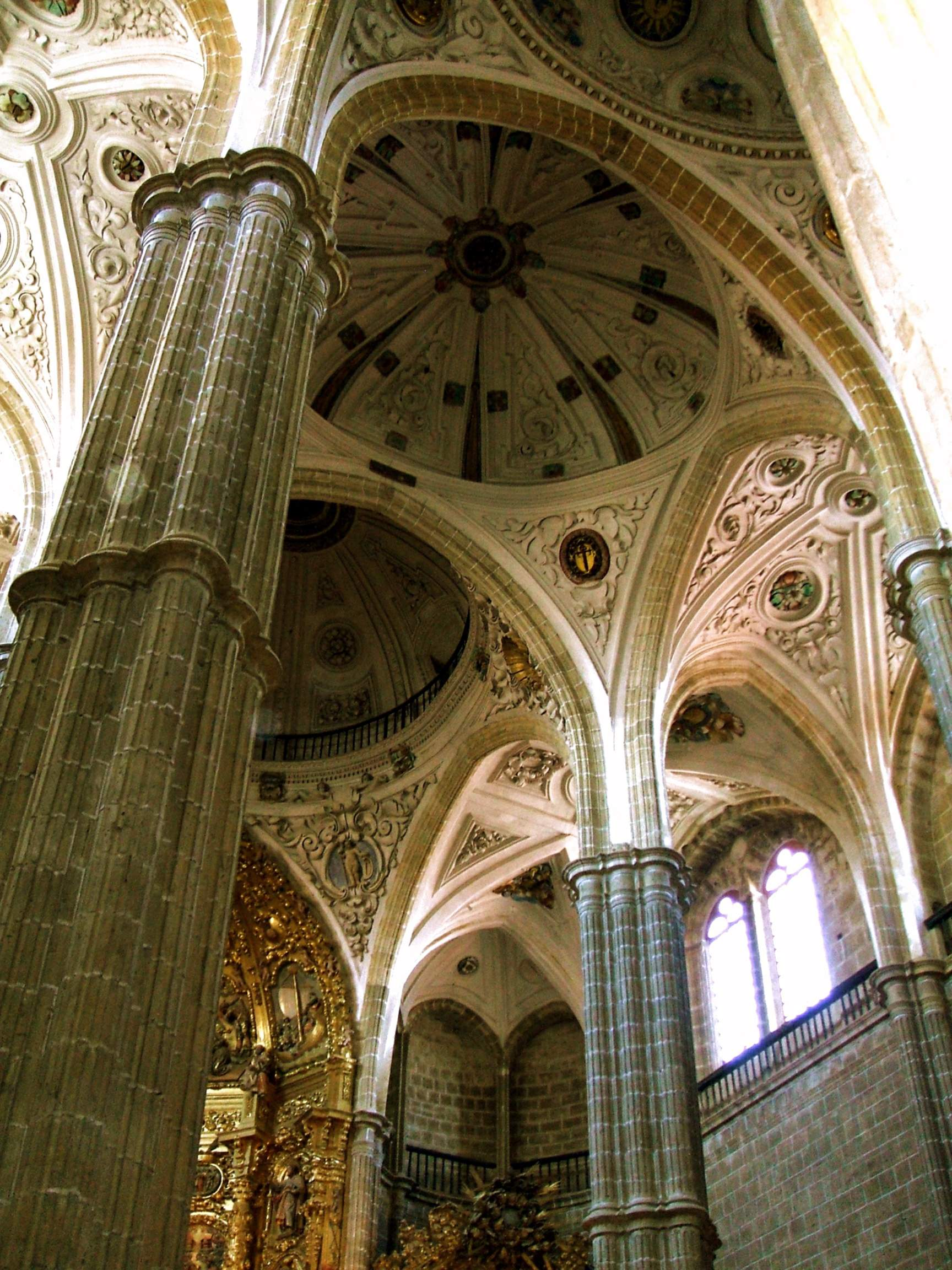

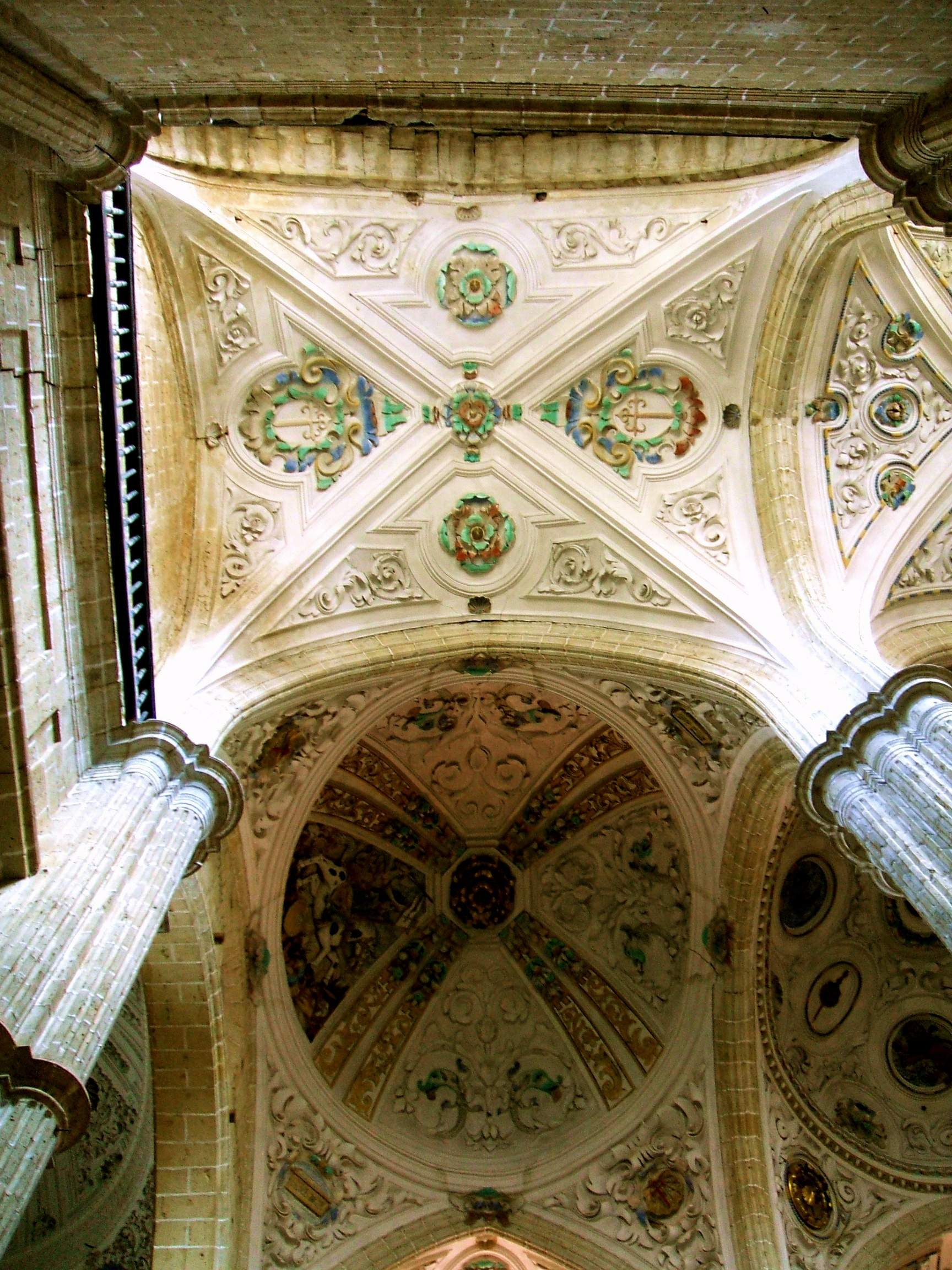

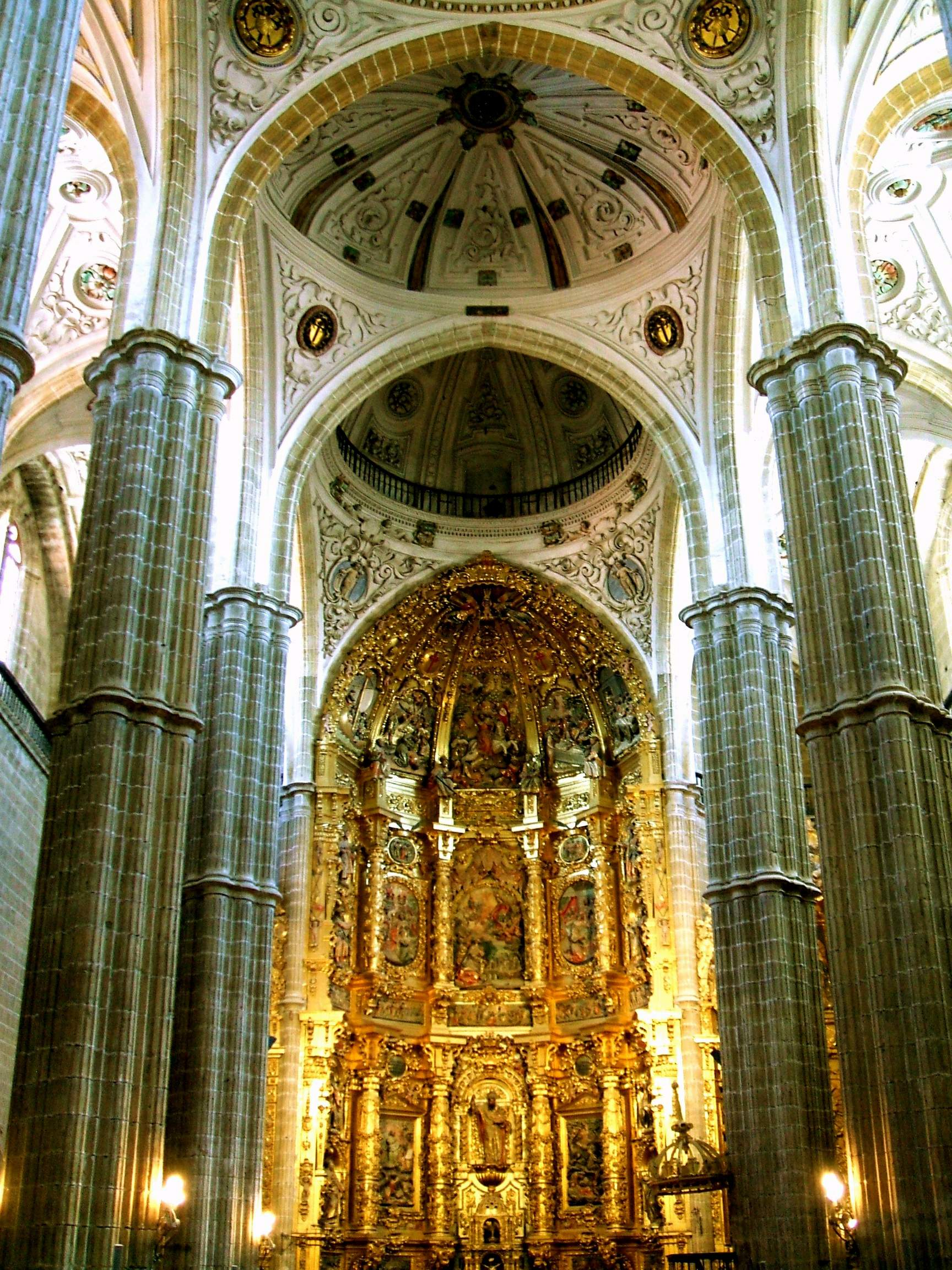

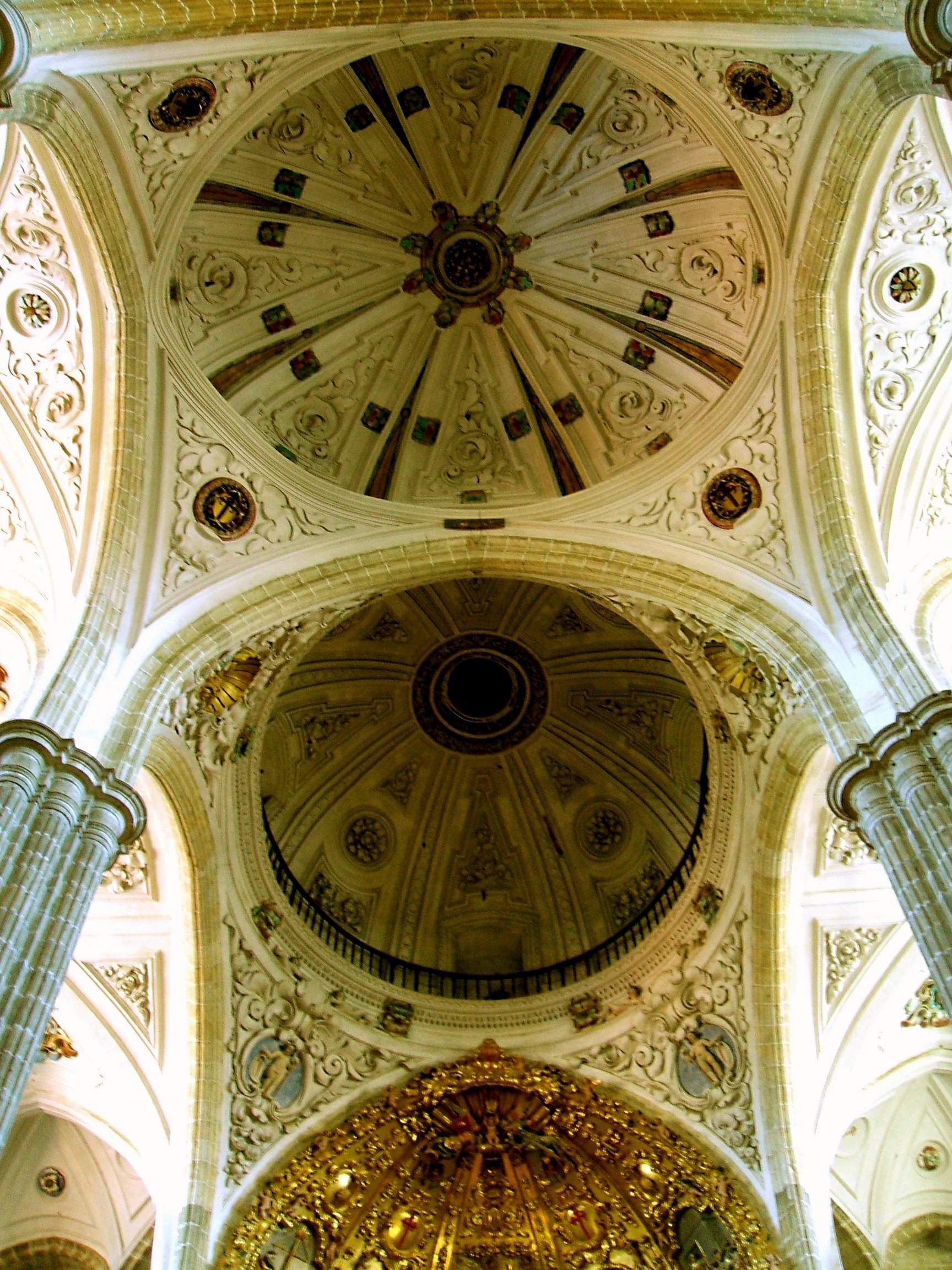

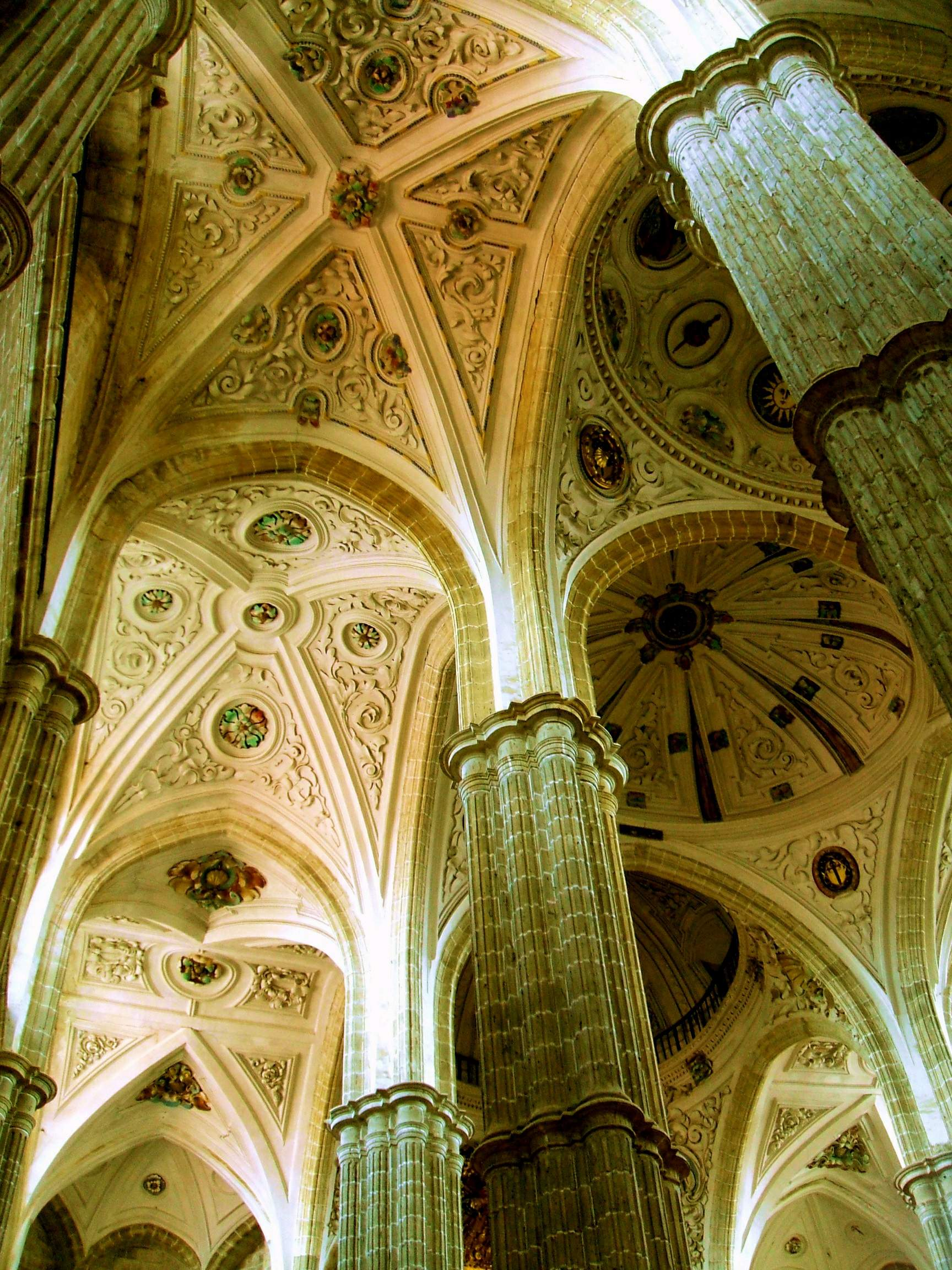

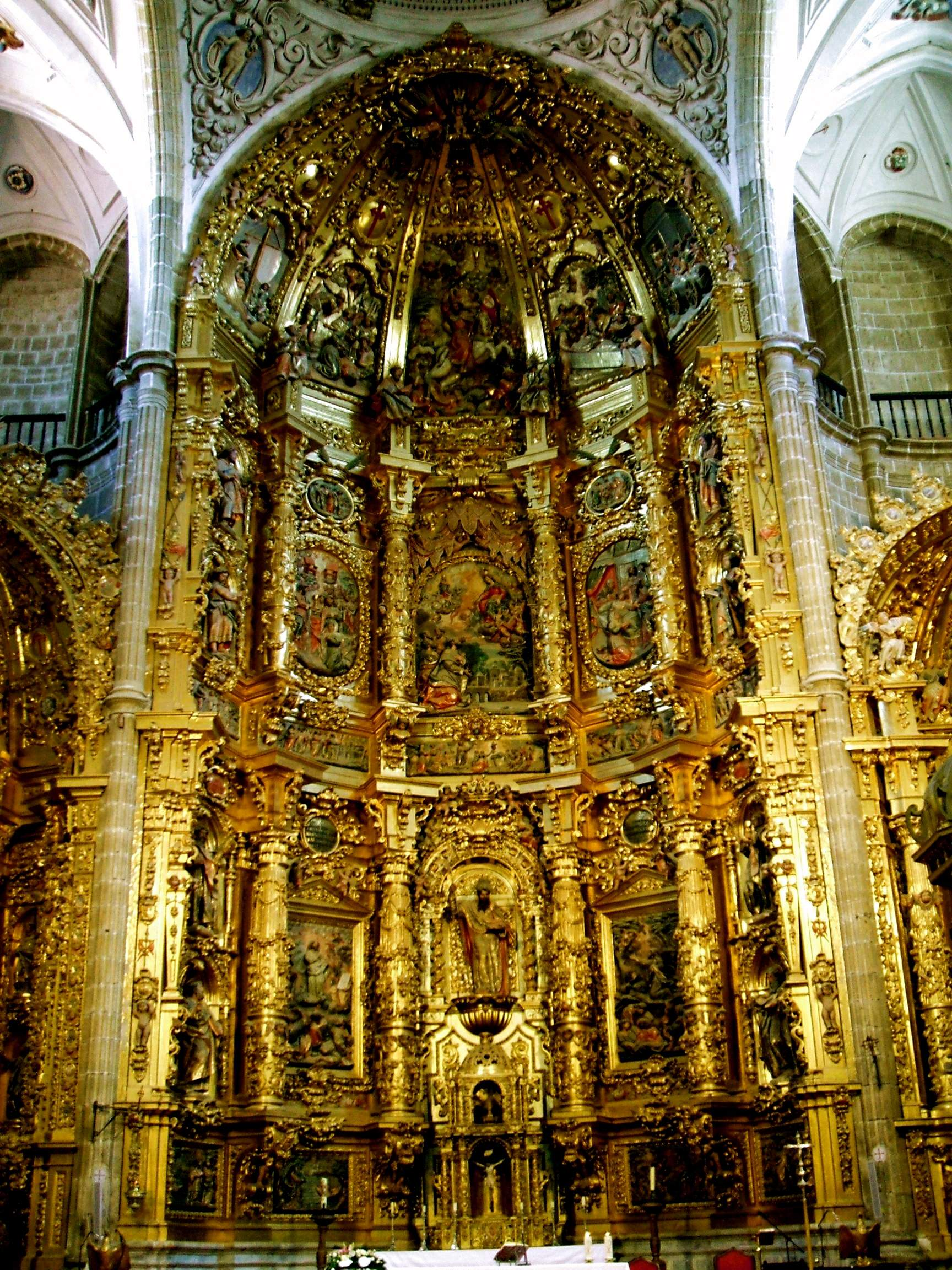
Main baroque altar (18th century)

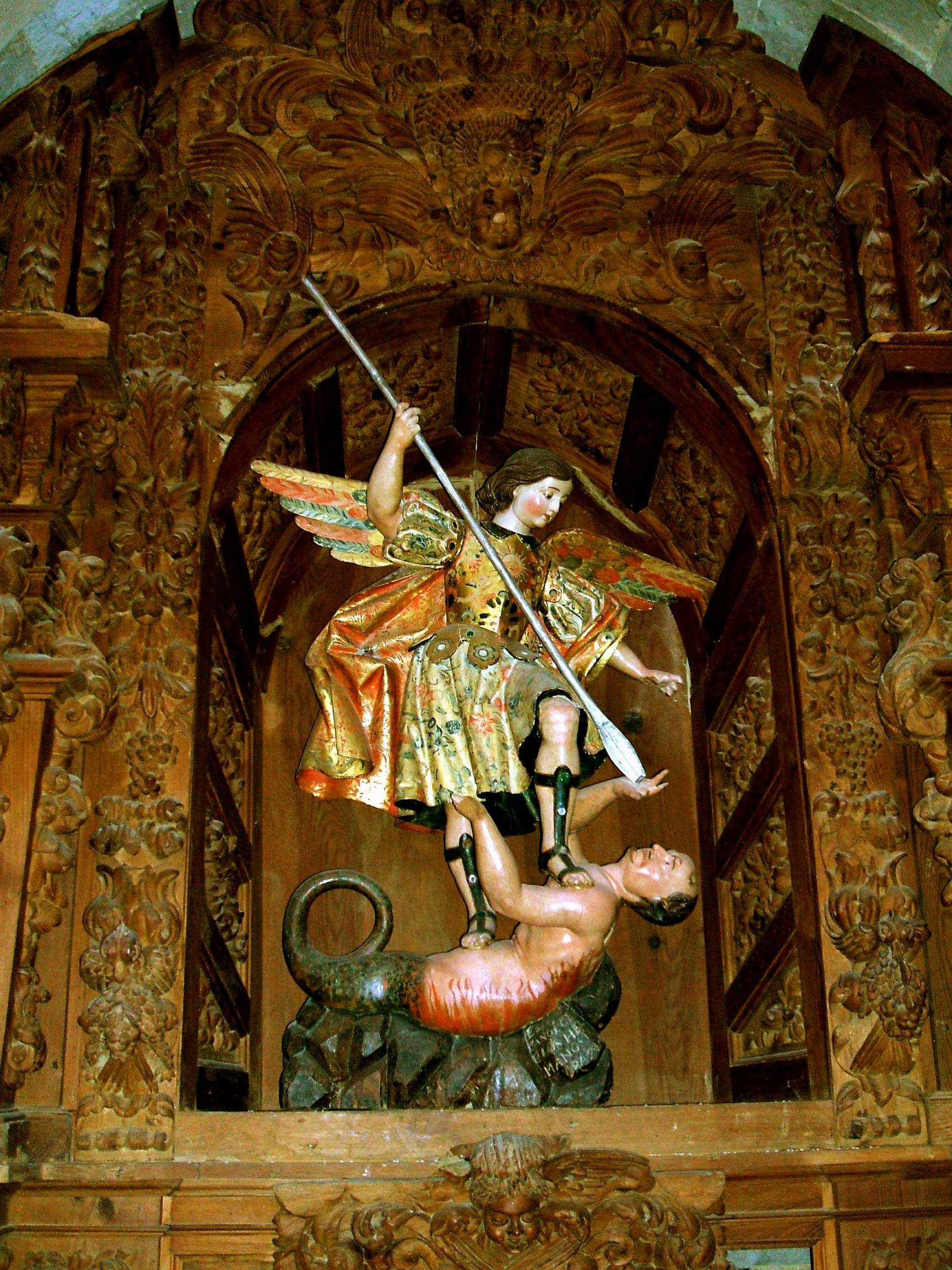

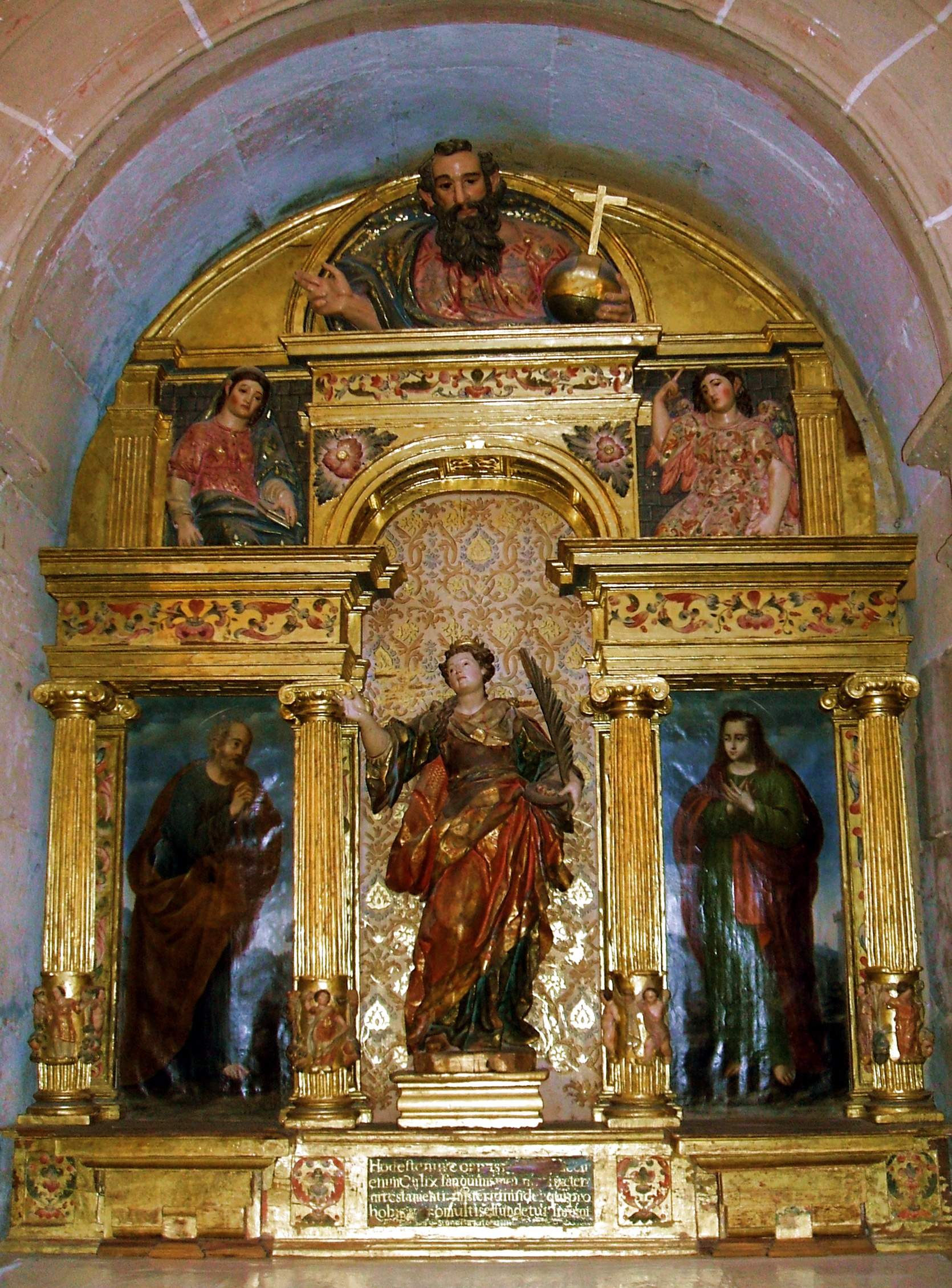

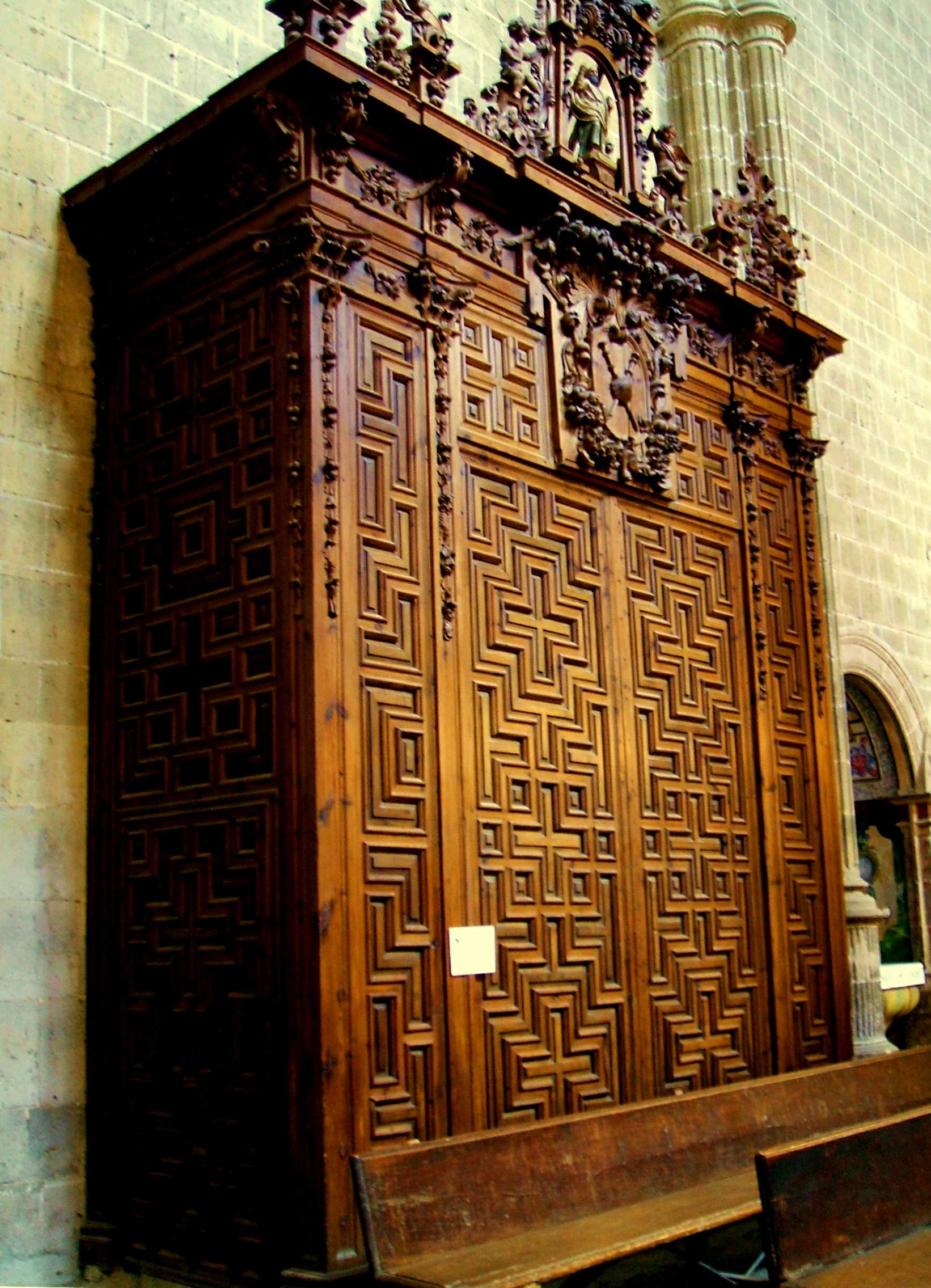

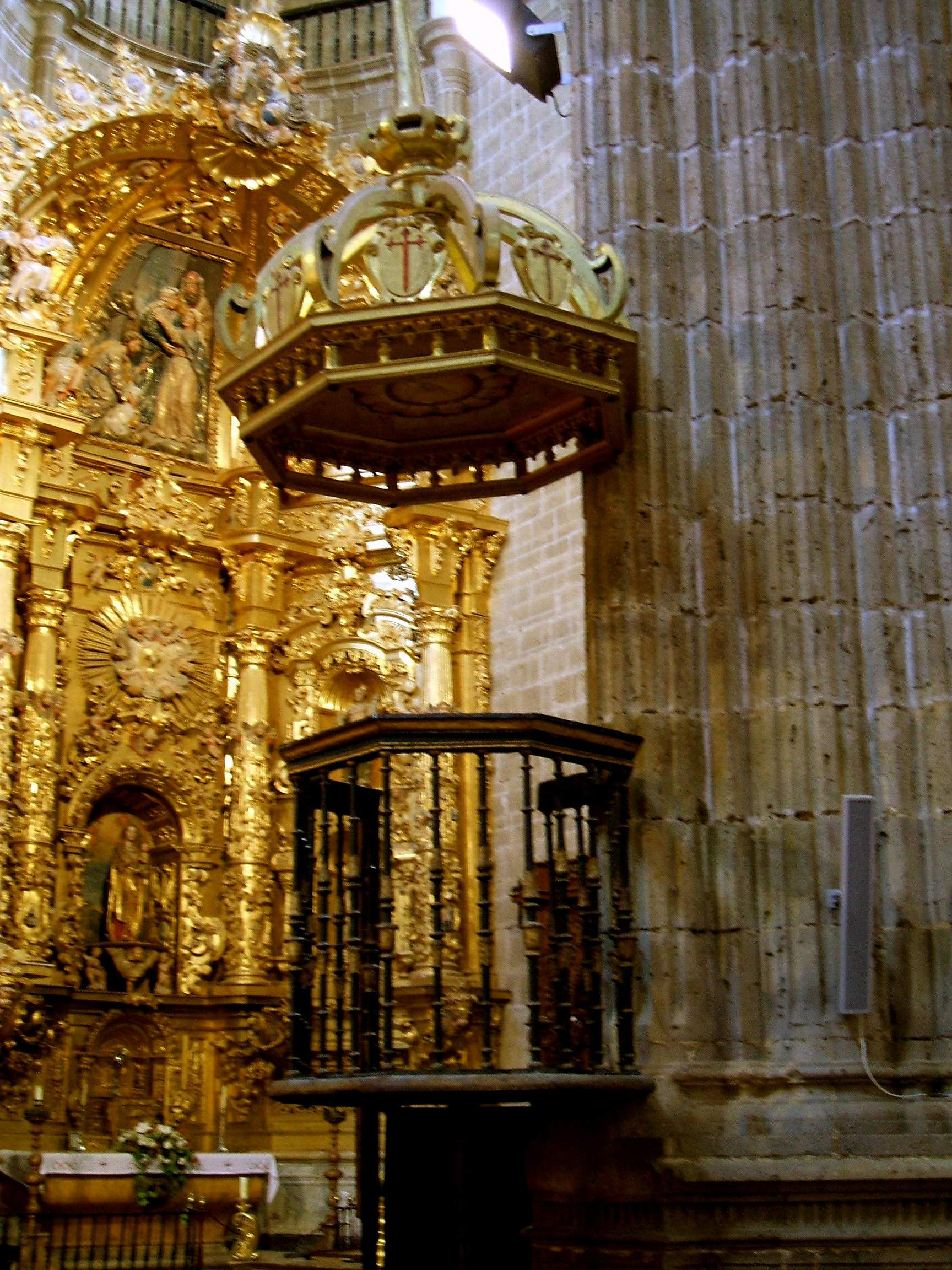

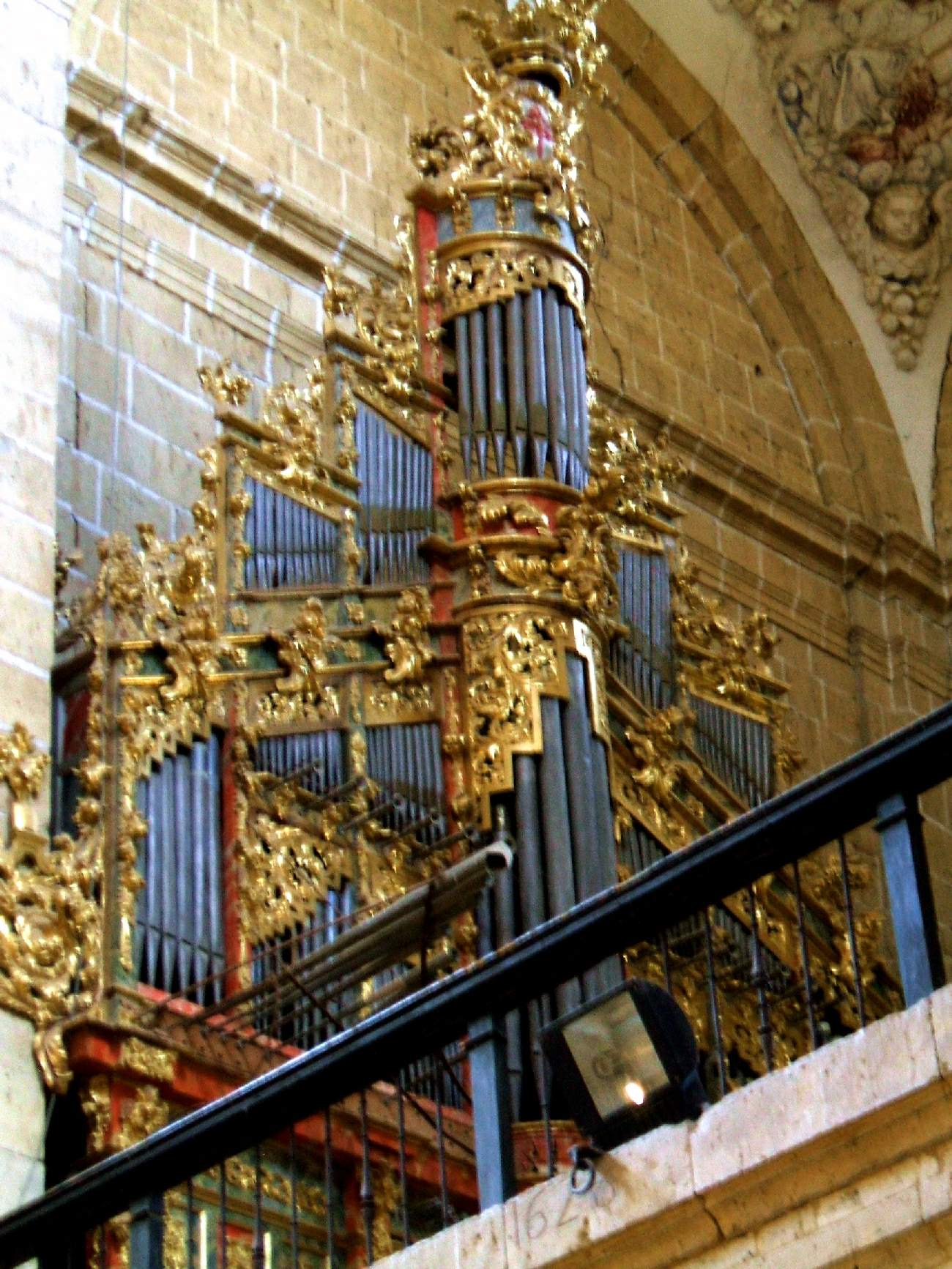
Baroque organ (18th century)

== See also ==
- Tierra de Campos
- Cuisine of the province of Valladolid
